= Pom-pom (disambiguation) =

A pom-pom is a loose, fluffy, decorative ball or tuft of fibrous material, most often seen shaken by cheerleaders or worn atop a hat.

Pom-pom, pompom, pom pom, pom-pon or pompon may also refer to:

== Biology ==
- Hericium erinaceus, known as the pom pom mushroom
- Pompon, the fish Anisotremus surinamensis, inspiration for the name of the submarine
- Eupatorium macrocephalum, aka Pompom Weed
- Pompom (goldfish), a breed of goldfish with swollen nasal outgrowths resembling pom-poms

== Entertainment ==
- Pom Pom (film), a 1984 Hong Kong action comedy film
- Pom Pom and Friends, an animated television series from 2011–12

== Fictional characters ==
- Pom Pom, a fictional character from Super Mario 3D Land
- Pom Pom, a character in the Flash animated cartoon Homestar Runner
- Pom Pom, a character from Bluey
- Pom Pom, a character from the Hungarian cartoon series Pom Pom meséi
- PomPom, a triple-element monster in My Singing Monsters

== Military ==
- QF 1-pounder pom-pom, an infantry gun of the Second Boer War
- QF 2-pounder naval gun, a British anti-aircraft gun in naval use
  - Pom-Pom director, a fire-director for QF 2 pounder naval gun
- USS Pompon (SS-267), a U.S. Navy submarine built during World War II

== Music ==
- "Pom Poms" (song), a song by the Jonas Brothers
- pom pom (album), an album by Ariel Pink
- Pom Pom: The Essential Cibo Matto, an album by Cibo Matto
- Pom Pom Squad, an indie rock band
- The Pom-Poms, a project of Kitty and Sam Ray

== People ==
- François Pompon (1856–1933), French sculptor
- Bob Whiting (1883–1917), English footballer known as Pom Pom Whiting

== Society ==
- Panpan girls (also pom-pom girls), sex workers in postwar Japan

== Other uses ==
- Pom Poms, a candy made by the James O. Welch Co.
- Pom Pom Island, a coral reef island in Malaysia
