= Sargo (disambiguation) =

Sargo may refer to:

== Fishes ==
- Diplodus sargus, the white seabream or sargo, a species of fish from the eastern Atlantic Ocean
- Anisotremus davidsonii, the Xantu sargo, a species of grunt from the Eastern Pacific Ocean
- Archosargus probatocephalus, the sheepshead, a porgy from the western Atlantic which is sometimes called sargo.

== Ships ==
- Sargo-class submarine, a class of US Navy submarines
- USS Sargo (SS-188), a Sargo class submarine commissioned in 1939
- USS Sargo (SSN-583), a Skate class nuclear powered submarine commissioned in 1958
