= Bath salts (disambiguation) =

Bath salts are minerals added to water for bathing.

Bath salts or Bath Salts may also refer to:

- Bath salts (drug), a group of designer drugs
- "Bath Salts", a song by DMX from Exodus
- "Bath Salts", a song by Kitty
- "Bathsalts", a song by Blank Banshee from Blank Banshee 0
