= Honeybee Table at the Butterfly Feast =

Studio album by Teen Suicide
- Released: August 26, 2022
- Length: 49:33
- Label: Run for Cover

Teen Suicide chronology
It's the Big Joyous Celebration, Let's Stir the Honeypot (2016)	Honeybee Table at the Butterfly Feast (2022)	Nude descending staircase headless (2026)

Singles from Honeybee Table at the Butterfly Feast
- 1. "Coyote (2015-2021)" Released: April 27, 2022; 2. "Get High, Breathe Underwater (#3)" Released: July 12, 2022; 3. "Death Wish" Released: August 3, 2022; 4. "New Strategies for Telemarketing Through Precognitive Dreams" Released: August 15, 2022

Professional ratings
Review scores
Source	Rating
Pitchfork	6.7/10

Honeybee Table at the Butterfly Feast (stylized in all lowercase) is the third studio album by American indie rock band Teen Suicide. The album was released on August 26, 2022, on Run for Cover Records.

== Track listing ==
All tracks are written by Sam Ray.

Honeybee Table at the Butterfly Feast track listing
No.	Title	Length
1.	"You Were My Star"	1:01
2.	"Death Wish"	2:44
3.	"Get High, Breathe Underwater (#3)"	3:51
4.	"Unwanted Houseguest"	3:33
5.	"Groceries"	3:30
6.	"I Will Always Be in Love With You (Final)"	2:20
7.	"New Strategies for Telemarketing Through Precognitive Dreams"	3:09
8.	"Violence Violence"	2:14
9.	"Coyote (2015-2021)"	6:18
10.	"Every Time I Hear Your Name Called"	2:23
11.	"You Can't Blame Me"	2:05
12.	"It Was Probably Nothing but for a Moment There I Lost All Sense of Feeling"	3:53
13.	"All of Us Steady Dying"	2:14
14.	"Complaining in Dreams"	3:47
15.	"How to Disappear in America Without a Trace"	3:29
16.	"Another Life (Bootleg)"	3:03

Notes

- All tracks are stylized in all lowercase.
