= Anisotremus virginicus =

- In Belize

Conservation status
- Least Concern (IUCN 3.1)

Scientific classification
- Kingdom: Animalia
- Phylum: Chordata
- Class: Actinopterygii
- Division: Teleostei
- Order: Acanthuriformes
- Family: Haemulidae
- Genus: Anisotremus
- Species: A. virginicus

Binomial name
- Anisotremus virginicus (Linnaeus, 1758)

Synonyms
- Sparus virginicus Linnaeus, 1758

Species of fish

Anisotremus virginicus, the porkfish, also known as the Atlantic porkfish, sweetlips, dogfish, or paragrate grunt, is a species of marine ray-finned fish, a grunt belonging to the family Haemulidae. It is native to the western Atlantic Ocean.

== Taxonomy ==
Anisotremus virginicus was first formally described in 1758 as Sparus virginicus by Linnaeus, with the type locality given as South America. When American ichthyologist Theodore Nicholas Gill created the genus Anisotremus, he renamed Sparus virginicus and made it the type species.

== Distribution ==
Anisotremus virginicus is found in the western Atlantic Ocean from northeastern Florida south along its Atlantic coast to the Bahamas, then westwards into the Gulf of Mexico from the Florida Keys north to New Port Richey on Florida's Gulf Coast. Within the gulf, it is found at the Flower Garden Banks and on the Mexican coast as far south as the northern Yucatan Peninsula and also northwestern Cuba. It then ranges southwards throughout the Caribbean Sea, to South America as far south as Rio de Janeiro. It can also be found at Fernando de Noronha and Atoll das Rocas. It is an introduced species at Bermuda.

== Description ==
Anisotremus virginicus has a deep, compressed body with a very high back and a short, blunt head. The mouth is positioned low on the head, it is horizontal with fleshy lips and the jaws are equipped with bands of teeth on both jaws. The outer band of teeth is conical in shape.

The flanks are marked with alternating yellow and silver stripes. A black bar runs diagonally from over the eye to the upper lip and a second, vertical black bar runs from the front of the dorsal fin to the base of the pectoral fin. They have yellow fins; the caudal fin is deeply forked. The juveniles do not have the two black bars and have two black stripes that run horizontally along the middle of the flanks and a black blotch close to the caudal fin base, and the head is vivid yellow.

The dorsal fin contains 12 spines and 16–18 soft rays, while the anal fin contains three spines and 9 soft rays. This species attains a maximum total length of 40.6 cm (16.0 in), although 25 cm (9.8 in) is more typical, and the maximum published weight is 930 g (33 oz).

== Habitat and biology ==
A porkfish swimming in a tank

Anisotremus virginicus inhabits reefs and areas of rock substrate in shallow inshore waters at depths of 2.0–20 m (6.6–65.6 ft). The juveniles are found in beds of sea grass.

It is a nocturnal species, which frequently moves around in large schools, occasionally swimming with white grunts. This species can produce a grunting sound, as can all the grunts, by grinding its teeth together. It feeds mainly on benthic invertebrates such as molluscs, crustaceans, echinoderms, polychaetes, and annelids. The juveniles act as cleaner fish, picking parasites from the skin and scales of other species of fish.

== Uses ==
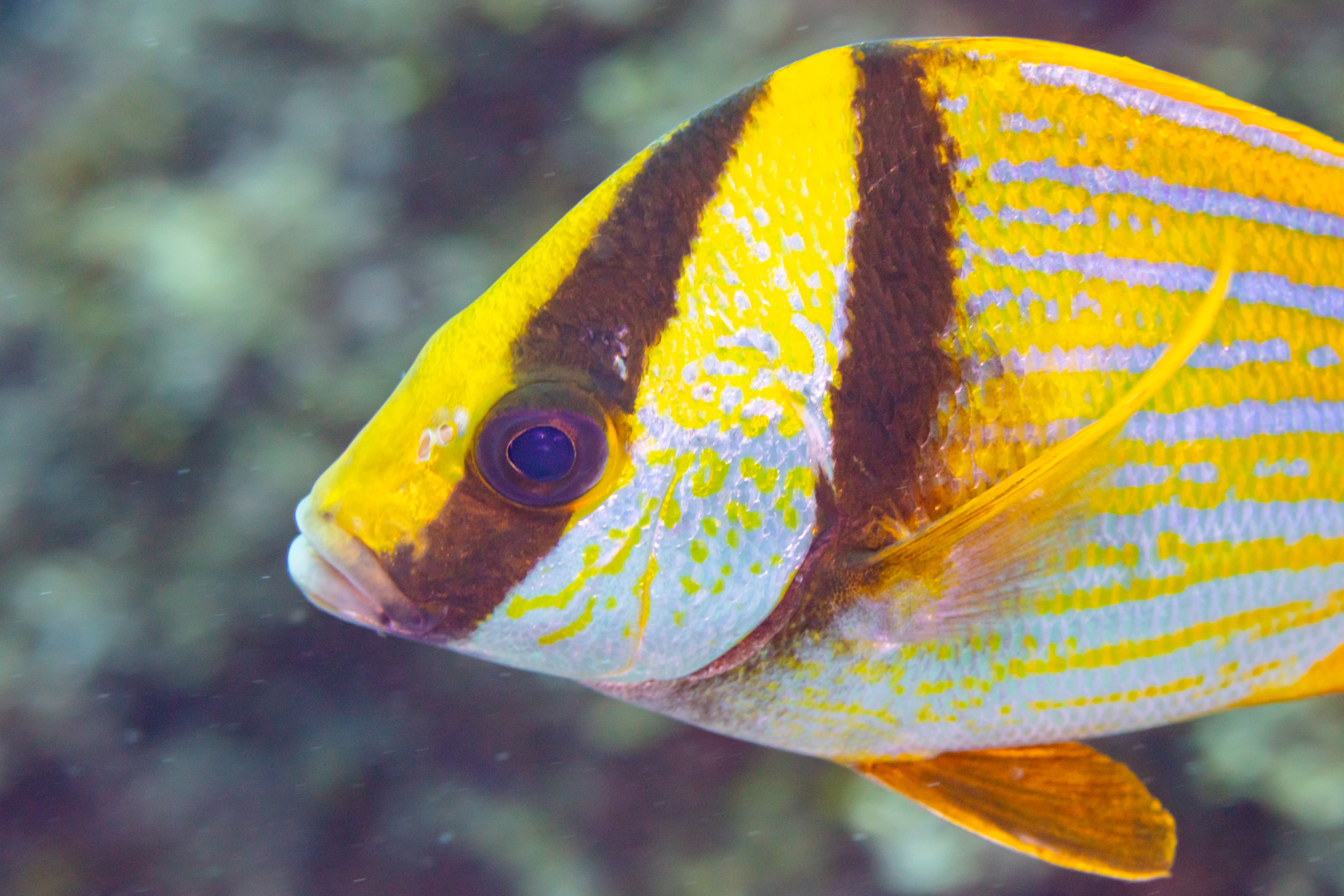
Detail of the head

Anisotremus virginicus is of minor importance to commercial fisheries and is caught using a variety of methods. It is considered a good sportfishing quarry and appears in the aquarium trade. The species has been bred in captivity.
