= It's the Big Joyous Celebration, Let's Stir the Honeypot =

Studio album by Teen Suicide
- Released: April 1, 2016
- Genre: Indie rock; lo-fi; dream pop; psychedelic folk; post-punk
- Length: 68:21
- Label: Run for Cover

Teen Suicide chronology
I Will Be My Own Hell Because There Is a Devil Inside My Body (2012)	It's the Big Joyous Celebration, Let's Stir the Honeypot (2016)	Honeybee Table at the Butterfly Feast (2022)

Singles from It's the Big Joyous Celebration, Let's Stir the Honeypot
- 1. "Alex" Released: February 2, 2016; 2. "The Stomach of the Earth" Released: February 22, 2016; 3. "The Big Joyous Celebration" Released: March 18, 2016

It's the Big Joyous Celebration, Let's Stir the Honeypot is the second studio album by American indie rock band Teen Suicide. The album was released on April 1, 2016 on Run for Cover Records.

== Critical reception ==
Professional ratings
Aggregate scores
Source	Rating
Metacritic	79/100
Review scores
Source	Rating
AllMusic	3.5/5 stars
Consequence of Sound	B+
DIY	3/5 stars
Exclaim!	8/10
Pitchfork	7.8/10
Spin	9/10

It's the Big Joyous Celebration, Let's Stir the Honeypot received generally favourable reviews from contemporary music critics. At Metacritic, which assigns a normalized rating out of 100 to reviews from mainstream critics, the album received an average score of 79, based on 6 reviews, which indicates "generally favorable reviews".

David Sackllah of Spin praised the album, stating, "For a lo-fi project, Celebration is a particularly imaginative, lengthy work full of vivid character portraits, using additional instrumentation and computer-generated distortion to expand far beyond the boundaries of more straightforward guitar-driven indie acts."

Ian Cohen of Pitchfork Media gave the album a favorable review, stating, "The directness with which it speaks to its audience makes it easy to imagine Celebration inspiring a lot of its younger listeners to start a band. For anyone else, it’s just an inspiring testament to indie rock’s continued vitality."

Will Richards of DIY was more critical of the album, stating, "Teen Suicide’s final act is nigh-on impossible to categorise or fully digest, and its nature and length makes it at the same time a difficult listen, but one that brings rewards of all different kinds across its running length."

== Track listing ==
All tracks are written by Sam Ray, except where noted.

No.	Title	Writer(s)	Length
1.	"Living Proof"	Max Kuzmiay; Sean Mercer	4:28
2.	"The Big Joyous Celebration"		2:13
3.	"Alex"		2:46
4.	"Violets"		1:42
5.	"Obvious Love"		2:33
6.	"It's Just a Pop Song"		4:01
7.	"V.I.P."		2:07
8.	"Wild Thing Runs Free"		2:39
9.	"Bright Blue Pickup Truck"		2:40
10.	"Big Mistake"		1:13
11.	"What You Want"		2:32
12.	"God"		2:00
13.	"Neighborhood Drug Dealer"		2:11
14.	"Have a Conversation"		1:19
15.	"Beauty"		2:12
16.	"Pavement"		2:00
17.	"America"		2:36
18.	"Devotion"		3:12
19.	"The Things I Love Are Killing Me"		1:35
20.	"Falling Out of Love with Me"		3:36
21.	"I Don't Think It's Too Late"		2:39
22.	"Long Way Down"		3:45
23.	"My Little World"		2:23
24.	"The Hurricane"	Sam Ray; Spencer Radcliffe	2:47
25.	"The Stomach of the Earth"		4:33
26.	"If I Don't See You Before You Leave"		2:39
Total length:			68:21

== Personnel ==
Teen Suicide

- Sam Ray – music, lyrics, recording (1, 2, 4–21, 23–26)
- John Toohey – additional guitar (3), additional vocals (2)
- Alec Simke – bass (3, 11, 12, 18), additional vocals (2)
- Sean Mercer – drums (1, 3, 22), recording (1, 3, 22), engineering (1, 3, 22), mixing (1, 3, 22), additional vocals (1, 2)

Additional personnel

- Eric Livingston – drums (12, 18)
- Dexter Tortoriello – additional instrumentation (9), additional production (9)
- Spencer Radcliffe – co-writing (24), additional keyboards (24), additional drums (24), additional lyrics (24), horns (24), additional vocals (2, 6, 13, 24)
- Delaney Mills – additional percussion (5)
- Max Kuzmyak – trumpet (1)
- Caroline White – additional vocals (2, 6, 12)
- David Courtright – additional vocals (2)
- Harmony Tividad – additional vocals (2, 4, 9, 13)
- Josephine Ray – additional vocals (2)
- Kinsey Matthews – additional vocals (2)
- Lexi Williams – additional vocals (6)
- Liz Sea – additional vocals (2)
- Madeline Ava – additional vocals (21)
- Neil Sanzgiri – additional vocals (2)
- Owen Pallett – additional vocals (2)
