= 2 Minutes =

2 Minutes may refer to:

- "2 Minutes", a 2018 song by Cupcakke from Ephorize
- "2 Minutes", a 2017 song by Kitty from Miami Garden Club
- "2 Minutes", a 2018 song by Praiz
- "2 Minutes", a 2002 song by Tom Gurl Four
- Studio 2 Minutes, French animation studio

== See also ==
- "Two Minutes", a 2020 episode of the TV series Homeland
- 2 minutter (English: 2 Minutes), 2001 Danish short film
