= Kitty discography =

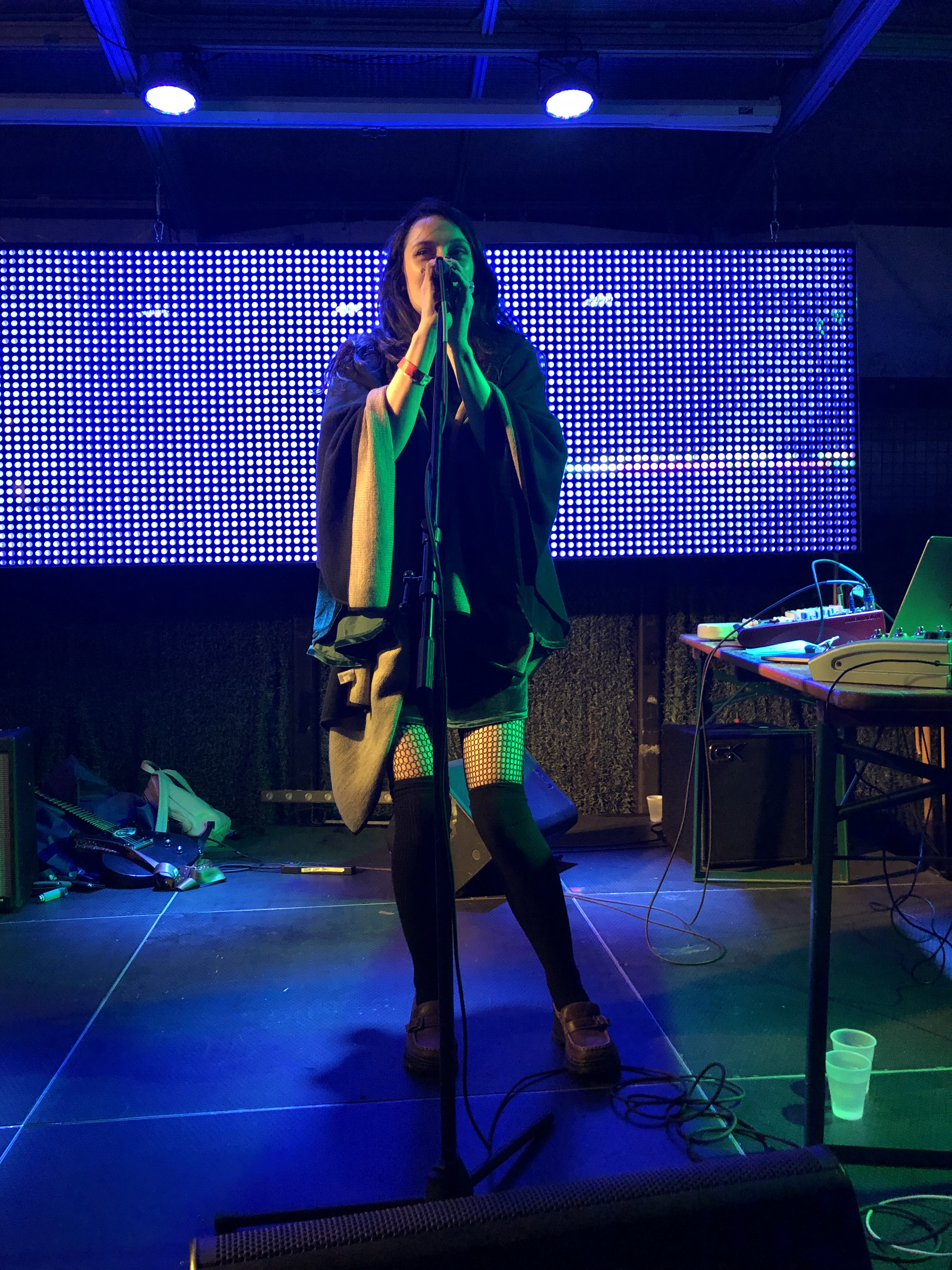
- Studio albums: 2
- EPs: 10
- Compilation albums: 3
- Singles: 28
- Music videos: 21
- Mixtapes: 1
- Remixes: 12

American singer Kitty has released two studio albums, one mixtape, two compilation albums, ten extended plays, and twenty-eight singles (including four as a featured artist). Kitty began rapping in 2010, and shared her music online under the stage name Kitty Pryde. In 2011, she served as a member of hip-hop group Jokers in Trousers. The group released a self-titled EP, which would be their only release before disbanding. In July 2011, Kitty released a solo mixtape titled The Lizzie McGuire Experience.

Kitty released her first EP, Haha, I'm Sorry, in June 2012. The EP was preceded by the single "Okay Cupid", which became an internet sensation. A second EP, titled D.A.I.S.Y. Rage, was released in January 2013. It would be Kitty's first release under her current mononym stage name. The EP spawned the singles "Hittin Lix", "Dead Island" and "Ay Shawty 3.0".

In 2014, Kitty released three extended plays. The first, Impatiens, was released in May. An outtake, titled "Marijuana", was released as a single the following month. In June, Kitty released Don't Let Me Do This Again, an EP made up of cover songs. The final extended play, Frostbite, was released in November. The EP saw Kitty move away from her hip-hop beginnings, and opt to experiment with trance and electro music. It includes the pre-singles "Second Life", "285", and "Miss U".

Kitty began working on her debut studio album in 2015. The album, Miami Garden Club, was crowdfunded by fans and released in August 2017. Stylistically, it was influenced by '80s and '90s pop music. To promote the album, Kitty released the single "Asari Love Song" as part of the Adult Swim Singles Program 2016. The album also features Kitty's Adult Swim single from 2015, "Drink Tickets". Two album tracks—the title track and "Mass Text Booty Call"—received music videos.

In July 2018, Kitty announced that her second album would be titled Rose Gold. The first single, "Counting All the Starfish", was released via Bandcamp on September 30, 2018. On February 26, 2017, Kitty shared a new track from Rose Gold titled "Disconnect", and revealed that the album would be released in April 2019. The album was made available to pre-order on March 22, 2019, and was released on April 5.

Kitty released an extended play titled Charm and Mirror in June 2020. It was preceded by the single "Baby Pink".

Since 2016, Kitty has worked on a number of music projects alongside her husband, music producer Sam Ray. The pair formed the EDM duo 56colors in June 2016. Under this name, they have produced a number of remixes of other artists' music. Kitty and Ray have also collaborated on acoustic tracks, including the 2017 single "Hollywood". In 2018, the couple formed The Pom-Poms, their rave-pop music project. Kitty has described the project as "what happened when we decided to let go of heavy feelings and just turn the fuck up" and as "cheerleader music". The Pom-Poms' self-titled debut EP was released in September 2018. Their second EP, I Was on the News, was released in December 2019.

== Albums ==
=== Studio albums ===
Title	Album details	Peak chart positions
Title	Album details	US Dance
Miami Garden Club	Released: August 25, 2017; Label: Pretty Wavvy; Formats: CD, LP, digital download	—
Rose Gold	Released: April 5, 2019; Label: Pretty Wavvy; Formats: CD, cassette, digital download	9
"—" denotes an album that did not chart in that territory.

=== Mixtapes ===
Title	Details
The Lizzie McGuire Experience (Note: Kitty's debut mixtape, (originally titled The Lizzy McGuire Experience), which compiled all of her early material from Tumblr, including the seven tracks from the Jokers in Trousers EP. It was rereleased on Bandcamp on December 22, 2011, with an abridged tracklist and a new track, "Hood Friday".)	Released: July 21, 2011; Label: Self-released; Format: Digital download

=== Compilation albums ===
Title	Details
Songs from Different Stuff	Released: October 27, 2016; Label: Self-released; Format: CD
Kickstarter Only	Released: November 1, 2017; Label: Self-released; Format: CD
Sounds You Can Use for Whatever U Want	Released: August 28, 2023; Label: Pretty Wavvy; Format: Digital download

== Extended plays ==
Title	Details
Jokers in Trousers (with Jokers in Trousers)	Released: May 24, 2011; Label: Self-released; Format: Digital download
Haha, I'm Sorry	Released: June 11, 2012; Label: Self-released; Format: Digital download
D.A.I.S.Y. Rage	Released: January 31, 2013; Label: Self-released; Format: Digital download
Impatiens	Released: May 13, 2014; Label: Self-released; Format: Digital download
Don't Let Me Do This Again	Released: June 27, 2014; Label: Self-released; Format: Digital download
Frostbite	Released: November 18, 2014; Label: Self-released; Format: Digital download
Frostbite: The Remixes	Released: March 9, 2015; Label: Self-released; Format: Digital download
The Pom-Poms (with Sam Ray as The Pom-Poms)	Released: September 28, 2018; Label: Pretty Wavvy; Format: Digital download
I Was on the News (with Sam Ray as The Pom-Poms)	Released: December 6, 2019; Label: Pretty Wavvy; Format: Digital download
Charm and Mirror	Released: June 26, 2020; Label: Pretty Wavvy; Format: Digital download
Pink Salt	Released: February 1, 2022; Label: Pretty Wavvy; Format: Digital download

== Singles ==
=== As lead artist ===
List of singles as lead artist, showing year released and album name
Title	Year	Album(s)
"Time Is the Donut of the Heart!!!"	2012	Non-album singles
"Quarantine" (Max B cover)	2012	Non-album singles
"My Worst Song Yet"	2012	Non-album singles
"Justin Bieber!!!!!"	2012	Non-album singles
"Okay Cupid"	2012	Haha, I'm Sorry
"Hittin Lix"	2012	D.A.I.S.Y. Rage
"How 2 B a Heartbreaker???"	2012	Non-album single
"Dead Island"	2013	D.A.I.S.Y. Rage
"Ay Shawty 3.0" (featuring Lakutis)	2013	D.A.I.S.Y. Rage
"Barbie Jeep"	2013	Adult Swim Singles Program 2013
"Second Life"	2013	Frostbite
"285"	2014	Frostbite
"Marijuana"	2014	Non-album single
"Miss U"	2014	Frostbite
"Drink Tickets"	2015	Adult Swim Singles Program 2015
"Asari Love Song"	2016	Adult Swim Singles Program 2016, Miami Garden Club
"Miami Garden Club"	2017	Miami Garden Club
"Hollywood" (with Sam Ray)	2017	Non-album single
"Recccord"	2018	Adult Swim Singles Program 2017
"Counting All the Starfish"	2018	Rose Gold
"Head over Heels"	2019	Non-album single
"I Was on the News" (with Sam Ray as The Pom-Poms)	2019	I Was on the News
"Baby Pink"	2020	Charm and Mirror

=== Promotional singles ===
List of promotional singles, showing year released and album name
Title	Year	Album
"Disconnect"	2019	Rose Gold

=== As featured artist ===
List of singles as featured artist, showing year released and album name
Title	Year	Album
"Trash Talking Love" (The Ready Set featuring Kitty)	2014	Non-album singles
"Me + You" (Chippy Nonstop featuring Kitty)	2014	Non-album singles
"Get U 2 Dance" (Boy Sim featuring Kitty)	2018	Pink Noise
"Don't Even Bother" (Must Die! featuring The Pom-Poms)	2020	Crisis Vision

== Guest appearances ==
List of non-single guest appearances, showing year released and album name
Title	Year	Other performer(s)	Album
"Implants and Yankee Candles"	2012	None	Chopped and Scrooged (mixtape by Sufjan Stevens)
"Pocahontas"	2013	Le1f	Fly Zone
"Bubblegum"	2013	Chippy Nonstop	Finally Verified
"56k" (remix)	2013	Hot Sugar, Big Baby Gandhi, Nasty Nigel, Lansky, Antwon, Chippy Nonstop, Lakutis, DVS, NE$$	Made Man
"Day / Night / Sleep System"	2013	Ryan Hemsworth, Haleek Maul	Guilt Trips
"Spotless"	2013	Sasha Go Hard, Tink	Out of Towner Vol. 1 (mixtape by Druture)
"Brush Me Off"	2014	Pat Lukens (as Max LeRoy), Sad Andy	Max LeRoy Volume I
"Love Me Not"	2014	None	Rap Genius Tape (Volume 1)
"Tap Twice"	2014	Speak	Sex Quest
"Unbox Me"	2016	Decktonic	Unbox Me
"Starfish" (remix of track by Disasterpeace)	2017	None	Beasts of Balance: RMX KIT
"A Salad Named Elizabeth"	2017	Killer Refrigerator	Refrigeration Plague
"Just in Case"	2019	Sam Ray	Rainswept – Original Soundtrack
"Universe Away"	2019	Sam Ray	Rainswept – Original Soundtrack

== Remixes ==
Title	Year	Original artist(s)
"How to Be a Heartbreaker" (Kitty Pryde remix) (Also known as "How 2 B a Heartbreaker???")	2012	Marina and the Diamonds
"Cut It" (56colors edit) (with Sam Ray as 56colors)	2016	O.T. Genasis (featuring Young Thug and Kevin Gates)
"Pom Poms Down" (with Sam Ray as 56colors; remix of "Hollaback Girl")	2016	Gwen Stefani
"In2u" (with Sam Ray as 56colors; remix of "Into You")	2017	Ariana Grande
"Starfish"	2017	Disasterpeace
"F*ck the P*in Aw*y" (with Sam Ray as 56colors; remix of "Fuck the Pain Away")	2017	Peaches
"Poop?" (with Sam Ray as 56colors; remix of "Lift Yourself")	2018	Kanye West
"My Drip" (56colors remix) (with Sam Ray as 56colors)	2018	Lil Baby
"Oh (No)" (with Sam Ray as 56colors; mashup of "Rill Rill" and "Oh")	2018	Sleigh Bells, Ciara
"509 Seabreeze" (The Pom-Poms remix) (with Sam Ray as The Pom-Poms)	2018	Kitty
"Sugar & Spice" (Kitty remix)	2019	vverevvolf
"Rhodonite and Grief" (Kitty remix)	2019	La Dispute

== Music videos ==
=== As lead artist ===
Title	Year	Director(s)	Ref.
"Okay Cupid"	2012	Bryan McKay & Shannen Ortale	
"Justin Bieber!!!!!"	2012	Count Backwards	
"Orion's Belt" (featuring Riff Raff)	2012	Jason Miller	
"Dead Island"	2013	Steamclam	
"Ay Shawty 3.0" (featuring Lakutis)	2013	Peter Wu	
"Hittin Lixxx"	2013	Jordan Levine	
"BrB"	2014	Kitty	
"Marijuana"	2014	Kitty & Shomi Patwary	
"Second Life"	2014	Jesse Gouldsbury & Johnny Weiss	
"Miami Garden Club"	2017	Kitty & Sam Ray	
"Mass Text Booty Call" (featuring Sprightly)	2017	Cody Dobie	
"I Got That Boom" (with Sam Ray as The Pom-Poms)	2018	Kitty & Sam Ray	
"Mary Poppins" (Lyric Video) (with Sam Ray as The Pom-Poms)	2018	Kitty & Sam Ray	
"Disconnect"	2019	Kitty	
"Mami"	2019	Kitty	
"Baby Pink"	2020	Kitty	
"Bath Salts"	2020	Kitty	
"Afterglow"	2020	Kitty	

=== As featured artist ===
Title	Year	Other artist	Director	Ref.
"Bubblegum"	2013	Chippy Nonstop	Jon Casey	

=== Guest appearances ===
Title	Year	Artist	Director	Ref.
"Ur So Rad"	2014	Black Heart's Society	Miguelangelo Hexylvania	
"Never Alone in a Dark Room"	2017	Ricky Eat Acid	Sam Ray	
