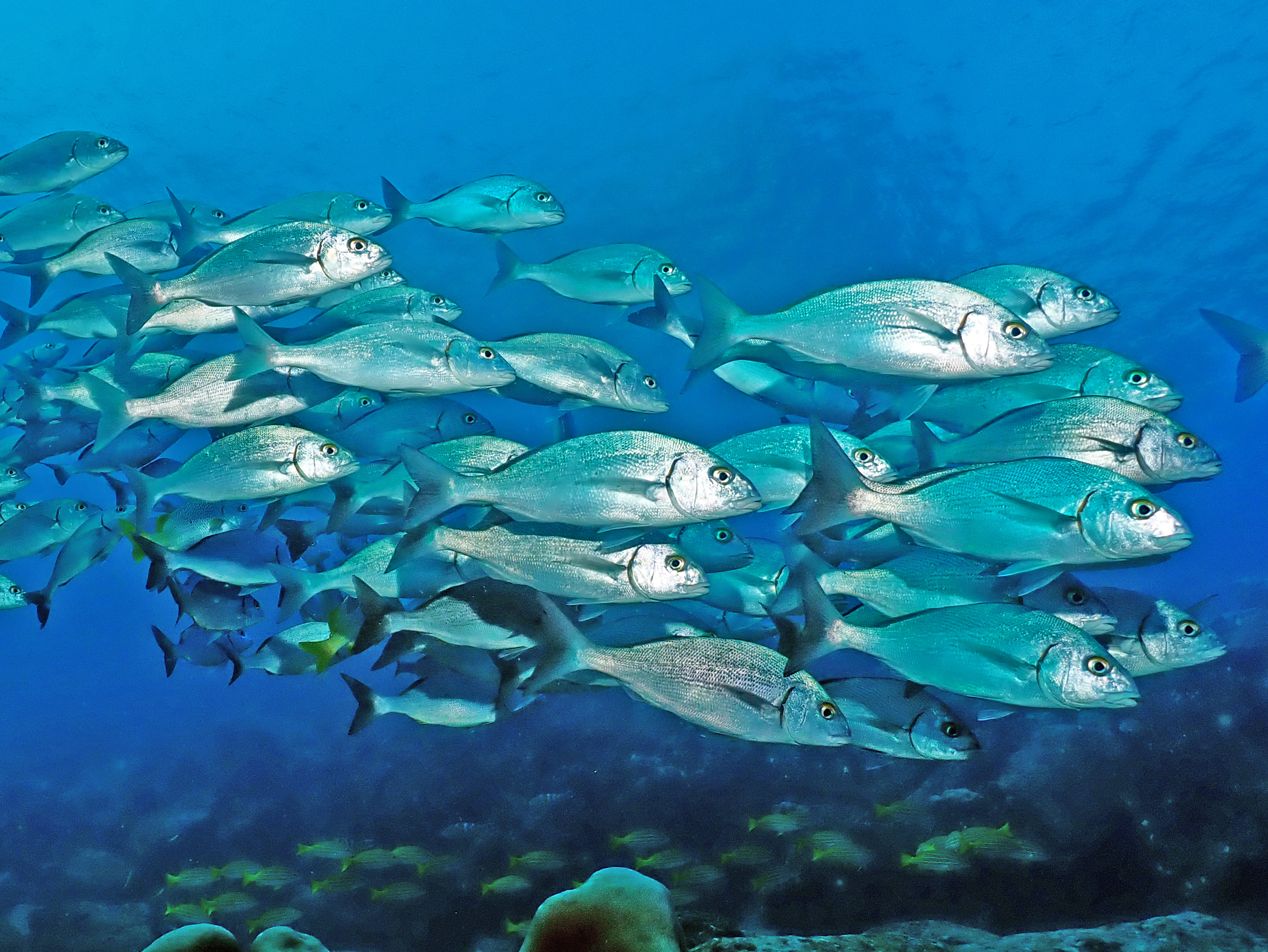
- School of Orthopristis forbesi from Galapagos Islands

Conservation status
- Least Concern (IUCN 3.1)

Scientific classification
- Kingdom: Animalia
- Phylum: Chordata
- Class: Actinopterygii
- Order: Acanthuriformes
- Family: Haemulidae
- Genus: Orthopristis
- Species: O. forbesi

Binomial name
- Orthopristis forbesi D. S. Jordan & Starks, 1897

= Orthopristis forbesi =

Species of fish

Orthopristis forbesi, the Forbe's grunt, is a species of ray-finned fish, a grunt belonging to the family Haemulidae.

== Etymology ==
The generic name Orthopristis is from Ancient Greek ortho, meaning straight and pristis meaning saw. The species name honors the naturalist Stephen Alfred Forbes (1844–1930).

== Distribution ==
Orthopristis forbesi is endemic to the Galapagos Islands.

== Description ==
Orthopristis forbesi can reach at least a length of about 36 centimetres (14 in). It has a body which is elongated and slender, as well as being strongly laterally compressed. Mouth is short, with thin lips. The caudal fin is dusky and deeply forked. The opercular membrane is dark. The overall colour is silvery.

This species is quite similar and may mingle with Yellowtail grunts (Anisotremus interruptus) and Golden-eyed grunts (Haemulon scudderii).

== Biology ==
This oviparous species is tropical and reef-associated. It can be found at depths between 3 and 30 m (10 and 100 ft). It forms schools close to rocky reefs and hard substrate with good water movement.

== Bibliography ==
- Gilbert, C. H. (1897). "Descriptions of twenty-two new species of fishes collected by the steamer Albatross, of the United States Fish Commission". Proceedings of the United States National Museum. 19 (1115): 437–457, Pls. 49-55. doi:10.5479/si.00963801.19-1115.437.
- Allen, G.R.; D.R. Robertson (1994). Fishes of the tropical eastern Pacific. Honolulu: University of Hawaii Press.
- Girard, C. F. (1858). "Notes upon various new genera and new species of fishes, in the museum of the Smithsonian Institution, and collected in connection with the United States and Mexican boundary survey: Major William Emory, Commissioner. Proc". Acad. Nat. Sci. Phila. 10: 167–171.
