= Kitty (musician) =

American singer (born 1993)

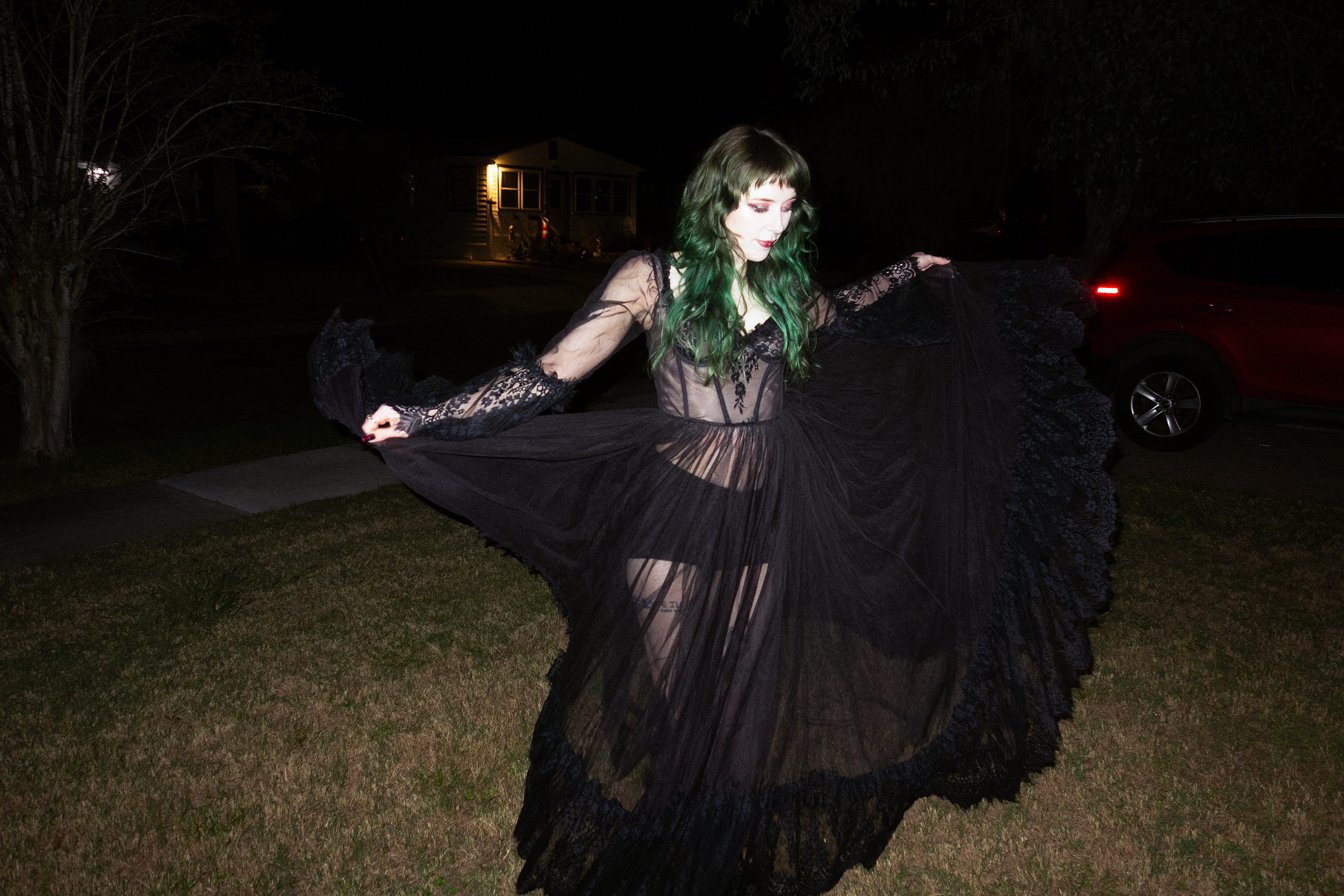
- Kitty in 2025

Background information
- Also known as: Kitty Pryde; Kitty Ray; Miel; Kit
- Born: Kathryn-Leigh Beckwith; February 25, 1993 (age 33); Plantation, Florida, U.S.
- Origin: DeLand, Florida, U.S.
- Genres: Cloud rap; synth-pop
- Occupations: Rapper; singer; record producer
- Years active: 2010–present
- Member of: Teen Suicide; The Pom-Poms
- Spouse: Sam Ray (m. 2016)
- Website: kittywavvy.com

Kathryn-Leigh Beckwith (born February 25, 1993), known professionally as Kitty and Kitty Ray, is an American singer and music producer. She started her career in music as a teenager, uploading original songs to her Tumblr blog under the name Kitty Pryde.

Between the years of 2011 and 2014, Kitty released several singles and extended plays. In May 2012, she uploaded the homemade music video for her song "Okay Cupid" to YouTube; the song became viral and Rolling Stone ranked the hit single as number 17 of 50 Best Songs of 2012. Later that year, in June 2012, Kitty collaborated with American rapper Riff Raff on the song "Orion's Belt". Kitty released her debut, full-length pop album, Miami Garden Club, in 2017. In 2019, Kitty released Rose Gold, and the album charted at number 9 in Billboard's Dance/Electronic Albums charts.

Since 2011, Kitty has a diverse discography, which includes projects spanning genres from alternative hip-hop to avant synth-pop. Kitty has composed music for several video games, including games Beasts of Balance: Battles, Spin Rhythm, and Rainswept. In 2016, Kitty formed 56colors, an electronic music duo, alongside husband Sam Ray, the lead vocalist and guitarist of American indie rock band Teen Suicide. Kitty is a vocalist in Teen Suicide, which she joined in 2018. In 2018, Kitty and her husband formed the Pom-Poms and released the rave-pop duo's debut self-titled EP.

== Early life ==
Kitty was a clerk at Claire's in Daytona Beach. She started college when she was 16, and signed up to attend classes at the University of Central Florida.

== Career ==
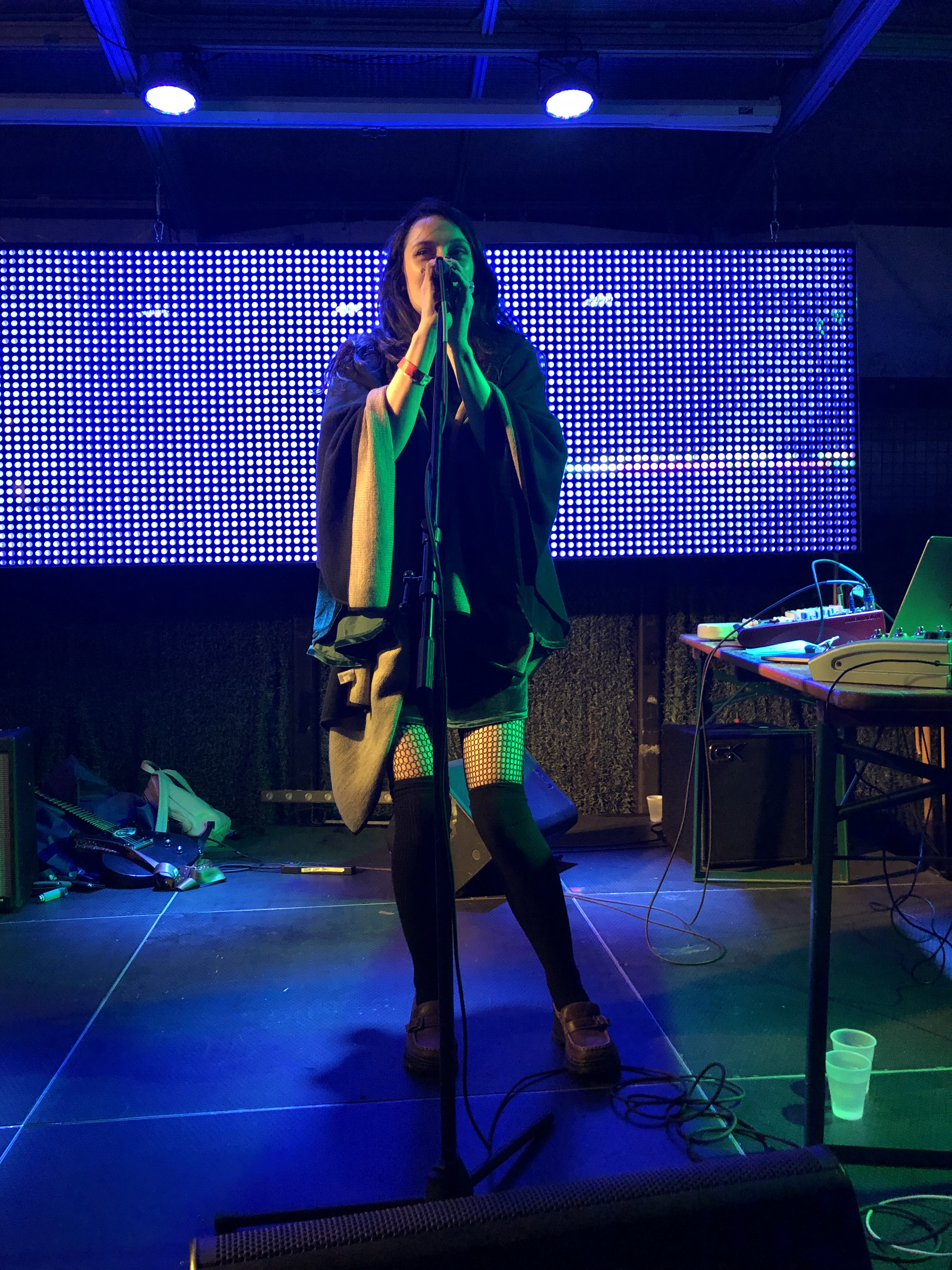
Kitty performing in 2022

=== 2010–2011: Jokers in Trousers and The Lizzie McGuire Experience ===
In high school, Kitty was interested in writing poetry, and was encouraged by a classmate to try rapping. She wrote songs about an ex-boyfriend as a joke, and shared them via Tumblr. Her first song, titled "Sickfit", was shared in September 2010. In 2011, Kitty—then known as Kitty Pryde—fronted the four-piece hip-hop group Jokers in Trousers. The other members of the all-female group were known as Hamtaro, Mimi-Chan and HH Slider. They released a self-titled extended play on May 24, 2011. This would be the group's only release.

In July 2011, one of Kitty's Tumblr followers compiled a mixtape out of songs ripped from her blog, and made it available to download through MediaFire. The mixtape, called The Lizzie McGuire Experience, included the 8 tracks from the Jokers in Trousers EP and 4 other songs. Despite the unofficial nature of the release, Kitty shared the download link through her social media pages. On December 22, 2011, Kitty re-released The Lizzie McGuire Experience via Bandcamp. This version contains a shorter track listing, and one new track: "Hood Friday", a cover of "Good Friday" by Why?. Kitty has since admitted to disliking and being embarrassed of the album.

=== 2012–2013: Haha, I'm Sorry and D.A.I.S.Y. Rage ===
Kitty released her first single, "Time Is the Donut of the Heart!!!", on January 9, 2012. The song samples J Dilla's "Time: The Donut of the Heart". It was followed up by a series of singles, including a cover of Max B's "Quarantine", and original songs "My Worst Song Yet" and "Justin Bieber!!!!!". Kitty's breakout fourth single, "Okay Cupid", was released on April 11, 2012. The music video, released the following month, went viral on YouTube, causing the song to become an internet sensation. "Okay Cupid" served as the sole single from Kitty's debut solo EP, Haha, I'm Sorry—released on June 11, 2012. The EP features guest vocals from fellow rappers Riff Raff and Dankte. The final track, "Give Me Scabies", samples vocals from Carly Rae Jepsen's "Call Me Maybe", and saxophone from Kenny G's "Sentimental". A music video for the Riff Raff collaboration "Orion's Belt" was released on June 18, 2012, through the Noisey YouTube channel.

On August 1, 2012, Kitty released a new song titled "Hittin Lix". The single preceded the EP D.A.I.S.Y. Rage, which was released on January 31, 2013. It was premiered by Rolling Stone, whom Kitty told, "I exist in the real world now. It's going to be nice because people won't be able to just say that I'm a meme anymore." The EP saw Kitty take her music in a more serious direction. Unlike earlier releases, the tracks were recorded in a studio. The second and final single from the EP, "Ay Shawty 3.0", was released on June 18, 2013. An accompanying music video was uploaded to YouTube the following day. The track features rapper Lakutis, and is a reworking of "Ay Shawty: The Shrekoning!!!!" from Haha, I'm Sorry. D.A.I.S.Y Rage was Kitty's first release under her mononymous stage name, rather than Kitty Pryde. She had chosen the name "Kitty Pryde" as a reference to the Marvel superhero but dropped the "Pryde" because of displeased Marvel fans.

=== 2013–2015: Impatiens, Don't Let Me Do This Again and Frostbite ===
On June 17, 2013, Kitty released a song titled "Barbie Jeep" as part of the Adult Swim Singles Program. The song was later removed from the Adult Swim website, after Kitty was sued for using lyrics similar to those by another band. On November 8, 2013, Kitty shared the track "Second Life" via SoundCloud. It was intended to promote her debut album—to be titled Flowerviolence—which was reportedly near completion at the time. The album was scheduled for release in the winter of 2013–2014, but was delayed. A second track from the album, "285", was leaked by Kitty on February 6, 2014. The song is about the closing of the Brooklyn underground music venue 285 Kent.

On May 13, 2014, Kitty released an EP titled Impatiens, named for the impatiens genus of flowers. The EP consists of 4 new songs and, as bonus tracks, the previously released singles "Second Life" and "Barbie Jeep". This version of "Barbie Jeep" is a new mix, stylized as "Barbie J33p". Kitty made visual components for each of the 4 new tracks. She shared these videos via Tumblr on the day of the EP's release. An official music video was made for "BrB ( ˘ ³˘)❤"; the first music video directed by Kitty herself. An outtake from the EP, "Marijuana", was released as a single on June 18, 2014, and the accompanying music video was released on June 30. The song samples "Marijuana" by Chrome Sparks, which, in turn, samples "Could Heaven Ever Be Like This" by Idris Muhammad.

Kitty recorded a series of covers one night while "drunk in [her] room alone", and released them on June 27, 2014, as an EP titled Don't Let Me Do This Again.

On November 10, 2014, Kitty shared the song "Miss U" from her upcoming album. The album's working title, Flowerviolence, was abandoned by Kitty when Lana Del Rey released her similarly titled album Ultraviolence. It had originally been promoted as Kitty's debut album, but materialized as a 5-track EP. The EP, renamed Frostbite, was released on November 18, 2014. It includes the pre-singles "Second Life", "285", and "Miss U". For the EP, Kitty experimented with trance and electro music, as she had gotten "over hip-hop". According to Kitty, she felt embarrassed of her earlier music, and was finally making songs she was proud of. Two of the songs sample remixes of My Little Pony songs. Frostbite reached number 6 on the iTunes album chart. A music video for "Second Life" was released on December 17, 2014. On March 9, 2015, Kitty released Frostbite: The Remixes; an EP of remixed tracks from Frostbite.

In 2015, she was chosen to perform as a headliner at Pacific Northwest music festival VanFest Five.

=== 2015–2017: Side projects and Miami Garden Club ===
Kitty's second contribution to the Adult Swim Singles Program, "Drink Tickets", was shared via SoundCloud on June 5, 2015. It was made available to download from the Adult Swim website on June 22.

In 2015, Kitty began working on her debut full-length album. She reportedly worked in the studio with big-name producers, but was unhappy with the results and decided to make the album herself. To fund the album, Kitty launched a campaign through the crowdfunding platform Kickstarter on August 11, 2015. The album's title was revealed to be Miami Garden Club. By the end of the one-month campaign, she raised $51,863 from 1,164 backers. According to the campaign, the album was expected for January 2016; but the release was pushed back.

On March 30, 2016, Kitty, under the name Miel, shared a demo on SoundCloud titled "Look Demure". She had revealed in 2015 that she was starting a new project named Miel (meaning honey), to keep her new dance music separate to her music as Kitty. From March–May 2016, Kitty shared several songs through the Miel SoundCloud account, including the demos "Look Demure" and "I'm Like a Broken Record Aren't I", and a cover of "Cry Me a River" by Justin Timberlake. The "Cry Me a River" cover was shared under the title "SexyBack Pt 2".

On October 12, 2016, Kitty released the track "Asari Love Song" as part of the Adult Swim Singles Program 2016. It also served as the debut single from her upcoming album. Kitty announced the album's completion on April 1, 2017. On July 28, 2017, the title track premiered with the release of its music video, and the album was made available to pre-order. Miami Garden Club was released on August 25, 2017; it was self-released through Kitty's own label Pretty Wavvy. Stylistically, it was influenced by '80s and '90s pop music. A music video for the album track "Mass Text Booty Call" was uploaded to YouTube on September 17, 2017.

In June 2016, Kitty and husband Sam Ray formed the music project 56colors. Kitty's "Miel" SoundCloud account was renamed "56colors", and re-purposed for sharing Kitty and Ray's new EDM songs. Throughout 2016 and 2017, the duo have released remixes of songs by O.T. Genasis, Gwen Stefani, Ariana Grande, and Peaches. On May 10, 2017, the original song "Hollywood" by Kitty and Sam Ray was shared through the SoundCloud account. The song was later released as a single through Kitty's Bandcamp, with all proceeds going towards the rebuilding of homes for Mexico earthquake victims. For this release, Kitty is credited as "Kit". On November 5, 2017, Kitty and Ray shared a cover of "Heretics" by Andrew Bird. The duo shared a demo titled "Mad Girl's Love Song" on Christmas Day, 2017. The song is intended for a new album that Kitty and Ray are working on together, which was announced upon the demo's release. They will release the album under a new band name, which has yet to be chosen.

In 2017, Kitty produced a remix of the song "Starfish" from the game Beasts of Balance. This led to her being chosen to compose the soundtrack to the game's Battles expansion pack, taking over from the original composer Disasterpeace. Production of the soundtrack began in December 2017, alongside sound design company Cassini Sound. This was Kitty's first time working on a video game soundtrack—a new career path which she would continue to pursue.

=== 2018: American Pleasure Club and the Pom-Poms ===
In 2018, Kitty joined the indie rock band American Pleasure Club as a vocalist. She provided vocals for the song "Eating Cherries" from the album A Whole Fucking Lifetime of This, released on February 16, 2018.

On March 14, 2018, Kitty released the track "Recccord" for the Adult Swim Singles Program. It is her fourth contribution to the program, following "Barbie Jeep", "Drink Tickets", and "Asari Love Song". The track is a new version of the 2016 demo "I'm Like a Broken Record Aren't I".

Kitty shared a new track, titled "Watch Me", via YouTube and SoundCloud on April 20, 2018. It was produced by Kitty and Sam Ray, credited as 56colors.

On July 7, 2018, Kitty revealed that her second album would be titled Rose Gold, and was scheduled for release in autumn 2018.

In August 2018, Kitty shared a clip of a new song that she produced for the video game Spin Rhythm, which is set to be released by Australian company Super Entertainment in 2019. The game will also feature her song "2 Minutes" from Miami Garden Club.

During an online Q&A with fans in July 2018, Kitty revealed that she and Sam Ray would be releasing a new EDM project in September. On September 7, the pair, under new band name the Pom-Poms, released the track "I Got That Boom". The accompanying music video was filmed by Kitty and Ray, and edited by Kitty. Upon the track's release, it was announced that a self-titled EP was scheduled for later in the month. On September 24, they shared another song from the upcoming release, titled "Mary Poppins". The Pom-Poms released their debut self-titled EP on September 28, 2018.

On September 30, 2018, Kitty released a single titled "Counting All the Starfish". The B-side, "Kit's Song", is performed by Sam Ray (as Ricky Eat Acid), and was written by Ray in dedication to Kitty. In November 2018, Kitty wrote and provided lead vocals for the American Pleasure Club single "If It's Your Final Wish I'll Make It Happen". She also provided vocals for the band's cover of "Yule Shoot Your Eye Out" by Fall Out Boy, released the following December.

=== 2019: Rose Gold and Pretty Wavvy ===
In February 2019, Kitty and Sam Ray collaborated on a cover of "Head over Heels" by Tears for Fears, which was released via Kitty's Bandcamp.

Kitty and Sam Ray composed two tracks—"Just in Case" and "Universe Away"—for the video game Rainswept. The game was released on February 1, 2019, and the soundtrack is available to download from Steam. This is Kitty's third time producing music for a video game, following her contributions to Beasts of Balance: Battles and Spin Rhythm.

On February 26, 2019, Kitty shared a new track titled "Disconnect", along with its music video. The track was shared to promote Kitty's then-upcoming second album Rose Gold. Upon the release of the video, Kitty revealed that the album—which was initially slated for a 2018 release—would be released in April 2019. Rose Gold was made available to pre-order on March 22, 2019. On March 31, Kitty shared an unofficial video for the album track "B.O.M.B. (Peter)". The album was released on April 5, 2019, along with visuals via YouTube for each track. Rose Gold is the first album that Kitty has produced entirely herself. Its album artwork was drawn by Kitty's mother-in-law, Josephine Ray. The album reached number 9 on Billboard's Dance/Electronic Albums charts.

On October 17, 2019, Kitty announced the formation of her label Pretty Wavvy. Formed by Kitty in partnership with Regime Music Group, Pretty Wavvy is home to all of Kitty's music and has signed artists including the Pom-Poms, Ricky Eat Acid, GFOTY, Pinky Swear, and onlytom.

== Personal life ==
On May 25, 2016, Kitty married musician Sam Ray. They both play in the indie rock band Teen Suicide, Ray performs guitar and vocals while Kitty plays keyboards.

Kitty is an advocate for mental health, and in 2015 she participated in Project UROK, a mental illness de-stigmatization initiative developed by the Child Mind Institute in 2014.

== Discography ==
- Miami Garden Club (2017)
- Rose Gold (2019)

== Filmography ==
Title	Year	Role	Director(s)	Notes
Ego Death	2013	Young girl	Sebastian Sommer	Short film; credited as Kitty Beckwith
Babysitter	2015	Sadie Castellano	Morgan Krantz	Credited as Kitty Patterson
Baked in Brooklyn	2016	Eliza	Rory Rooney	
