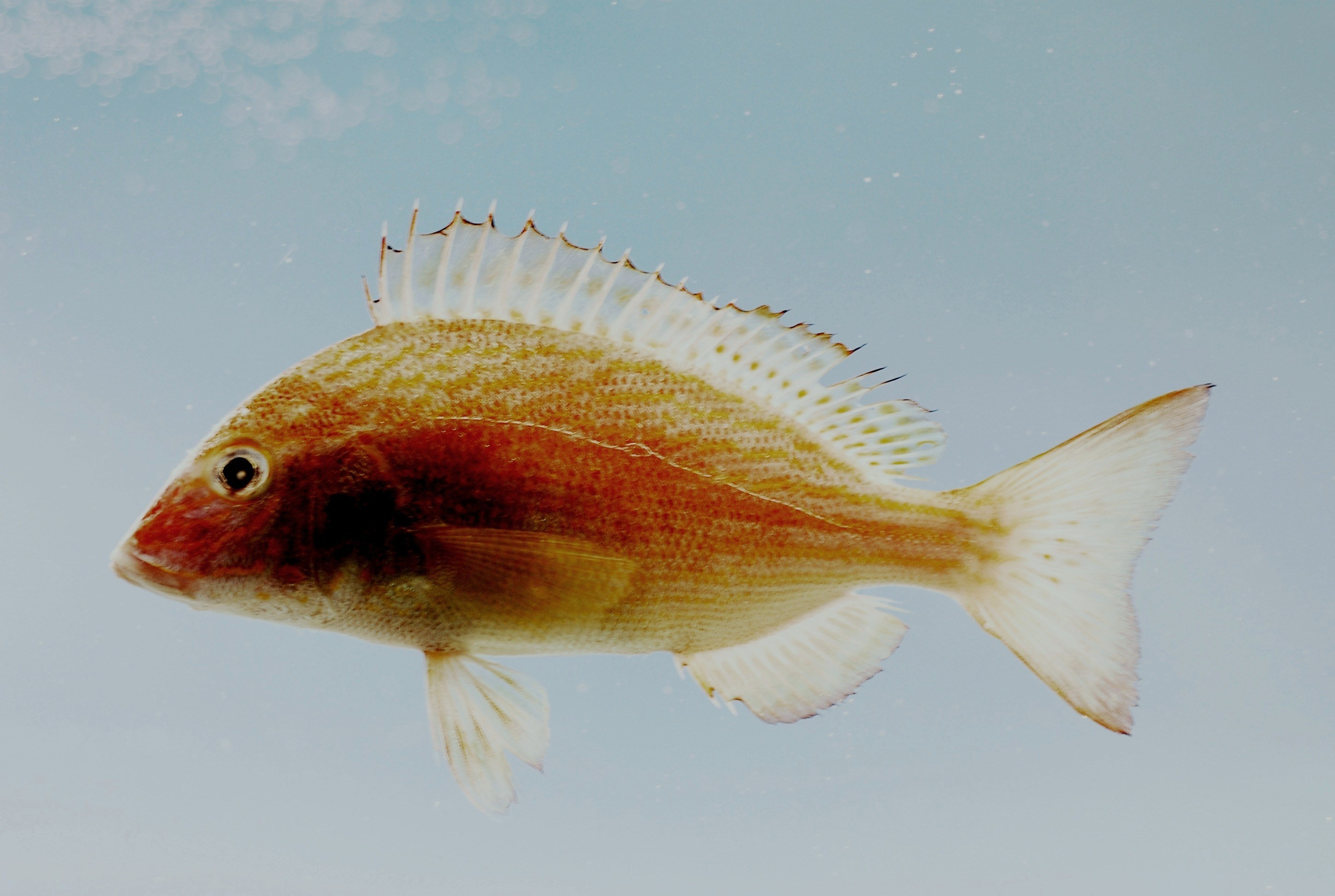

Scientific classification
- Kingdom: Animalia
- Phylum: Chordata
- Class: Actinopterygii
- Division: Teleostei
- Order: Acanthuriformes
- Family: Haemulidae
- Subfamily: Haemulinae
- Genus: Orthopristis; Girard, 1858

Type species
- Orthopristis duplex Girard, 1858

Synonyms
- Evapristis D. S. Jordan & Evermann, 1896; Lepidopristis Fowler, 1944; Lepthaemulon Fowler & B. A. Bean, 1923; Pristocantharus T. N. Gill, 1862; †Allomorone Frizzell and Dante, 1965

= Orthopristis =

Orthopristis Temporal range: Middle Eocene–present

Genus of ray-finned fishes

Orthopristis is a genus of marine ray-finned fish, grunts belonging to family Haemulidae. They are found in the Atlantic and Pacific coasts of the Americas.

== Species ==
The currently recognized species in this genus are:

- Orthopristis cantharinus (Jenyns, 1840) (sheephead grunt)
- Orthopristis chalceus (Günther, 1864) (brassy grunt)
- Orthopristis chrysoptera (Linnaeus, 1766) (pigfish)
- Orthopristis forbesi D. S. Jordan & Starks, 1897
- Orthopristis lethopristis D. S. Jordan & Fesler, 1889 (scalyfin grunt)
- Orthopristis reddingi D. S. Jordan & R. E. Richardson, 1895 (bronze-striped grunt)
- Orthopristis ruber (G. Cuvier, 1830) (corocoro grunt)
- Orthopristis scapularis Fowler, 1915 (South American grunt)

The extinct species O. burlesonis (formerly Allomorone burlesonis Frizzell and Dante, 1965) is known from otoliths from the Middle Eocene of the southern United States. †Orthopristis proronchus Arambourg, 1927 is known from the latest Miocene (Messinian) of Algeria.
