= Black margate =

- In Bonaire

Conservation status
- Data Deficient (IUCN 3.1)

Scientific classification
- Kingdom: Animalia
- Phylum: Chordata
- Class: Actinopterygii
- Division: Teleostei
- Order: Acanthuriformes
- Family: Haemulidae
- Genus: Anisotremus
- Species: A. surinamensis

Binomial name
- Anisotremus surinamensis (Bloch, 1791)

Synonyms
- Lutjanus surinamensis Bloch, 1791

Species of fish

The black margate (Anisotremus surinamensis), also known as black bream, black thicklip, dogfish, lippe, Mexican bull, pompon, Spanish grunt, surf bream, sweetlips, or thicklip grunt, is a species of marine ray-finned fish, a grunt belonging to the family Haemulidae. It is native to the western Atlantic Ocean.

== Taxonomy ==
The black margate was first formally described in 1791 as Lutjanus surinamensis by German naturalist Marcus Elieser Bloch (1723–1799), with the type locality given as Suriname.

== Distribution ==
The black margate is found in the warmer parts of the Western Atlantic Ocean, in Florida from Cape Canaveral south through the Florida Keys to the Gulf of Mexico, including the Flower Garden Banks, from Rockport, Texas, along the coast of Mexico to the northern Yucatan Peninsula and northwestern Cuba. It occurs throughout the Caribbean Sea and along the northern and eastern coasts of South America to Rio de Janeiro in Brazil. It also occurs at the Fernando de Noronha and Trindade Island.

== Description ==
A. surinamensis of varying sizes

The black margate reaches a maximum total length of 76 cm (30 in), although a total length of 45 cm (18 in) is more typical, while the heaviest specimen recorded was 5.8 kg (13 lb).

The black margate has a deep, compressed body with a high back and a short, blunt head. The mouth is positioned low on the head, it is horizontal with fleshy lips and the jaws are equipped with bands of teeth on both jaws. The outer band of teeth is conical in shape. The dorsal fin has 12 spines and 18 soft rays, while the anal fin contains three spines and 9 soft rays. A deep notch is in the dorsal fin and the fourth dorsal spine is longer than the others, while the second anal spine is also very large.

It has a greyish-silver body that is darker on the anterior half than the posterior half. The dorsal scales have black centers and the fins are dark grey, the pelvic and anal fins being the darkest. A darker patch is seen on the rear of the pectoral fins. The juveniles have a black stripe along the lateral line and another along the upper back, with a large black spot on base of tail fin.

== Habitat and biology ==
In Brazil

The black margate shows a preference for steep, sloping rock substrates or rock reefs in inshore waters down to depths of 20 m (66 ft). It frequently takes shelter in caves, ledges, and within wrecks. It is normally encountered either as small groups or individuals. It is a nocturnal feeder; its diet including crustaceans, molluscs, smaller fish, and urchins. A frequent item in its diet are sea urchins in the genus Diadema.

They may gather in spawning aggregations, and off Jamaica, breeding adults have been reported between April and August. Larvae and young juveniles have been observed settling on rocky seabeds off Florida.

== Uses ==
In Florida

The black margate is occasionally caught and marketed by fisheries, although the consumption of the flesh of larger fishes has been linked to cases of ciguatera poisoning. It is also found in the aquarium trade.
