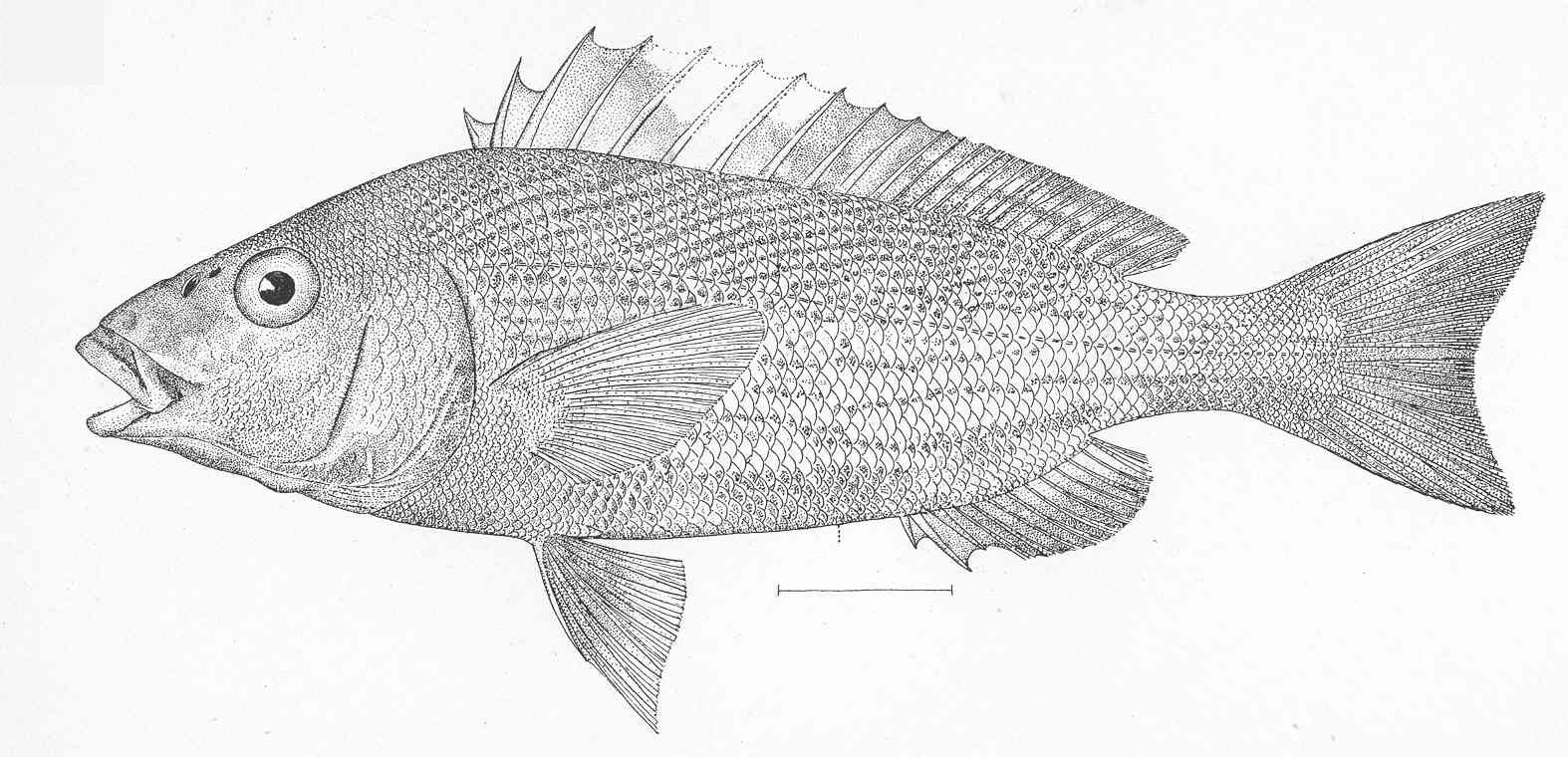

Conservation status
- Least Concern (IUCN 3.1)

Scientific classification
- Kingdom: Animalia
- Phylum: Chordata
- Class: Actinopterygii
- Order: Acanthuriformes
- Family: Haemulidae
- Genus: Orthopristis
- Species: O. reddingi

Binomial name
- Orthopristis reddingi D. S. Jordan & R. E. Richardson, 1895

= Orthopristis reddingi =

Species of fish

Orthopristis reddingi, the bronze-striped grunt, is a species of ray-finned fish, a grunt belonging to the family Haemulidae. It is endemic to Mexico, occurring from central Baja California, including the southern Sea of Cortez, to central Mexico. It is found in schools over sandy substrates in coastal waters and the juveniles are frequently recorded in tidal pools. They are found at depths between 5 and 30 m (16 and 98 ft). This species was first formally described in 1895 by the American ichthyologists David Starr Jordan and Robert Earl Richardson, the type locality was given as La Paz, Baja California Sur. The specific name honours in Benjamin B. Redding (1824-1882), the politician who was the first Fish Commissioner of California.

Orthopristis reddingi has a body which is elongated and slender, as well as being laterally compressed. The overall colour is silvery with orange or bronze diagonal stripes matching the orientation over of the scale rows. The fins, other than the dusky caudal fin, are transparent. They have a short mouth that does not extend to the eyes. They have a continuous dorsal fin with 12 spines and 15 soft rays and there are 3 short spines in the anal fin, with the second spine being longer than the third, and 9 or 10 soft rays. The caudal fin is deeply forked. This species attains a maximum total length of 30 cm (12 in).

Although their biology is little known, it is accepted that they are night-feeding carnivores, preying on benthic crustaceans, echinoderms, small fish and molluscs. It is an oviparous species which forms distinct pairs for spawning.
