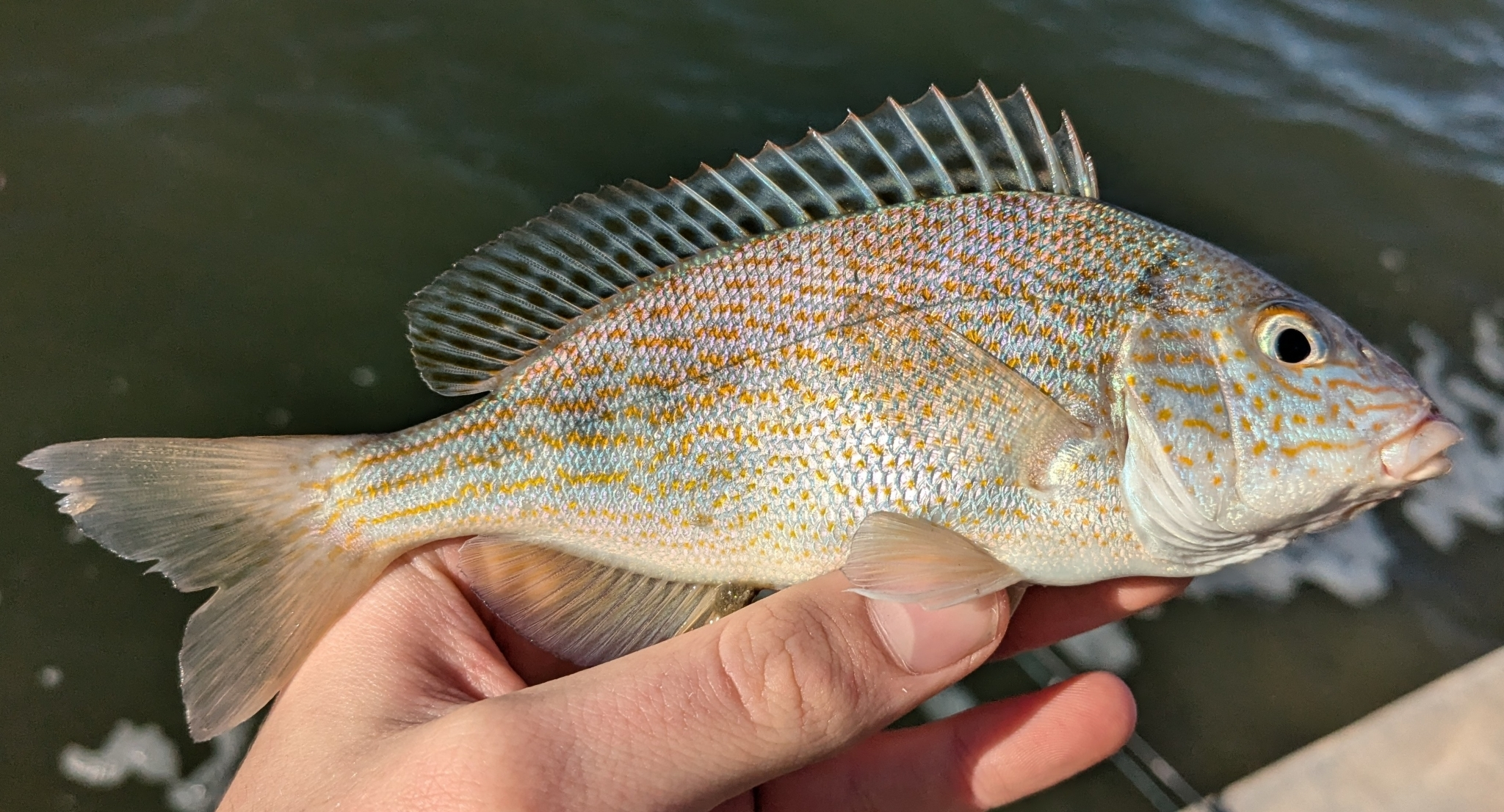

Conservation status
- Least Concern (IUCN 3.1)

Scientific classification
- Kingdom: Animalia
- Phylum: Chordata
- Class: Actinopterygii
- Division: Teleostei
- Order: Acanthuriformes
- Family: Haemulidae
- Genus: Orthopristis
- Species: O. chrysoptera

Binomial name
- Orthopristis chrysoptera (Linnaeus, 1766)

Synonyms
- List: Perca chrysoptera Linnaeus, 1766; Haemulon chrysopterum (Linnaeus, 1766); Labrus fulvomaculatus Mitchill, 1815; Orthopristis fulvomaculatus (Mitchill, 1815); Pomadasys fulvomaculatus (Mitchill, 1815); Pristipoma fulvomaculatum (Mitchill, 1815); Pristipoma fasciatum Cuvier, 1830; Orthopristis duplex Girard, 1858; Orthopristis poeyi Scudder, 1868

= Orthopristis chrysoptera =

Species of fish

Orthopristis chrysoptera, the pigfish, hogfish, piggy perch, redmouth grunt or sailor's choice, is a species of marine ray-finned fish, a grunt belonging to the family Haemulidae. It is found in the western Atlantic Ocean. This name derives from the grunting or chattering noise these fish make by rubbing their pharyngeal teeth together.

== Taxonomy ==
Orthopristis chrysoptera was first formally described as Perca chrysoptera in 1758 by Carolus Linnaeus with the type locality given as Carolina. It is now thought this means the Bahamas or South Carolina. When Charles Frédéric Gerard described Orthopristis duplex in 1858 he placed it in a new genus. This taxon was later shown to be a junior synonym of Linnaeus's P. chrysoptera, so this species is the type species of the genus Orthopristis. The specific name chrysoptera means "golden-finned." Linnaeus did not explain this, but it may refer to the row of bronze spots on the dorsal fin or the yellowish paired fins.

== Distribution ==
Orthopristis chrysoptera is found in the western Atlantic Ocean along the east coast of the United States and Mexico. Its range extends from Massachusetts to Florida and into the Gulf of Mexico, including the Yucatan Peninsula and Cuba. It is also found in Bermuda. A single specimen was reported off the coast of southern Sicily in 2020, likely after being transported accidentally by a ship.

== Description ==
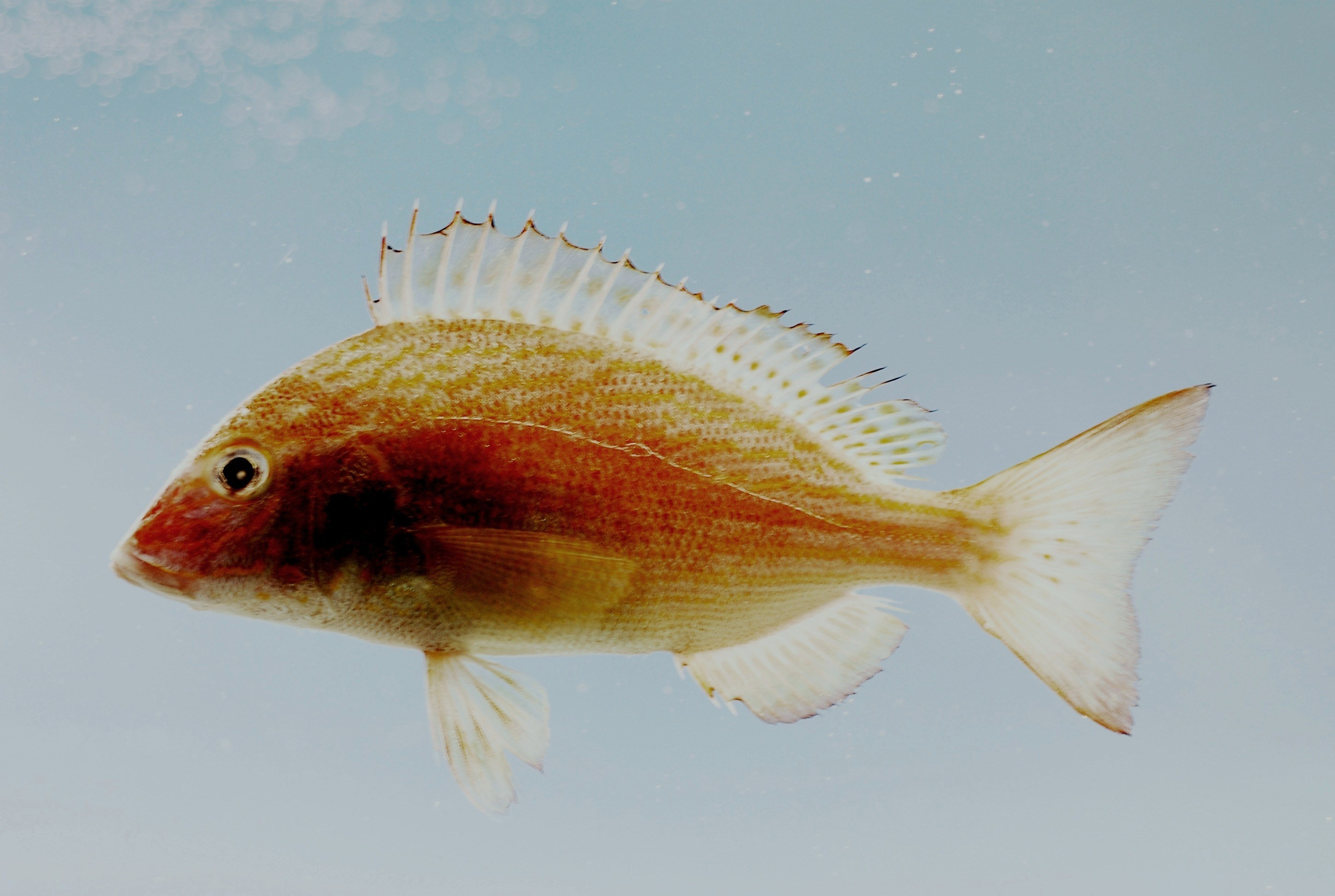
From the Gulf of Mexico

Orthopristis chrysoptera attains a maximum total length of 46 cm (18 in), although 30 cm (12 in) is more typical, and the maximum recorded weight is 900 g (32 oz).

This species has an elliptical, oval shaped, compressed body with a thin-lipped small mouth which does not extend to the eye and is not coloured red inside. The jaws have a narrow band of thin teeth. The dorsal fin contains 12–13 spines and a similar number of soft rays while the anal fin has 3 spines and 12–13 soft rays, the second spine is slightly thicker and longer than the third. The entire body is covered in scales apart from the tip of the snout, lips and chin.

The Pigfish is pale bluish-grey on its back and silvery on its underside. Every scale on its body has a blue center and a bronze spot on the margin, creating diagonal orange-brown stripes running up an along the flanks and back. The stripes below the lateral line are horizontal. There are bronze spots on the head and the fins are a yellowish- bronze with dusky margins.

== Habitat ==
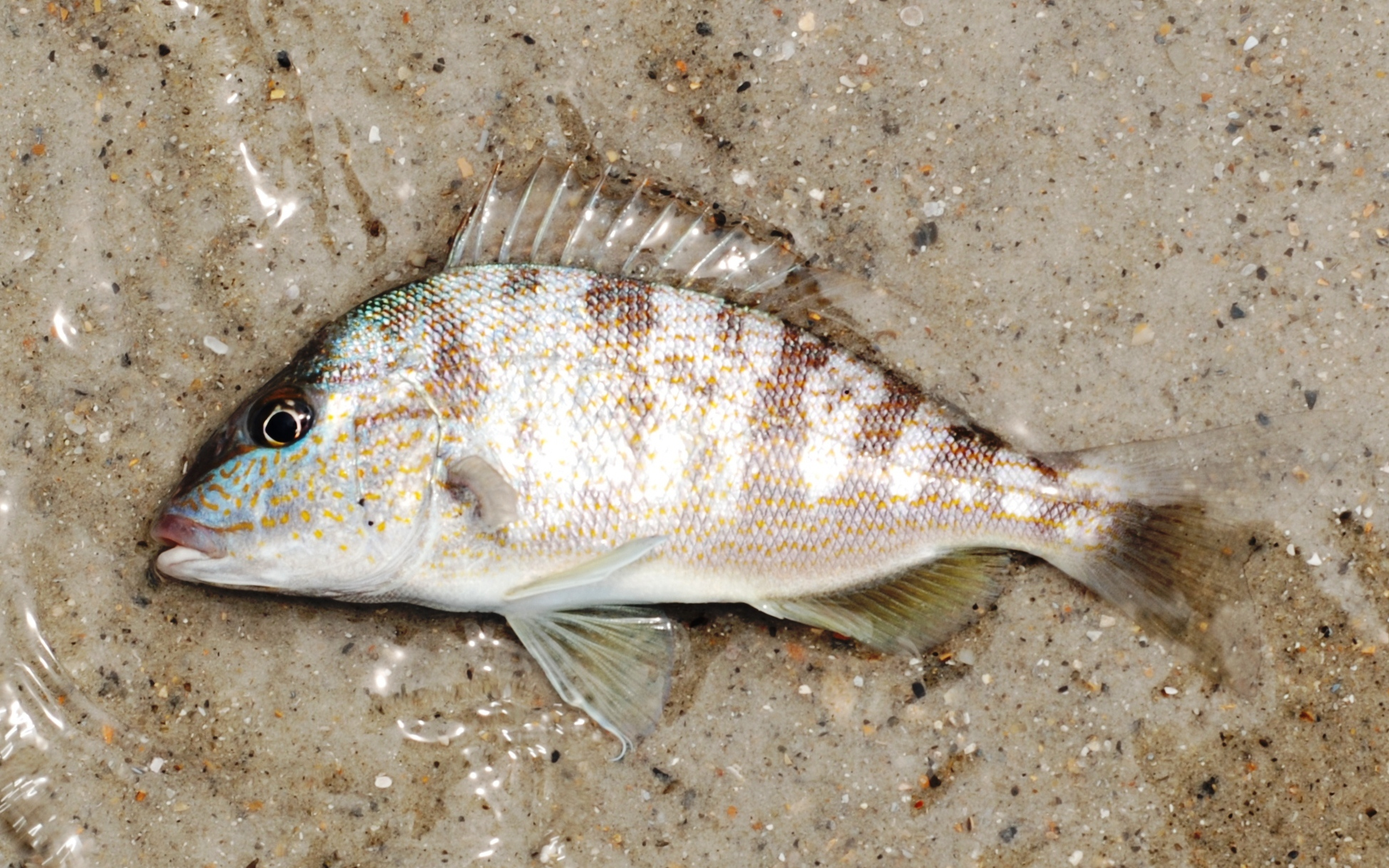
In North Carolina

Orthopristis chrysoptera are found at depths between 1 and 20 m (0 and 70 ft), where they can be found in estuaries and bays, sometimes entering canals, but seldom waters of very low salinity. Within these shallow waters they inhabit a range of habitats, residing over soft substrates such as sand or silt, hard substrates including jetties, reefs and oil rigs, as well as shell banks. They may be found both in coastal waters and over the continental shelf.

== Biology ==
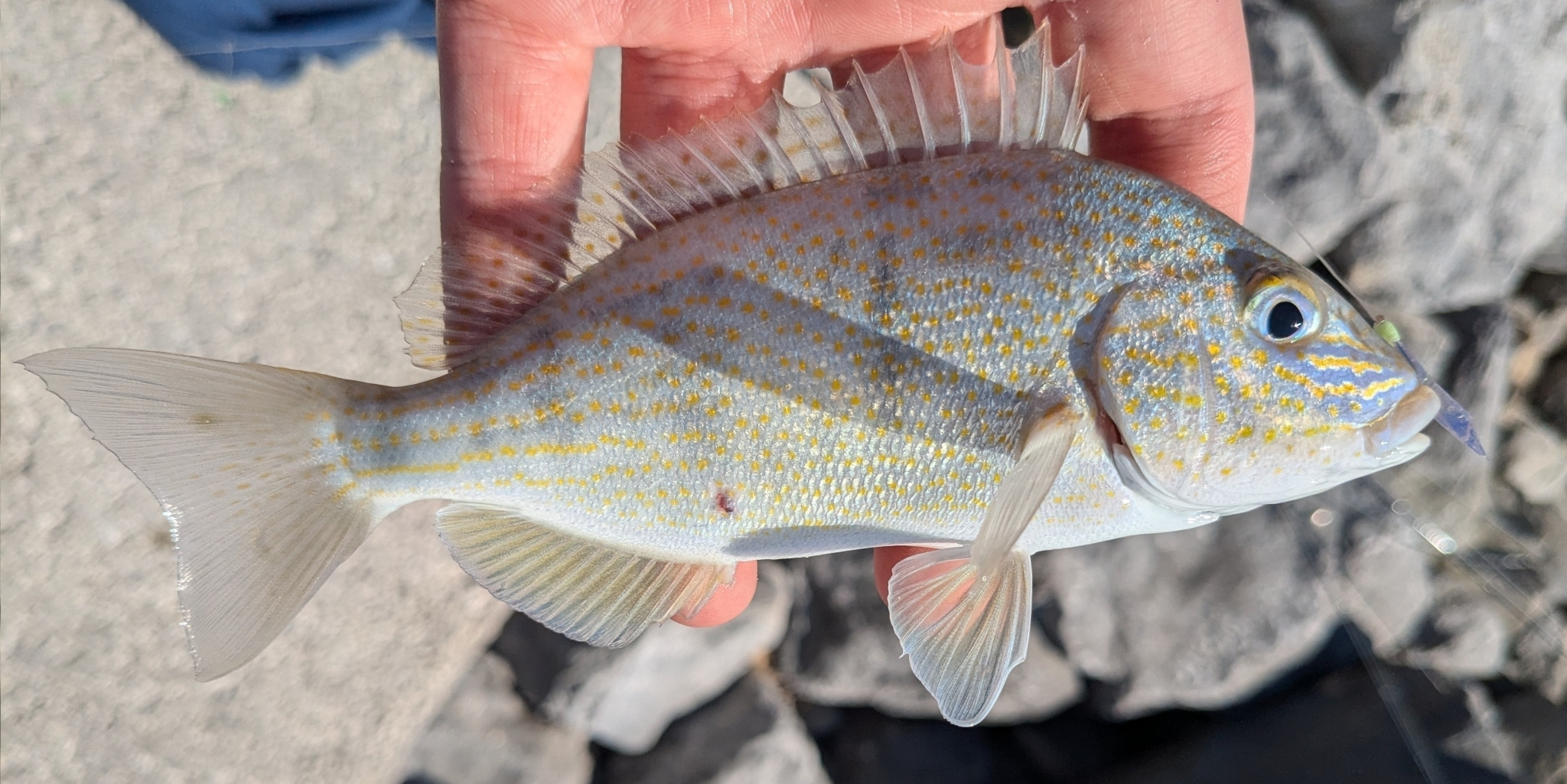
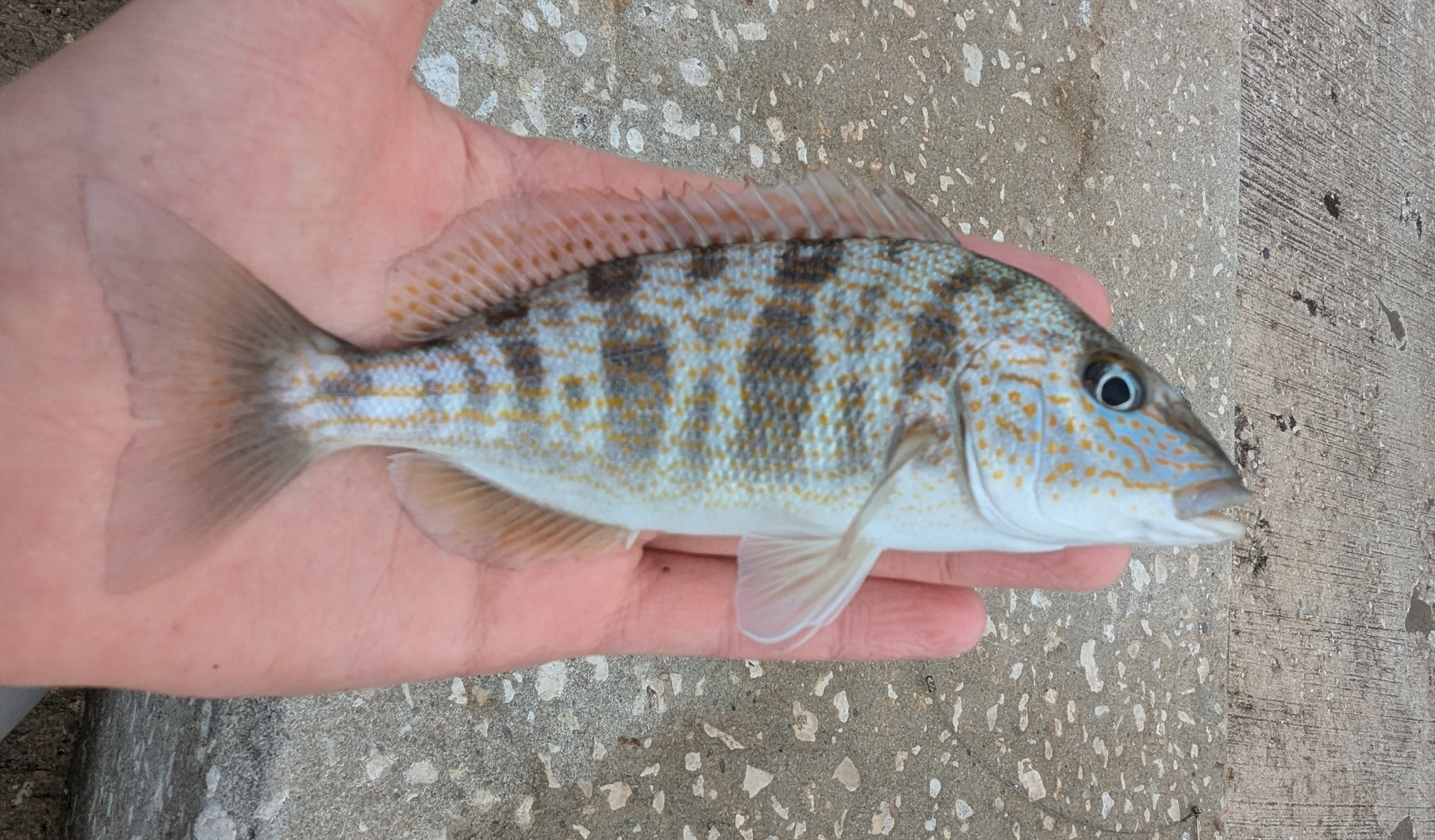
In Florida

The main spawning season occurs during the Spring, starting in late winter. Spawning takes place at dusk, and may occur offshore in open waters or in more sheltered situations inshore. The larger fish typically spawn earlier in the season. All fish lose condition over this spawning season. The eggs and larvae are pelagic. Eggs hatch after only 48 hours into larvae, which become juveniles at approximately 7 cm (2.8 in) in length. The maximum reported age of the Pigfish is 4 years, but most only live to 3 years of age.

Pigfish are predatory fish, emerging from shelters to feed at night. Their main prey is benthic invertebrates. As with many species of predatory fish, prey size increases with the size of the fish. Younger fish typically feed on planktonic crustaceans while larger fish feed on polychaetes, larger crustaceans, molluscs and smaller fish. They have even been recorded eating insect larvae in brackish waters. Pigfish are a migratory species and thus move offshore during the winter to reside in warmer, deeper water. When they return inshore in the Springtime they are often found in poor condition, suggesting that the offshore food supply is of low quality. They also undertake shorter distance migrations to and from feeding areas and shelters on a daily basis.

The pigfish likely gets its name from the chattering noises they create when they are captured. The pigfish creates this grunting noise by rubbing its pharyngeal teeth together, in the same manner as the other grunt species. When feeding, pigfish use these teeth to grind up shellfish and small bits of other food.

== Utilisation ==
Orthopristis chrysoptera is caught using hook and line, traps and seines. The catch is not recorded separately for this species. The flesh is normally sold fresh. It is often caught to be used as bait in angling and commercial fisheries for other, larger fish such as the spotted sea trout (Cynoscion nebulosus).
