= RV Manta =

NOAA research vessel

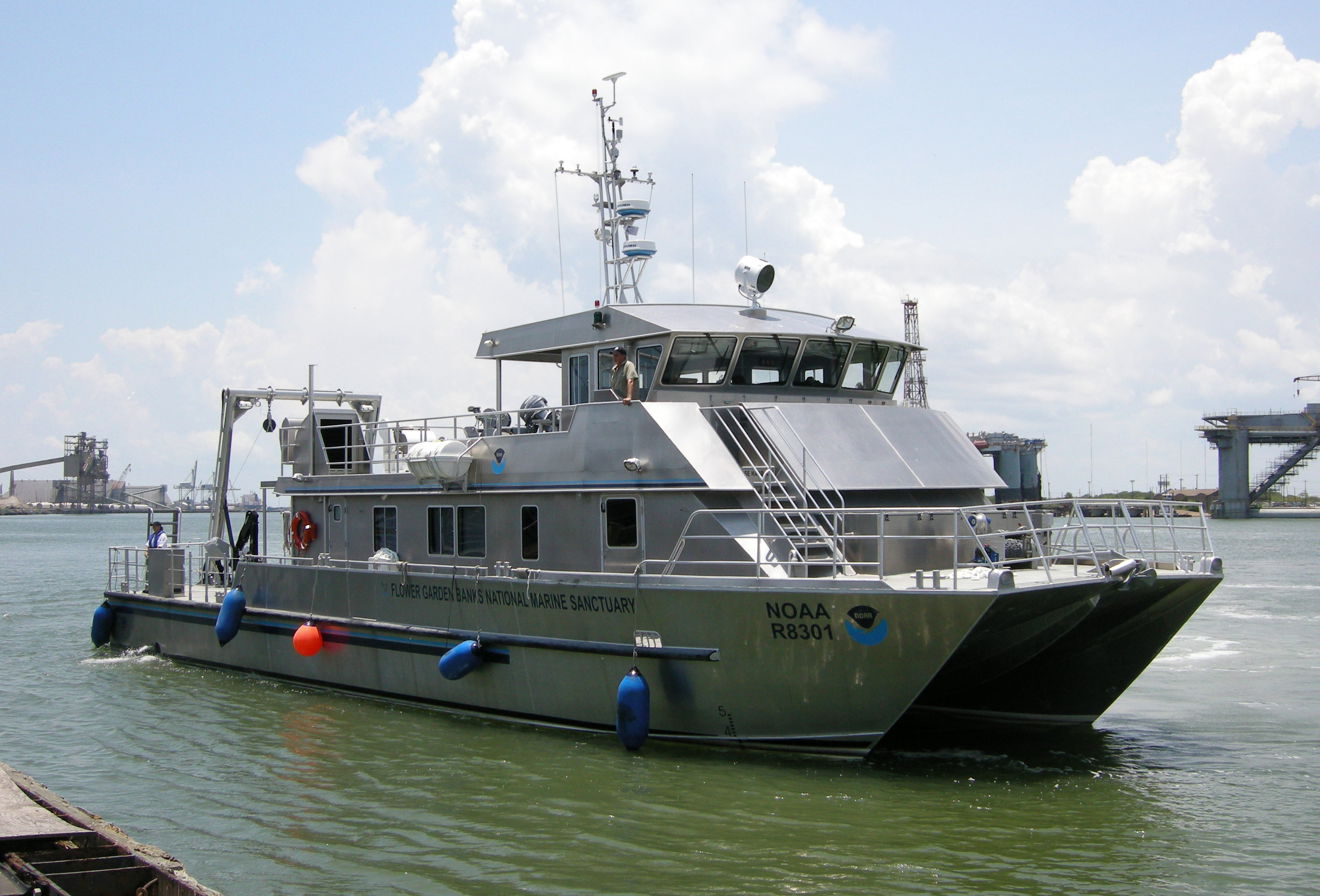

History

United States
- Name: Manta
- Port of registry: Galveston, Texas
- Ordered: 2004
- Builder: All American Marine
- Laid down: May 2007
- Launched: 15 January 2008
- Identification: MMSI number: 368926309; Call Sign: WZ2603

General characteristics
- Type: Small research vessel
- Length: 30 m (98 ft 5 in)
- Beam: 12 m (39 ft 4 in)
- Draft: 1.5 m (4 ft 11 in)
- Speed: 10.8 kn

RV Manta is an American research vessel that is in service with the National Oceanic and Atmospheric Administration as the primary maritime vessel of the Flower Garden Banks National Marine Sanctuary.

== Description ==
Manta is a catamaran ship with twin aluminum hulls and an overall length of roughly 30 m (98 ft). It has a width of 9 m (30 ft), a draft of 1.5 m (4.9 ft), and displaces 78.5 tons. The ship is designed to have the space and equipment for up to twenty divers, including a recompression chamber and three dive showers. On board is a single Polaris RHIB and two lifeboats. The ship has a crew of 14 and can accommodate up to 25 passengers.

Manta is propelled by two Caterpillar diesel engines which each provide 1,600 horsepower for an average speed of 10.8 knots and a maximum range of 650 nautical miles.

== History ==
The NOAA ordered a new small research vessel in 2004, with Teknicraft of New Zealand designing the ship. In May 2007, All American Marine began construction of the ship in Washington state, and launched the vessel on 15 January 2008. Following sea trials, the ship was christened Manta in Galveston, Texas, on 27 June 2008.

Beginning in June 2008, Manta was the research and monitoring vessel of the Flower Garden Banks National Maritime Sanctuary in the Northwestern Gulf of Mexico. The ship also acts as a host for educational trips and is a standby vessel for emergency response.
