= Am I Happy, Singing =

Studio album by Ricky Eat Acid
- Released: April 20, 2018
- Genre: Glitch; ambient; drone; classical; indietronica
- Length: 30:48
- Label: Self-released
- Producer: Sam Ray

Ricky Eat Acid chronology
Talk to You Soon (2016)	Am I Happy, Singing (2018)	When They Align Just So, Memories of Another Life Bleed into My Own (2020)

Am I Happy, Singing (stylized as Am I Happy, Singing_) is the sixth studio album by American ambient musician, Ricky Eat Acid. The album was self-released in 2016 before being released officially on April 20, 2018. It was written and recorded in a couple of days during the summer of 2014, after the release of Three Love Songs and it was shelved in order to accommodate Ray's other releases scheduled for that year.

== Critical reception ==
Professional ratings
Review scores
Source	Rating
Pitchfork	7.9/10

Madison Bloom, writing for Pitchfork gave the album a 7.9 out of 10 saying the album "requires absolute stillness. It’s too jarring to score mundane activities, and too interesting to be relegated to playlists like “Hanging Out and Relaxing” or “Wine & Dine.” “two_beautiful ways of moving_your_hands” may be fabricated with gorgeous strings, but their incomplete, looped phrases arouse an intense yearning for them to fully bloom. It is a sensation I can only liken to the blushing tension between a “good night” and a first kiss. The anticipation escalates when the audio cuts out for a full four seconds, an eternity in song time. As a listener, you are hanging on every note, or lack thereof."

== Track listing ==
All music is composed by Sam Ray.

No.	Title	Length
1.	"Sitting in a Diner"	7:09
2.	"Two Beautiful Ways of Moving Your Hands"	6:29
3.	"Am I Happy Singing"	17:10
Total length:		30:48
