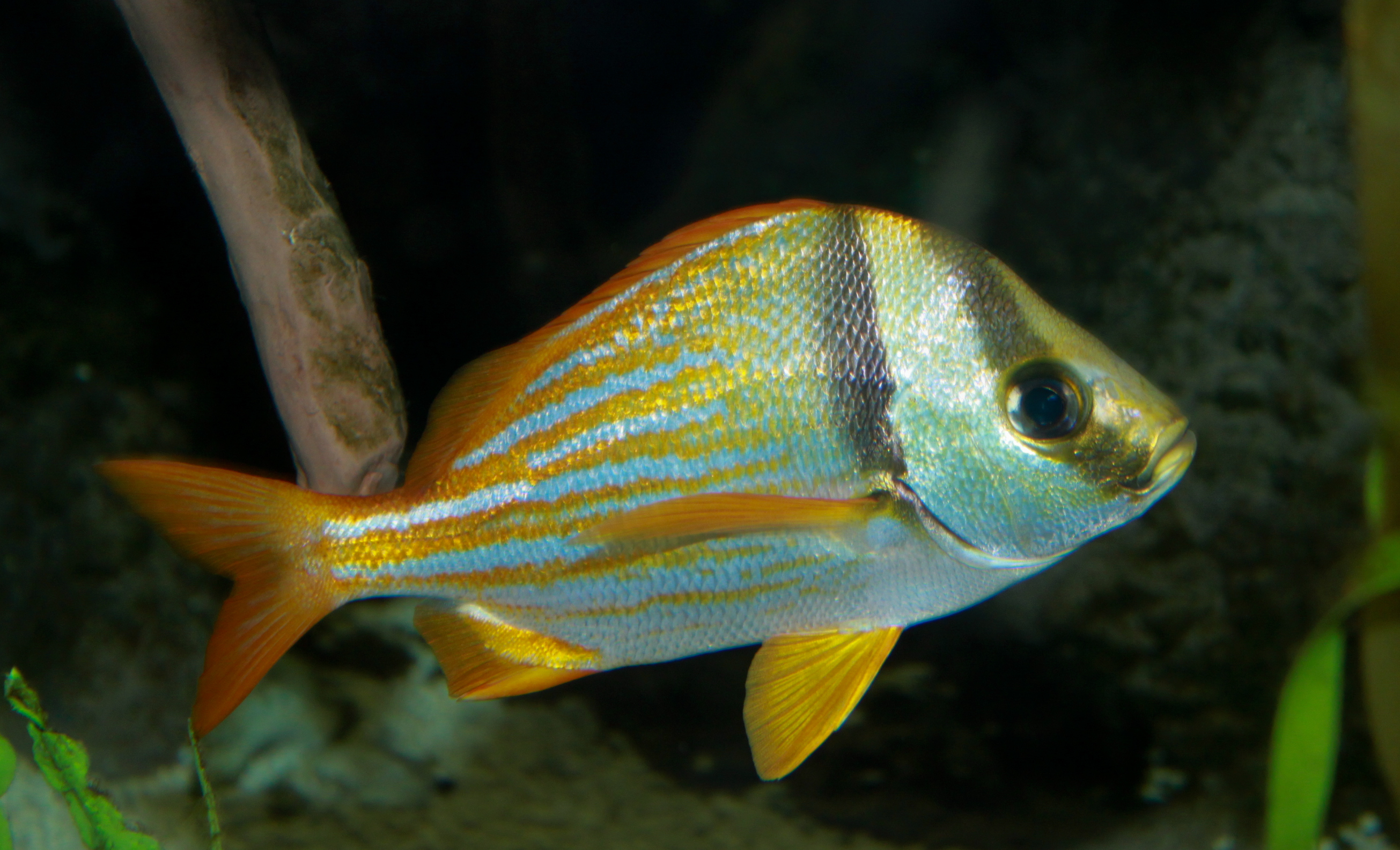
- Anisotremus virginicus

Scientific classification
- Kingdom: Animalia
- Phylum: Chordata
- Class: Actinopterygii
- Division: Teleostei
- Order: Acanthuriformes
- Family: Haemulidae
- Subfamily: Haemulinae
- Genus: Anisotremus; T. N. Gill, 1861

Type species
- Sparus virginicus Linnaeus, 1758

Synonyms
- Genytremus T. N. Gill, 1862

= Anisotremus =

Genus of ray-finned fishes

Anisotremus is a genus of grunts native to the eastern Pacific and western Atlantic Oceans. The name of this genus is compound of anisto meaning “different” and tremus meaning “hole”, referring to the differently sized, paired pores on each side of the head.

== Species ==
The currently recognized species in this genus are:

Image	Species	Common name
	Anisotremus caesius (D. S. Jordan & C. H. Gilbert, 1882)	silvergrey grunt
	Anisotremus davidsonii (Steindachner, 1876)	xantic sargo
	Anisotremus espinozai Acevedo-Álvarez, Ruiz-Campos & Domínguez-Domínguez 2021	Santa Cruz grunt
	Anisotremus interruptus (T. N. Gill, 1862)	burrito grunt
	Anisotremus perezponcedeleoni Acevedo-Álvarez, Ruiz-Campos & Domínguez-Domínguez 2021	clarion grunt
	Anisotremus scapularis (Tschudi, 1846)	Peruvian grunt
	Anisotremus surinamensis (Bloch, 1791)	black margate
	Anisotremus taeniatus T. N. Gill, 1861	Panama porkfish
	Anisotremus virginicus (Linnaeus, 1758)	porkfish
