= Teen Suicide (band) =

American indie rock band

- Origin: Baltimore, Maryland, U.S.
- Genres: Indie rock; noise pop; emo; experimental pop; shoegaze; lo-fi; dream pop
- Years active: 2009–present
- Label: Run for Cover
- Spinoffs: The Pom-Poms
- Members: Sam Ray; Kitty Pryde
- Past members: Eric Livingston; Caroline White; John Toohey; Brian Sumner; Alec Simke; Sean Mercer
- Website: teensuicide.bandcamp.com

Teen Suicide is an American indie rock band formed in 2009 in Baltimore, Maryland. The project originally was a solo project of Sam Ray (lead vocals and guitar) but was later joined by many people, most recently Kitty Pryde (keyboards and vocals).

== History ==
Teen Suicide formed as a solo project of Sam Ray in 2009 and released a 2011 compilation, Bad Vibes Forever, which consisted of "early early demos". Soon after this, Eric Livingston joined the band, making a duo with Ray on vocals, guitar, synthesizers, drum machines, and bass, and Livingston on drums and vocals, occasionally accompanied by various unofficial members such as Alec Simke and Caroline White.

In February of the following year, they released an EP titled DC Snuff Film. They followed up that EP with a three-song EP titled Goblin Problems in June 2012. A full-length album entitled Waste Yrself was also being produced around the same time, but it was left uncompleted. Instead, the tracks intended for release on the album were included as part of the compilation Rarities, Unreleased Stuff, and Cool Things, then released separately shortly afterward. In September 2012, Teen Suicide released their debut full-length album, I Will Be My Own Hell Because There Is a Devil Inside My Body. Around this time, Alec Simke became a full-fledged member of the band. In November 2012, Teen Suicide released another EP, Hymns, prior to announcing they were breaking up. They played two more shows in December 2012 and January 2013, then disbanded.

In February 2013, the band released a compilation on Bandcamp titled Rarities, Unreleased Stuff, and Cool Things. On the December 27 date of Elvis Depressedly and Crying's tour, the band reformed "on a whim" to play a secret set at the Charm City Art Space in Baltimore. They subsequently reunited to play four reunion shows from February 27 to March 2 with Special Explosion and Sorority Noise, now with a lineup featuring Ray, Simke, John Toohey on guitar, and Brian Sumner on drums.

A new Teen Suicide song titled "Pavement" was featured on the Topshelf Records 2014 digital label sampler. In January 2015, the band signed to Run for Cover Records to release remastered and expanded editions of I Will Be My Own Hell Because There Is a Devil Inside My Body, DC Snuff Film and Waste Yrself, with the two latter records being released as a single album.

In April 2015, the track "no, the moon" by Teen Suicide was sampled in a beat by producer Willie G, which was then used for XXXTentacion's "Teeth (Interlude)" in his scrapped EP Heartbreak Hotel.

Teen Suicide contributed a new song to Paper Trail Records' Thanks for Listening compilation. From December 2015 to January 2016, several demos appeared on the band's social media prior to the announcement of their second album, It's the Big Joyous Celebration, Let's Stir the Honeypot, which came out April 1. Teen Suicide has since toured three times: in 2016 with Say Anything, mewithoutYou, and Museum Mouth; a summer tour also in 2016 with Elvis Depressedly and Nicole Dollanganger; and in 2025 with Itoldyouiwouldeatyou.

== Members ==
Current

- Sam Ray – guitar, lead vocals (2009–present)
- Kitty Ray – keyboards, vocals (2018–present)

Former

- Eric Livingston – drums (2011–2013)
- Caroline White – viola, backing vocals (2012–2013)
- Alec Simke – bass (2012–2016), guitar (2012)
- Brian Sumner – drums (2013–2014)
- John Toohey – guitar, backing vocals (2013–2016)
- Sean Mercer – drums (2014–2016)

== Discography ==
=== Studio albums ===
- I Will Be My Own Hell Because There Is a Devil Inside My Body (2012)
- It's the Big Joyous Celebration, Let's Stir the Honeypot (2016)
- Honeybee Table at the Butterfly Feast (2022)
- Nude Descending Staircase Headless (2026)

=== Compilation albums ===
- Bad Vibes Forever (2011)
- DC Snuff Film / Waste Yrself (2015)
- Rarities, B-Sides, Demos, Outtakes, & Secret Songs... 2009-2019 (2019)

=== Mixtapes ===
- Rarities, Unreleased Stuff, and Cool Things (2013)

=== Extended plays ===
- DC Snuff Film (2012)
- Goblin Problems (2012)
- Waste Yrself (2012)
- Hymns (2012)
- Bonus EP (2016)

=== Singles ===
- "Sonic Youth" (2015)
- "Fade 2 Blue" b/w "New Tattoo" (2025)
