= Burrito grunt =

Conservation status
- Least Concern (IUCN 3.1)

Scientific classification
- Kingdom: Animalia
- Phylum: Chordata
- Class: Actinopterygii
- Division: Teleostei
- Order: Acanthuriformes
- Family: Haemulidae
- Genus: Anisotremus
- Species: A. interruptus

Binomial name
- Anisotremus interruptus (T. N. Gill, 1862)

Synonyms
- Genytremus interruptus T. N. Gill, 1862

Species of fish

The burrito grunt (Anisotremus interruptus) is a species of marine ray-finned fish, a grunt belonging to the family Haemulidae. It is native to the tropical waters of the eastern Pacific Ocean area.

== Description ==
The burrito grunt has a deep, compressed body with a high back. The head is short and blunt with a small, low, horizontal mouth which has fleshy lips and jaws which are equipped with bands of teeth. The outer band of teeth are conical in shape. The back is silvery, yellowish brown fading to cream or white in the underparts. The scales on the flanks have dark centres creating a spotted effect with yellowish fins. The dorsal fin is continuous but has a deep notch. The dorsal fin has 12-13 spines, the fourth being longer than the rest, and 16-17 rays while the anal fin contains 3 spines, with the second being notably robust and long, and 8-9 soft rays. The pectoral fins are long, extending to the origin of the anal fins. The caudal fin is forked. This species attains a maximum total length of 51 cm (20 in), although 30 cm (12 in) is more common. The largest weight recorded is 4.53 kg (10.0 lb).

== Distribution ==
The burrito grunt is found in the eastern Pacific Oceans from central Baja and the Gulf of California to Peru and the Galapagos Islands, Cocos Island, Malpelo Island and the Revillagigedo Islands, it is, however, absent from Clipperton Island.

== Habitat and biology ==
The burrito grunt can be found at depths of 3 to 30 m (9.8 to 98.4 ft) (usually not below 12 m (39 ft)) on reefs, shoals spend the day hiding in crevices or caves during coming out at night to feed. it feeds largely on benthic invertebrates.

== Systematics ==
The burrito grunt was first formally described in 1862 as Genytremus interruptus by the American ichthyologist Theodore Nicholas Gill (1837-1914) with the type locality given as Baja California. The specific name interruptus means "broken", a reference to the broken line on the flanks of juveniles.

== Utilisation ==
The burrito grunt is not abundant enough to be a target of commercial fisheries but when it is caught its flesh is said to palatable.
