= D.A.I.S.Y. Rage =

EP by Kitty
- Released: January 30, 2013
- Genre: Cloud rap
- Length: 22:46
- Label: Self-released
- Producers: Grant; Hot Sugar; Water; Sela; Bad Channels; Mike Finito

Kitty chronology
Haha, I'm Sorry (2012)	D.A.I.S.Y. Rage (2013)	Impatiens (2014)

Singles from D.A.I.S.Y. Rage
- 1. "Hittin Lixxx" Released: August 1, 2012; 2. "Ay Shawty 3.0" Released: June 18, 2013

D.A.I.S.Y. Rage is the second extended play by American recording artist Kitty. It was released on January 30, 2013.

== Background and release ==
About the release of the EP, Kitty said: "I exist in the real world now. It's going to be nice because people won't be able to just say that I'm a meme anymore." The title of the EP is a reference to the song ""D.A.I.S.Y. Age" from the De La Soul album 3 Feet High and Rising (1989).

== Composition ==
D.A.I.S.Y. Rage is a cloud rap EP. The EP's lyrical themes have been described as "teenage girl problems".

"Dead Island" uses the dancehall beat from "Pon De Floor" by Major Lazer.

== Critical reception ==
Professional ratings
Aggregate scores
Source	Rating
Metacritic	78/100
Review scores
Source	Rating
Robert Christgau	A−
Consequence of Sound	C+
No Ripcord	6/10
Pitchfork	6.9/10
Rolling Stone	4/5 stars
Tiny Mix Tapes	4.5/5

D.A.I.S.Y. Rage received generally positive reviews from music critics. At Metacritic, which assigns a weighted mean rating out of 100 to reviews from mainstream critics, the album received an average score of 78, based on five reviews, which indicates "generally favorable reviews". Jon Hadusek of Consequence of Sound described Kitty's rhyme schemes as "bizarre", and the beats as "simple and unobtrusive." In his opinion, the three last tracks of the extended play ("Scout Finch Bitch", "R.R.E.A.M.", and "Hittin Lixxx") were weaker than the other tracks because Kitty seemed to be "playing it safe", writing them. Richard Petty of No Ripcord described the opening track of the extended play as "Balam Acab-like aqueous soundscapes", combined with "whimsical Disney reminiscent samples". Petty called "Dead Island" the highlight of the EP, complimenting the "blissful and hazy production, backed by the propulsive dancehall beats of Major Lazer’s Pon De Floor". He criticized Antwon's guest appearance, saying "his relatively gruff voice [contrasts] harshly with Kitty’s hushed vocals and [provides] something of a shock to the system over sliced up DSOTM-era Pink Floyd samples". Petty called "R.R.E.A.M.", "a pastiche of the Wu Tang classic", the hardest song to listen to because of the "glitchy synths" which "[seemed] to [be recreating] motion sickness" but complimented Kitty's "[clever] mining [of] her innocent and relatively youthful age for comedic effect", singing about antihistamines for their intended use instead of recreational use with codeine.

Carrie Battan of Pitchfork noted that D.A.I.S.Y. Rage "[feeds] on warm, sparkly beats and topical rap nerdery asserted with a defiantly Disney Channel attitude", just like Kitty's previous EP, Haha, I'm Sorry (2012). Battan compared Kitty's attitude in the song "$krillionaire" to that of Holden Caulfield from J. D. Salinger's The Catcher in the Rye (1951), citing the line "I hate everyone that wants to be a millionaire / So freakin' bad / So freakin' bad" as an example. She also pointed out that the song "No Offense!!!!!" might be about Kitty's friend, Danny Brown", citing the line "You're about as fraudulent as a mirage out in the desert / Blue peacock / You're puffing out your feathers / To bring a bunch of bitches backstage into your dressing room / So you could treat it like a petting zoo" as support of that suggestion. Battan also described Kitty's voice as "still saccharine, her tone precious to the point of sounding infantile". Jody Rosen of Rolling Stone compared the "emotional truth" in Kitty's love songs to that of Taylor Swift and described her flow as "fleet and inventive".

== Track listing ==
Digital download
No.	Title	Writer(s)	Producer(s)	Length
1.	"UNfollowed."	Kathryn Beckwith	Sela	2:26
2.	"☠DEAD❤ISLAND☠"	Beckwith	Water	2:19
3.	"Ay Shawty 3.0" (featuring Lakutis)	Beckwith; Aleksey Weintraub	Hot Sugar	3:00
4.	"$krillionaire"	Beckwith	Mike Finito	4:06
5.	"No Offense!!!!!"	Beckwith	Grant	2:49
6.	"Scout Finch Bitch" (featuring Antwon)	Beckwith; Antonio Williams	Grant	2:32
7.	"R.R.E.A.M."	Beckwith	Grant	2:54
8.	"Hittin Lixxx"	Beckwith	Bad Channels	2:40
Total length:				22:46

== Personnel ==
- Credits adapted from Bandcamp.

Performance

- Kitty - primary artist
- Lakutis - featured artist
- Antwon - featured artist

Technical

- Grant - producer
- Water - producer
- Hot Sugar - producer
- Sela - producer
- Bad Channels - producer
- Mike Finito - producer
- Jake Aron - mixing, mastering
