= Haha, I'm Sorry =

EP by Kitty
- Released: June 11, 2012
- Genre: Cloud rap
- Length: 12:41
- Label: Self-released
- Producers: Beautiful Lou; Sela; Grant

Kitty chronology
The Lizzie McGuire Experience (2011)	Haha, I'm Sorry (2012)	D.A.I.S.Y. Rage (2013)

Singles from Haha, I'm Sorry
- 1. "Okay Cupid" Released: April 11, 2012

Haha, I'm Sorry is the first extended play by American recording artist Kitty. It was released on June 11, 2012, under the name Kitty Pryde.

== Promotion ==
The first and only single of Haha, I'm Sorry, "Okay Cupid", was released as a digital download on April 11, 2012. On May 9, Kitty released the music video for "Okay Cupid", directed by Bryan McKay and Shannen Ortale, on YouTube. The video became a viral success, having been viewed over one million times as of April 2014. The music video garnered attention from various online music publications, including Complex, The Fader, Rolling Stone, and The New York Times.

== Critical reception ==
Professional ratings
Review scores
Source	Rating
Beats Per Minute	69%
Pitchfork	6/10
Rolling Stone	3.5/5 stars

Haha, I'm Sorry received generally positive reviews from music critics. Craig Jenkins of Beats Per Minute compared Kitty's confessional lyricism to "social media oversharing," and said the extended play "aptly conveys the shock of a life thrown jarringly off its track where our subject inexplicably finds herself hobnobbing with people she’d only ever read about." Jenkins complimented Beautiful Lou's production, comparing it to that of Clams Casino, described Kitty's vocals as breathy and said the tracks “Smiledog.jpg” and “Okay Cupid” had a dreamlike quality. He also complimented Riff Raff's guest appearance and Kitty's "double-time flow" on the Carly Rae Jepsen redux, "Give Me Scabies". Lindsay Zoladz of Pitchfork described Kitty's flow on the EP as "creaky-voiced" and said Pryde's music "captures something human and disarmingly honest about longing in the hyper-connected disconnect of the digital world." Zoladz criticized the track "Smiledog.jpg", describing it as "a missed opportunity to do something more than just show up and grin." She compared Haha, I'm Sorry to Why?'s 2003 album, Oaklandazulasylum. Jody Rosen of Rolling Stone compared Kitty to Taylor Swift, saying they are both "whip-smart young [women] from the suburbs with a gift for pouring [their] loves and loathings into sharp, catchy songs."

== Track listing ==
Digital download
No.	Title	Writer(s)	Producer(s)	Length
1.	"Okay Cupid"	Kathryn Beckwith; Louis Michael Hernandez	Beautiful Lou	2:47
2.	"Orion's Belt" (featuring Riff Raff)	Beckwith; Horst Christian Simco; Hernandez	Beautiful Lou	2:26
3.	"Smiledog.jpg"	Beckwith; Hernandez	Beautiful Lou	2:16
4.	"Ay Shawty: The Shrekoning!!!!" (featuring Dankte)	Beckwith; Dante Cole; Devante Tillis	Sela	2:34
5.	"Give Me Scabies"	Beckwith; Grant Payton	Grant	2:38
Total length:				12:41

Deluxe edition
No.	Title	Writer(s)	Producer(s)	Length
6.	"Justin Bieber!!!!!"	Beckwith	Madden	3:11
7.	"Thanks Kathryn Obvious"	Beckwith; Anthony Ramsay	Ramsay	2:38
Total length:				18:23

Notes

- Titles of tracks 1, 2, 3, and 7 are stylized in all lowercase.
- "Give Me Scabies" and "Justin Bieber!!!!!" are stylized in all caps.
- "Ay Shawty: The Shrekoning!!!!" is stylized as "ay shawty: THE SHREKONING!!!!".

== Personnel ==
- Credits adapted from Bandcamp.

Performance

- Kitty - primary artist
- Riff Raff - featured artist
- Dankte - featured artist

Technical

- Beautiful Lou - producer
- Sela - producer
- Grant - producer, mixing
- Toy Trains - mixing
