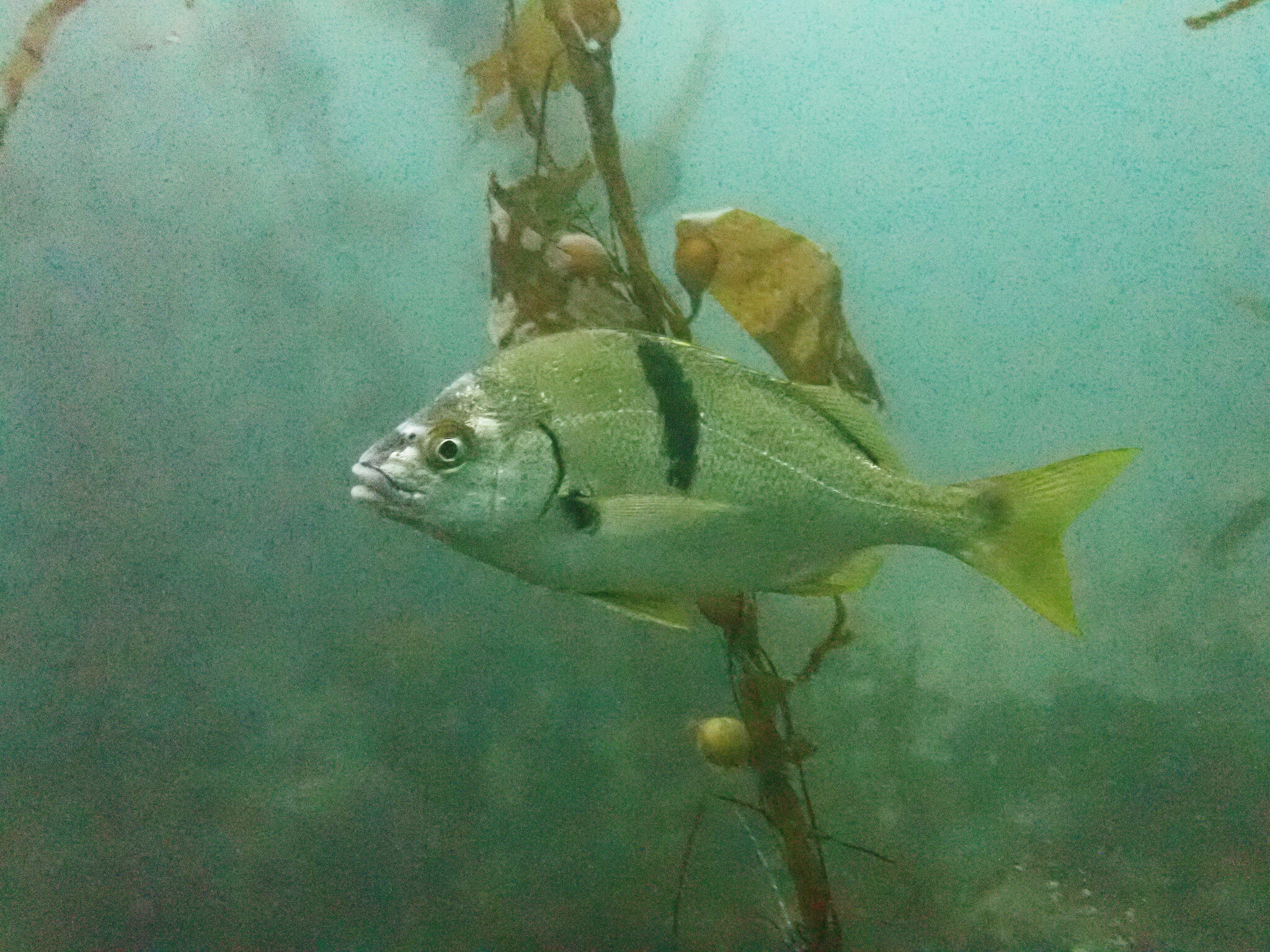

Conservation status
- Least Concern (IUCN 3.1)

Scientific classification
- Kingdom: Animalia
- Phylum: Chordata
- Class: Actinopterygii
- Order: Acanthuriformes
- Family: Haemulidae
- Genus: Anisotremus
- Species: A. davidsonii

Binomial name
- Anisotremus davidsonii (Steindachner, 1876)

= Anisotremus davidsonii =

Species of ray-finned fish

Anisotremus davidsonii, also known as the xantic sargo or simply the sargo, is a species of grunts native to the eastern Pacific Ocean. They are found from Santa Cruz, California, to Baja California, Mexico, with an isolated population located in the Gulf of California.
