= Flower Garden Banks National Marine Sanctuary =

Marine protected area off of Texas, US

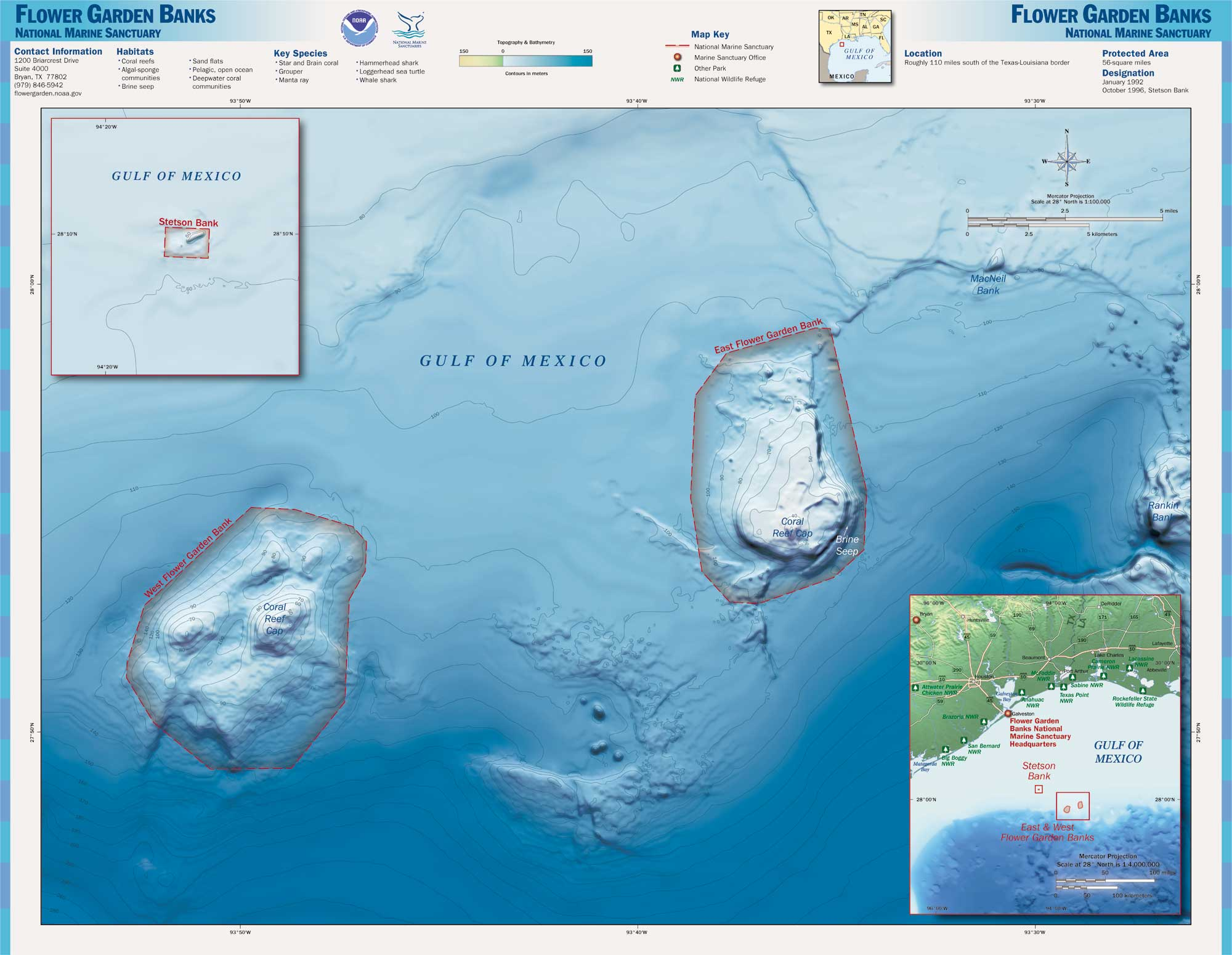
- Map of Flower Garden Banks
- Interactive map of Flower Garden Banks National Marine Sanctuary
- Location: Gulf of Mexico, United States
- Coordinates: 27°55′N 93°43′W
- Area: 160 sq mi (410 km^{2})
- Established: January 17, 1992; 34 years ago; Expanded October 11, 1996, and January 19, 2021
- Governing body: NOAA National Ocean Service
- Website: flowergarden.noaa.gov

The Flower Garden Banks National Marine Sanctuary (FGBNMS) is a United States National Marine Sanctuary located 100 nautical miles (120 mi; 190 km) off of Galveston, Texas, in the northwestern Gulf of Mexico. It contains the northernmost coral reefs in the United States.

Underlying salt domes forced the seafloor upward in various areas of the Gulf of Mexico, resulting in the formation of seamounts and ocean banks. Conditions of the Gulf of Mexico were conducive to reef-building, which started roughly ten to fifteen thousand years ago.

Two reefs, East Flower Garden Bank (EFGB) and West Flower Garden Bank (WFGB), made up Flower Garden Banks National Marine Sanctuary (FGBNMS) when it was initially created in 1992. In 1996, Stetson Bank was added to the sanctuary. The three banks are not contiguous.

The sanctuary contains many aquatic species. Almost three hundred species of fish and over twenty species of coral are found in the sanctuary along with a wide variety of crustaceans, sponges, and plants. FGBNMS provides habitat for many protected and/or threatened species including marine mammals, sharks, rays, and sea turtles. Many fish species important to recreational and commercial fisheries inhabit the banks.

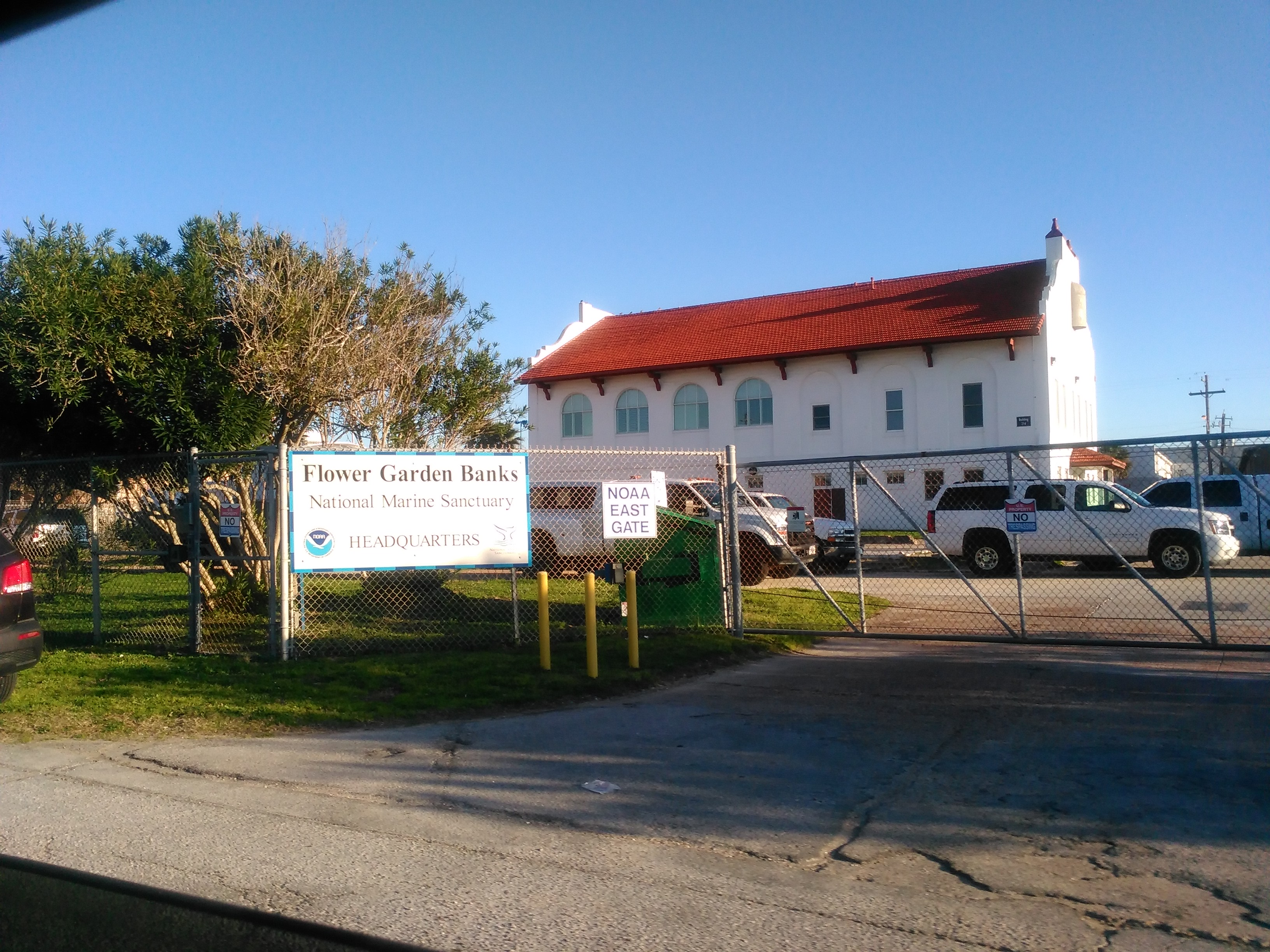
Sanctuary administrative headquarters in Galveston, Texas

The sanctuary's administrative offices and laboratories are located in a part of the former Fort Crockett in Galveston, Texas. Research Vessel MANTA is also located in Galveston, and provides a working platform for researchers. A system of mooring buoys, which reduces resource impacts from anchoring, is maintained by FGBNMS staff.

Since 2011, the Foundation funded annual scientific cruise ships to monitor the health of the coral in the sanctuary. Researchers record conditions and detect early warning signs consisting of different impacts of climate change and possible environmental crime. Scientists use the long-term data to establish baselines, understand changes and assess why reefs become unhealthy. This ongoing record was priceless in 2016 when the Sanctuary discovered a vast coral die-off in its East Bank. While the event has stabilized, the Foundation continues to dedicate additional funding to support further observation. The Foundation also funds economic impact studies on commercial and recreational activity in the area to understand use and inform protection planning and potential expansion.

== History ==
The ocean banks comprising FGBNMS were first mapped in 1936, when EFGB, WFGB, and Stetson Bank were included in a hydrographic survey of the Gulf of Mexico conducted by the United States Coast and Geodetic Survey. These initial surveys, along with others conducted in the 1950s, led researchers to conclude that the banks originated when salt domes forced overlaying sediments upward to form seamounts.

Before the early 1960s it was debated whether coral reefs could develop off the Texas coast; some researchers predicted the area would be too cold, or too turbid to support any extensive reef development. A series of scientific scuba diving expeditions, however, revealed that EFGB and WFGB did indeed support extensive coral reef systems. The late 1960s saw the establishment of the Flower Gardens Ocean Research Center (FGORC), a scientific facility whose research inspired federal agencies to begin discussing protecting the banks from human activities, including oil and gas extraction, fishing, and anchoring on the reefs.

With passage of the Marine Protection, Research, and Sanctuaries Act of 1972, the Flower Garden Banks became a candidate for designation as a United States National Marine Sanctuary. The Houston Underwater Club led a movement to have the banks officially designated as sanctuaries by submitting a formal letter of nomination in 1979. President George H. W. Bush authorized Flower Garden Banks National Marine Sanctuary as the 10th National Marine Sanctuary on January 17, 1992. The sanctuary was enlarged to include Stetson Bank in 1996.

In June 2008, the marine sanctuary was assigned RV Manta, a research vessel in service with the National Oceanic and Atmospheric Administration, to be its primary monitoring vessel and standby ship for emergency response.

=== Expansion ===
On January 19, 2021, NOAA issued the Final Instruction for expansion of Flower Garden Banks National Marine Sanctuary. This action protects 14 additional reefs and banks, slightly adjusts the boundaries of the sanctuary's original three banks and expands the sanctuary from 56 square miles (145 km^{2}) to a total of 160 square miles (415 km^{2}). The operative date of this action is March 22, 2021.

The final rule applies existing sanctuary regulations to all the new areas, supplying protection from the destructive impact of activities relevant to fishing with bottom-tending gear, ship anchoring, oil and gas exploration and production, and salvage activities on sensitive biological resources.

These areas include critical habitat for recreationally and commercially important fish, as well as threatened or endangered species of manta rays, sea turtles, and corals in the Gulf of Mexico.

== Biology ==
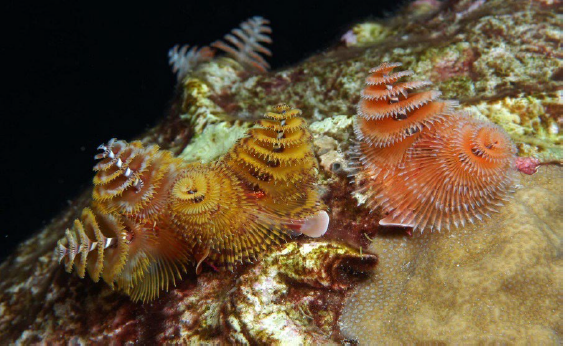
Christmas tree worms (Spirobranchus giganteus) on a coral head in the sanctuary.

Diving and sightseeing are popular activities in and near this sanctuary.

The three banks—East Flower Garden Bank, West Flower Garden Bank, and Stetson Bank—are underwater mountains. The banks support coral reefs, some of the healthiest in the Caribbean and Western Atlantic region. These reef communities began developing on the salt domes approximately 10,000–15,000 years ago. Today, they support a complex, balanced ecosystem of shallow and deep-water species.

Flower Garden Banks and areas near the sanctuary are one of only two places in the world where the golden phase of the smooth trunkfish can be found, the other being near the Bay Islands north of Honduras. The golden smooth trunkfish is not a distinct species but a different color variation of the smooth trunkfish that inhabits throughout the rest of the Caribbean and Gulf of Mexico, including Florida Keys National Marine Sanctuary. Scientists have not yet discovered the reason for the color differences in the Flower Garden Banks and Honduran populations.

Every August, about a week after the full moon, a mass coral spawning event takes place in and near the sanctuary. For some days, multiple species of star coral and brain corals release gametes into the water. This event allows for genetic mixing between different species of corals and increases diversification.

Manta rays, the largest species of ray in the ocean with a wingspans upwards of 29 feet (8.8 m) and weighing as much as 3,600 pounds (1,600 kg), are a common sight in and near the sanctuary. Recent research confirmed that Flower Garden Banks serves as a critical nursery habitat for oceanic manta rays, offering young mantas protection from human activity. The sanctuary works toward the conservation of manta rays through expansion of the habitat.

The spotted eagle ray school in and around the sanctuary during the early part of the year. They have a pronounced head with a snout and distinct white spots and rings on their dark backs. They also have very long whip-like tails, longer than most other rays, with venomous spines used in defense when they are threatened. They can grow to have wingspans of nearly 16 feet (4.9 m).
