= Beasts of Balance =

Tabletop game

- The game's logo
- Designers: Sensible Object
- Publication: November 2016; 9 years ago
- Genres: Tabletop game
- Players: 4
- Skills: Dexterity
- Materials required: Companion app
- Synonyms: Fabulous Beasts

Beasts of Balance is a dexterity tabletop game played alongside a companion app for iOS and Android. The game was developed by Sensible Object and released in November 2016, its soundtrack was composed by Disasterpeace. Originally titled Fabulous Beasts, the game had to be renamed following a trademark dispute with Warner Bros. over their Fantastic Beasts film.

== Gameplay ==
The game can be played solo, or co-operatively by up to 4 players. The aim of the game is to stack animal-shaped objects onto a plinth in order to build a tower. Each object is RFID tagged; these tags are read by the plinth, and communicated to the companion app via Bluetooth, allowing the app to keep score and set challenges. When the tower topples, a countdown begins, and if the players fail to re-create the tower before the timer runs out, the game ends.

The game can be extended with new animals which may be purchased individually, such as a Yogscast-inspired lion. An RFID sticker pack allows players to incorporate any object into the game.

== Development ==
Alex Fleetwood, founder of Sensible Object, describes the game as an evolution of a project from his previous company, Hide&Seek. Sensible Object received seed funding from the Arts and Humanities Research Council through their React programme. The React programme allowed the team to collaborate with University of Bath academics, and gave access to Young Coaches, children aged 7–12 who acted as playtesters. The initial prototype was built in four months.

Sensible Object explored using computer vision to track the stacked objects, but moved to a simpler method combining RFID tags in the objects and a weight sensor in the plinth. The game was prototyped on an Ultimaker 2 3D printer. Tim Burrell-Saward, one of the game's designers, described the importance of prototypes to their process: "We did lots of 3D printing – we couldn't have done this game without access to that. You can design something on screen or on paper, but it isn't until you have it in your hands that you can play with it and see if it's weighted correctly or if the angles are too hard." The game's electronics were prototyped with Arduino components, and the mobile apps were built in Unity.

The game was partly funded through a Kickstarter crowdfunding campaign, raising £168,360 towards the game's development in February 2016. In June 2016, the game was renamed from Fabulous Beasts to Beasts of Balance following a trademark dispute with Warner Bros. over their Fantastic Beasts film. The game was demoed at multiple events throughout its development, including the Game Developers Conference, Spiel, and the American International Toy Fair. At the 2015 Indiecade festival, it won the Technology Award. The game was released in November 2016.

== Reception ==
Writing in The Guardian, Stuart Dredge awarded the game 4/5 stars. He described how the game was able to maintain the interest of his 7 and 9 year old sons, but did note how they would argue over whose fault it was following a tower collapse. Matt Jarvis, in his review for Tabletop Gaming magazine, highlighted how the challenges presented by the app could introduce difficulty for experienced players, and how the scoring system introduced an element of strategy to the gameplay. He concluded that the game was "one of the finest examples of physical and digital gameplay working together yet".
