= Ricky Eat Acid =

American musician (born 1991)

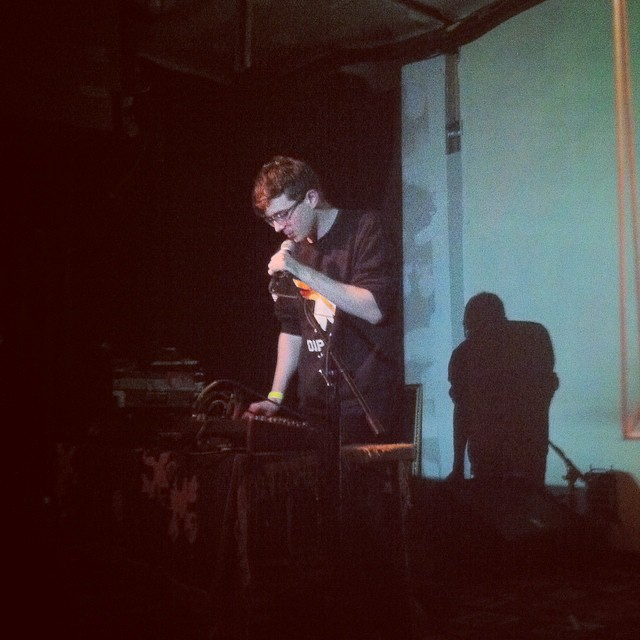
- Ray performing as Ricky Eat Acid in 2015

Background information
- Also known as: Dead Virgin; Mad Dads; Cumwolf; Cute Boy Kissing Booth; Teen Mom Birthday Cake; Heroin Party; Starry Cat
- Born: Samuel Joseph Ray; April 25, 1991 (age 34)
- Origin: Baltimore, Maryland, U.S.
- Genres: Electronic; ambient; experimental; drone; Lo-fi
- Years active: 2005–present
- Member of: Teen Suicide; The Pom-Poms
- Formerly of: Julia Brown
- Spouse: Kitty Ray (m. 2016)

Samuel Joseph Ray (born April 25, 1991), also known by the name of his solo electronic project Ricky Eat Acid, is an American musician from Baltimore, Maryland, most well known for his involvement in his band Teen Suicide.

== History ==
Sam Ray began the Ricky Eat Acid project in 2009 and released his first song on February 22, 2010 called "Angry Clouds", which appeared on his debut album Sometimes You Make People Sad, released on May 21, 2010. It was followed up by the release of Ray's first EP, HUGS on July 16, 2012, as well as his second album You Get Sick; You Regret Things on September 8, 2010. In between releasing EPs for a new project "Dead Virgin", Ray released the EPs Dance With U and Sometimes We're Blue in October and November of 2010 respectively. A year later he released an album titled Haunt U Forever via Chill Mega Chill.

In January 2012, Ray released a song titled "A Smoothie Robot For Moon Mansion" via Bad Panda Records. In December of the same year, Ray released a remastered version of You Get Sick; You Regret Things via Orchid Tapes.

In January 2014, Ray released his third full-length album (second with Orchid Tapes) titled Three Love Songs. On July 8, 2014, Ray self-released an EP titled Sun Over Hills. On July 15, 2014, Ray released a single titled "Pull (May15)" via Secret Songs.

In January 2015, Ray released a song titled "Context" via Canvasclub. In May 2015, Ray released a mixtape titled Mixtape.

On May 25, 2016, Ray married electronic artist Kitty in DeLand, Florida. On September 8, 2016, Ray debuted the first song titled "Hey" off of his latest album titled Talk To You Soon, which was released on October 28, 2016, via Terrible Records.

== Discography ==
=== Studio albums ===
- Sometimes You Make People Sad (2010, self-released)
- You Get Sick; You Regret Things (2010, self-released; 2012, Orchid Tapes)
- Haunt U Forever (2011, Chill Mega Chill)
- Seeing Little Ghosts Everywhere (2011, self-released)
- Three Love Songs (2014, Orchid Tapes)
- Talk to You Soon (2016, Terrible Records)
- Am I Happy, Singing (2018, self-released)
- When They Align Just So, Memories of Another Life Bleed into My Own (2020)

=== Extended plays ===
- HUGS (2010, self-released)
- Dance With U (2010, self-released)
- Sometimes We're Blue (2010, self-released)
- Like I Was Floating (2011, self-released)
- April (2011, self-released)
- Ambien Music (2012, self-released)
- Sun Over Hills (2014, self-released)

=== Mixtapes ===
- Mixtape (2015, self-released)

=== Singles ===
- "A Smoothie Robot for My Moon Mansion" (2012, Bad Panda)
- "Pull (May15)" (2014, Secret Songs)
- "Context" (2015, Canvasclub)

=== Compilation albums ===
- (2011_Demos) (2012, self-released)
- Three Love Songs: B-Sides & Outtakes (2014, Orchid Tapes)
- A Whole Lot of Music From Past Few Years, All of Which I Hope You Enjoy (2017, self-released)
- 2009-2016 Loose Tracks (2017, self-released)

== See also ==
- Teen Suicide
- Julia Brown
