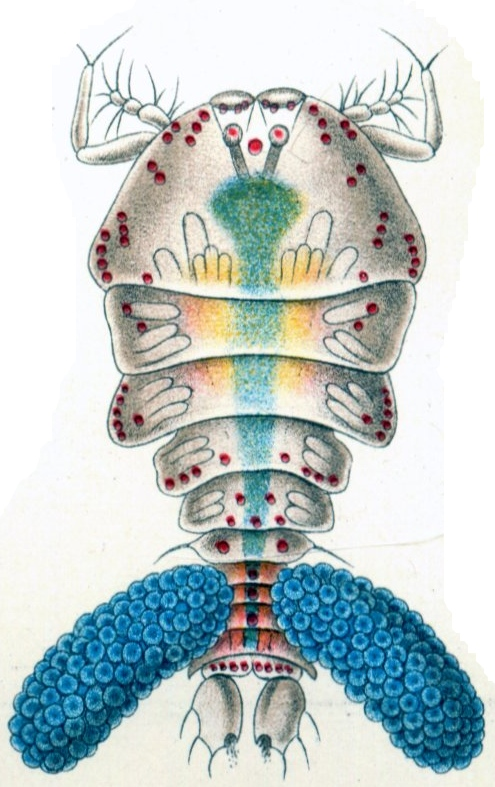
- Sapphirina darwinii with egg cases

Scientific classification
- Kingdom: Animalia
- Phylum: Arthropoda
- Clade: Pancrustacea
- Class: Copepoda
- Order: Cyclopoida
- Suborder: Poecilostomatoida; Thorell, 1859

Families
- See text

= Poecilostomatoida =

Suborder of crustaceans

Poecilostomatoida is a suborder of copepods. Although it was previously considered a separate order.

== Description ==
The classification of these copepods has been established on the basis of the structure of the mouth. In poecilostomatoids the mouth is represented by a transverse slit, partially covered by the overhanging labrum which resembles an upper lip. Although there is variability in the form of the mandible among poecilostomatoids, it can be generalized as being falcate (sickle-shaped).

The antennules are frequently reduced in size and the antennae modified to terminate in small hooks or claws that are used in attachment to host organisms.

== Life cycle ==
As with many crustaceans, larval development is metamorphic with immature forms differing greatly from those of adults. Embryos are carried in paired or single sacs attached to first abdominal somite (as seen in the illustration of the female Sapphirina darwinii above right).

== Ecology ==
Most poecilostomatoid copepods are ectoparasites of saltwater fish or invertebrates (including among the latter mollusks and echinoderms). They usually attach to the external surface of the host, in the throat-mouth cavity, or the gills. One family of poecilostomatoid copepods, however, have evolved an endoparasitic mode of life and live deep within their hosts' bodies rather than merely attaching themselves to exterior and semi-exterior surface tissue.

In addition to typical marine environments, poecilostomatoid copepods may be found in such very particular habitats as anchialine caves and deep sea vents (both hydrothermal vents and cold seeps). Here, many primitive associated copepods belonging to the Poecilostomatoida and Siphonostomatoida and have been found. Representatives of one Poecilostomatoida family have successfully made the transition to freshwater habitats and host animals therein.

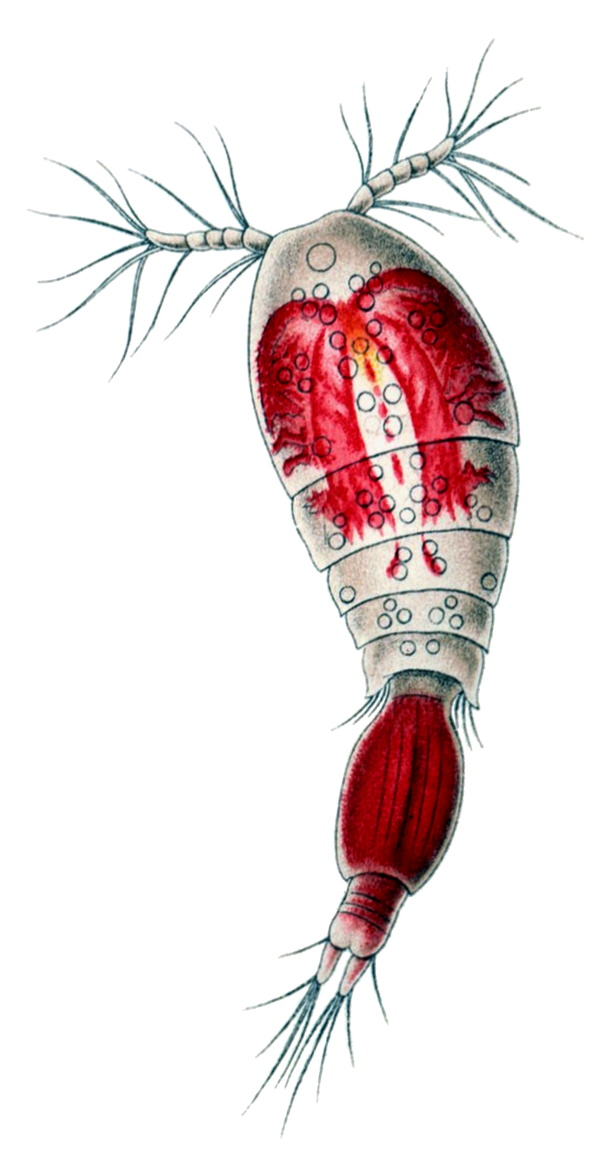
Male Oncaea venusta

== List of families ==
There are over sixty families currently recognized within the group:

- Abrsiidae
- Anchimolgidae
- Anomoclausiidae
- Antheacheridae
- Anthessiidae
- Bomolochidae
- Bradophilidae
- Catiniidae
- Chondracanthidae
- Clausidiidae
- Clausiidae
- Corallovexiidae
- Corycaeidae
- Echiurophilidae
- Entobiidae
- Erebonasteridae
- Ergasilidae
- Eunicicolidae
- Gadilicolidae
- Gastrodelphyidae
- Herpyllobiidae
- Intramolgidae
- Iveidae
- Jasmineiricolidae
- Kelleriidae
- Lamippidae
- Leaniricolidae
- Lichomolgidae
- Lubbockiidae
- Macrochironidae
- Makrostrotidae
- Mesoglicolidae
- Myicolidae
- Mytilicolidae
- Nereicolidae
- Octopicolidae
- Oncaeidae
- Paralubbockiidae
- Philichthyidae
- Philoblennidae
- Phyllodicolidae
- Pionodesmotidae
- Polyankyliidae
- Pseudanthessiidae
- Rhynchomolgidae
- Sabelliphilidae
- Saccopsidae
- Sapphirinidae
- Serpulidicolidae
- Shiinoidae
- Spiophanicolidae
- Splanchnotrophidae
- Strepidae
- Synapticolidae
- Synaptiphilidae
- Taeniacanthidae
- Telsidae
- Thamnomolgidae
- Tuccidae
- Umazurcolidae
- Urocopiidae
- Vahiniidae
- Ventriculinidae
- Xarifiidae
- Xenocoelomatidae
