= Hamaticolax unisagittatus =

Scientific classification
- Kingdom: Animalia
- Phylum: Arthropoda
- Clade: Pancrustacea
- Class: Copepoda
- Order: Cyclopoida
- Family: Bomolochidae
- Genus: Hamaticolax
- Species: H. unisagittatus

Binomial name
- Hamaticolax unisagittatus (Tavares & Luque, 2003)

Species of parasitic copepod

Hamaticolax unisagittatus is a species of parasitic copepod belonging to the family Bomolochidae. It is a parasite on the gills of the common snook and has only been recorded in coastal waters off Rio de Janeiro State. In one study over half of the host fish sampled in this area carried this parasite.

The female is up to 1.4 millimetres (0.055 in) long; the male is as yet unknown. Originally described in the genus Acantholochus, it was later transferred to the genus Hamaticolax.
