= Arthurius bunakenensis =

Scientific classification
- Kingdom: Animalia
- Phylum: Arthropoda
- Class: Copepoda
- Order: Cyclopoida
- Family: Splanchnotrophidae
- Genus: Arthurius
- Species: A. bunakenensis

Binomial name
- Arthurius bunakenensis Salmen, Kaligis, Mamangkey & Schrödl, 2008

Species of copepod

Arthurius bunakenensis is a species of endoparasitic copepod in the family Splanchnotrophidae.
