= Echinosocius elatensis =

Scientific classification
- Kingdom: Animalia
- Phylum: Arthropoda
- Clade: Pancrustacea
- Class: Copepoda
- Order: Cyclopoida
- Family: Taeniacanthidae
- Genus: Echinosocius
- Species: E. elatensis

Binomial name
- Echinosocius elatensis Jacob-Judah, 1975

Species of copepod

Echinosocius elatensis is a species of copepod in the family Taeniacanthidae. First formally described in 1975, it has a commensal relationship with Diadema setosum, a species of sea urchin.

== Taxonomy ==
The species was first described by Sheba Jacob-Judah in 1975 from Diadema setosum specimens collected from the Gulf of Aqaba.

== Description ==
When the caudal rami are included in the measurement, females of this species are 1.43 mm long and males are 0.51 mm long. They are white, with a red-violet streak running along the center of the upper surface. The wide cephalothorax has fine hairs on the upper surface and sides. They have a poorly developed rostrum, and the head is fused with the first leg-bearing segment. The antennules have six segments, with the first making up nearly half the length and the second and third segments imperfectly separated. The free thoracic segments become smaller the further they are from the head.

In the third and fourth pairs of legs, the third segment of the endopods has two setae.

== Ecology ==
Echinosocius elatensis lives on the spines of Diadema setosum, specifically those around the urchin's anus, and it is assumed that they feed on the host's waste material. Females live on the thicker spines and males live on the thinner ones.
