= Shiinoidae =

Scientific classification
- Kingdom: Animalia
- Phylum: Arthropoda
- Clade: Pancrustacea
- Class: Copepoda
- Order: Cyclopoida
- Suborder: Ergasilida
- Family: Shiinoidae; Cressey, 1975

Genera and species
- Shiinoa Kabata, 1968; Parashiinoa West, 1986

Family of crustaceans

Shiinoidae is a family of parasitic copepods found on marine teleosts.

== Description ==
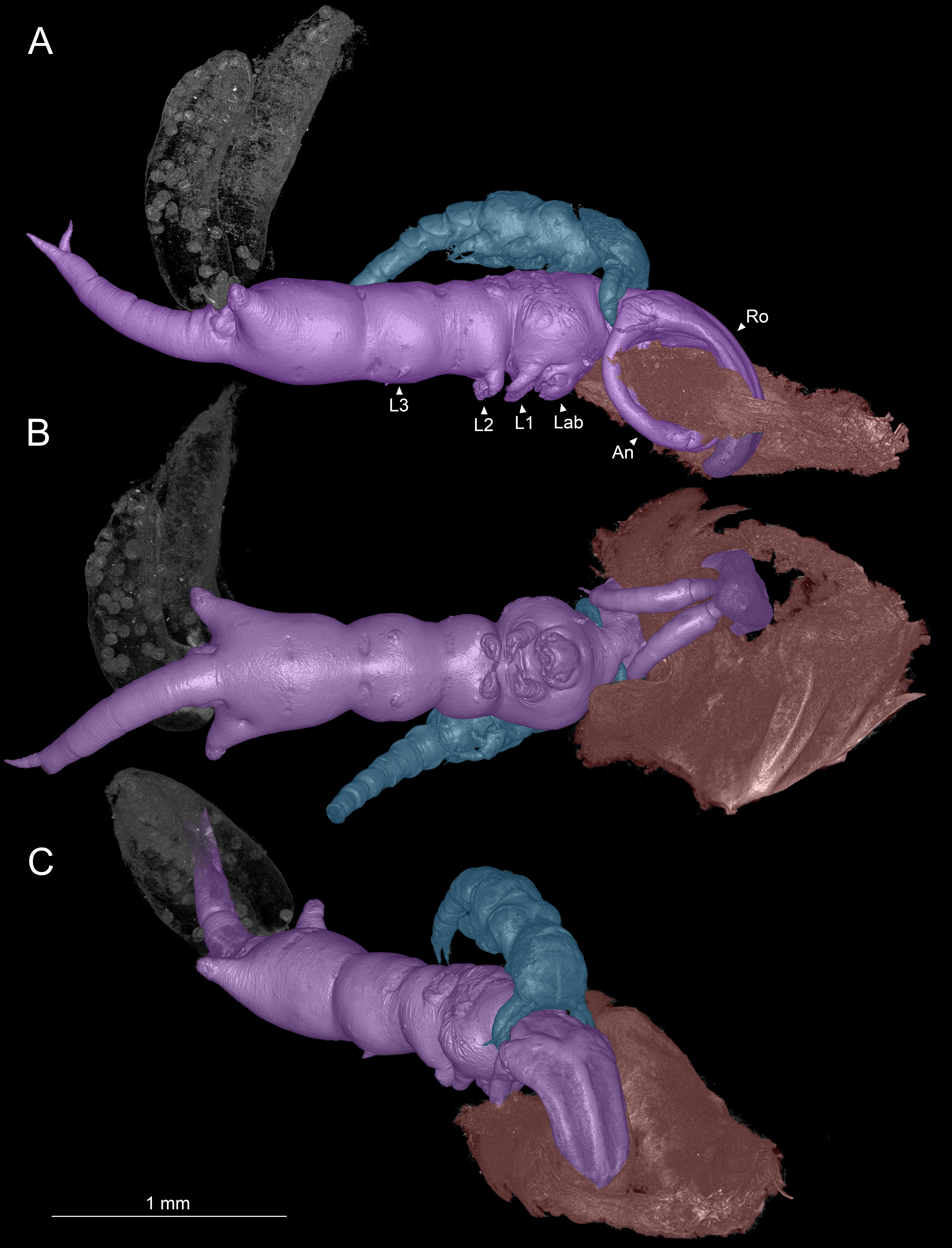
Colorized microCT volume rendering of Shiinoa inauris. Female copepod (purple), male (blue), host tissue (red)

The family Shiinoidae consists of nine species of morphologically unusual copepods that parasitize marine teleosts. The body of shiinoids exhibits many cases of reduced segmentation and segmental fusions, including the complete loss of several appendages. Most strikingly, females in this family possess a pair of large antennae that are anteriorly directed and oppose a rostrum, which is formed from an outgrowth of cuticle between the antennules and can reach 30% of their body length. Together the antennae and the rostrum form a clasp that shiinoids use to attach to their teleost hosts, usually to gill-like tissue in the nostrils or, rarely, to the skin of their hosts.

== Genera and species ==
The first species in the family to be described was Shiinoa occlusa, a single immature female of which was discovered on the fish Scomberomorus commerson, and described by Kabata in 1968. A second species, S. inauris, was found on Scomberomorus regalis and described by Roger Cressey in 1975, who also erected the family to hold the genus Shiinoa alone. A second genus was added in 1986, containing the single species Parashiinoa mackayi, which had been found on the fishes Pomadasys maculatus and P. argenteus.

Nine species are now recognized in the two genera:

Shiinoa Kabata, 1968

- Shiinoa elagata Cressey, 1976
- Shiinoa inauris Cressey, 1975
- Shiinoa japonica Izawa, 2009
- Shiinoa occlusa Kabata, 1968
- Shiinoa prionura Izawa, 2009

Parashiinoa West, 1986

- Parashiinoa bakeri (Cressey & Cressey, 1986)
- Parashiinoa cookeola Izawa, 2009
- Parashiinoa mackayi West, 1986
- Parashiinoa rostrata (Balaraman, Prabha & Pillai, 1984)
