= Clausia =

Clausia may refer to:

- Clausia, synonym of Pseudocalanus, a genus of copepod crustaceans in the family Clausiidae
- Clausia (plant), a genus of flowering plants in the family Brassicaceae
