= Cyclorhiza =

Cyclorhiza may refer to:

- Cyclorhiza (copepod), a genus of copepods in the family Phyllodicolidae
- Cyclorhiza (plant), a genus of flowering plants in the family Apiaceae
