= Sarcotaces =

Scientific classification
- Domain: Eukaryota
- Kingdom: Animalia
- Phylum: Arthropoda
- Class: Copepoda
- Order: Cyclopoida
- Family: Philichthyidae
- Genus: Sarcotaces; Olsson, 1872

Genus of crustaceans

Sarcotaces is a genus of copepods, containing the following species:

- Sarcotaces arcticus Collett, 1874
- Sarcotaces japonicus Izawa, 1974
- Sarcotaces komaii Shiino, 1953
- Sarcotaces namibiensis Reimer, 1991
- Sarcotaces pacificus Komai, 1924
- Sarcotaces shiinoi Izawa, 1974
- Sarcotaces verrucosus Olsson, 1872

== Description ==
All live in salt water. All are parasites. Some live on the skin of their hosts; others live inside them.
