= Agetus =

Scientific classification
- Domain: Eukaryota
- Kingdom: Animalia
- Phylum: Arthropoda
- Class: Copepoda
- Order: Cyclopoida
- Family: Corycaeidae
- Genus: Agetus; Krøyer, 1849

Genus of copepods

Agetus is a genus of copepods belonging to the family Corycaeidae.

The genus has almost cosmopolitan distribution.

Species:

- Agetus flaccus (Giesbrecht, 1891)
- Agetus limbatus (Brady, 1883)
- Agetus typicus Krøyer, 1849
