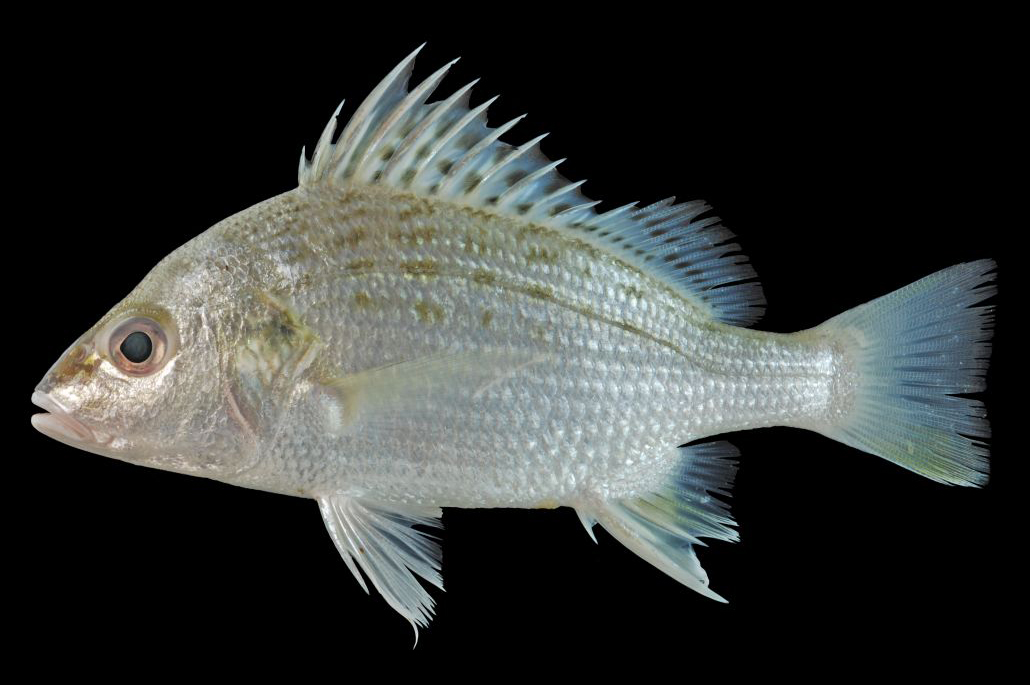

Conservation status
- Least Concern (IUCN 3.1)

Scientific classification
- Kingdom: Animalia
- Phylum: Chordata
- Class: Actinopterygii
- Order: Acanthuriformes
- Family: Haemulidae
- Genus: Pomadasys
- Species: P. kaakan

Binomial name
- Pomadasys kaakan (Cuvier, 1830)

Synonyms
- Pristipoma kaakan Cuvier, 1830; Pomadasys nageb (Rüppell, 1838)

= Pomadasys kaakan =

Species of fish

Pomadasys kaakan, the javelin grunter or barred javelin is a species of marine ray-finned fish, a grunt belonging to the family Haemulidae. It is native to the Indian and Pacific Oceans, from Africa to Australia.

== Description ==
Pomadasys kaakan has a blunt head which has a convex upper profile and a small mouth which has brushlike bands of teeth on its jaws. There are two pores and a central pit on the chin. The juveniles are bright silvery green dorsally, golden silver on the flanks and silvery white on the underparts, there are no fewer than 12 indistinct vertical bars which are made up of small dark brown spots or irregular blotches. The dorsal fin has blackish-brown spots on the basal part of its spiny portion and there are three rows of spots on the soft-rayed part which has a dark margin while the lower tip of the caudal fin is milky. The adults are plain golden green dorsally and silver ventrally with the bars and dorsal fin spots being indistinct or absent. The dorsal fin has 12 spines and 13-15 soft rays, while the anal fin contains 3 spines and 7 soft rays. This species attains a maximum total length of 80 cm (31 in), although 50 cm (20 in) is more typical.

== Distribution ==
Pomadasys kaakan is found in the Indo-Pacific. It ranges along the eastern coast of Africa from the Red Sea to the Eastern Cape, along the southern coast of Asia, including the Persian Gulf, to China and Taiwan and along the northern coasts of Australia from Exmouth Gulf in Western Australia to Moreton Bay in Queensland. It is also found in Comoro Islands, Madagascar, the Seychelles and the Farquhar Islands.

== Habitat and biology ==
Pomadasys kaakan is found in turbid waters near the coast where the substrate consists of sand or mud to depths of 75 metres (246 ft). They will enter estuarine environments, and they may be able tolerate water with low salinity. Frequently found in and around inshore shipwrecks. They are also known from coral and rocky reefs. They spawn in shoals near river mouths during the winter. They are oviparous and form distinct pairs to spawn. Their diet is largely crustaceans, and they are known to feed on fishes, molluscs, brittle stars, Lingula sp. and algae.

== Systematics ==
Pomadasys kaakan was first formally described as Pristipoma kaakan in 1830 by the French anatomist, zoologist and naturalist Georges Cuvier (179–1832) with the type locality given jointly as Arian Coupang River, Pondicherry and Mahé in India. The specific name kaakan is the local name for this species used in Pondicherry. P. kaakan was considered a junior synonym of Pomadasys hasta in error.

== Utilisation ==
Pomadasys kaakan is an important target species for commercial fisheries throughout the Persian Gulf and it is caught with bottom trawls, bottom longline, gillnets and traps. It is taken as bycatch in shrimp fisheries in the Persian Gulf too. The catch is marketed fresh or preserved by salting or smoking.
