= Cyclopicina longifurcata =

Scientific classification
- Domain: Eukaryota
- Kingdom: Animalia
- Phylum: Arthropoda
- Class: Copepoda
- Order: Cyclopoida
- Family: Cyclopicinidae
- Genus: Cyclopicina
- Species: C. longifurcata

Binomial name
- Cyclopicina longifurcata (Scott, 1901)

Species of copepod

Cyclopicina longifurcata is a species of copepod belonging to the family Cyclopicinidae. It was first described by Thomas Scott in 1901. This species is part of the order Cyclopoida, a group of small crustaceans commonly found in marine and freshwater habitats.

== Description ==
This species is characterized by its elongated furca (tail-like structure), which is a distinctive feature within its genus. Like other copepods, Cyclopicina longifurcata plays a role in aquatic ecosystems as part of the zooplankton community.

== Distribution ==
Cyclopicina longifurcata has been recorded in various marine environments. Observations have been noted in different ocean regions, including the North Atlantic and the Indian Ocean.
