= Ubius =

Scientific classification
- Domain: Eukaryota
- Kingdom: Animalia
- Phylum: Arthropoda
- Class: Copepoda
- Order: Cyclopoida
- Family: Iveidae
- Genus: Ubius; Kesteven, 1913
- Species: U. hilli

Binomial name
- Ubius hilli Kesteven, 1913

Genus of crustaceans

Ubius is a monotypic genus of copepods belonging to the family Iveidae. The only species is Ubius hilli.
