= Kelleria multiovigera =

Scientific classification
- Domain: Eukaryota
- Kingdom: Animalia
- Phylum: Arthropoda
- Class: Copepoda
- Order: Cyclopoida
- Family: Kelleriidae
- Genus: Kelleria
- Species: K. multiovigera

Binomial name
- Kelleria multiovigera Kim I.H., 2009

Species of copepod

Kelleria multiovigera is a species of copepod, in the Kelleriidae family, which was first described in 2009 by Il-Hoi Kim, from a specimen collected from a sponge, in the waters off Pointe Lokobe, Madagascar.
