= Tucca =

Scientific classification
- Kingdom: Animalia
- Phylum: Arthropoda
- Clade: Pancrustacea
- Class: Copepoda
- Order: Cyclopoida
- Family: Taeniacanthidae
- Genus: Tucca
- Species: T. impressus

Binomial name
- Tucca impressus Krøyer, 1837

Genus of crustaceans

Tucca is a monotypic genus of parasitic copepods in the family Taeniacanthidae, in the order Cyclopoida. Its only species is Tucca impressus.
