= Echinosocius =

Scientific classification
- Kingdom: Animalia
- Phylum: Arthropoda
- Clade: Pancrustacea
- Class: Copepoda
- Order: Cyclopoida
- Family: Taeniacanthidae
- Genus: Echinosocius; Humes & Cressey, 1961

Genus of copepods

Echinosocius is a genus of copepods in the family Taeniacanthidae. The feature that best distinguishes this genus from others in its family is the maxillipeds, which are pear-shaped, non-prehensile and clawless in females. All known species of this genus were collected from Diadema setosum, a species of sea urchin.

== Species ==
Echinosocius contains the following species:

- Echinosocius dentatus Humes & Cressey, 1961
- Echinosocius elatensis Jacob-Judah, 1975
- Echinosocius finitimus Dojiri & Humes, 1982
- Echinosocius gulicolus Dojiri & Humes, 1982
- Echinosocius pectinatus Humes & Cressey, 1961
