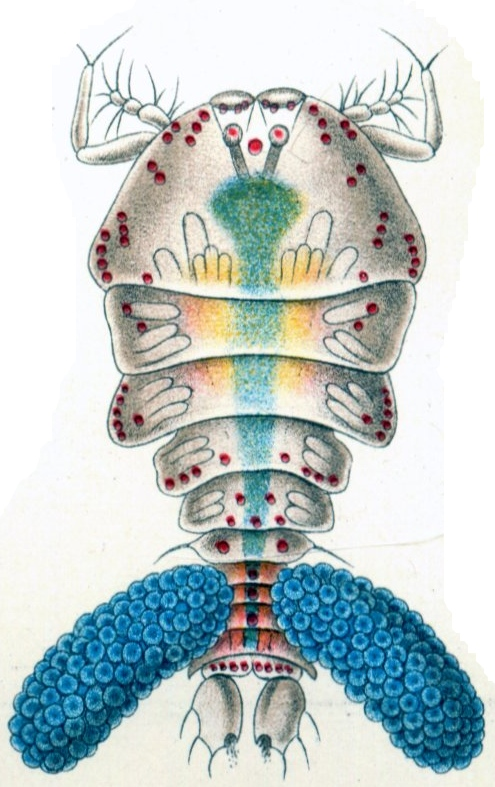
- Sapphirina darwinii with egg cases

Scientific classification
- Domain: Eukaryota
- Kingdom: Animalia
- Phylum: Arthropoda
- Class: Copepoda
- Order: Cyclopoida
- Family: Sapphirinidae
- Genus: Sapphirina; J. Thompson, 1830

Species
- See text

= Sapphirina =

Genus of crustaceans

Sapphirina, whose members are commonly known as sea sapphires, is a genus of parasitic copepods in the family Sapphirinidae.

== Description ==
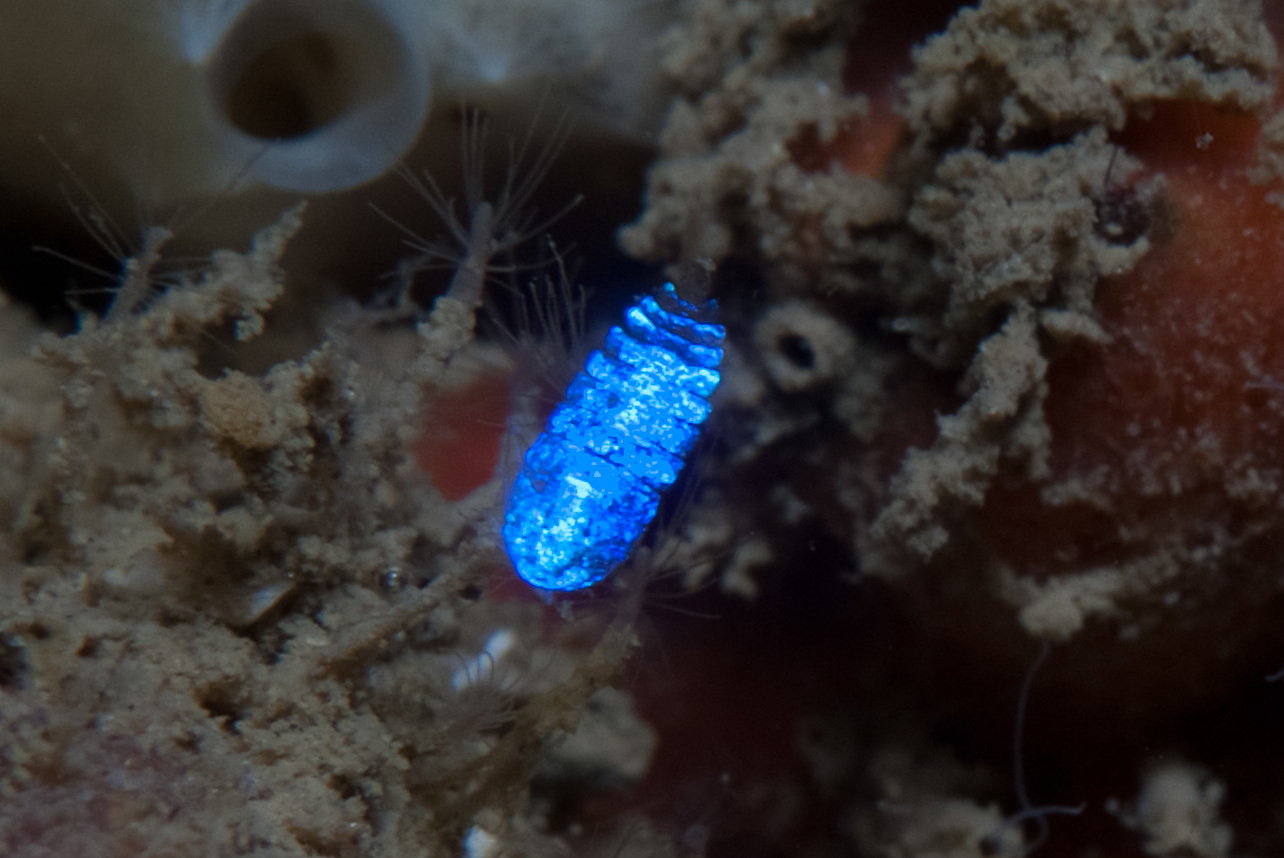
Sapphirina sp.

Various species of male Sapphirina shine in different hues, from bright gold to deep blue. This is partially due to structural coloration in which microscopic layers of crystal plates inside their cells which are separated by minute distances, and these distances equal the same wavelength of the corresponding color of their "shine".

The females are translucent, as are the males when they are not shining.

== Species ==
The genus Sapphirina consists of the following species:

- Sapphirina angusta Dana, 1849
- Sapphirina aureofurca Giesbrecht, 1891
- Sapphirina auronitens Claus, 1863
- Sapphirina bella Dana, 1849
- Sapphirina bicuspidata Giesbrecht, 1891
- Sapphirina clausii (Haeckel, 1864)
- Sapphirina coruscans Dana, 1849
- Sapphirina cylindrica Lubbock, 1860
- Sapphirina danae Lubbock, 1856
- Sapphirina darwinii Haeckel, 1864
- Sapphirina detonsa Dana, 1849
- Sapphirina edwardsii (Haeckel, 1864)
- Sapphirina elegans Lubbock, 1860
- Sapphirina fulgens Templeton, 1836
- Sapphirina gastrica Giesbrecht, 1891
- Sapphirina gegenbauri (Haeckel, 1864)
- Sapphirina gemma Dana, 1852
- Sapphirina gibba Rose, 1929
- Sapphirina granulosa Giesbrecht, 1891
- Sapphirina inaequalis Dana, 1852
- Sapphirina indicator J. V. Thompson, 1829
- Sapphirina indigotica Dana, 1849
- Sapphirina intestinata Giesbrecht, 1891
- Sapphirina iris Dana, 1849
- Sapphirina lactens Giesbrecht, 1893
- Sapphirina lomae Esterly, 1905
- Sapphirina longifurca A. Scott, 1909
- Sapphirina maculosa Giesbrecht, 1893
- Sapphirina metallina Dana, 1849
- Sapphirina nigromaculata Claus, 1863
- Sapphirina nitens Lubbock, 1860
- Sapphirina obesa Dana, 1849
- Sapphirina obtusa Dana, 1849
- Sapphirina opaca Lubbock, 1856
- Sapphirina opalina Dana, 1849
- Sapphirina opalina-darwini Lehnhofer, 1929
- Sapphirina orientalis Dana, 1849
- Sapphirina ovalis Dana, 1849
- Sapphirina ovata Dana, 1849
- Sapphirina ovatolanceolata Dana, 1849
- Sapphirina ovatolanceolata-gemma Lehnhofer, 1929
- Sapphirina pachygaster Claus, 1863
- Sapphirina parva Lubbock, 1860
- Sapphirina pseudolactens Lehnhofer, 1929
- Sapphirina pyrosomatis Giesbrecht, 1893
- Sapphirina reticulata Brady, 1883
- Sapphirina sali Farran, 1929
- Sapphirina salpae Claus, 1859
- Sapphirina scalaris Fischer, 1860
- Sapphirina scarlata Giesbrecht, 1891
- Sapphirina serrata Brady, 1883
- Sapphirina sinuicauda Brady, 1883
- Sapphirina splendens Dana, 1852
- Sapphirina stellata Giesbrecht, 1891
- Sapphirina stylifera Lubbock, 1856
- Sapphirina tenella Dana, 1849
- Sapphirina thomsoni Lubbock, 1860
- Sapphirina uncinata Leuckart, 1853
- Sapphirina versicolor Dana, 1849
- Sapphirina vorax Giesbrecht, 1891
