= Paralubbockia =

Scientific classification
- Kingdom: Animalia
- Phylum: Arthropoda
- Clade: Pancrustacea
- Class: Copepoda
- Order: Cyclopoida
- Suborder: Ergasilida
- Family: Paralubbockiidae; Boxshall & Huys, 1989
- Genus: Paralubbockia; Boxshall, 1977
- Species: P. longipedia

Binomial name
- Paralubbockia longipedia Boxshall, 1977

Genus of crustaceans

Paralubbockia longipedia is a species of copepod, and the only member of the family Paralubbockiidae. The family is characterised by the ventral position of the fifth legs, the possession of a separate maxillary palp, and the form of the endopods of the legs and antennae. The closest relatives of Paralubbockia are the family Oncaeidae. Initially placed among the Poecilostomatoida, Paralubbockia is now considered part of the Cyclopoida.
