= Hamaticolax =

Scientific classification
- Kingdom: Animalia
- Phylum: Arthropoda
- Clade: Pancrustacea
- Class: Copepoda
- Order: Cyclopoida
- Family: Bomolochidae
- Genus: Hamaticolax; Ho & Lin, 2006

Genus of parasitic copepods

Hamaticolax is a genus of parasitic copepods belonging to the family Bomolochidae. Its members can only be distinguished from the closely related genus Acantholochus by the presence of an accessory process on the claw of the maxillipeds. It includes the following species:

- Hamaticolax attenuatus (Wilson C.B., 1913)
- Hamaticolax coelorinchi Izawa, 2022
- Hamaticolax embiotocae (Hanan, 1976)
- Hamaticolax galeichthyos (Luque & Bruno, 1990)
- Hamaticolax hymenocephali Izawa, 2025
- Hamaticolax juanji Dallarés, Constenla & Carrassón, 2018
- Hamaticolax maleus (Oldewage, 1994)
- Hamaticolax occultus (Kabata, 1971)
- Hamaticolax paralabracis (Luque & Bruno, 1990)
- Hamaticolax physiculi Izawa, 2022
- Hamaticolax prolixus (Cressey, 1969)
- Hamaticolax resupinus Pérez-i-García, Carrassón & Boxshall, 2017
- Hamaticolax scutigerulus (Wilson C.B., 1935)
- Hamaticolax spinulus (Cressey, 1969)
- Hamaticolax unisagittatus (Tavares & Luque, 2003)
