= Speleoithona bermudensis =

Conservation status
- Critically Endangered (IUCN 2.3)

Scientific classification
- Kingdom: Animalia
- Phylum: Arthropoda
- Clade: Pancrustacea
- Class: Copepoda
- Order: Cyclopoida
- Family: Speleoithonidae
- Genus: Speleoithona
- Species: S. bermudensis

Binomial name
- Speleoithona bermudensis Rocha & Iliffe, 1993

Species of crustacean

Speleoithona bermudensis is a species of copepod in the family Speleoithonidae. It was formally described in 1993 and is named after the island to which it is endemic, Bermuda. On Bermuda, it has been recorded from Bee Pit Cave and Walsingham Cave, two anchialine limestone karst caves located in Hamilton Parish. It lives in the water and in submerged soil in these caves. These copepods have translucent bodies and reach lengths of 260–290 micrometres in females and 255–300 μm in males. A 1996 assessment of the species' conservation status by the IUCN classified it as being critically endangered.

== Taxonomy ==
Speleoithona bermudensis was formally described in 1993 based on a female holotype collected from Bee Pit Cave in Bermuda. It is named after the island on which it was discovered.

== Description ==
These copepods have translucent bodies and are distinguished from other species in their genus by the shape of their swimming legs. Females reach lengths of 260–290 micrometres, while males reach lengths of 255–300 μm.

== Distribution and conservation ==
Like the rest of the genus Speleoithona, S. bermudensis is endemic to the British Overseas Territory of Bermuda in the North Atlantic Ocean. It inhabits anchialine limestone karst caves, having been recorded from the Bee Pit Cave and Walsingham Cave in Hamilton Parish. These two caves are likely part of the same cave system formed by connected, collapsed caverns located underwater and forming shallow pools open to variable amounts of life upon reaching the surface. In Bee Pit Cave, S. bermudensis was collected from the water and soil bed from a shadowed pool at depths of up to 1 m (3.3 ft). In Walsingham Cave, it was collected from the water at depths of up to 4 m (13 ft).

A 1996 assessment of the species' conservation status by the IUCN classified it as being critically endangered.
