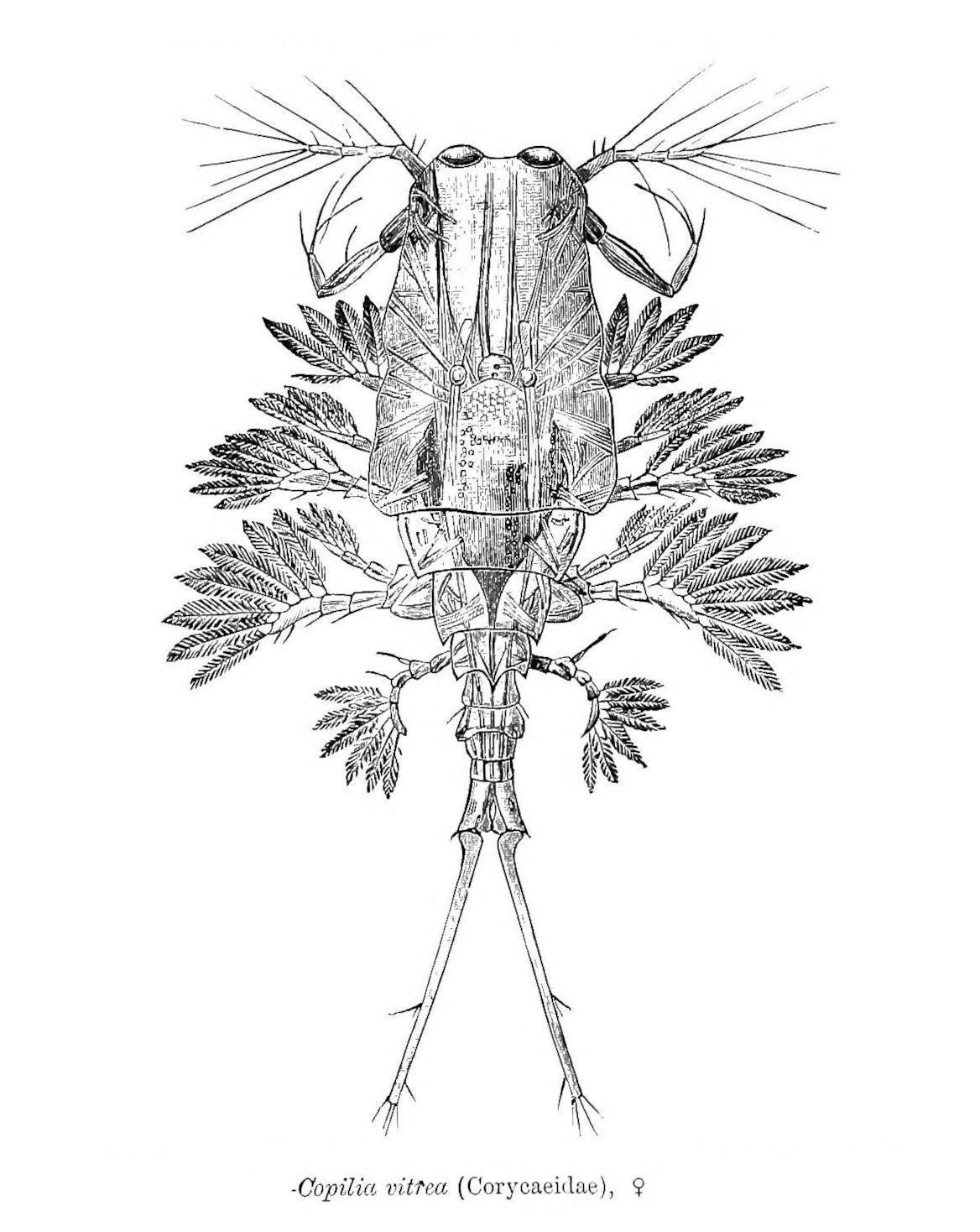
- Copilia vitrea

Scientific classification
- Kingdom: Animalia
- Phylum: Arthropoda
- Class: Copepoda
- Order: Cyclopoida
- Family: Sapphirinidae
- Genus: Copilia; Dana, 1849

Species
- See text

= Copilia =

Genus of crustaceans

Copilia is a genus of copepods in the family Sapphirinidae. The eyes in members of this genus have two lenses, arranged like those in a telescope.

== Species ==
The genus Copilia contains the following species:

- Copilia asiaticus (F. Dahl, 1894)
- Copilia atlantica Lubbock, 1856
- Copilia brucii Thompson, 1888
- Copilia denticulata Claus, 1863
- Copilia elliptica Giesbrecht, 1891
- Copilia fultoni T. Scott, 1894
- Copilia hendorffi F. Dahl, 1894
- Copilia lata Giesbrecht, 1891
- Copilia longistylis Mori, 1933
- Copilia mediterranea (Claus, 1863)
- Copilia mirabilis Dana, 1852
- Copilia nicaeensis Leuckart, 1859
- Copilia oblonga Giesbrecht, 1891
- Copilia pellucida (Haeckel, 1864)
- Copilia quadrata Dana, 1849
- Copilia recta Giesbrecht, 1891
- Copilia vitrea (Haeckel, 1864)
