= Frăția =

Frăția or Fratia may refer to:

- Frăția (union), a Romanian union that merged into the National Confederation of Free Trade Unions of Romania – Brotherhood
- Frăția (secret society), active in Romania in the 1840s
- Fratia (crustacean), a genus of crustaceans in the family Fratiidae

== See also ==
- Înfrățirea (disambiguation)
