= Procolobomatus =

Scientific classification
- Domain: Eukaryota
- Kingdom: Animalia
- Phylum: Arthropoda
- Class: Copepoda
- Order: Cyclopoida
- Family: Philichthyidae
- Genus: Procolobomatus; Castro-Romero, 1994

Genus of crustaceans

Procolobomatus is a genus of copepods, containing the following species:

- Procolobomatus hemilutjani Castro-Romero, 1994
- Procolobomatus hoi Madinabeitia & Iwasaki, 2013
- Procolobomatus kyphosus (Sekerak, 1970)
