= Kelleria portiviva =

Scientific classification
- Kingdom: Animalia
- Phylum: Arthropoda
- Clade: Pancrustacea
- Class: Copepoda
- Order: Cyclopoida
- Family: Kelleriidae
- Genus: Kelleria
- Species: K. portiviva

Binomial name
- Kelleria portiviva Kim I.H., 2006

Species of copepod

Kelleria portiviva is a species of copepod, endemic to Korea, and was first described in 2006 by Il-Hoi Kim.

== Distribution & habitat ==
This marine species is found on Jeju Island, Korea in the intertidal and low-tide zones in mud and gravel and in the burrows of invertebrates (mostly polychaetes and crustaceans).
