= Arthurius =

Scientific classification
- Kingdom: Animalia
- Phylum: Arthropoda
- Class: Copepoda
- Order: Cyclopoida
- Family: Splanchnotrophidae
- Genus: Arthurius; Huys, 2001

Genus of crustaceans

Arthurius is a genus of endoparasitic copepods in the family Splanchnotrophidae. These species are found in elysian sacoglossan sea slugs. It contains the following species:

- Arthurius bunakenensis Salmen, Kaligis, Mamangkey & Schrödl, 2008
- Arthurius elysiae (Jensen, 1990)
- Arthurius gibbosa Anton, Schories, Jörger, Kaligis & Schrödl, 2016
