= Abrsia =

Scientific classification
- Kingdom: Animalia
- Phylum: Arthropoda
- Class: Copepoda
- Order: Cyclopoida
- Familt: Abrsiidae
- Genus: Abrsia; Karanovic, 2008

Type species
- Abrsia misophrioides Karanovic, 2008

Genus of crustaceans

Abrsia is a genus of cyclopoid copepods in the order Cyclopoida. The genus is monotypic, consisting only of the species, Abrsia misophrioides.

The genus and the species were first described in 2008 by Tomislav Karanovic.
