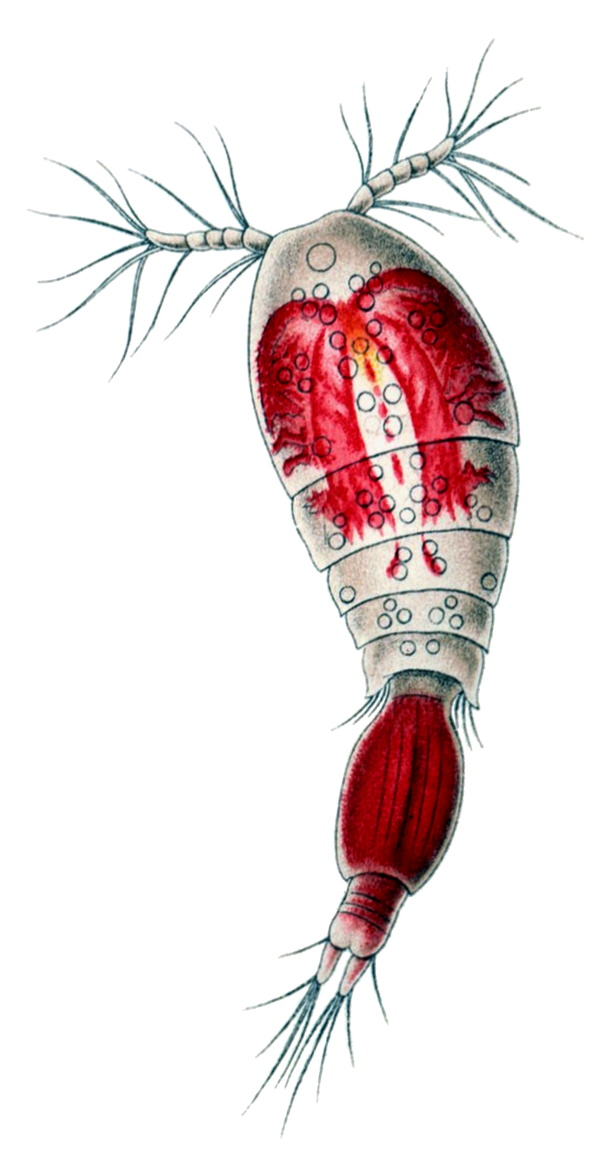
- Male Oncaea venusta

Scientific classification
- Kingdom: Animalia
- Phylum: Arthropoda
- Clade: Pancrustacea
- Class: Copepoda
- Order: Cyclopoida
- Family: Oncaeidae
- Genus: Oncaea; Philippi, 1843

Synonyms
- Antaria Dana, 1846; Myspictosum Kazachenko & Avdeev, 1977

= Oncaea =

Genus of crustaceans

Oncaea is a genus of copepods. The genus contains bioluminescent species. Unlike other bioluminescent copepods, Oncaea have an internal (non-secreted) bioluminescence. Oncaea contains the following species:

- Oncaea africana Shmeleva, 1979
- Oncaea alboranica Shmeleva, 1979
- Oncaea atlantica Shmeleva, 1967
- Oncaea bispinosa Böttger-Schnack, 2002
- Oncaea bowmani Heron, 1977
- Oncaea brocha Heron, 1977
- Oncaea brodskii Shmeleva, 1968
- Oncaea clevei Früchtl, 1923
- Oncaea compacta Heron, 1977
- Oncaea convexa Heron, 1977
- Oncaea cristata Böttger-Schnack, 2005
- Oncaea crypta Böttger-Schnack, 2005
- Oncaea curta G. O. Sars, 1916
- Oncaea curvata Giesbrecht, 1902
- Oncaea damkaeri Heron, 1977
- Oncaea delicata Heron, English & Damkaer, 1984
- Oncaea englishi Heron, 1977
- Oncaea furnestini Shmeleva, 1979
- Oncaea glabra Heron & Frost, 2000
- Oncaea grossa Heron & Frost, 2000
- Oncaea heronae Malt, 1982
- Oncaea illgi Heron, 1977
- Oncaea infantula K. T. Gordeeva, 1972
- Oncaea insolita Heron & Frost, 2000
- Oncaea lacinia Heron, English & Damkaer, 1984
- Oncaea latimana K. T. Gordeeva, 1975
- Oncaea longipes Shmeleva, 1968
- Oncaea longiseta Shmeleva, 1968
- Oncaea macilenta Heron, 1977
- Oncaea media Giesbrecht, 1891
- Oncaea mediterranea (Claus, 1863)
- Oncaea memorata K. T. Gordeeva, 1973
- Oncaea minima Shmeleva, 1968
- Oncaea minor Shmeleva, 1979
- Oncaea mollicula K. T. Gordeeva, 1975
- Oncaea notopus Giesbrecht, 1891
- Oncaea oceanica K. T. Gordeeva, 1972
- Oncaea olsoni Heron, 1977
- Oncaea ornata Giesbrecht, 1891
- Oncaea ovalis Shmeleva, 1966
- Oncaea parabathyalis Böttger-Schnack, 2005
- Oncaea paraclevei Böttger-Schnack, 2001
- Oncaea parila Heron, 1977
- Oncaea petila Heron, 1977
- Oncaea philippinensis (Kazachenko & Avdeev, 1977)
- Oncaea platysetosa Boxshall & Böttger, 1987
- Oncaea prendeli Shmeleva, 1966
- Oncaea prolata Heron, 1977
- Oncaea pumilis Heron, 1977
- Oncaea rimula Heron & Frost, 2000
- Oncaea rotata Heron & Frost, 2000
- Oncaea rotunda Heron, 1977
- Oncaea rotundata Boxshall, 1977
- Oncaea scottodicarloi Heron & Bradford-Grieve, 1995
- Oncaea setosa Heron, 1977
- Oncaea shmelevi K. T. Gordeeva, 1972
- Oncaea tenella G. O. Sars, 1916
- Oncaea tenuimana Giesbrecht, 1891
- Oncaea tregoubovi Shmeleva, 1968
- Oncaea venusta Philippi, 1843
- Oncaea vodjanitskii Shmeleva & Delalo, 1965
- Oncaea waldemari Bersano & Boxshall, 1996
- Oncaea walleni Heron, 1977
- Oncaea zernovi Shmeleva, 1966

A number of nomina dubia and species inquirendae have also been described in Oncaea:

Nomina dubia

- Oncaea neobscura Razouls, 1969
- Oncaea obscura Farran, 1908
- Oncaea parobscura Shmeleva, 1979

Species inquirendae

- Oncaea bathyalis Shmeleva, 1968
- Oncaea crassimana (Dana, 1849)
- Oncaea frosti Heron, 2002
- Oncaea gracilis (Dana, 1852)
- Oncaea obtusa (Dana, 1852)
