= Abrsiidae =

Scientific classification
- Kingdom: Animalia
- Phylum: Arthropoda
- Class: Copepoda
- Order: Cyclopoida
- Suborder: Ergasilida
- Family: Abrsiidae; Karanovic, 2008

Type species
- Abrsia misophrioides Karanovic, 2008

Family of crustaceans

Abrsiidae is a family of cyclopoid copepods in the order Cyclopoida. The family currently (2026) consists of the monotypic genus, Abrsia, and the species, Abrsia misophrioides.

The family, the genus and the species were first described in 2008 by Tomislav Karanovic.
