= Cyclopicina =

Scientific classification
- Domain: Eukaryota
- Kingdom: Animalia
- Phylum: Arthropoda
- Class: Copepoda
- Order: Cyclopoida
- Suborder: Cyclopicinida; Khodami, Mercado-Salas, Tang & Matrinez Arbizu, 2019
- Family: Cyclopicinidae; Khodami, Vaun MacArthur, Blanco-Bercial & Martinez Arbizu, 2017
- Genus: Cyclopicina; Lindberg, 1953

Species
- See text

Genus of copepods

Cyclopicina is a genus of copepods in the order Cyclopoida.

Species:

- Cyclopicina longifurcata (Scott T., 1901)
- Cyclopicina sirenkoi Martínez Arbizu, 1997
- Cyclopicina toyoshioae Ohtsuka, Tanaka & Boxshall, 2016
