= Mesoglicola =

Scientific classification
- Domain: Eukaryota
- Kingdom: Animalia
- Phylum: Arthropoda
- Class: Copepoda
- Order: Cyclopoida
- Family: Mesoglicolidae
- Genus: Mesoglicola; Quidor, 1906
- Species: M. delagei

Binomial name
- Mesoglicola delagei Quidor, 1906

Genus of crustaceans

Mesoglicola is a monotypic genus of crustaceans belonging to the monotypic family Mesoglicolidae. The only species is Mesoglicola delagei.

The species is found in Western Europe.
