= Ventriculinidae =

Scientific classification
- Domain: Eukaryota
- Kingdom: Animalia
- Phylum: Arthropoda
- Class: Copepoda
- Order: Cyclopoida
- Suborder: Ergasilida
- Family: Ventriculinidae

Family of crustaceans

Ventriculinidae is a family of cyclopoid copepods in the order Cyclopoida. There are at least two genera and three described species in Ventriculinidae.

== Genera ==
These two genera belong to the family Ventriculinidae:

- Heliogabalus Leigh-Sharpe, 1934
- Ventriculina Bassett-Smith, 1903
