= Gastrodelphyidae =

Scientific classification
- Kingdom: Animalia
- Phylum: Arthropoda
- Clade: Pancrustacea
- Class: Copepoda
- Order: Cyclopoida
- Suborder: Ergasilida
- Family: Gastrodelphyidae; List, 1889

Genera
- Chonephilus M. Sars, 1861; Gastrodelphys Graeffe, 1883; Sabellacheres M. Sars, 1861

Family of crustaceans

Gastrodelphyidae is a family of parasitic copepods.

== Genera ==
The family contains three genera:

- Chonephilus Sars M., 1861
- Gastrodelphys Graeffe, 1883
- Sabellacheres Sars M., 1862
