= Notodelphyidae =

Scientific classification
- Kingdom: Animalia
- Phylum: Arthropoda
- Clade: Pancrustacea
- Class: Copepoda
- Order: Cyclopoida
- Suborder: Oithonida
- Family: Notodelphyidae

Family of crustaceans

Notodelphyidae is a family of copepods belonging to the order Cyclopoida.

== Genera ==
Genera:

- Achelidelphys Lafargue & Laubier, 1977
- Adenaplostoma Stock, 1993
- Anoplodelphys Lafargue & Laubier, 1978
