= Mantridae =

Scientific classification
- Domain: Eukaryota
- Kingdom: Animalia
- Phylum: Arthropoda
- Class: Copepoda
- Order: Cyclopoida
- Suborder: Oithonida
- Family: Mantridae

Genus of crustaceans

Mantridae is a family of crustaceans belonging to the order Cyclopoida.

Genera:

- Chamicola Ohtsuka, Boxshall & Torigoe, 2000
- Mantra Leigh-Sharpe, 1934
- Nearchinotodelphys Ummerkutty, 1961
