= Synapticolidae =

Scientific classification
- Domain: Eukaryota
- Kingdom: Animalia
- Phylum: Arthropoda
- Class: Copepoda
- Order: Cyclopoida
- Suborder: Ergasilida
- Family: Synapticolidae

Family of crustaceans

Synapticolidae is a family of cyclopoid copepods in the order Cyclopoida. There are about 11 genera and at least 50 described species in Synapticolidae. Characteristics of this family include the expression of body segments in both sexes, well-developed swimming legs, and a tapering mandible with toothed margins.

== Genera ==
These 11 genera belong to the family Synapticolidae:

- Calypsarion H.o.Humes, 1969
- Calypsina Humes & Stock, 1972
- Calysion
- Caribulus Humes & Stock, 1972
- Chauliolobion Humes, 1975
- Lecanthurius
- Lecanurius Kossmann, 1877
- Lichothuria Stock, 1968
- Meomicola Stock, Humes & Gooding, 1963
- Scambicornus Heegaard, 1944
- Synapticola Voigt, 1892
