= Macrochironidae =

Scientific classification
- Kingdom: Animalia
- Phylum: Arthropoda
- Class: Copepoda
- Order: Cyclopoida
- Suborder: Ergasilida
- Family: Macrochironidae

Family of crustaceans

Macrochironidae is a family of copepods belonging to the order Cyclopoida.

Genera:

- Macrochiron Brady, 1872
- Oncaeola Kramer, 1895
- Paramacrochiron Sewell, 1949
- Pseudomacrochiron Reddiah, 1969
- Sewellochiron Humes, 1969
