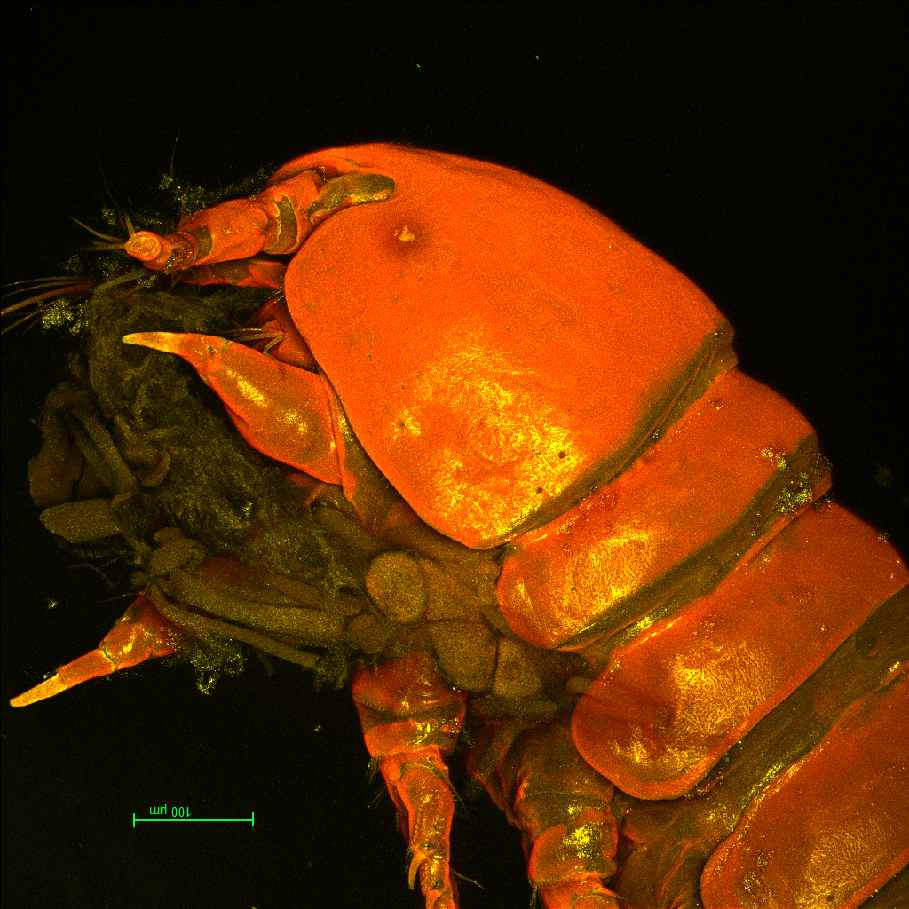
- Lateral view of Erebonasteridae-See food of animal origin

Scientific classification
- Domain: Eukaryota
- Kingdom: Animalia
- Phylum: Arthropoda
- Class: Copepoda
- Order: Cyclopoida
- Suborder: Ergasilida
- Family: Erebonasteridae

= Erebonasteridae =

Family of crustaceans

Erebonasteridae is a family of crustaceans belonging to the order Cyclopoida.

Genera:

- Ambilimbus Ivanenko, Defaye & Huys, 2005
- Centobnaster Huys & Boxshall, 1990
- Erebonaster Humes, 1987
- Nansennaster Martínez Arbizu, 1999
- Tychidion Humes, 1973
