= Philoblennidae =

Scientific classification
- Domain: Eukaryota
- Kingdom: Animalia
- Phylum: Arthropoda
- Class: Copepoda
- Order: Cyclopoida
- Suborder: Ergasilida
- Family: Philoblennidae

Family of crustaceans

Philoblennidae is a family of crustaceans belonging to the order Cyclopoida.

Genera:

- Briarella Bergh, 1876
- Chondrocarpus Bassett-Smith, 1903
- Myzotheridion Laubier & Bouchet, 1976
- Nippoparasitus Uyeno, Ogasaka & Nagasawa, 2016
- Philoblenna Izawa, 1976
