= Corycaeidae =

Scientific classification
- Domain: Eukaryota
- Kingdom: Animalia
- Phylum: Arthropoda
- Class: Copepoda
- Order: Cyclopoida
- Suborder: Ergasilida
- Family: Corycaeidae

Family of crustaceans

Corycaeidae is a family of cyclopoid copepods in the order Cyclopoida. There are about 10 genera and more than 70 described species in Corycaeidae.

== Genera ==
These 10 genera belong to the family Corycaeidae:

- Agetus Krøyer, 1849
- Corycaeus Dana, 1846
- Ditrichocorycaeus Dahl M., 1912
- Farranula C. B. Wilson, 1932
- Monocorycaeus Dahl M., 1912
- Monocoryceus
- Onchocorycaeus Dahl M., 1912
- Onychocorycaeus Dahl M., 1912
- Urocorycaeus Dahl, 1912
- Urocoryceus
