= Nereicolidae =

Scientific classification
- Domain: Eukaryota
- Kingdom: Animalia
- Phylum: Arthropoda
- Class: Copepoda
- Order: Cyclopoida
- Suborder: Ergasilida
- Family: Nereicolidae

Family of crustaceans

Nereicolidae is a family of crustaceans belonging to the order Cyclopoida.

Genera:

- Anomopsyllus Sars, 1921
- Chelonidiformis Hesse, 1869
- Nereicola Keferstein, 1863
- Pherma Wilson, 1923
- Selioides Levinsen, 1878
- Selius Krøyer, 1837
- Sigecheres Bresciani, 1964
- Vectoriella Stock, 1968
