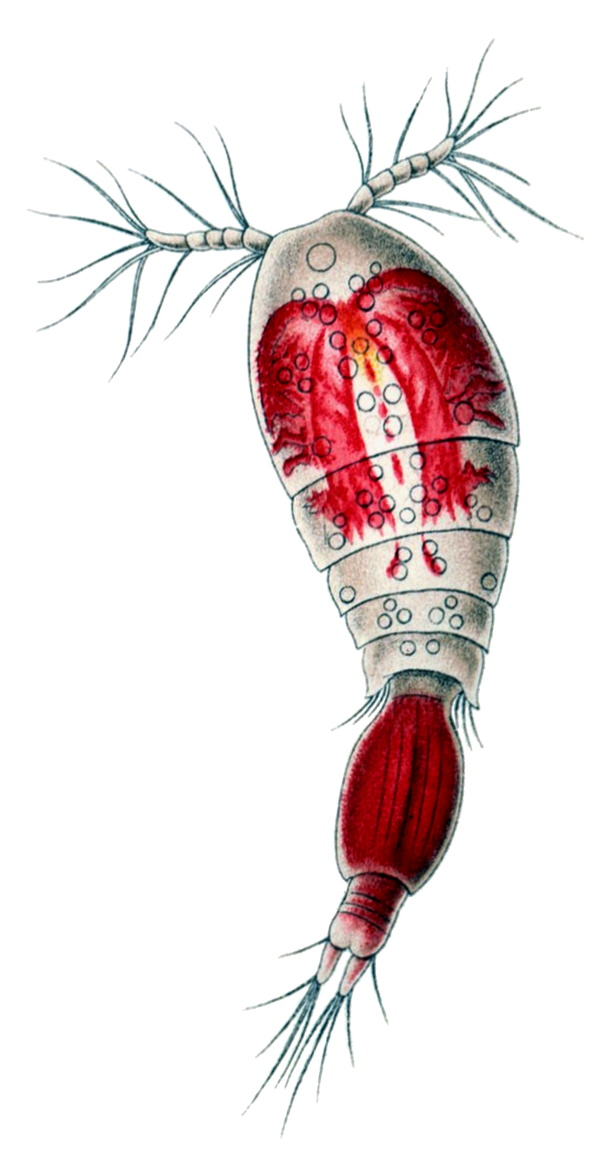

Scientific classification
- Domain: Eukaryota
- Kingdom: Animalia
- Phylum: Arthropoda
- Class: Copepoda
- Order: Cyclopoida
- Family: Oncaeidae
- Genus: Oncaea
- Species: O. venusta

Binomial name
- Oncaea venusta Philippi, 1843

= Oncaea venusta =

Species of crustacean

Oncaea venusta is a species of copepod with a cosmopolitan distribution, but lacking from the Arctic Ocean. Females are 1.1–1.3 mm (0.043–0.051 in) long, while males are only 0.8–1.0 mm (0.031–0.039 in) long. The front of the head is unusually wide, and the body is brightly coloured, usually yellow–orange, but sometimes red. O. venusta feeds on a variety of zooplankton and phytoplankton.
