= Cucumaricola =

Scientific classification
- Domain: Eukaryota
- Kingdom: Animalia
- Phylum: Arthropoda
- Class: Copepoda
- Order: Cyclopoida
- Family: Cucumaricolidae
- Genus: Cucumaricola; Paterson, 1958

Genus of crustaceans

Cucumaricola is a genus of crustaceans belonging to the monotypic family Cucumaricolidae.

The species of this genus are found in Malesia.

Species:

- Cucumaricola curvatus Avdeev, 1977
- Cucumaricola notabilis Paterson, 1958
