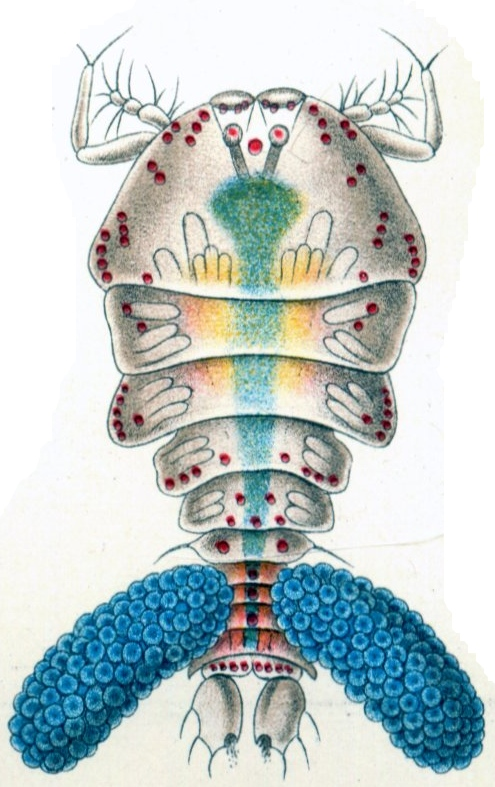
- Sapphirina darwinii with egg cases

Scientific classification
- Kingdom: Animalia
- Phylum: Arthropoda
- Clade: Pancrustacea
- Class: Copepoda
- Order: Cyclopoida
- Suborder: Ergasilida
- Family: Sapphirinidae; Thorell, 1859

Genera
- See text

= Sapphirinidae =

Family of crustaceans

Sapphirinidae is a family of parasitic copepods in the order Cyclopoida.

== Description ==
Males come in a variety of bright and flashy colors. In contrast, the females are transparent. The reason for this sexual dimorphism is that males need to attract the attention of females in order to mate.

== Genera ==
The family Sapphirinidae consists of the following genera:

- Copilia Dana, 1849
- Sapphirina J. Thompson, 1830
- Vettoria C. B. Wilson, 1924
