= Pseudanthessiidae =

Scientific classification
- Domain: Eukaryota
- Kingdom: Animalia
- Phylum: Arthropoda
- Class: Copepoda
- Order: Cyclopoida
- Suborder: Ergasilida
- Family: Pseudanthessiidae

Family of crustaceans

Pseudanthessiidae is a family of cyclopoid copepods in the order Cyclopoida. There are about 7 genera and more than 60 described species in Pseudanthessiidae.

== Genera ==
These seven genera belong to the family Pseudanthessiidae:

- Mecomerinx Humes, 1977
- Pseudanthessius Claus, 1889
- Senariellus Humes, 1977
- Sipadania Humes & Lane, 1993
- Spidadania
- Spiranthessius Stock, 1995
- Tubiporicola Kim I.H., 2009
