= Micrallecto =

Scientific classification
- Domain: Eukaryota
- Kingdom: Animalia
- Phylum: Arthropoda
- Class: Copepoda
- Order: Cyclopoida
- Family: Micrallectidae
- Genus: Micrallecto; Stock, 1971

Genus of crustaceans

Micrallecto is a genus of crustaceans belonging to the monotypic family Micrallectidae.

Species:

- Micrallecto fusii (Stock, 1973)
- Micrallecto uncinata Stock, 1971
