= Înfrățirea =

Înfrăţirea may refer to several villages in Romania:

- Înfrăţirea, a village in Dor Mărunt Commune, Călăraşi County
- Înfrăţirea, a village in Bulzești Commune, Dolj County

== See also ==
- Frăția (disambiguation)
