= Serpulidicolidae =

Scientific classification
- Domain: Eukaryota
- Kingdom: Animalia
- Phylum: Arthropoda
- Class: Copepoda
- Order: Cyclopoida
- Suborder: Ergasilida
- Family: Serpulidicolidae

Family of crustaceans

Serpulidicolidae is a family of crustaceans belonging to the order Cyclopoida.

Genera:

- Abyssotaurus Brenke, Fanenbruck & George, 2018
- Parangium Humes, 1985
- Rhabdopus Southward, 1964
- Rhynchopus Stock, 1979
- Serpulidicola Southward, 1964
- Serpulidicoloides Boxshall & Halsey, 2004
