= Enteropsidae =

Scientific classification
- Domain: Eukaryota
- Kingdom: Animalia
- Phylum: Arthropoda
- Class: Copepoda
- Order: Cyclopoida
- Suborder: Cyclopida
- Family: Enteropsidae

Family of crustaceans

Enteropsidae is a family of copepods belonging to the order Cyclopoida.

Genera:

- Enterocola van Beneden, 1860
- Enterocolides Chatton & Harant, 1922
- Enteropsis Aurivillius, 1885
- Lequerrea Chatton & Harant, 1924
- Mychophilus Hesse, 1865
- Mycophilus Hesse, 1865
