= Chitonophilidae =

Scientific classification
- Kingdom: Animalia
- Phylum: Arthropoda
- Clade: Pancrustacea
- Class: Copepoda
- Order: Cyclopoida
- Suborder: Oithonida
- Family: Chitonophilidae; Avdeev & Sirenko, 1991

Family of crustaceans

The Chitonophilidae are a family of parasitic copepods, with these genera:

- Chitonophilus Avdeev & Sirenko, 1991
- Cocculinika Jones & Marshall, 1986
- Cookoides Avdeev & Sirenko, 1994
- Ischnochitonika Franz & Bullock, 1990
- Lepetellicola Huys, Lopez-Gonzalez, Roldan & Luque, 2002
- Leptochitonicola Avdeev & Sirenko, 1991
- Leptochitonoides Avdeev & Sirenko, 2005
- Nucellicola Lamb, Boxshall, Mill & Grahame, 1996
- Tesonesma Avdeev & Sirenko, 1994
