= Xenocoelomatidae =

Scientific classification
- Domain: Eukaryota
- Kingdom: Animalia
- Phylum: Arthropoda
- Class: Copepoda
- Order: Cyclopoida
- Suborder: Ergasilida
- Family: Xenocoelomatidae

Family of crustaceans

Xenocoelomatidae is a family of cyclopoid copepods in the order Cyclopoida. There are at least two genera and four described species in Xenocoelomatidae.

== Genera ==
These two genera belong to the family Xenocoelomatidae:

- Aphanodomus C. B. Wilson, 1924
- Xenocoeloma Caullery & Mesnil, 1915
