= Archinotodelphyidae =

Scientific classification
- Domain: Eukaryota
- Kingdom: Animalia
- Phylum: Arthropoda
- Class: Copepoda
- Order: Cyclopoida
- Suborder: Oithonida
- Family: Archinotodelphyidae

Family of crustaceans

Archinotodelphyidae is a family of copepods belonging to the order Cyclopoida.

Genera:

- Archinotodelphys Lang, 1949
- Pararchinotodelphys Lang, 1949
