= Acantholochus =

Scientific classification
- Kingdom: Animalia
- Phylum: Arthropoda
- Class: Copepoda
- Order: Cyclopoida
- Family: Bomolochidae
- Genus: Acantholochus; Cressey, 1984

Genus of crustaceans

Acantholochus is a genus of parasitic copepods belonging to the family Bomolochidae. Its members can only be distinguished from the closely related genus Hamaticolax by the absence of an accessory process on the claw of the maxillipeds.

== Species ==
It includes the following species:

- Acantholochus albidus (Wilson, 1932)
- Acantholochus asperatus (Cressey & Cressey, 1980)
- Acantholochus australiensis (Byrnes, 1986)
- Acantholochus crevalleus (Cressey, 1981)
- Acantholochus divaricatus (Cressey & Cressey, 1980)
- Acantholochus nasus Cressey, 1984
- Acantholochus nudiusculus (Cressey & Cressey, 1980)
- Acantholochus venustus (Kabata, 1971)
- Acantholochus zairae Morales-Serna & Gómez, 2010

The following species were formerly included in Acantholochus but are now placed in Hamaticolax:

- Hamaticolax galeichthyos (Luque & Bruno, 1990)
- Hamaticolax paralabracis (Luque & Bruno, 1990)
- Hamaticolax unisagittatus (Tavares & Luque, 2003)
