= Spiophanicola =

Scientific classification
- Kingdom: Animalia
- Phylum: Arthropoda
- Class: Copepoda
- Order: Cyclopoida
- Suborder: Ergasilida
- Family: Spiophanicolidae
- Genus: Spiophanicola; Ho, 1984

Genus of crustaceans

Spiophanicola is a genus of cyclopoid copepods in the family Spiophanicolidae, the sole genus of the family. There are at least two described species in Spiophanicola.

== Species ==
These two species belong to the genus Spiophanicola:

- Spiophanicola atlanticus Kim I.H., Sikorski, O'Reilly & Boxshall, 2013
- Spiophanicola spinosus Ho, 1984
