= Ozmana =

Scientific classification
- Domain: Eukaryota
- Kingdom: Animalia
- Phylum: Arthropoda
- Class: Copepoda
- Order: Cyclopoida
- Family: Ozmanidae
- Genus: Ozmana; Ho & Thatcher, 1989

Genus of crustaceans

Ozmana is a genus of crustaceans belonging to the monotypic family Ozmanidae.

The species of this genus are found in Southern America.

Species:

- Ozmana haemophila Ho & Thatcher, 1989
- Ozmana huarpium Gamarra-Luques, Vega, Koch & Castro-Vazquez, 2004
