= Herpyllobiidae =

Scientific classification
- Domain: Eukaryota
- Kingdom: Animalia
- Phylum: Arthropoda
- Class: Copepoda
- Order: Cyclopoida
- Suborder: Ergasilida
- Family: Herpyllobiidae

Family of crustaceans

Herpyllobiidae is a family of cyclopoid copepods in the order Cyclopoida. There are about 6 genera and more than 20 described species in Herpyllobiidae.

== Genera ==
These six genera belong to the family Herpyllobiidae:

- Eurysilenium M. Sars, 1870
- Gottoniella López-González, Bresciani & Conradi, 2006
- Hedyphanella
- Herpyllobius Steenstrup & Lütken, 1861
- Phallusiella Leigh-Sharpe, 1926
- Thylacoides Gravier, 1912
