= Telson (copepod) =

Scientific classification
- Domain: Eukaryota
- Kingdom: Animalia
- Phylum: Arthropoda
- Class: Copepoda
- Order: Cyclopoida
- Family: Telsidae
- Genus: Telson; Pearse, 1952

Genus of crustaceans

Telson is a genus of cyclopoid copepods in the family Telsidae. There are at least two described species in Telson.

== Species ==
These two species belong to the genus Telson:

- Telson elongatus Pearse, 1952
- Telson nicholsi Causey, 1960
