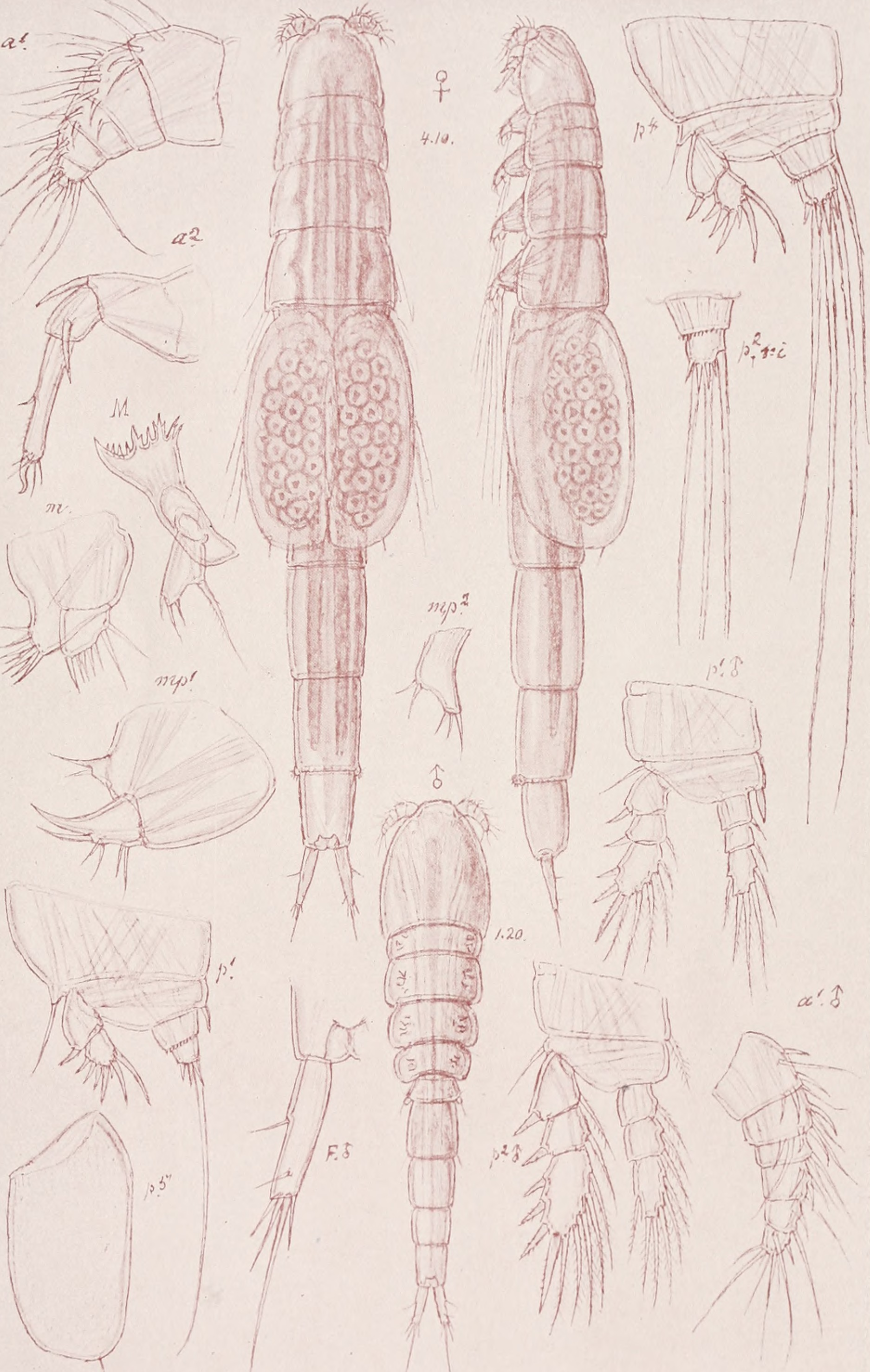

Scientific classification
- Domain: Eukaryota
- Kingdom: Animalia
- Phylum: Arthropoda
- Class: Copepoda
- Order: Cyclopoida
- Suborder: Cyclopida
- Family: Ascidicolidae

= Ascidicolidae =

Family of crustaceans

Ascidicolidae is a family of copepods belonging to the order Cyclopoida.

Genera:

- Aplopodus Hesse, 1869
- Ascidicola Thorell, 1859
- Ceratrichodes Hesse, 1866
- Hypnoticus Wilson, 1924
- Lygephile Hesse, 1865
- Lygephilus Hesse, 1865
- Narcodina Wilson, 1924
- Podolabis Hesse, 1864
- Polyoon Hesse, 1878
- Styelicola Lützen, 1968
