= Buproridae =

Scientific classification
- Domain: Eukaryota
- Kingdom: Animalia
- Phylum: Arthropoda
- Class: Copepoda
- Order: Cyclopoida
- Suborder: Cyclopida
- Family: Buproridae; Thorell, 1859

Family of crustaceans

Buproridae is a family of crustaceans belonging to the order Cyclopoida.

Genera:

- Buprorides Kim & Boxshall, 2021
- Buprorus Thorell, 1859
