= Saccopsidae =

Scientific classification
- Domain: Eukaryota
- Kingdom: Animalia
- Phylum: Arthropoda
- Class: Copepoda
- Order: Cyclopoida
- Suborder: Ergasilida
- Family: Saccopsidae

Synonyms
- Melinnacheridae

Family of crustaceans

Saccopsidae is a family of copepods belonging to the order Cyclopoida.

Genera:

- Euchonicola Boxshall, O'Reilly, Sikorski & Summerfield, 2019
- Euchonicoloides Boxshall, O'Reilly, Sikorski & Summerfield, 2019
- Lanassicola Boxshall, O'Reilly, Sikorski & Summerfield, 2019
- Melinnacheres Sars, 1870
- Trichobranchicola Boxshall, O'Reilly, Sikorski & Summerfield, 2019
