= Myicolidae =

Scientific classification
- Domain: Eukaryota
- Kingdom: Animalia
- Phylum: Arthropoda
- Class: Copepoda
- Order: Cyclopoida
- Suborder: Ergasilida
- Family: Myicolidae

Family of crustaceans

Myicolidae is a family of copepods belonging to the order Cyclopoida.

Genera:

- Conchocheres Sars, 1918
- Crucisoma Kabata, 1981
- Exostrincola Ho & Kim, 1992
- Myicola Wright, 1885
- Ostrincola Wilson, 1944
- Parostrincola Humes & Boxshall, 1988
- Pengna Ho & Kim, 1992
- Pseudomyicola Yamaguti, 1936
