= Echiurophilus =

Scientific classification
- Domain: Eukaryota
- Kingdom: Animalia
- Phylum: Arthropoda
- Class: Copepoda
- Order: Cyclopoida
- Suborder: Ergasilida
- Family: Echiurophilidae
- Genus: Echiurophilus; Delamare Deboutteville & Nunes-Ruivo, 1955

Genus of crustaceans

Echiurophilus is a genus of cyclopoid copepods in the family Echiurophilidae, the sole genus of the family. There are at least two described species in Echiurophilus.

== Species ==
These two species belong to the genus Echiurophilus:

- Echiurophilus fizeae Delamare Deboutteville & Nunes-Ruivo, 1955
- Echiurophilus fizei Delamare Deboutteville & Nunes-Ruivo, 1955
