= Octopicola =

Scientific classification
- Domain: Eukaryota
- Kingdom: Animalia
- Phylum: Arthropoda
- Class: Copepoda
- Order: Cyclopoida
- Family: Octopicolidae
- Genus: Octopicola; Humes, 1957

Genus of crustaceans

Octopicola is a genus of crustaceans belonging to the monotypic family Octopicolidae.

The genus has almost cosmopolitan distribution.

Species:

- Octopicola huanghaiensis Du, Dong & Sun, 2018
- Octopicola regalis Humes, 1974
- Octopicola stocki Humes, 1963
- Octopicola superba
