= Eunicicolidae =

Scientific classification
- Domain: Eukaryota
- Kingdom: Animalia
- Phylum: Arthropoda
- Class: Copepoda
- Order: Cyclopoida
- Suborder: Ergasilida
- Family: Eunicicolidae

Family of crustaceans

Eunicicolidae is a family of crustaceans belonging to the order Cyclopoida.

Genera:

- Eunicicola Kurz, 1877
- Spongicola Kim, 2005
