= Thamnomolgidae =

Scientific classification
- Domain: Eukaryota
- Kingdom: Animalia
- Phylum: Arthropoda
- Class: Copepoda
- Order: Cyclopoida
- Suborder: Ergasilida
- Family: Thamnomolgidae

Family of crustaceans

Thamnomolgidae is a family of cyclopoid copepods in the order Cyclopoida. There are at least three genera and four described species in Thamnomolgidae.

== Genera ==
These three genera belong to the family Thamnomolgidae:

- Camotesia Humes, 1990
- Forhania Humes, 1990
- Thamnomolgus Humes, 1969
