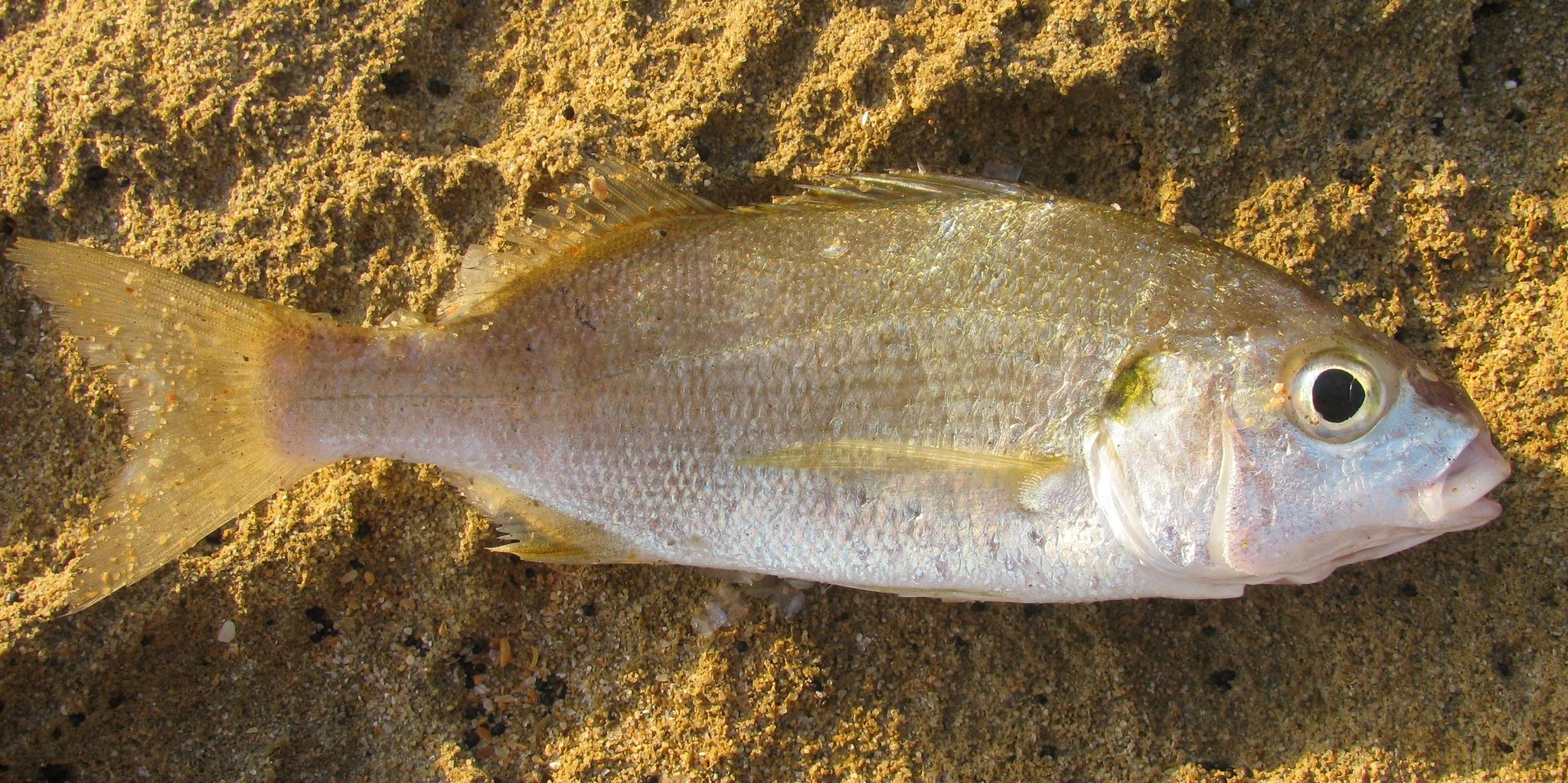

Conservation status
- Least Concern (IUCN 3.1)

Scientific classification
- Kingdom: Animalia
- Phylum: Chordata
- Class: Actinopterygii
- Division: Teleostei
- Order: Acanthuriformes
- Family: Haemulidae
- Genus: Pomadasys
- Species: P. olivaceus

Binomial name
- Pomadasys olivaceus (F. Day, 1875)

= Pomadasys olivaceus =

Species of fish

Pomadasys olivaceus, commonly named piggy, or pinky is a species of marine fish in the family Haemulidae, the grunts, first described by Francis Day in 1875 as Pristipoma olivaceum in Day, F. (1875), The fishes of India; being a natural history of the fishes known to inhabit the seas and fresh waters of India, Burma, and Ceylon. London. Part 1.

== Distribution ==
It is found on the south and east coasts of southern Africa from False Bay to Mozambique, and elsewhere in the western Indian Ocean, in coastal waters, on sand and reef to depths of 90 m (300 ft), including tidal estuaries.

== Description ==
Silvery body toning to olive on the back, and a dark blotch on the operculum behind the eye.
