= Urocopia =

Scientific classification
- Domain: Eukaryota
- Kingdom: Animalia
- Phylum: Arthropoda
- Class: Copepoda
- Order: Cyclopoida
- Suborder: Ergasilida
- Family: Urocopiidae
- Genus: Urocopia; Sars G.O., 1917

Genus of crustaceans

Urocopia is a genus of cyclopoid copepods in the family Urocopiidae, the sole genus of the family. There are at least three described species in Urocopia.

== Species ==
These three species belong to the genus Urocopia:

- Urocopia deeveyae (Boxshall, 1981)
- Urocopia moria (Olson, 1949)
- Urocopia singularis Sars G.O., 1917
