= Lamippidae =

Scientific classification
- Domain: Eukaryota
- Kingdom: Animalia
- Phylum: Arthropoda
- Class: Copepoda
- Order: Cyclopoida
- Suborder: Ergasilida
- Family: Lamippidae; Joliet, 1882

Family of crustaceans

Lamippidae is a family of copepods belonging to the order Cyclopoida.

Genera:

- Enalcyonium Olsson, 1869
- Gorgonophilus Buhl-Mortensen & Mortensen, 2004
- Isidicola Gravier, 1914
- Lamipella Bouligand & Delamare Deboutteville, 1959
- Lamippe Bruzelius, 1858
- Lamippella Bouligand & Delamare Deboutteville, 1959
- Lamippina Bouligand, 1960
- Lamippula Bouligand, 1966
- Linaresia Zulueta, 1908
- Magnippe Stock, 1978
- Ptilosarcoma Williams, Anchaluisa, Boyko & McDaniel, 2018
- Sphaerippe Grygier, 1980
