= Speleoithona =

Scientific classification
- Domain: Eukaryota
- Kingdom: Animalia
- Phylum: Arthropoda
- Class: Copepoda
- Order: Cyclopoida
- Suborder: Oithonida
- Family: Speleoithonidae; Rocha & Illife, 1991
- Genus: Speleoithona; Rocha & Iliffe, 1991

Genus of crustaceans

Speleoithona is a genus of copepods. It is the only genus in the family Speleoithonidae, containing the following species:

- Speleoithona bermudensis C. E. F. Rocha & Iliffe, 1993
- Speleoithona eleutherensis C. E. F. Rocha & Iliffe, 1991
- Speleoithona salvadorensis C. E. F. Rocha & Iliffe, 1991
