= Entobius =

Scientific classification
- Domain: Eukaryota
- Kingdom: Animalia
- Phylum: Arthropoda
- Class: Copepoda
- Order: Cyclopoida
- Family: Entobiidae
- Genus: Entobius; Dogiel, 1908

Genus of crustaceans

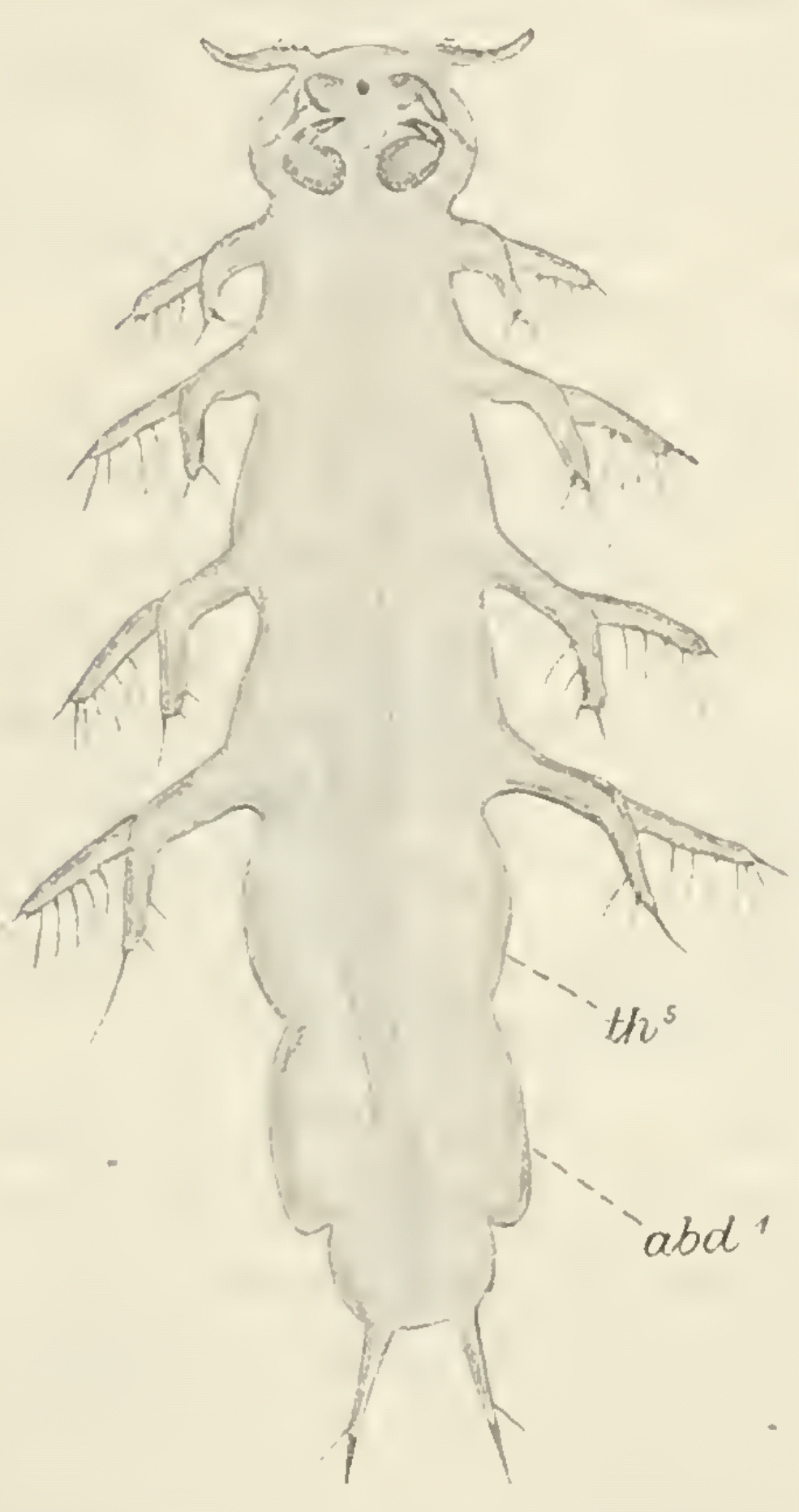
Drawing of Entobius loimiae by Dogiel, 1908

Entobius is a genus of crustaceans belonging to the monotypic family Entobiidae.

The species of this genus are found in Western Europe and Northern America.

Species:

- Entobius euelpis Barnard, 1948
- Entobius hamondi Gotto, 1966
- Entobius loimiae Dogiel, 1908
- Entobius scionides Suárez-Morales & Carrera-Parra, 2012
