= Vahiniidae =

Scientific classification
- Domain: Eukaryota
- Kingdom: Animalia
- Phylum: Arthropoda
- Class: Copepoda
- Order: Cyclopoida
- Suborder: Ergasilida
- Family: Vahiniidae

Family of crustaceans

Vahiniidae is a family of cyclopoid copepods in the order Cyclopoida. There are at least two genera and two described species in Vahiniidae.

== Genera ==
These two genera belong to the family Vahiniidae:

- Vahinia
- Vahinius Humes, 1967
