= Anomoclausia =

Scientific classification
- Domain: Eukaryota
- Kingdom: Animalia
- Phylum: Arthropoda
- Class: Copepoda
- Order: Cyclopoida
- Suborder: Ergasilida
- Family: Anomoclausiidae
- Genus: Anomoclausia; Gotto, 1964
- Species: A. indrehusae

Binomial name
- Anomoclausia indrehusae Gotto, 1964

Genus of crustaceans

Anomoclausia is a genus of cyclopoid copepods in the family Anomoclausiidae, the sole genus of the family. There is one described species in Anomoclausia, A. indrehusae.
