= Iveidae =

Scientific classification
- Domain: Eukaryota
- Kingdom: Animalia
- Phylum: Arthropoda
- Class: Copepoda
- Order: Cyclopoida
- Suborder: Ergasilida
- Family: Iveidae

Family of crustaceans

Iveidae is a family of copepods belonging to the order Cyclopoida.

Genera:

- Ive Mayer, 1879
- Ubius Kesteven, 1913
