= Chordeumiidae =

Scientific classification
- Domain: Eukaryota
- Kingdom: Animalia
- Phylum: Arthropoda
- Class: Copepoda
- Order: Cyclopoida
- Suborder: Oithonida
- Family: Chordeumiidae

Family of crustaceans

Chordeumiidae is a family of crustaceans belonging to the order Cyclopoida.

Genera:

- Arthrochordeumium Stephensen, 1918
- Chordeumium Stephensen, 1918
- Lernaeosaccus Heegaard, 1951
- Ophioicodes Heegaard, 1951
- Ophioika Stephensen, 1933
- Parachordeumium Calvez, 1938
