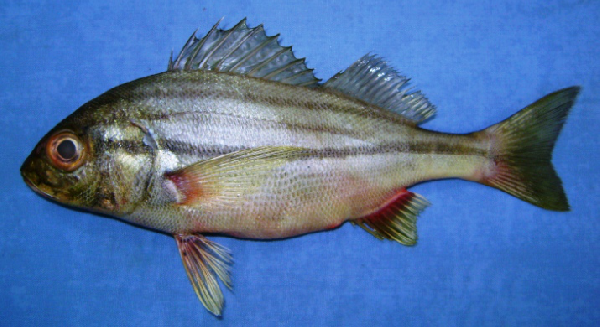

Conservation status
- Least Concern (IUCN 3.1)

Scientific classification
- Kingdom: Animalia
- Phylum: Chordata
- Class: Actinopterygii
- Order: Acanthuriformes
- Family: Haemulidae
- Genus: Pomadasys
- Species: P. stridens

Binomial name
- Pomadasys stridens (Forsskål, 1775)

Synonyms
- Sciaena stridens Forsskål, 1775; Rhonciscus stridens (Forsskål, 1775)

= Pomadasys stridens =

Species of fish

Pomadasys stridens, the striped piggy or lined piggy, is a grunt from the western Indian Ocean and is one of a group of Indo-Pacific marine species which have colonised the Mediterranean Sea through the Suez Canal from the Red Sea, a process known as Lessepsian migration.

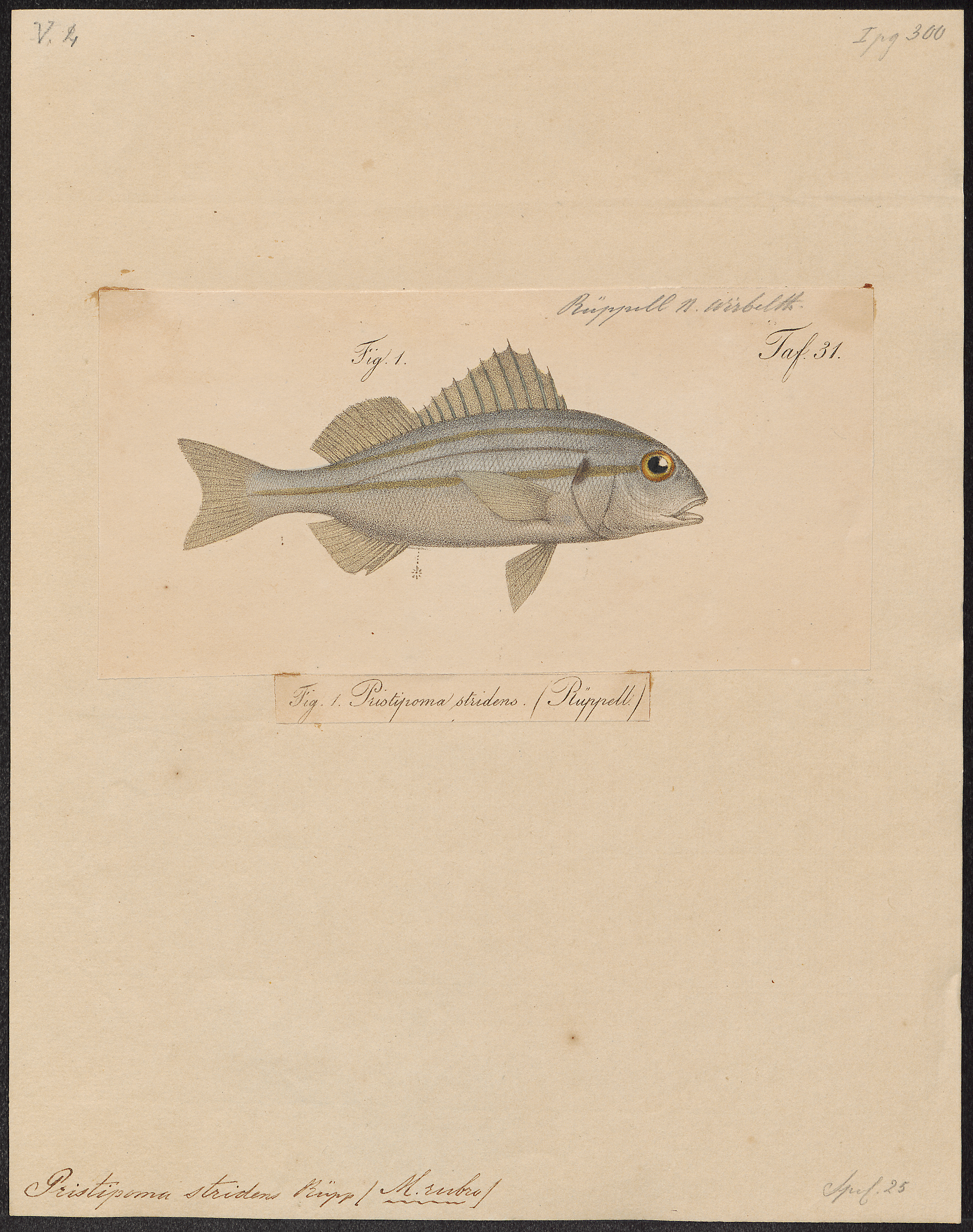
Pristipoma stridens - 1835 - Print - Iconographia Zoologica - Special Collections University of Amsterdam - UBA01 IZ13000144

== Description ==
Pomadasys stridens has a silvery body which is slightly darker dorsally than it is ventrally. It has 3-4 golden-brown stripes along its body, merging towards the caudal peduncle, and a dark blotch on the operculum. It has a relatively large head with a small, slightly oblique mouth and two pores on the tip of the chin which lie in front of a short indentation. It has 12 spines and 13–14 soft rays in the dorsal fin with 3 spines and 3 soft rays in the anal fin. It grows up to 23 cm standard length but averages 10 cm, with females normally growing to a slightly larger size than males.

== Distribution ==
Pomadasys stridens is indigenous to the western Indian Ocean from the Red Sea south along the eastern African coast to South Africa, east to the western coast of India, including the Persian Gulf, Lakshadweep archipelago and the Maldives; it is also found off Madagascar, the Seychelles and Mascarene islands. Recorded for the first time in the Mediterranean in 1969 in the Gulf of Genoa, it was later found in the Bardawil Lagoon in Egypt and extended north in Levantine waters with a known population off İskenderun, Turkey.

== Habitat ==
Pomadasys stridens is found in waters over sandy and muddy substrates down to a depth of 55m, but has been associated with reefs and with rocky tidal pools.

== Biology ==
Pomadasys stridens spawns between December and March in the Persian Gulf, while in the Mediterranean it takes place during the summer, and the fish form pairs during spawning. It is a carnivorous species and the crustaceans, molluscs, small fish and polychaete worms make up the majority of its diet. It is a social species and fish in larger groups fed better than those in smaller groups.

== Fisheries ==
Pomadasys stridens is not regarded as a food fish in South Africa where it may be caught as a bait fish but it is regarded as a commercially important food fish in the northern Indian Ocean in areas such as the Gulf of Aqaba, Persian Gulf and the Bitter Lakes in Egypt.
