= Philichthyidae =

Scientific classification
- Kingdom: Animalia
- Phylum: Arthropoda
- Clade: Pancrustacea
- Class: Copepoda
- Order: Cyclopoida
- Suborder: Ergasilida
- Family: Philichthyidae; Vogt, 1877

Family of crustaceans

Philichthyidae is a family of copepods, containing the following genera:

- Colobomatoides Essafi & Raibaut, 1980
- Colobomatus Hesse, 1873
- Ichthyotaces Shiino, 1932
- Leposphilus Hesse, 1866
- Lernaeascus Claus, 1886
- Philichthys Steenstrup, 1862
- Procolobomatus Castro-Romero & Baeza-Kurok, 1994
- Sarcotaces Olsson, 1872
- Sphaerifer Richiardi, 1874
