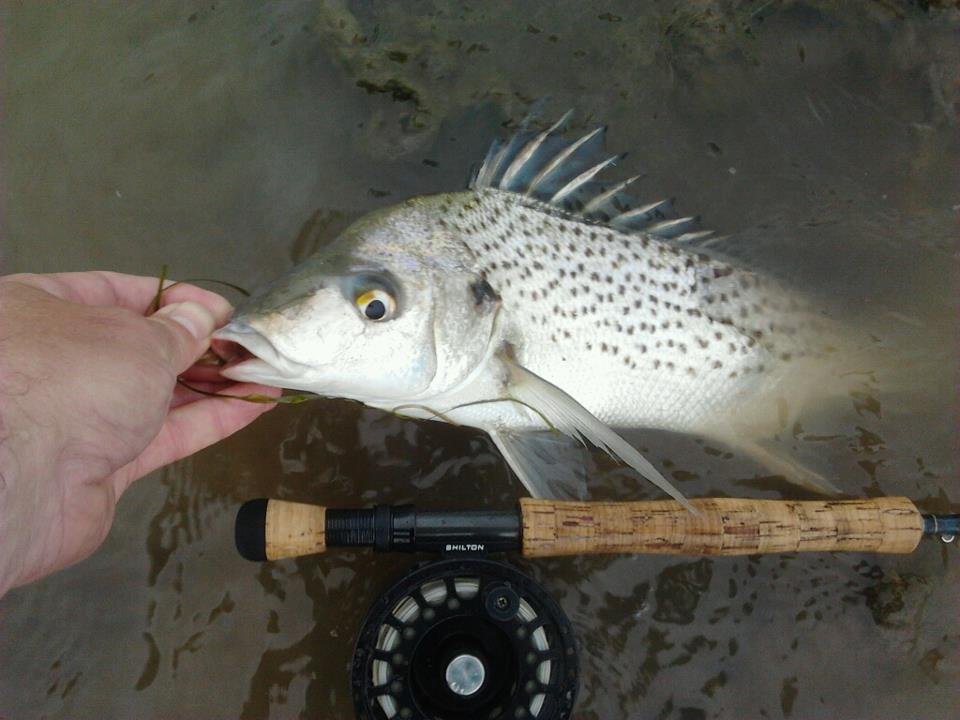
- Small-spotted Grunter (P. commersonnii)

Scientific classification
- Kingdom: Animalia
- Phylum: Chordata
- Class: Actinopterygii
- Division: Teleostei
- Order: Acanthuriformes
- Family: Haemulidae
- Subfamily: Haemulinae
- Genus: Pomadasys; Lacépède, 1802

Type species
- Sciaena argentea (Forsskål, 1775)

Synonyms
- Anomalodon S. Bowdich, 1825; Dacymba D. S. Jordan & C. L. Hubbs, 1917; Polotus Blyth, 1858; Pomadasyina Fowler, 1931; Pristipoma Quoy & Gaimard, 1824; Pristipomus Oken, 1817

= Pomadasys =

Pomadasys Temporal range: Middle Eocene–present

Genus of ray-finned fishes

Pomadasys is a genus of grunts native to the waters of the eastern Atlantic Ocean and through the Indian Ocean to the Pacific coast of the Americas. The name of this genus is a compound of poma meaning "lid" or "covering" and dasys meaning "rough", a reference to the serrated preopercle.

== Species ==
There are currently 29 recognized species in this genus:

- Pomadasys aheneus McKay & J. E. Randall, 1995 (Yellowback grunt)
- Pomadasys andamanensis McKay & Satapoomin, 1994
- Pomadasys argenteus (Forsskål, 1775) (Silver grunt)
- Pomadasys argyreus (Valenciennes, 1833) (Bluecheek silver grunt)
- Pomadasys auritus (G. Cuvier, 1830) (Longhead grunt)
- Pomadasys bipunctatus Kner, 1898
- Pomadasys commersonnii (Lacépède, 1801) (Smallspotted grunter)
- Pomadasys empherus W. A. Bussing, 1993 (Bigspine grunt)
- Pomadasys furcatus (Bloch & J. G. Schneider, 1801) (Banded grunter)
- Pomadasys grunniens (Forster, 1801)
- Pomadasys incisus (S. Bowdich, 1825) (Bastard grunt)
- Pomadasys jubelini (G. Cuvier, 1830) (Sompat grunt)
- Pomadasys kaakan (G. Cuvier, 1830) (Javelin grunter)
- Pomadasys laurentino (J. L. B. Smith, 1953) (Manylined grunter)
- Pomadasys maculatus (Bloch, 1793) (Saddle grunt)
- Pomadasys multimaculatus (Playfair (fr), 1867) (Cock grunter)
- Pomadasys olivaceus (F. Day, 1875) (Olive grunt)
- Pomadasys perotaei (G. Cuvier, 1830) (Parrot grunt)
- Pomadasys punctulatus (Rüppell, 1838) (Lined grunt)
- Pomadasys quadrilineatus S. C. Shen & W. W. Lin, 1984 (Yellow-lined grunter)
- Pomadasys ramosus (Poey, 1860)
- Pomadasys rogerii (G. Cuvier, 1830) (Pigsnout grunt)
- Pomadasys schyrii Steindachner, 1900
- Pomadasys striatus (Gilchrist & W. W. Thompson, 1908) (Striped grunter)
- Pomadasys stridens (Forsskål, 1775) (Striped piggy)
- Pomadasys suillus (Valenciennes, 1833)
- Pomadasys taeniatus McKay & J. E. Randall, 1995 (Bronzestriped grunt)
- Pomadasys trifasciatus Fowler, 1937 (Black-ear javelin)
- Pomadasys unimaculatus M. C. Tian, 1982 (Red patched grunter)

The fossil species †Pomadasys sadeki (Joleaud & Cuvillier, 1933) (formerly placed in its own genus, Kemtichthys) is known from the Middle Eocene-aged Mokattam Formation of Egypt.

== Systematics ==
Pomadasys has been subject to some molecular studies which have resolved the genus as paraphyletic. To resolve this paraphyly the genera Rhencus and Rhonciscus were revived with the eastern Pacific species P. macrocanthus and P. panamensis being placed in Rhencus while Rhonicus contains the eastern Pacific species P. bayanus and the western Atlantic species P. crocro.
