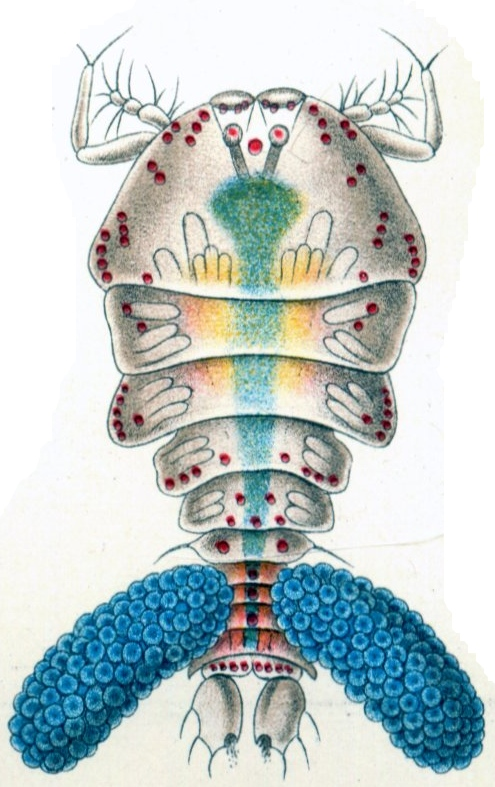
- Sapphirina darwinii with egg cases

Scientific classification
- Domain: Eukaryota
- Kingdom: Animalia
- Phylum: Arthropoda
- Class: Copepoda
- Order: Cyclopoida
- Family: Sapphirinidae
- Genus: Sapphirina
- Species: S. darwinii

Binomial name
- Sapphirina darwinii Haeckel, 1864

= Sapphirina darwinii =

Species of crustacean

Sapphirina darwinii is a species of parasitic copepod. It is widespread and common in the Indian Ocean, and reaches a maximum length of 2.8 millimetres (0.11 in).
