= Rhynchomolgidae =

Scientific classification
- Domain: Eukaryota
- Kingdom: Animalia
- Phylum: Arthropoda
- Class: Copepoda
- Order: Cyclopoida
- Suborder: Ergasilida
- Family: Rhynchomolgidae

Family of crustaceans

Rhynchomolgidae is a family of cyclopoid copepods in the order Cyclopoida. There are more than 40 genera and 280 described species in Rhynchomolgidae.

== Genera ==
These 47 genera belong to the family Rhynchomolgidae:

- Acanthomolgus Humes & Stock, 1972
- Alcyonomolgus Humes, 1990
- Anisomolgus Humes & Stock, 1972
- Ascetomolgus Humes & Stock, 1972
- Aspidomolgus Humes, 1969
- Calonastes Humes & Goenaga, 1978
- Calonnstes
- Colobomolgus Humes & Stock, 1972
- Contomolgus Humes & Stock, 1972
- Critomolgus Humes & Stock, 1983
- Diallagomolgus Humes, 1979
- Doridicola Leydig, 1853
- Emunoa Humes, 1996
- Indomolgus H.o.Humes, 1966
- Isomolgus Dojiri, 1988
- Kombia Humes, 1962
- Lambanetes Humes, 1982
- Lutumidomus Kim I.H., 2006
- Mandobius Humes, 1991
- Mecra Humes, 1980
- Meringomolgus Humes & Stock, 1972
- Moluccomolgus Humes, 1992
- Monomolgus Humes & Frost, 1964
- Notoxynus Humes, 1975
- Numboa Humes, 1997
- Pachysericola Kim I.H., 2003
- Paradoridicola Humes & Stock, 1972
- Paramolgus Humes & Stock, 1972
- Paranthessius Claus, 1889
- Paredromolgus Humes & Stock, 1972
- Pennatulicola Humes & Stock, 1972
- Perosyna Humes, 1982
- Pionomolgus Dojiri & Grygier, 1990
- Plesiomolgus Humes & Stock, 1972
- Ravahina H.o.Humes, 1968
- Rhynchomolgus H.o.Humes, 1967
- Solitaricola Stock, 1985
- Spaniomolgus Humes & Stock, 1972,2018
- Telestacicola Humes & Stock, 1972
- Temnomolgus H.o.Humes, 1966
- Verutipes Humes, 1982
- Visayasia Humes, 1992
- Wedanus Humes, 1978
- Xenomolgus Humes & Stock, 1972
- Zamolgus Humes & Stock, 1972
- Zndomolgus
- Zsomolgus
