= Thaumatopsyllidae =

Scientific classification
- Domain: Eukaryota
- Kingdom: Animalia
- Phylum: Arthropoda
- Class: Copepoda
- Order: Cyclopoida
- Suborder: Oithonida
- Family: Thaumatopsyllidae

Family of crustaceans

Thaumatopsyllidae is a family of crustaceans belonging to the order Cyclopoida.

Genera:

- Australopsyllus McKinnon, 1994
- Caribeopsyllus Suárez-Moraless & Castellanos, 1998
- Orientopsyllus Sewell, 1949
- Thaumatopsyllus Sars, 1913
- Thespesiopsyllus Wilson, 1924
