= Pomadasys grunniens =

Scientific classification
- Kingdom: Animalia
- Phylum: Chordata
- Class: Actinopterygii
- Order: Acanthuriformes
- Family: Haemulidae
- Genus: Pomadasys
- Species: P. grunniens

Binomial name
- Pomadasys grunniens (Foster, 1801)

Species of fish

Pomadasys grunniens is a specie of fish from the family Haemulidae, or the grunts.
