= Lubbockiidae =

Scientific classification
- Kingdom: Animalia
- Phylum: Arthropoda
- Clade: Pancrustacea
- Class: Copepoda
- Order: Cyclopoida
- Suborder: Ergasilida
- Family: Lubbockiidae

Family of crustaceans

Lubbockiidae is a family of cyclopoid copepods in the order Cyclopoida. There are about 7 genera and 15 described species in Lubbockiidae.

== Genera ==
These seven genera belong to the family Lubbockiidae:

- Atrophia Huys & Böttger-Schnack, 1997
- Haplopodia Huys & Böttger-Schnack, 1997
- Homeognathia Huys & Böttger-Schnack, 1997
- Laitmatobius Humes, 1987
- Lubbockia Claus, 1863
- Pseudolubbockia G. O. Sars, 1909
- Rhamphochela Huys & Böttger-Schnack, 1997
