= Kelleria (crustacean) =

Scientific classification
- Domain: Eukaryota
- Kingdom: Animalia
- Phylum: Arthropoda
- Class: Copepoda
- Order: Cyclopoida
- Suborder: Ergasilida
- Family: Kelleriidae; Humes & Boxshall, 1996
- Genus: Kelleria; Gurney, 1927

Genus of crustaceans

Kelleria is a genus of cyclopoid copepods in the family Kelleriidae, the sole genus in the family. There are about 19 described species in Kelleria.

The genus was first described in 1927 by Robert Gurney.

== Species ==
These 19 species belong to the genus Kelleria:

- Kelleria andamanensis Sewell, 1949
- Kelleria australiensis Bayly, 1971
- Kelleria camortensis Sewell, 1949
- Kelleria corioensis Arnott & McKinnon, 1981
- Kelleria gradata Stock, 1967
- Kelleria grandisetiger Kim I.H., 2006
- Kelleria gurneyi Sewell, 1949
- Kelleria indonesiana Mulyadi, 2009
- Kelleria javaensis Mulyadi, 2009
- Kelleria multiovigera Kim I.H., 2009
- Kelleria pectinata (Scott A., 1909)
- Kelleria portiviva Kim I.H., 2006
- Kelleria propinquus (Scott T., 1894)
- Kelleria purpurocincta Gurney, 1927
- Kelleria reducta Gómez, 2006
- Kelleria regalis Gurney, 1927
- Kelleria rubimaculata Krishnaswamy, 1952
- Kelleria undecidentata Kim I.H., 2006
- Kelleria vaga Kim I.H., 2000
