= Intramolgus =

Scientific classification
- Domain: Eukaryota
- Kingdom: Animalia
- Phylum: Arthropoda
- Class: Copepoda
- Order: Cyclopoida
- Family: Intramolgidae
- Genus: Intramolgus; Marchenkov & Boxshall, 1995
- Species: I. arcticus

Binomial name
- Intramolgus arcticus Marchenkov & Boxshall, 1995

Genus of crustaceans

Intramolgus is a monotypic genus of crustaceans belonging to the monotypic family Intramolgidae. The only species is Intramolgus arcticus.

The species is found in the White Sea.
