= Splanchnotrophidae =

Scientific classification
- Domain: Eukaryota
- Kingdom: Animalia
- Phylum: Arthropoda
- Class: Copepoda
- Order: Cyclopoida
- Suborder: Ergasilida
- Family: Splanchnotrophidae

Family of crustaceans

Splanchnotrophidae is a family of cyclopoid copepods in the order Cyclopoida. There are about 7 genera and more than 30 described species in Splanchnotrophidae.

== Genera ==
These seven genera belong to the family Splanchnotrophidae:

- Arthurius Huys, 2001
- Ceratosomicola Huys, 2001
- Ismaila Bergh, 1868
- Lomanoticola Scott & Scott, 1895
- Lomantoticola
- Majimun Uyeno & Nagasawa, 2012
- Splanchnotrophus Hancock & Norman, 1863
