= Taeniacanthidae =

Scientific classification
- Domain: Eukaryota
- Kingdom: Animalia
- Phylum: Arthropoda
- Class: Copepoda
- Order: Cyclopoida
- Suborder: Ergasilida
- Family: Taeniacanthidae; Wilson C.B., 1911

Synonyms
- Taeniacanthinae Wilson C.B., 1911; Tuccidae Vervoort, 1962; Tuccinae Vervoort, 1962; Umazuracolidae Ho, Ohtsuka & Nakadachi, 2006

Family of crustaceans

Taeniacanthidae is a family of cyclopoid copepods in the order Cyclopoida. There are more than 20 genera and 120 described species in Taeniacanthidae.

== Genera ==
These 23 genera belong to the family Taeniacanthidae:

- Anchistrotos Brian, 1906
- Biacanthus Tang & Izawa, 2005
- Caudacanthus Tang & Johnston, 2005
- Cepolacanthus Venmathi Maran, Moon, Adday & Tang, 2016
- Cirracanthus Dojiri & Cressey, 1987
- Clavisodalis Humes, 1970
- Clavisodulis
- Echinirus Humes & Cressey, 1961
- Echinosocius Humes & Cressey, 1961
- Haemaphilus Hesse, 1871
- Irodes C. B. Wilson, 1911
- Metataeniacanthus Pillai, 1963
- Nudisodalis Dojiri & Cressey, 1987
- Phagus Wilson C.B., 1911
- Pseudotaeniacanthus Yamaguti & Yamasu, 1959
- Saging Uyeno, Tang & Nagasawa, 2013
- Scolecicara Ho, 1969
- Suncheonacanthus Venmathi Maran, Moon, Adday & Tang, 2016
- Taeniacanthodes C. B. Wilson, 1935
- Taeniacanthus Sumpf, 1871
- Taeniastrotos Cressey, 1969
- Tucca Krøyer, 1837
- Umazuracola Ho, Ohtsuka & Nakadachi, 2006
