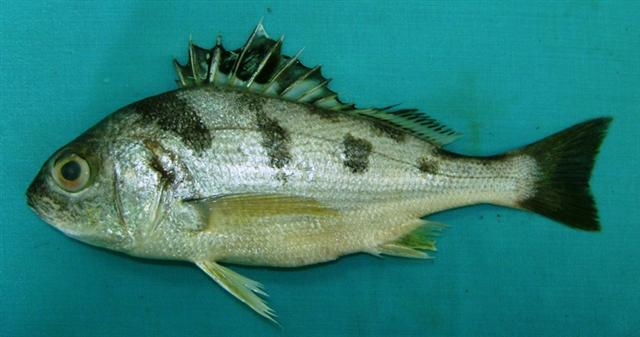

Conservation status
- Least Concern (IUCN 3.1)

Scientific classification
- Kingdom: Animalia
- Phylum: Chordata
- Class: Actinopterygii
- Order: Acanthuriformes
- Family: Haemulidae
- Genus: Pomadasys
- Species: P. maculatus

Binomial name
- Pomadasys maculatus (Bloch, 1793)

Synonyms
- Anthias maculatus Bloch, 1793; Lutjanus maculatus (Bloch, 1793); Pristipoma caripa Cuvier, 1829

= Pomadasys maculatus =

Species of fish

Pomadasys maculatus, commonly known as the saddle grunt, blotched grunt or blotched javelin, is a species of marine ray-finned fish, a grunt belonging to the family Haemulidae. It is native to the Indo-West Pacific region.

== Description ==
Pomadasys maculatus has a body which is around two and half times as long as it is deep. It has a blunt head with a convex upper profile and a small mouth which has brush like bands of teeth on its jaws. The dorsal fin has 12 spines and 13-15 soft rays while the anal fin has 3 spines and 6–8, normally 7, soft rays. It has an overall silvery grey colour with a purplish or brownish head, there are a series of broken vertical bars across the nape and back, the bar on the nape being the most obvious. The spined part of the dorsal fin has a large black blotch, the dorsal and caudal fins have black margins while the remaining fins are yellowish. This species attains a maximum total length of 59.3 cm (23.3 in), although 30 cm (12 in) is more typical, with a maximum published weight of 3.2 kg (7.1 lb).

== Distribution ==
Pomadasys maculatus has a wide Indo-Pacific distribution. It is found along the east African coast from the Red Sea south to the Eastern Cape Province in South Africa, across the Indian Ocean, including the Seychelles and the Mascarenes. Its range extends as far east as Queensland and Papua New Guinea and north to southern Japan.

== Habitat and biology ==
Pomadasys maculatus can be found at depths between 20 and 120 m (66 and 394 ft) in coastal inshore waters. It is an amphidromous species found in open bays and estuaries. It feeds on crustaceans or fishes. It is an oviparous species which forms distinct pairs for spawning.

== Systematics ==
Pomadfasys maculatus was first formally described in 1793 as Anthias maculatus by the German naturalist Marcus Elieser Bloch (1723–1799) with the type locality given as the East Indies. The specific name maculatus means "spotted", referring to the blotches across the back and nape.

== Utilisation ==
Pomadasys maculatus is commercially fished for throughout its range. It is caught using bottom trawls, handlines, set nets, traps, and spears. It is often quite abundant in areas used to trawl for prawns. The catch is sold fresh, with a quantities being preserved by either salting or smoking.
