= Clausiidae =

Scientific classification
- Kingdom: Animalia
- Phylum: Arthropoda
- Clade: Pancrustacea
- Class: Copepoda
- Order: Cyclopoida
- Suborder: Ergasilida
- Family: Clausiidae; Giesbrecht, 1895

Family of crustaceans

Clausiidae is a family of parasitic copepods in the order Cyclopoida,

== Genera ==
The family contains the following genera:

- Boreoclausia Kim I.H., Sikorski, O'Reilly & Boxshall, 2013
- Clausia Claparède, 1863
- Donusa Nordmann, 1864
- Flabelliphilus Bresciani & Lützen, 1962
- Indoclausia Sebastian & Pillai, 1974
- Likroclausia Ho & I.H. Kim, 2003
- Maxilliclausia Kim I.H., 2014
- Megaclausia O'Reilly, 1995
- Mesnilia Canu, 1898
- Oshoroclausia Uyeno & Kakui, 2015
- Pontoclausia Bacescu & Por, 1959
- Pseudoclausia Bocquet & Stock, 1960
- Rhodinicola Levinsen, 1878
- Sheaderia Kim I.H., Sikorski, O'Reilly & Boxshall, 2013
- Spionicola Björnberg & Radashevsky, 2009
- Vivgottoia Kim I.H., Sikorski, O'Reilly & Boxshall, 2013
