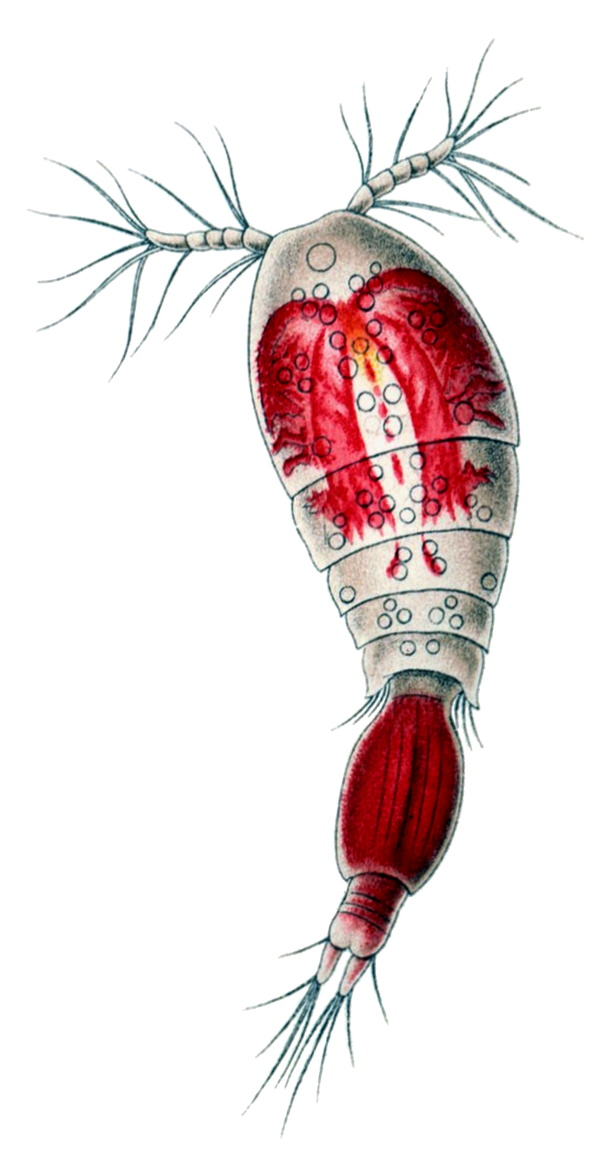
- Male Oncaea venusta

Scientific classification
- Kingdom: Animalia
- Phylum: Arthropoda
- Clade: Pancrustacea
- Class: Copepoda
- Order: Cyclopoida
- Suborder: Ergasilida
- Family: Oncaeidae; Giesbrecht, 1893

= Oncaeidae =

Family of crustaceans

Oncaeidae is a family of copepods, containing the following genera:

- Archioncaea Böttger-Schnack & Huys, 1997
- Conaea Giesbrecht, 1891
- Epicalymma Heron, 1977
- Monothula Böttger-Schnack & Huys, 2001
- Oncaea Philippi, 1843
- Spinoncaea Böttger-Schnack, 2003
- Triconia Böttger-Schnack, 1999
