= Bomolochidae =

Scientific classification
- Kingdom: Animalia
- Phylum: Arthropoda
- Clade: Pancrustacea
- Class: Copepoda
- Order: Cyclopoida
- Suborder: Ergasilida
- Family: Bomolochidae; Claus, 1875

Synonyms
- Tegobomolochidae Izawa, 1976

Family of crustaceans

Bomolochidae is a family of copepods parasitic on marine fishes. Most species parasitize the gills of fish, but some species live in the nostrils or on the eyes of their hosts. The family contains just over 150 species from the following genera:

- Acanthocolax Vervoort, 1969
- Acantholochus Cressey, 1984
- Bomolochus Nordmann, 1832
- Boylea Cressey, 1977
- Ceratocolax Vervoort, 1965
- Cresseyus Ho & Lin, 2006
- Dicrobomolochus Vervoort, 1969
- Hamaticolax Ho & Lin, 2006
- Holobomolochus Vervoort, 1969
- Holocolax Cressey, 1982
- Megacolax Izawa, 2021
- Naricolax Ho, Do & Kasahara, 1983
- Neobomolochus Cressey, 1981
- Nothobomolochus Vervoort, 1962
- Orbitacolax Shen, 1957
- Paraorbitacolax Izawa, 2021
- Pseudoeucanthus Brian, 1906
- Pseudorbitacolax Pillai, 1971
- Pumiliopes Shen, 1957
- Pumiliopsis Pillai, 1967
- Tegobomolochus Izawa, 1976
- Triceracolax Izawa, 2021
- Unicolax Cressey & Cressey, 1980
