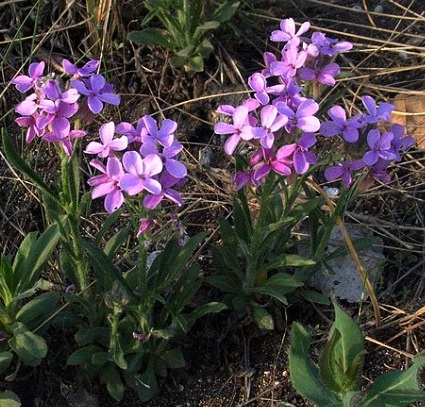
- The Clausia aprica plant

Scientific classification
- Kingdom: Plantae
- Clade: Tracheophytes
- Clade: Angiosperms
- Clade: Eudicots
- Clade: Rosids
- Order: Brassicales
- Family: Brassicaceae
- Genus: Clausia; Korn.-Trotzky

= Clausia (plant) =

Genus of flowering plants

Clausia is a genus of flowering plants belonging to the family Brassicaceae.

Its native range is Eastern Central Europe to Temperate Asia.

Species:

- Clausia aprica (Stephan ex Willd.) Korn.-Trotzky
- Clausia kasakhorum Pavlov
- Clausia robusta Pachom.
- Clausia trichosepala (Turcz.) Dvorák
