= Cyclorhiza (plant) =

Scientific classification
- Kingdom: Plantae
- Clade: Tracheophytes
- Clade: Angiosperms
- Clade: Eudicots
- Clade: Asterids
- Order: Apiales
- Family: Apiaceae
- Subfamily: Apioideae
- Tribe: Komarovieae
- Genus: Cyclorhiza; M.L.Sheh & R.H.Shan

Genus of flowering plants

Cyclorhiza is a genus of flowering plants belonging to the family Apiaceae.

Its native range is Tibet to Southern China.

Species:

- Cyclorhiza peucedanifolia (Franch.) Constance
- Cyclorhiza waltonii (H.Wolff) M.L.Sheh & R.H.Shan
