= Phyllodicolidae =

Scientific classification
- Domain: Eukaryota
- Kingdom: Animalia
- Phylum: Arthropoda
- Class: Copepoda
- Order: Cyclopoida
- Suborder: Ergasilida
- Family: Phyllodicolidae

Synonyms
- Phyllocolidae

Family of crustaceans

Phyllodicolidae is a family of copepods belonging to the order Cyclopoida.

Genera:

- Cyclorhiza Heegaard, 1942
- Phyllodicola Delamare Deboutteville & Laubier, 1960
