= Fratia gaditana =

Scientific classification
- Domain: Eukaryota
- Kingdom: Animalia
- Phylum: Arthropoda
- Class: Copepoda
- Order: Cyclopoida
- Suborder: Cyclopida
- Family: Fratiidae; Ho, Conradi & López-González, 1998
- Genus: Fratia; Ho, Conradi & López-González, 1998
- Species: F. gaditana

Binomial name
- Fratia gaditana Ho, Conradi & López-González, 1998

Genus of crustaceans

Fratia is a monotypic genus of crustaceans belonging to the monotypic family Fratiidae. The only species is Fratia gaditana.

The species is found in Spain.
