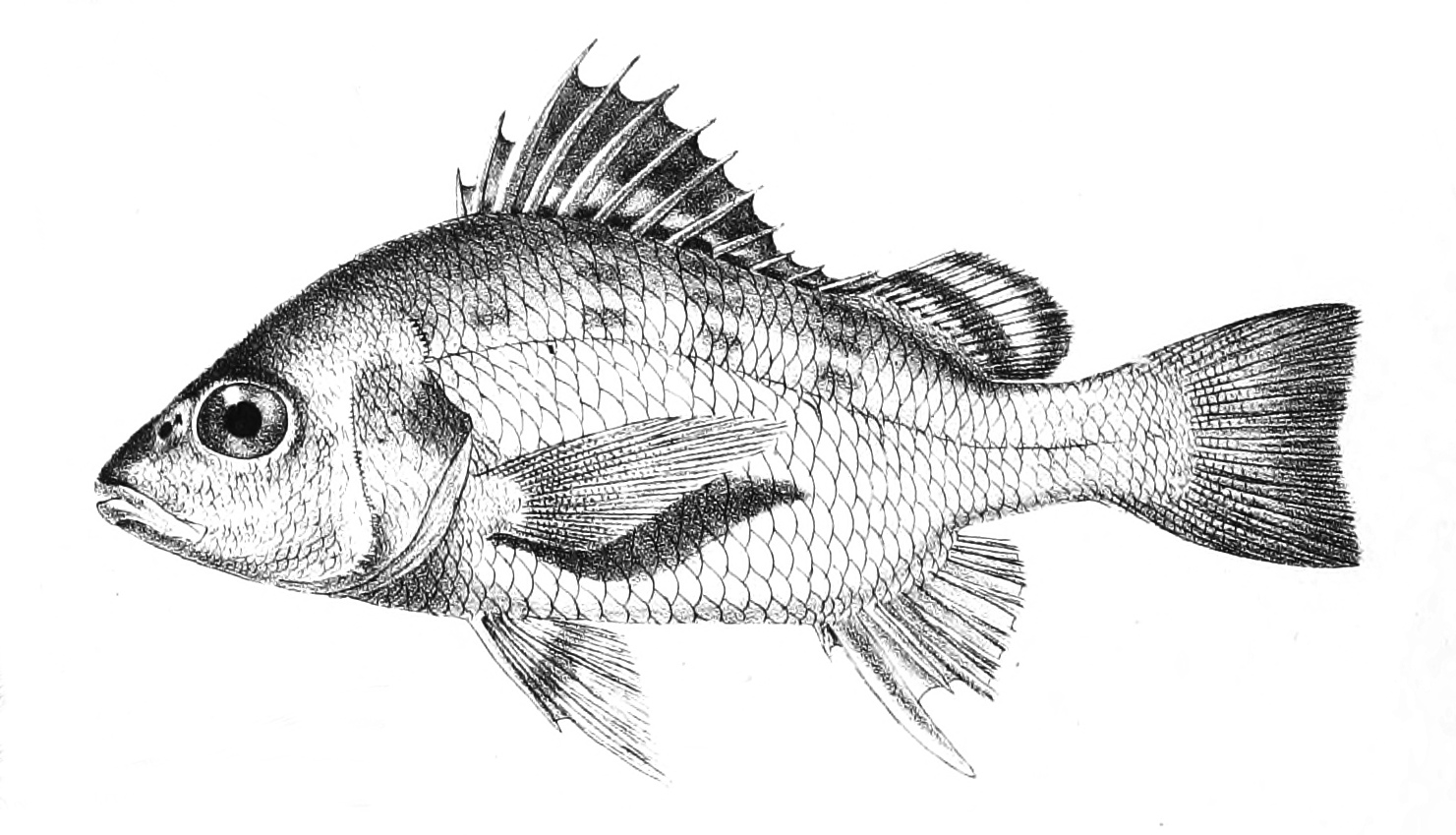

Conservation status
- Least Concern (IUCN 3.1)

Scientific classification
- Kingdom: Animalia
- Phylum: Chordata
- Class: Actinopterygii
- Division: Teleostei
- Order: Acanthuriformes
- Family: Haemulidae
- Genus: Pomadasys
- Species: P. argenteus

Binomial name
- Pomadasys argenteus Forskal, 1775

Synonyms
- Sciaena argentea Forsskål, 1775; Pristipoma argenteum (Forsskål, 1775); Lutjanus hasta Bloch, 1790; Pomadasys hasta (Bloch, 1790); Pristipoma hasta (Bloch, 1790); Lutjanus microstomus Lacépède, 1802; Coius gudgutia Hamilton, 1822; Pristipoma chrysobalion Cuvier, 1830; Pristipoma nageb Rüppell, 1838; Polotus nitidus Blyth, 1858; Pristipoma manadense Günther, 1872

= Pomadasys argenteus =

Species of fish

Pomadasys argenteus, the silver grunt, silver javelin, grunter bream, small-spotted grunter-bream, small-spotted javelin fish, trumpeter or white-finned javelin fish, is a species of marine ray-finned fish, a grunt from the family Haemulidae. This species has a wide Indo-Pacific distribution. It is the type species of the genus Pomadasys.

== Description ==
Pomadasys argenteus is a silvery-mauve to pale brown fish fading to silvery-white towards the abdomen, there is occasionally a scattering of dark greyish spots on the back and upper flanks. The snout is dark brown snout, the upper operculum is dark greyish to purplish on its upper part. The pelvic and anal fins are yellow while the dorsal fin has rows of small spots along it. The juveniles have many spots which create a pattern of dark lines along the flanks. It has a blunt snout and a small mouth with brush like bands of teeth on the jaws. The dorsal fin has 12 spines and 13-14 soft rays, while the anal fin contains 3 spines and 7 soft rays. This species attains a maximum total length of 70 cm (28 in), although 25 cm (9.8 in) is more typical.

== Distribution ==
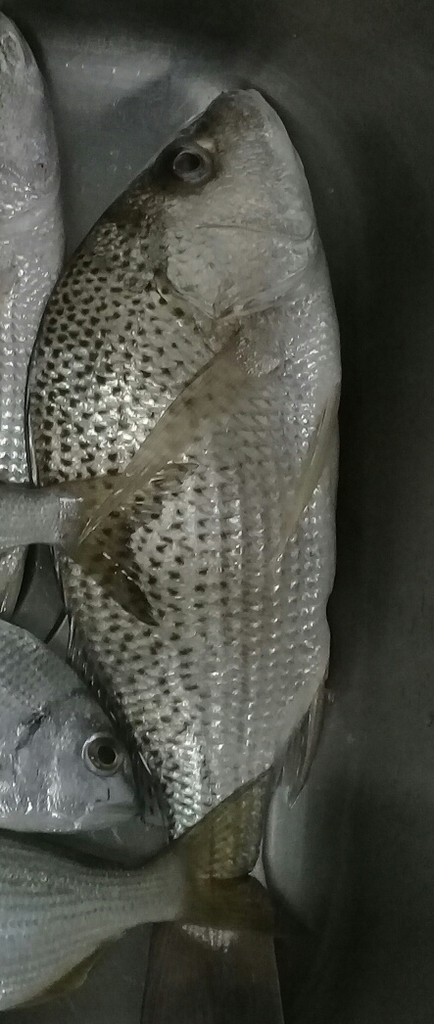
At fish market in Abu Dhabi

Pomadasys argenteus has a wide distribution in the Indian Ocean and the western Pacific Ocean. It occurs from the southern Red Sea, off Saudi Arabia and Yemen east to Vanuatu, north to southern Japan and south to Australia. It is absent from the Persian Gulf. In Australia they are found from the Exmouth Gulf in Western Australia across the northern part of the continent to the Richmond River in New South Wales.

== Habitat and biology ==
Pomadasys argenteus occurs in shallow inshore waters, in the vicinity reefs and in estuaries, mangroves too. It has been recorded entering fresh waters in Madagascar and Malaysia. The spawning season runs from the middle of May to early October, females spawn approximately six times in each season. This fish is predatory, preying on benthic invertebrates such as crustaceans, bivalves and polychaetes.

== Systematics ==
Pomadasys argenteus was first formally described as Sciaena argentea in 1775 by the Swedish speaking Finnish explorer and naturalist Peter Forsskål (1732-1763), his description was published posthumously by his companion, the German Carsten Niebuhr (1733-1815). The type locality was given as Jeddah. When Bernard Germain de Lacėpède (1756-1825) described the genus Pomadasys in 1802 he used Forsskål's Sciaena argentea as its type species, the genus being considered monotypic. The specific name argenteus means "silver" and refers to the main colour of this species.

== Utilisation ==
Pomadasys argenteus is caught using hook and line, set nets, traps and spears. The catch is mostly sold fresh or salted. 537 to 1,239 tons per year are landed in Malaysia.
