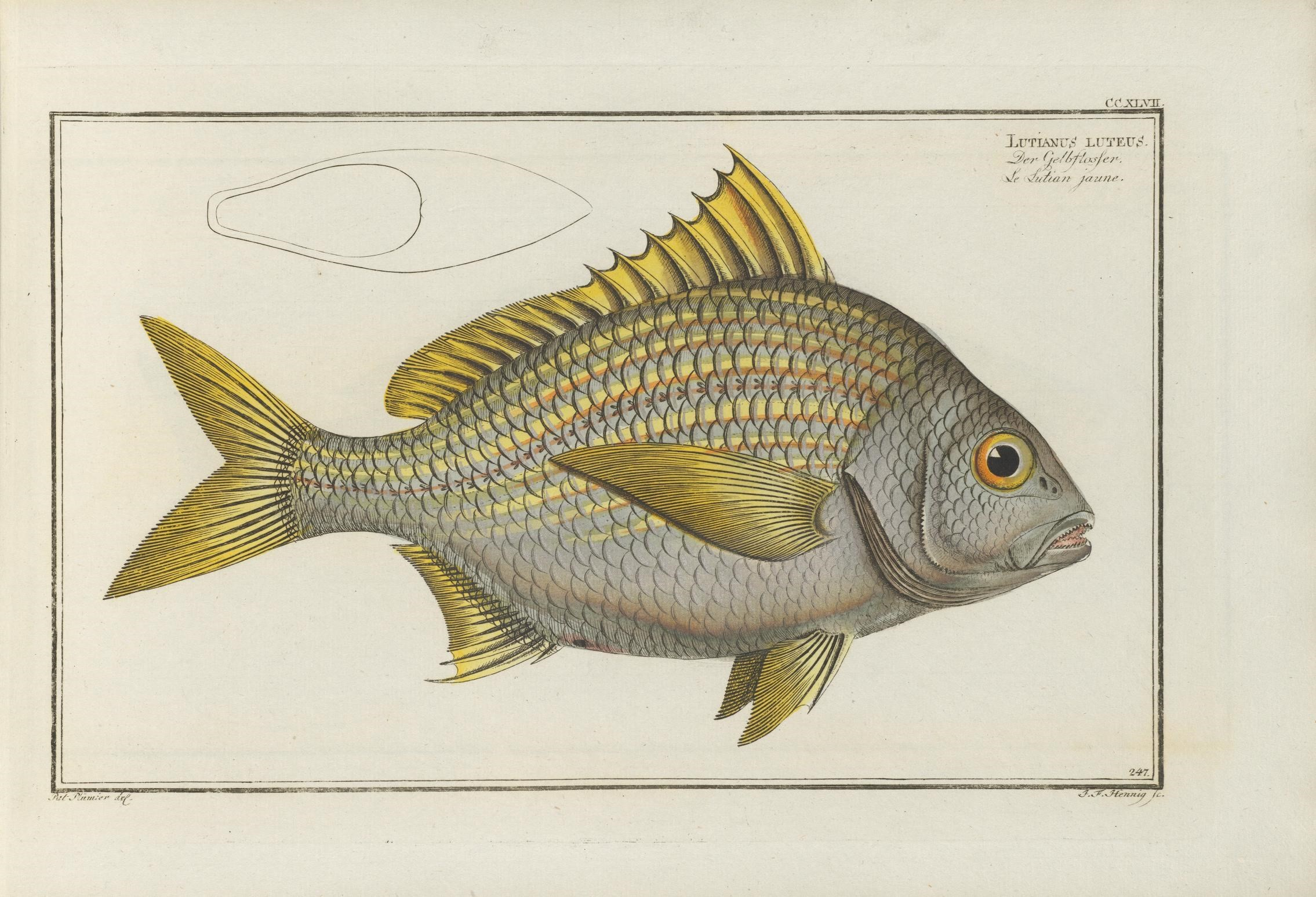

Scientific classification
- Kingdom: Animalia
- Phylum: Chordata
- Class: Actinopterygii
- Division: Teleostei
- Order: Acanthuriformes
- Family: Haemulidae
- Genus: Genyatremus
- Species: G. luteus

Binomial name
- Genyatremus luteus (Bloch, 1790)

Synonyms
- Lutjanus luteus Bloch, 1790; Haemulon luteus (Bloch, 1790)

= Genyatremus luteus =

Species of fish

Genyatremus luteus, the Torroto grunt, is a species of marine ray-finned fish, a sweetlips belonging to the subfamily Plectorhinchinae of the family Haemulidae. It is native to the Atlantic coast of South America from Colombia to Brazil.

== Description ==
Genyatremus luteus has an oval-shaped, compressed body, which has a depth which is just under half of its standard length. The head is small with a moderately large mouth. There are 2 ports on the chin, but no central groove while the preoperculum has strong serrations at its corner large. The dorsal fin is high, containing 13 spines, the fifth being longer than the others, and 12 soft rays, while the anal fin has 3 spines and 11 soft rays. The caudal fin is emarginate. The body silvery in colour with a yellowish tint. The edge of the preoperculum is yellow;. The spines in the dorsal fin are silvery and the fin has a black margin, the anal fin is yellowish. The pectoral fins have a yellowish cast. The pelvic fins have a black rear margin the base of the tail is yellowish and it also has a black rear margin. This species grows to 37 cm (15 in) in total length, though most do not exceed 25 cm (9.8 in), the maximum published weight is 800 g (28 oz).

== Distribution ==
Genyatremus luteus Is found in the Western Atlantic Ocean off the coast of South America where it is found from eastern Colombia to Brazil. It is also found north into the southern part of the Lesser Antilles.

== Habitat and biology ==
Genyatremus luteus prefers brackish waters of estuaries with a mud or sand substrate down to about 40 m (130 ft) but has also been caught in marine waters. It feeds on smaller fishes and crustaceans.

== Systematics ==
Genyatremus luteus was first formally described in 1790 as Lutjanus luteus by the German naturalist and physician Marcus Elieser Bloch with the type locality given as the Antilles, thought to be Martinique. The specific name luteus means “yellow”, a reference to the yellow or yellowish fins of this species. Some authorities have argued that Genyatremus luteus is not a valid name and that this taxon is synonymous with Cuvier's Diagramma cavifrons. Others argue that Cuvier's D. cavifrons is not a haemulid but is a member of another family altogether and that Bloch's L. luteus is valid and should be used as the type species of the genus Genyatremus.

== Utilisation ==
Genyatremus luteus is of minor importance to local commercial fisheries, it is caught using seines and trawls and the catch is mostly sold fresh.
