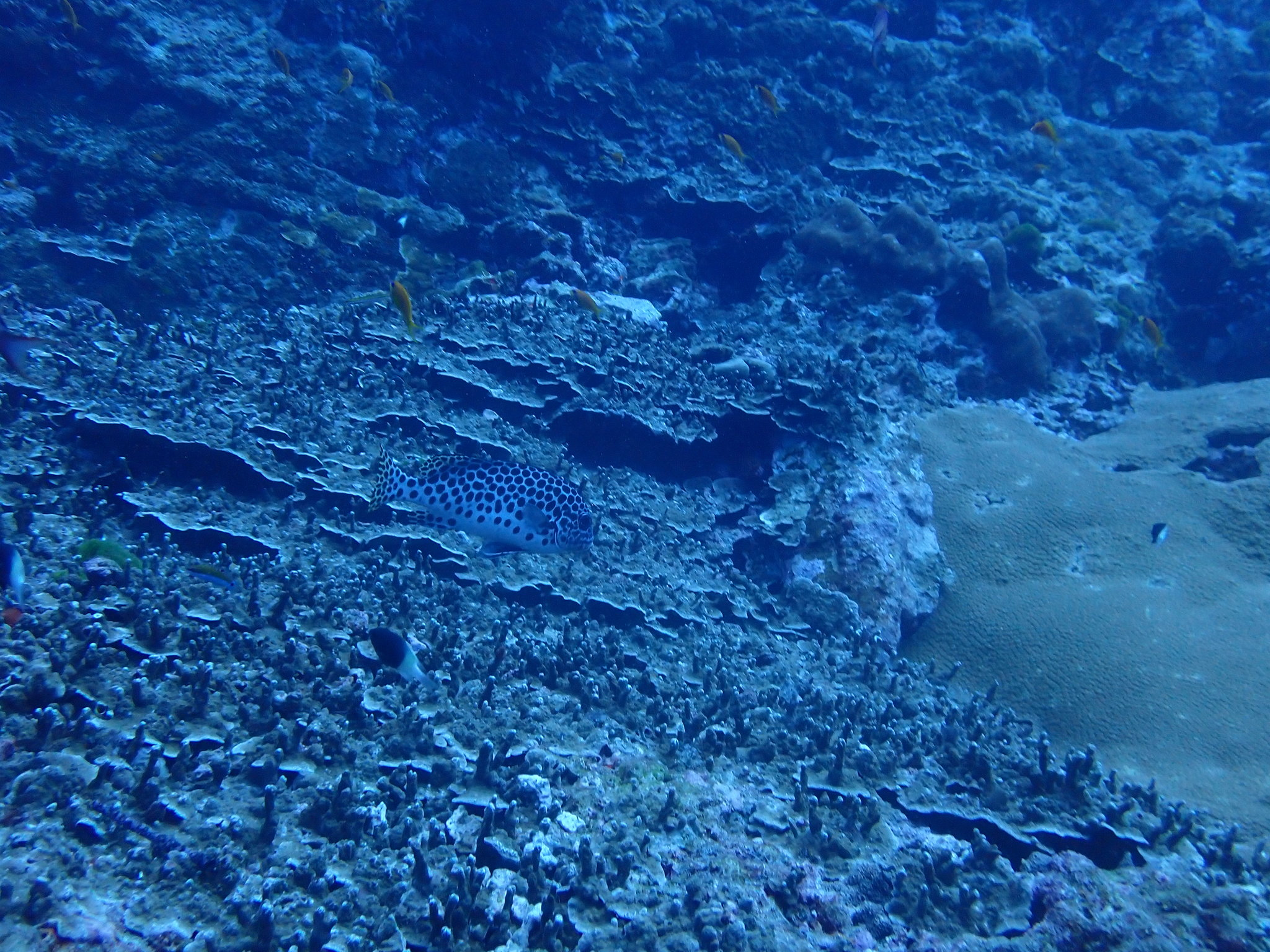

Scientific classification
- Kingdom: Animalia
- Phylum: Chordata
- Class: Actinopterygii
- Order: Acanthuriformes
- Family: Haemulidae
- Genus: Plectorhinchus
- Species: P. macrospilus

Binomial name
- Plectorhinchus macrospilus Satapoomin & Randall, 2000

= Plectorhinchus macrospilus =

Species of fish

Plectorhinchus macrospilus, the largespot sweetlips, largespot thicklips or Andaman sweetlips, is a species of marine ray-finned fish, a sweetlips belonging to the subfamily Plectorhinchinae, one of two subfamilies in the family Haemulidae, the grunts. It is native to the north eastern Indian Ocean.

== Description ==
Plectorhinchus macrospilus has an oblong, compressed body with a strongly convex dorsal profile of its head and a small mouth which has fleshy, moderately thick lips There are 6 pores on the chin but there is no central pit. There is a slight notch in the dorsal fin and the caudal fin is truncate. The dorsal fin contains 12 spines and 21 soft rays while the anal fin has 3 spines and 8 soft rays. The adults have a background colour of white to greyish over most of the body, the bases of the dorsal, anal and caudal fin are yellowish. The body colour is contrasted with large black spots, larger than the eye, on most of the body with smaller black spots on the head. The juveniles are marked with 4-5 black stripes, the width of the stripes being around half of the diameter of the eye. As the fish grows, these stripes break up into spots. This species attains a maximum total length of 28.5 cm (11.2 in).

== Distribution ==
Plectorhinchus macrospilus is found in the north eastern Indian Ocean in the Andaman Sea, off Myanmar and Thailand.

== Habitat and biology ==
Plectorhinchus macrospilus can be found in the caves and crevices of coral reefs and in the vicinity of underwater pinnacles as deep as 30 m (98 ft). It is a solitary species, except when spawning when they do so in distinct pairs.

== Systematics ==
Plectorhinchus macrospilus was first formally described in 2000 by Ukkrit Satapoomin and John E. Randall with the type locality given as Miang Island, one of the Similan Islands of Thailand. Its specific name macrospilus means "large marks" or "large spots", a reference to the large and obvious black spots on the body and fins of this species.
