= Plectorhinchus pica =

Scientific classification
- Kingdom: Animalia
- Phylum: Chordata
- Class: Actinopterygii
- Division: Teleostei
- Order: Acanthuriformes
- Family: Haemulidae
- Genus: Plectorhinchus
- Species: P. pica

Binomial name
- Plectorhinchus pica (G. Cuvier, 1828)

Synonyms
- List: Diagramma pica Cuvier, 1830; Gaterin picus (Cuvier, 1830); Plectorhinchus picus (Cuvier, 1830); Diagramma pica Cuvier, 1828; Diagramma punctatissimum Playfair, 1868; Gaterin punctatissimus (Playfair, 1868); Plectorhinchus punctatissimus (Playfair, 1868)

Species of fish

Plectorhinchus pica, the painted sweetlips, dotted sweetlips, magpie sweetlips or spotted sweetlips, is a species of marine ray-finned fish, a sweetlips belonging to the subfamily Plectorhinchinae, one of two subfamilies in the family Haemulidae, the grunts. It is native to coral reefs of the Indian Ocean and the western Pacific Ocean. It is a commercially important species and can be found in the aquarium trade.

== Systematics ==
Plectorhinchus pica was first formally described as Diagramma pica in 1828 by the French zoologist George’s Cuvier with no type locality being given, although Tahiti and the Indian Ocean have been suggested.

=== Etymology ===
The specific name Cuvier gave this taxon, pica, means "magpie", as in the Eurasian magpie (Pica pica), a reference to the black and white coloration of the juveniles. It has been suggested that the use of the specific name picus is an error as the word pica is a noun, not an adjective and should not change gender to match that of the new genus name. In fact, Cuvier used the French word for magpie pie when he described this species and used “Le Diagramme Pie” to refer to his Diagramma pica.

== Distribution ==
Plectorhinchus pica is found in the Indo-Pacific region from the Socotra, the Seychelles, the Comoros Islands, Madagascar and Mauritius east into the Pacific Ocean to the Society Islands, in the Pacific it ranges north to southern Japan and Ogasawara Islands, south to Australia, New Caledonia and Rapa Iti.

In Australian waters this species is found along the Great Barrier Reef as far south as Jervis Bay in New South Wales, with juveniles being recorded south to Barunguba / Montague Island, they are also found at Lord Howe Island in the Tasman Sea.

== Description ==
Juvenile

Plectorhinchus pica has been recorded growing up to a total length of 84 cm (33 in), although 70 cm (28 in) is more typical. It has fleshy lips which swell with age. There are 6 pores on its chin bit there is no median pit. The dorsal fin contains 12-14 spines and 17-20 soft rays while the anal fin has 3 spines and 7-8 soft rays.

The adults are patterned with dark brown spots which cover the head, back, flanks and fins. They have a dark brown to blackish dorsal fin which has large black spots and a central longitudinal grey stripe which is on the membranes but not the spines or rays, at the base of the pectoral and pelvic fins there is a patch of bright red in some individuals. The inside of the mouth, the rear margin of the maxilla and the gill membranes are scarlet to reddish-brown. The underparts are abdomen is pale greyish purple. The juveniles are white below and black above, the black being broken by a white snout and white saddle marks and spots.

== Habitat and biology ==
Plectorhinchus pica is found in both lagoon and seaward reefs, here the adults usually hide within caves or underneath coral heads, frequently along the margins of the reefs. The juveniles are frequently encountered in shallow lagoons. The adults are solitary and they feed on crustaceans and molluscs. It is an oviparous species which spawns as distinct pairs. They hide in their shelters during the day and forage at night, they will also eat smaller fishes.

== Utilisation ==
Plectorhinchus pica can be abundant in parts of its range, and is commercially fished using hand nets and by spear fishing. The catch is sold fresh or a small amount of it is preserved as salted fish. The juveniles sometimes appear in the aquarium trade, although the large adults are unsuitable for home aquaria.
