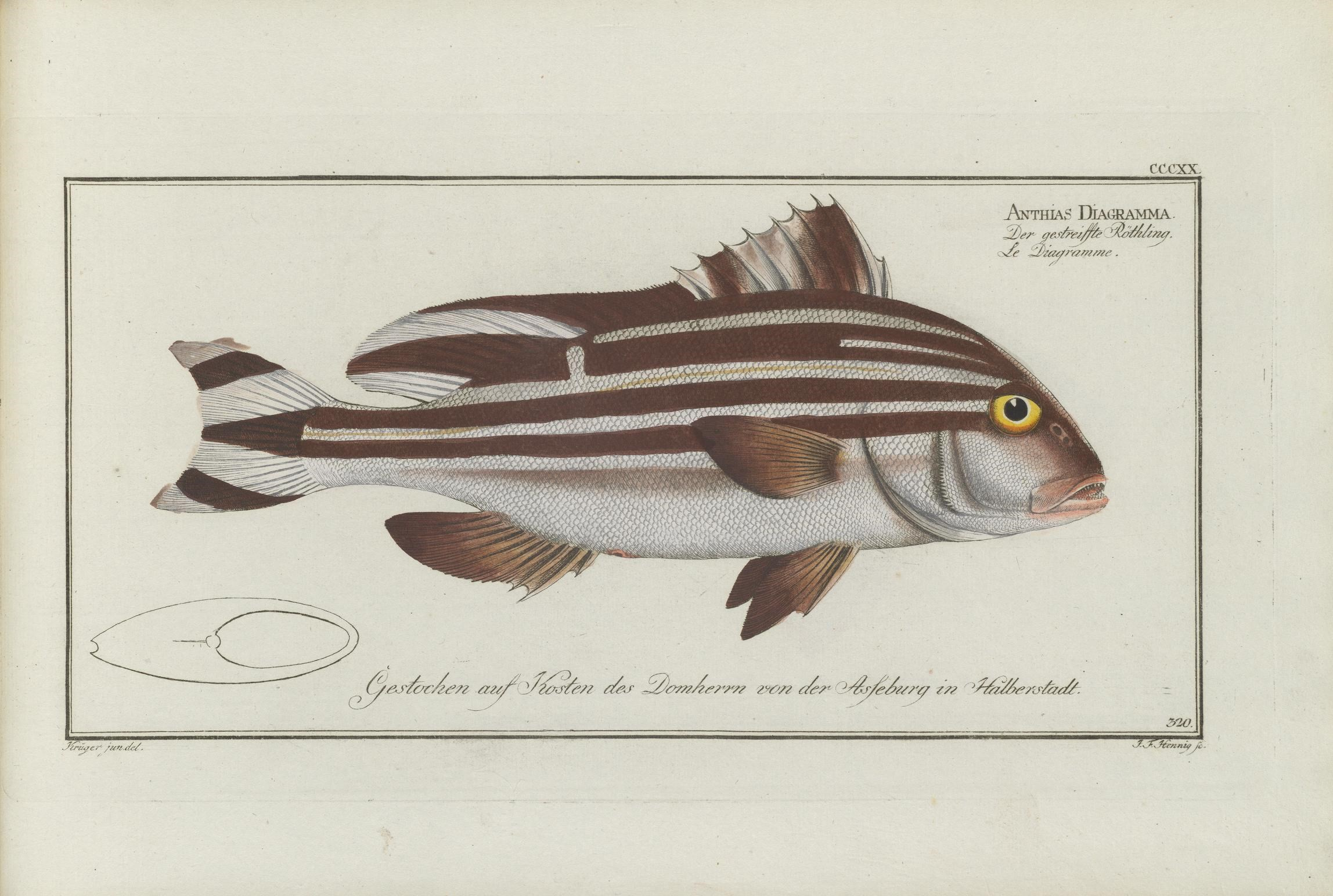

Scientific classification
- Kingdom: Animalia
- Phylum: Chordata
- Class: Actinopterygii
- Division: Teleostei
- Order: Acanthuriformes
- Family: Haemulidae
- Genus: Plectorhinchus
- Species: P. diagrammus

Binomial name
- Plectorhinchus diagrammus (Linnaeus, 1758)

Synonyms
- Perca diagramma Linnaeus, 1758; Gaterin diagrammus (Linnaeus, 1758); Diagramma lineatum (Cuv.)

= Plectorhinchus diagrammus =

Species of fish

Plectorhinchus diagrammus, the striped sweetlips, fourbanded sweetlips or silver-banded sweetlips, is a species of marine ray-finned fish, a sweetlips belonging to the subfamily Plectorhinchinae, one of two subfamilies in the family Haemulidae, the grunts. It feeds on benthic invertebrates. This species can reach 40 cm (16 in) in TL. It can be found in the aquarium trade and is farmed. It is native to the eastern Indian Ocean and the western Pacific Ocean, from the Andaman Islands to the Philippines, north as far as Japan, where it is an inhabitant of coral reefs. This species was first formally described in 1758 by Linnaeus in the 10th edition of the Systema Naturae, he gave it the name Perca diagramma. Its specific name diagrammus was not explained by Linnaeus but he cites Gronovius in his description who described "irregular longitudinal yellow lines", so the name is inferred to "a figure marked with lines".
