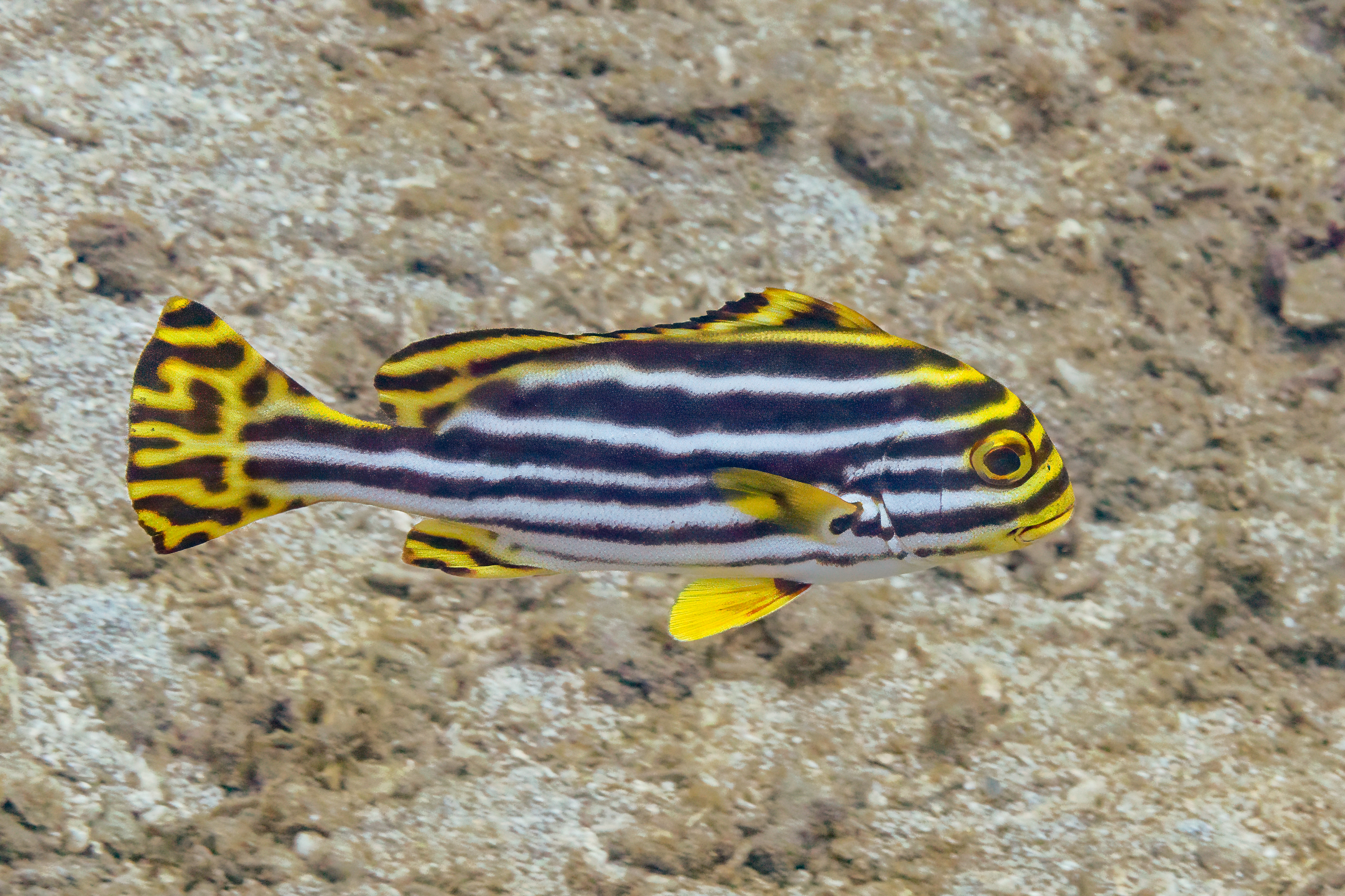

Conservation status
- Least Concern (IUCN 3.1)

Scientific classification
- Kingdom: Animalia
- Phylum: Chordata
- Class: Actinopterygii
- Division: Teleostei
- Order: Acanthuriformes
- Family: Haemulidae
- Genus: Plectorhinchus
- Species: P. vittatus

Binomial name
- Plectorhinchus vittatus (Linnaeus, 1758)

Synonyms
- List: Perca vittata Linnaeus, 1758; Anthias orientalis Bloch, 1793; Gaterin orientalis (Bloch, 1793); Plectorhinchus orientalis (Bloch, 1793); Bodianus cuvier J. W. Bennett, 1829

= Indian Ocean oriental sweetlips =

Species of fish

The Indian Ocean oriental sweetlips (Plectorhinchus vittatus), also known as the oriental sweetlips or oriental blubberlips, is a species of marine ray-finned fish, a sweetlips belonging to the subfamily Plectorhinchinae, one of two subfamilies in the family Haemulidae, the grunts. It is native to the Indian Ocean and the western Pacific Ocean.

== Systematics ==
The Indian Ocean oriental sweetlips was first formally described as Perca vittata in 1758 by Carl Linnaeus in the 10th edition of the Systema Naturae with no type locality given. The specific name, vittatus means "banded", a reference to the bold striped pattern of adults. Some authorities regard Bloch's Plectorhinchus orientalis as a separate species rather than a synonym of P. vittatus.

== Distribution ==
The Indian Ocean oriental sweetlips is found in the Indo-Pacific region. Its range extends from East Africa from Djibouti to South Africa, Madagascar, the Seychelles and Mascarene Islands, the Gulf of Mannar in India and the Andaman and Nicobar Islands east to Micronesia, Samoa, the Society Islands and Guam. It can also be found from Western Australia to Papua New Guinea and New Caledonia.

== Description ==
The Indian Ocean oriental sweetlips has been recorded growing up to a total length of 72 cm (28 in). It has fleshy lips which become greatly swollen as the fish ages. There are 6 pores on its chin but there is no median pit. The dorsal fin contains 12–14 spines and 16–20 soft rays while the anal fin has 3 spines and 7–8 soft rays.

Juvenile

The adults of this species have a basic light greyish colour of which fades to white on the abdomen. It has alternating black and white stripes. the black stripes normally broader on the upper body, the fins are yellow, as are the snout and forehead, The dorsal, anal and caudal fins are marked with blackish spots. The subadults have wide stripes on their head, body and fins while the juveniles have black blotches and spots that are joined but which slowly split into longitudinal stripes as they grow, the pectoral fins of juveniles are black.

== Habitat and biology ==
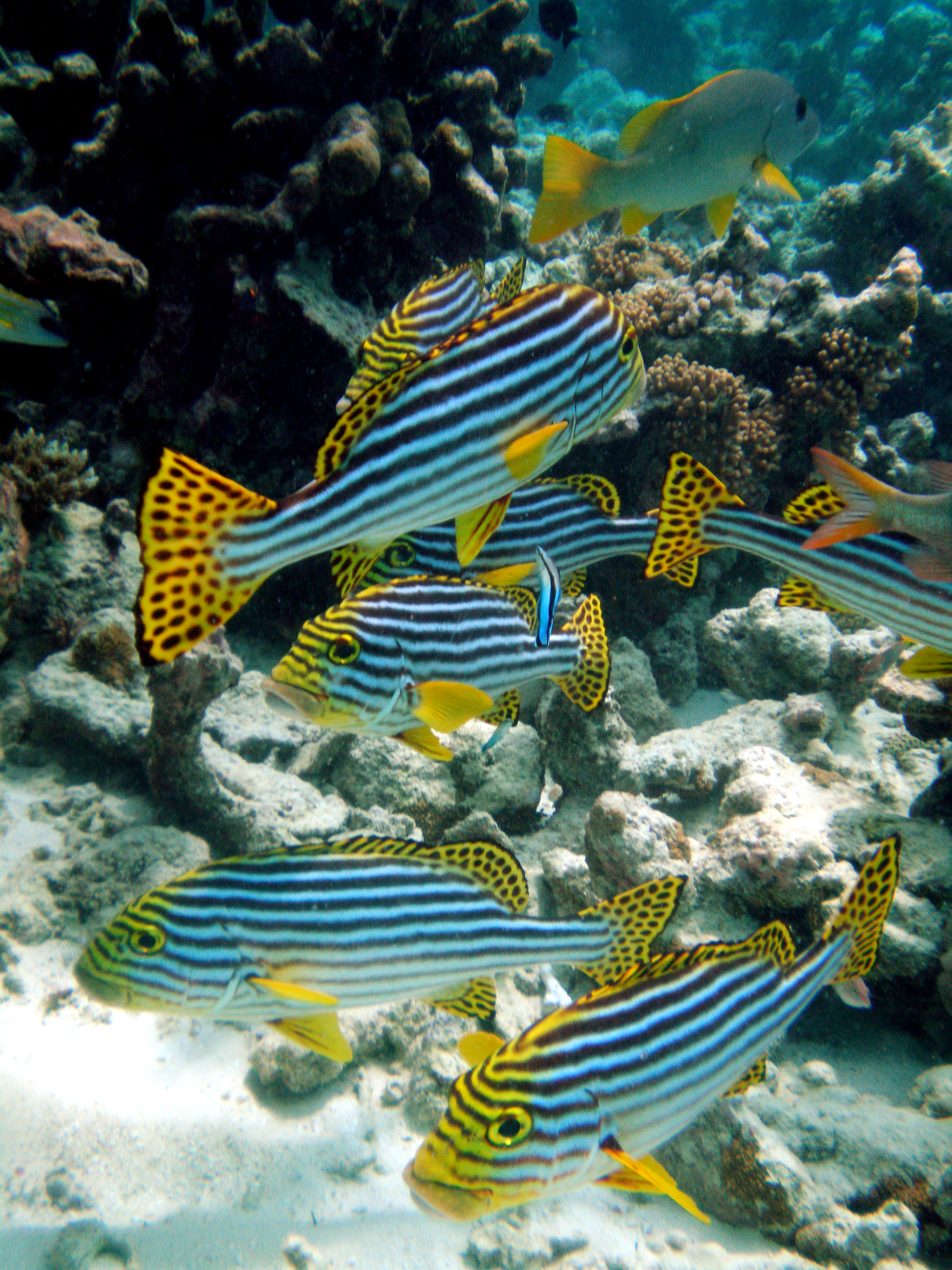
Group in the Maldives

The Indian Ocean oriental sweetlips inhabits shallow, coastal coral reefs, lagoons and seaward reefs at depths of 2 to 25 m (6 ft 7 in to 82 ft 0 in). It is found singly or in small aggregations and tends to be nocturnal. The juveniles may be found in tidepools and in beds of sea grass. It forages at night feeding on small invertebrates such crustaceans, gastropods or annelids, as well as smaller fishes. It is an oviparous species which spawns as distinct pairs.

== Utilisation ==
The Indian Ocean oriental sweetlips is caught by fisheries in much of its range, and is caught using hand nets and by spear fishing and the catch is sold fresh or a small amount of it is preserved as salted fish. It is being trialled for aquaculture. It is an infrequently traded species in the aquarium trade.
