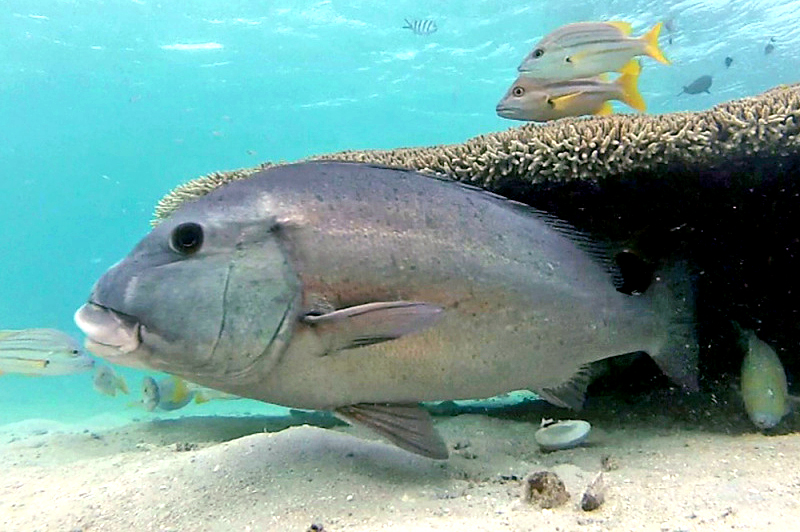

Scientific classification
- Kingdom: Animalia
- Phylum: Chordata
- Class: Actinopterygii
- Division: Teleostei
- Order: Acanthuriformes
- Family: Haemulidae
- Genus: Plectorhinchus
- Species: P. caeruleonothus

Binomial name
- Plectorhinchus caeruleonothus J. W. Johnson & Worthington Wilmer, 2015

= Plectorhinchus caeruleonothus =

Species of fish

Plectorhinchus caeruleonothus, the blue bastard, is a species of ray-finned fish belonging to the subfamily Plectorhinchinae, the sweetlips, one of two subfamilies in the family Haemulidae, the grunts. It was discovered in Australia in 2015.

== Description ==
Plectorhinchus caeruleonothus adults are mostly silvery-grey in colour, but the cheek and the operculum are uniformly bluish-grey. The orbit of the eye and upper edge of the upper jaw are sooty yellow, while the posterior edge of the gill membrane is silvery-grey. The juveniles are blackish brown and marked with 10 uneven, horizontal, slender white stripes on the head and body. The caudal fin is marked with diagonal white bars that converge on the central margin, while the pectoral fins are yellow with a dark brown blotch in the middle of their inner bases. The dorsal fin contains 12 spines and 18-20 soft rays, while the anal fin has 3 spines and 6-7 soft rays. This species attains a maximum total length of 100 cm (39 in).

== Distribution ==
Plectorhinchus caeruleonothus is endemic to Australia. It ranges from Rottnest Island in Western Australia around the northern coast to Lizard Island in Queensland.

== Habitat and biology ==
Plectorhinchus caeruleonothus is found over sand, rubble, and reef substrates, although it prefers intertidal areas or reefs in shallow water. It has been taken as deep as 30 m (98 ft). Larger individuals are solitary, spending the day foraging over quite open areas of sand or silt. These fish have frequently been recorded interacting in highly aggressive conflicts with other conspecifics. Such confrontations involve the individuals coming face-to-face and locking their jaws, as well as participating in prolonged and violent struggles close to the top of the water column.

== Discovery, systematics and naming ==
Plectorhinchus caeruleonothus was previously considered to be a legendary fish which existed only in fishermen's tales. The fish is very difficult to catch. Plectorhinchus caeruleonothus was identified through several features unique to it, such as a distinctive pattern on juveniles and small nostrils. It is thought that the fish likely evolved its tough ways to survive the many sharks and crocodiles that share its habitat in reef waters off northern Australia. It was formally described in 2015 by Jeffrey W. Johnson and Jessica Worthington Wilmer with the type locality given as Boyd Bay, southwest of Weipa in Queensland. Previously, this species was thought to be synonymous with the minstrel sweetlips (Plectorhinchus schotaf) of the western Indian Ocean, as were the sombre sweetlips (Plectorhinchus unicolor) of Japan to northern Australia and Plectorhinchus griseus from India and Sri Lanka, but all are now recognised as valid species The specific name is a compound of caeruleus meaning “blue”, which refers to the blue sheen in life, and nothus meaning “bastard”, reflecting the name given to this species by anglers.

== Utilisation ==
Plectorhinchus caeruleonothus Is sometimes taken as bycatch in commercial fisheries. It is sought after by recreational anglers, mainly due to the difficulty of catching it. The flesh is not regarded as highly palatable.
