= Plectorhinchus ceylonensis =

Conservation status
- Least Concern (IUCN 3.1)

Scientific classification
- Kingdom: Animalia
- Phylum: Chordata
- Class: Actinopterygii
- Order: Acanthuriformes
- Family: Haemulidae
- Genus: Plectorhinchus
- Species: P. ceylonensis

Binomial name
- Plectorhinchus ceylonensis (J. L. B. Smith, 1956)

Synonyms
- Gaterin ceylonensis J. L. B. Smith. 1956

Species of fish

Plectorhinchus ceylonensis, the Sri Lanka sweetlips, is a species of marine ray-finned fish, a sweetlips belonging to the subfamily Plectorhinchinae, one of two subfamilies in the family Haemulidae, the grunts. It is native to the Indian Ocean around Sri Lanka. It inhabits waters over coral reefs at depths from 5 to 20 m (16 to 66 ft). This species is rarely found in the aquarium trade.

== Description ==
Plectorhinchus ceylonensis has thick, fleshy lips and there are 6 pores on the chin but n central pit. It is slaty-grey in colour with a greenish yellow bar running from the eye to the tip of snout. The dorsal fin contains 14 spines and 19 soft rays while the anal fin has 3 spines and 7 soft rays. This species can reach a maximum total length of 44 cm (17 in).

== Distribution ==
Plectorhinchus ceylonensis is found in the central Indian Ocean. Its range covers southeastern India and Sri Lanka north and east into the Andaman Sea, as far as the coast of Bangladesh and Myanmar.

== Habitat and biology ==
Plectorhinchus ceylonensis is found at depths between 5 and 20 m (16 and 66 ft), commonly occurring in the vicinity of shallow sandstone platforms and coastal fringing reefs. It is a social species which shows a tendency to gather in aggregations which may be quite large. It is a carnivorous species which feeds on benthic invertebrates and zooplankton. It is an oviparous species which spawns as distinct pairs.

== Systematics ==
Plectorhinchus ceylonensis was first formally described in 1965 as Gaterin ceylonensis by the South African ichthyologist James Leonard Brierley Smith with the type locality being Sri Lanka. The specific name ceylonensis refers to the old name for Sri Lanka, Ceylon.

== Utilisation ==
Plectorhinchus ceylonensis is fished for around Sri Lanka using handlines and gill nets and the catch is sold fresh. Catch statistics are not reported for this species. It is not an appropriate fish for the home aquarium.
