= Plectorhinchus gibbosus =

Conservation status
- Least Concern (IUCN 3.1)

Scientific classification
- Kingdom: Animalia
- Phylum: Chordata
- Class: Actinopterygii
- Division: Teleostei
- Order: Acanthuriformes
- Family: Haemulidae
- Genus: Plectorhinchus
- Species: P. gibbosus

Binomial name
- Plectorhinchus gibbosus (Lacépède, 1802)

Synonyms
- List: Holocentrus gibbosus Lacépède, 1802; Pristipoma nigrum Cuvier, 1830; Gaterin niger (Cuvier, 1830); Plectorhinchus nigrus (Cuvier, 1830); Pseudopristipoma nigra (Cuvier, 1830); Pseudopristipoma nigrum (Cuvier, 1830); Pseudopristipoma nigrus (Cuvier, 1830); Diagramma crassispinum Rüppell, 1838; Plectorhynchus crassispinus (Rüppell, 1838); Diagramma gibbosus Hombron & Jacquinot, 1853; Plectorhinchus gibbosus (Hombron & Jacquinot, 1853)

Species of fish

Plectorhinchus gibbosus, commonly known as the Harry hotlips, black sweetlips, brown sweetlips, dusky sweetlips, gibbous sweetlips, hairy hotlips or humpback sweetlips, is a species of marine ray-finned fish, a sweetlips belonging to the subfamily Plectorhinchinae, one of two subfamilies in the family Haemulidae, the grunts. It is native to the Western Pacific and Indian Oceans.

== Taxonomy ==
Plectorhinchus gibbosus was first formally described in 1802 as Holocentrus gibbosus by the French naturalist and politician Bernard Germain de Lacépède with the type locality being given as Surinam, erroneously, but is probably Indonesia.

The specific name gibbosus means "humpbacked", a reference to the high body which has a convex dorsal profile.

== Distribution ==
Plectorhinchus gibbosus has a wide Indo-Pacific distribution. It is found along the eastern coast of Africa from Kenya to South Africa and along the southern coast of Asia into the Pacific as far east as Polynesia, north as far as the Ryukyu Islands of southern Japan and south to Australia.

It is also found off the Indian Ocean islands of Socotra, Seychelles, Madagascar and the western Mascarenes. In Australia its range extends from the Ningaloo Reef in Western Australia along the northern coasts and south on the eastern coast as far as Flinders Island in Tasmania, as well as Lord Howe Island and Norfolk Island in the Tasman Sea.

== Description ==
Plectorhinchus gibbosus has been recorded growing up to a total length of 75 cm (30 in). It has fleshy lips which become grossly swollen with age, it has 6 pores on its chin but has no median pit. The dorsal fin contains 14 spines and 15–16 soft rays while the anal fin has 3 spines and 7–8 soft rays.

The overall colour is silvery-grey to brownish with dark edges to the scales, a dusky face, a thin dark bar on the anterior of the operculum which has a black rear margin. The soft rayed part of the dorsal fin, anal fin and caudal fin are dusky.

The juveniles are brownish in colour with a pink or transparent caudal fin and mimic fallen leaves by drifting with the body oriented with their sides parallel to the surface.

== Habitat and biology ==
Plectorhinchus gibbosus occurs at depths of 8 to 25 m (26 to 82 ft) in coastal reefs, over sandbanks, and in the vicinity of estuaries and will enter fresh water. The small juveniles are found along sheltered sandy shorelines where they float on their sides camouflaged as fallen leaves. The adults prefer waters protected by inshore reefs but can also be found offshore in deep water, frequently recorded forming in small aggregations. In captivity they are known to eat crustaceans and other invertebrates and fish. It is an oviparous species which spawns as distinct pairs.

== Utilisation ==
Plectorhinchus gibbosus is caught using handlines and spear with the catch being sold fresh, although a small amount is preserved by salting. It is a highly regarded food fish.
