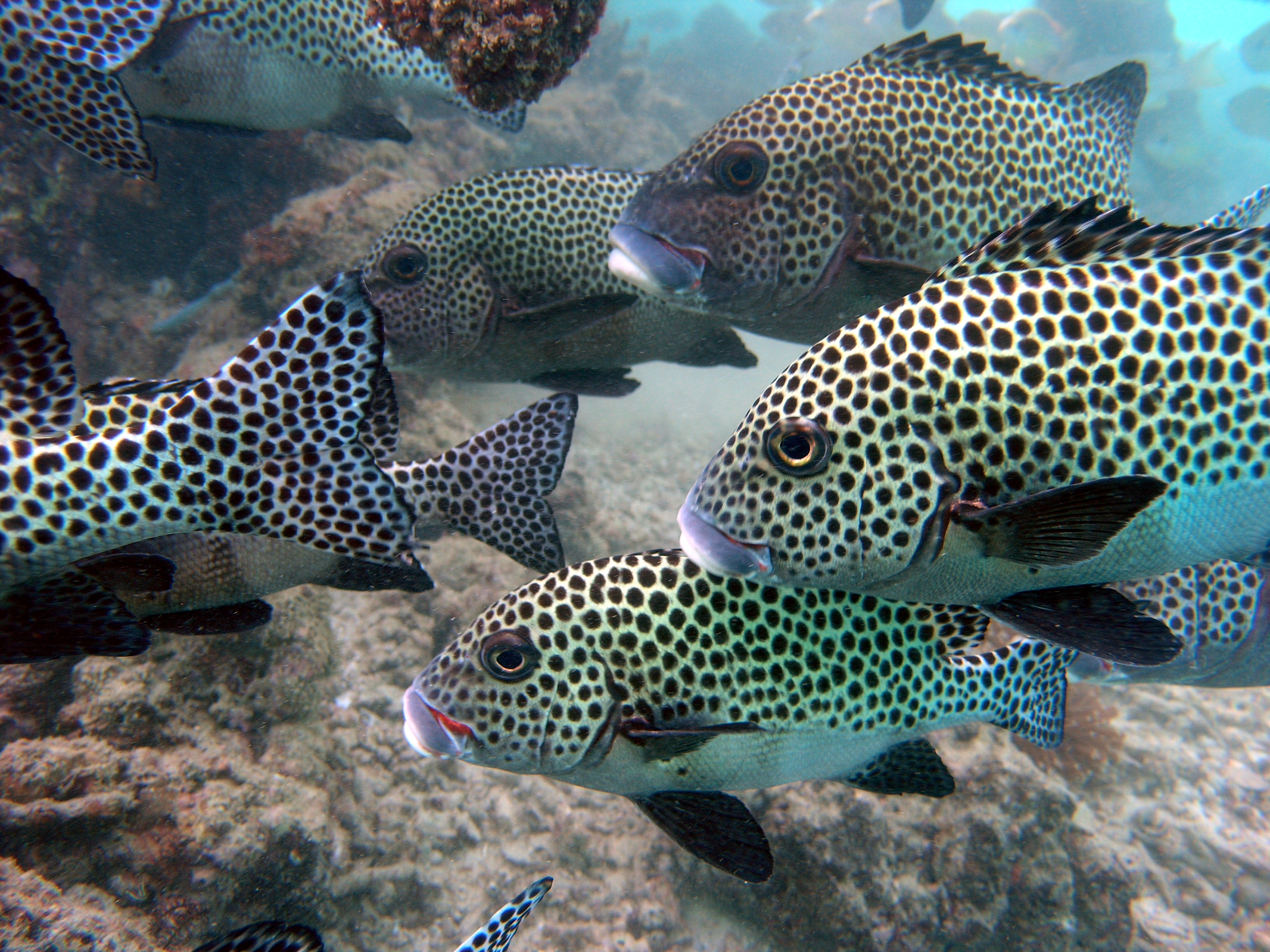

Scientific classification
- Kingdom: Animalia
- Phylum: Chordata
- Class: Actinopterygii
- Division: Teleostei
- Order: Acanthuriformes
- Family: Haemulidae
- Genus: Plectorhinchus
- Species: P. chaetodonoides

Binomial name
- Plectorhinchus chaetodonoides Lacépède, 1801

Synonyms
- Gaterin chaetodonoides (Lacépède, 1801)

= Plectorhinchus chaetodonoides =

Harlequin sweetlips

Species of fish

Plectorhinchus chaetodonoides, the harlequin sweetlips, clown sweetlips, spotted sweetlips or many-spotted sweetlips, is a species of marine ray-finned fish, a sweetlips belonging to the subfamily Plectorhinchinae, one of two subfamilies in the family Haemulidae, the grunts. It is native to the Indo-Pacific region. This species is of minor importance to local commercial fisheries and can be found in the aquarium trade.

== Taxonomy ==
Plectorhinchus chaetodonoides was first formally described in 1801 by the French naturalist Bernard Germain de Lacépède with no type locality given but it is likely to have been somewhere in modern Indonesia.

=== Etymology ===
The specific name chaetodonoides means having the form of Chaetodon which when Lacépède described this species referred to both butterflyfishes and marine angelfishes and is an allusion to the serrated operculum, similar to that of marine angelfish, and the then presumption of a close taxonomic relationship between this species and the genus Chaetodon.

== Distribution ==
Plectorhinchus chaetodonoides is distributed across the eastern Indian Ocean and the western Pacific Ocean from the Maldives and Mauritius east as far as Tonga, north to the Ryukyu Islands and south to the Great Barrier Reef. One was seen off St. Martin in the West Indies in 2007, considered to be probably a deliberately released individual from an aquarium.

== Description ==
Plectorhinchus chaetodonoides has fleshy lips which become moderately swollen as the fish grows, there are 6 pores on the chin but no central pit.< The dorsal fin typically has 12 spines, although rarely it has 11 spines. and 18–20 soft rays, the soft rayed part of the dorsal fin has a height which is roughly equal to the length of its base. The juveniles are brownish with large, discrete creamy white blotches on the body these develop brown spotting as the fish matures. As they grow into adults the coloration slowly develops a greyish background colour broken large, dark brown spots, these spots having a greater diameter of the iris. The maximum recorded total length is 72 cm (28 in), although 60 cm (24 in) is more typical, and the maximum published weight is 7 kg (15 lb). The caudal fin of juveniles is deeply forked and has wide rounded lobes both of which are mostly white marked with a large brown spot, in adults it is much less forked.

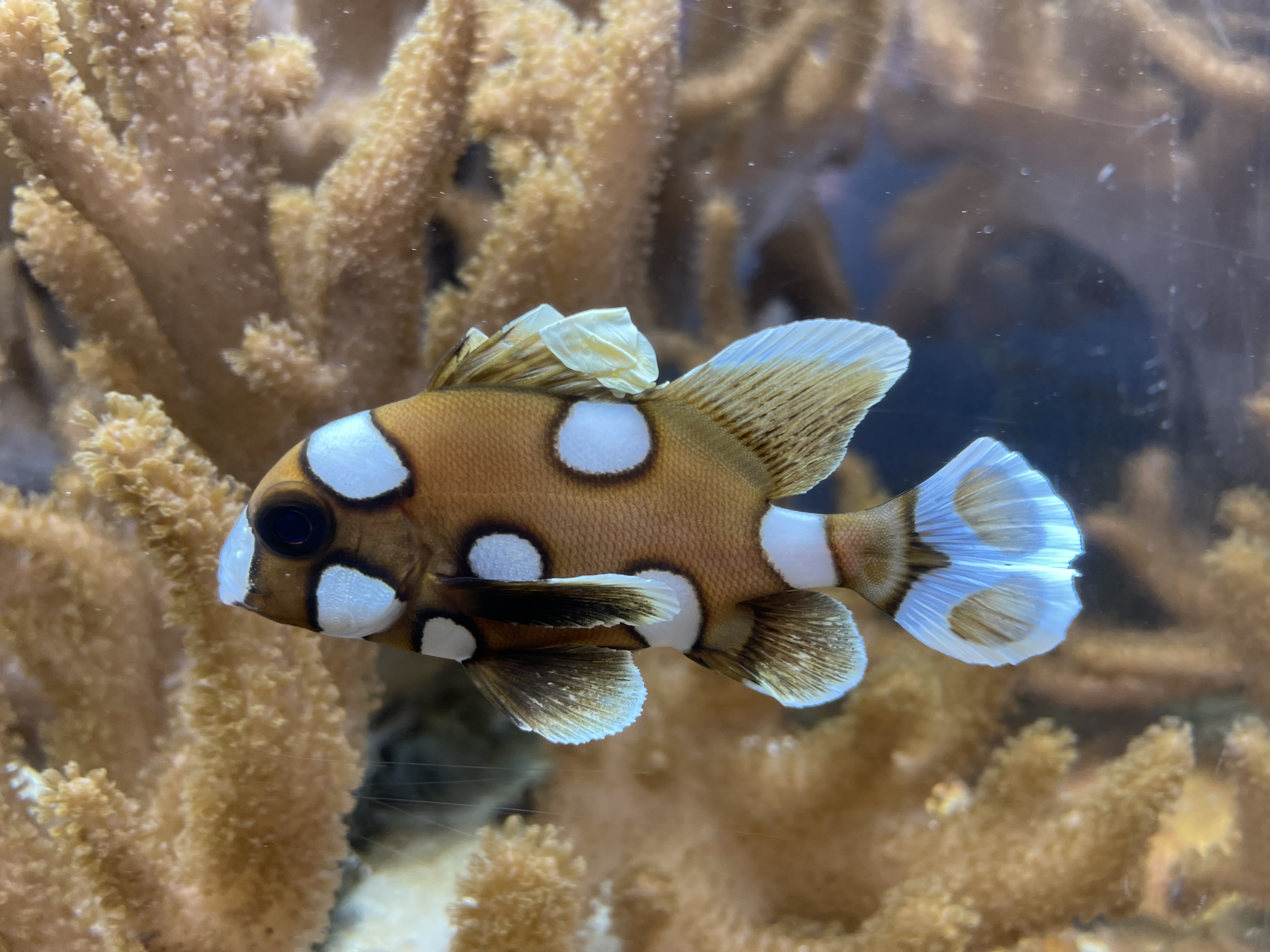
From youngest juvenile (left) to adult (right)

== Habitat and biology ==
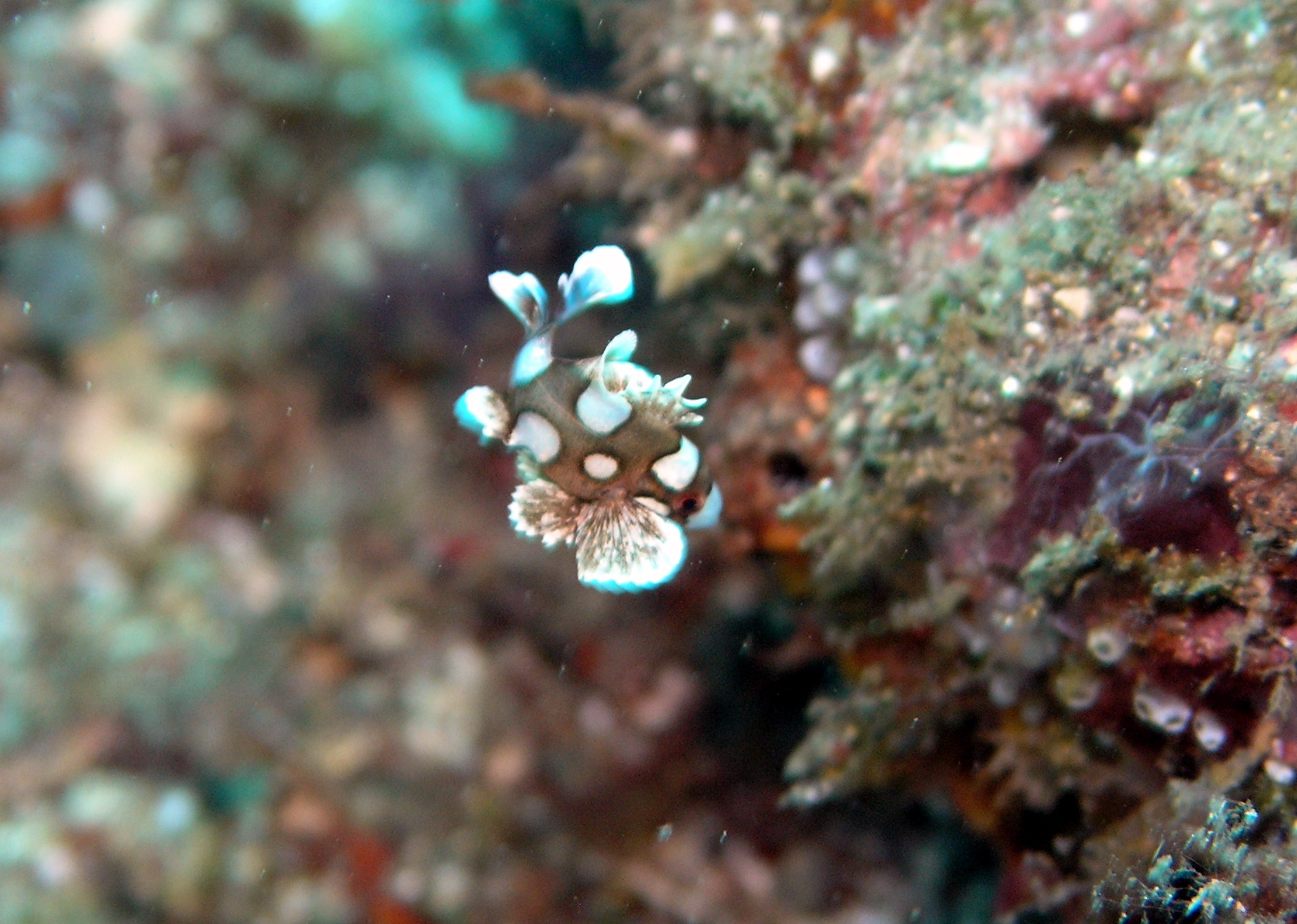
Juvenile harlequin sweetlips mimic the movement of poisonous flatworms.

Plectorhinchus chaetodonoides is found in coral-rich parts of clear lagoons and on seaward reefs. The adults are solitary fish, living in the vicinity of and sheltering beneath ledges or caves during the day. The juveniles are found sheltering in corals. It is a carnivorous species which preys on benthic invertebrates such as crustaceans and molluscs, as well as fishes, which it forages for during the night.

The juveniles typically swim in a head down posture wildly undulating their fins as they swim, a behaviour which may mimic toxic or distasteful platyhelminths or nudibranchs and so provide some protection from predation. It is thought that the juveniles are Batesian mimics of poisonous flatworms.

In the Philippines

== Utilisation ==
Plectorhinchus chaetodonoides are caught using handlines and spear. The fish caught are marketed fresh, although some are preserved by salting. The meat of larger specimens has been described a "coarse and dry". The small, colourful juveniles are collected for the aquarium trade and there may be overexploitation in some areas.
