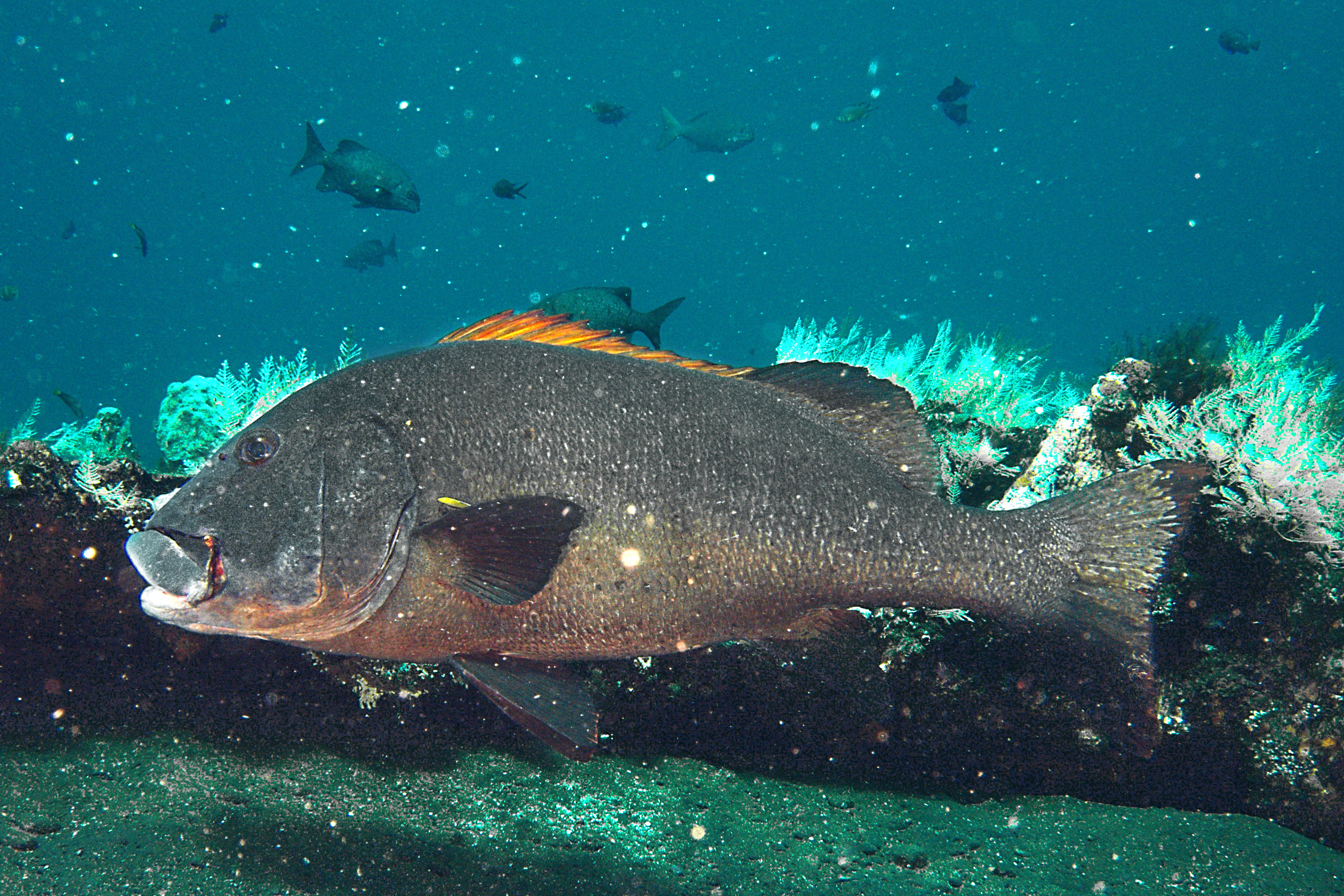

Scientific classification
- Kingdom: Animalia
- Phylum: Chordata
- Class: Actinopterygii
- Division: Teleostei
- Order: Acanthuriformes
- Family: Haemulidae
- Genus: Plectorhinchus
- Species: P. albovittatus

Binomial name
- Plectorhinchus albovittatus (Rüppell, 1838)

Synonyms
- List: Diagramma albovittatum Rüppell, 1838; Gaterin albovittatus (Rüppell, 1838); Diagramma giganteum Günther, 1879; Gaterin harrawayi J. L. B. Smith, 1952; Plectorhinchus harrawayi (J. L. B. Smith, 1952)

= Plectorhinchus albovittatus =

Species of fish

Plectorhinchus albovittatus, the two-striped sweetlips or giant sweetlips, is a species of marine ray-finned fish, a sweetlips belonging to the subfamily Plectorhinchinae, part of the grunt family Haemulidae. It is native to the Indian Ocean and the western Pacific Ocean.

== Systematics ==
Plectorhinchus albovittatus was first formally described in 1838 as Diagramma albovittatum by the German naturalist Eduard Rüppel with the type locality given as Massawa in Eritrea.

The specific name albovittatus means “white striped” and refers to the pattern of the juveniles.

== Distribution ==
Plectorhinchus albovittatus is found in the Indo-West Pacific region from the coast of East Africa and the Red Sea east into Polynesia, north to Japan and south as far as New South Wales.

== Description ==
Juvenile

Plectorhinchus albovittatus has fleshy lips which become more swollen as the fish ages. There are 6 pores on the chin but there is no central pit. The dorsal fin contains 12 or 13, typically 13, spines and 16–20 soft rays while the anal fin has 3 spines and 7 soft rays. The juveniles are brown in colour, paler on the lower body than the upper body, and they are marked with 3 slender white bands one down the snout, the second starting on the nape and running to the tail and the third on upper part of the dorsal fin. The spined part of the dorsal fin is pale brown or cream, with a thin dark brown margin, the soft rayed part of the dorsal fin is dark brown with a pale horizontal stripe and a thinner stripe above it, both these bands extend to the rear margin of the dorsal fin. The caudal fin is dark brown below and white above with darker tips and a dark brown band running obliquely across its upper lobe. The anal fin is dark brown with its rear rays paler. The pectoral fins vary in colour from hyaline to very light brown, the pelvic fins have sooty brown tips. The adults are overall grey to grey-brown in colour on the upper body and flanks with the pectoral, pelvic, and anal fins being blackish while the lower lobe and upper tip of the caudal fin is black. The front part of the soft-rayed part of the dorsal fin is black while the spined part of the dorsal fin is dusky to black, The lower lip and the chin are white with the abdomen being silvery grey to white in colour. This species attains a maximum standard length of 100 cm (39 in)>

== Habitat and biology ==
Plectorhinchus albovittatus is found in clear lagoons and over seaward reefs, although the juveniles occur in brackish water or shallow turbid coastal regions. The adults are normally solitary, although they are rarely observed in pairs and may be found on deep reefs or in the vicinity of sea mounts. In Palau this species has been observed aggregating to spawn annually either side of the new moon in April or May. It is an oviparous species which spawns as distinct pairs. They spend the daylight sheltering among the deeper sections of surge channels through the reef.

== Utilisation ==
Plectorhinchus albovittatus is caught using handlines and by spearfishing. The larger fish are sold fresh, a small proportion of the catch is preserved as salted fish.
