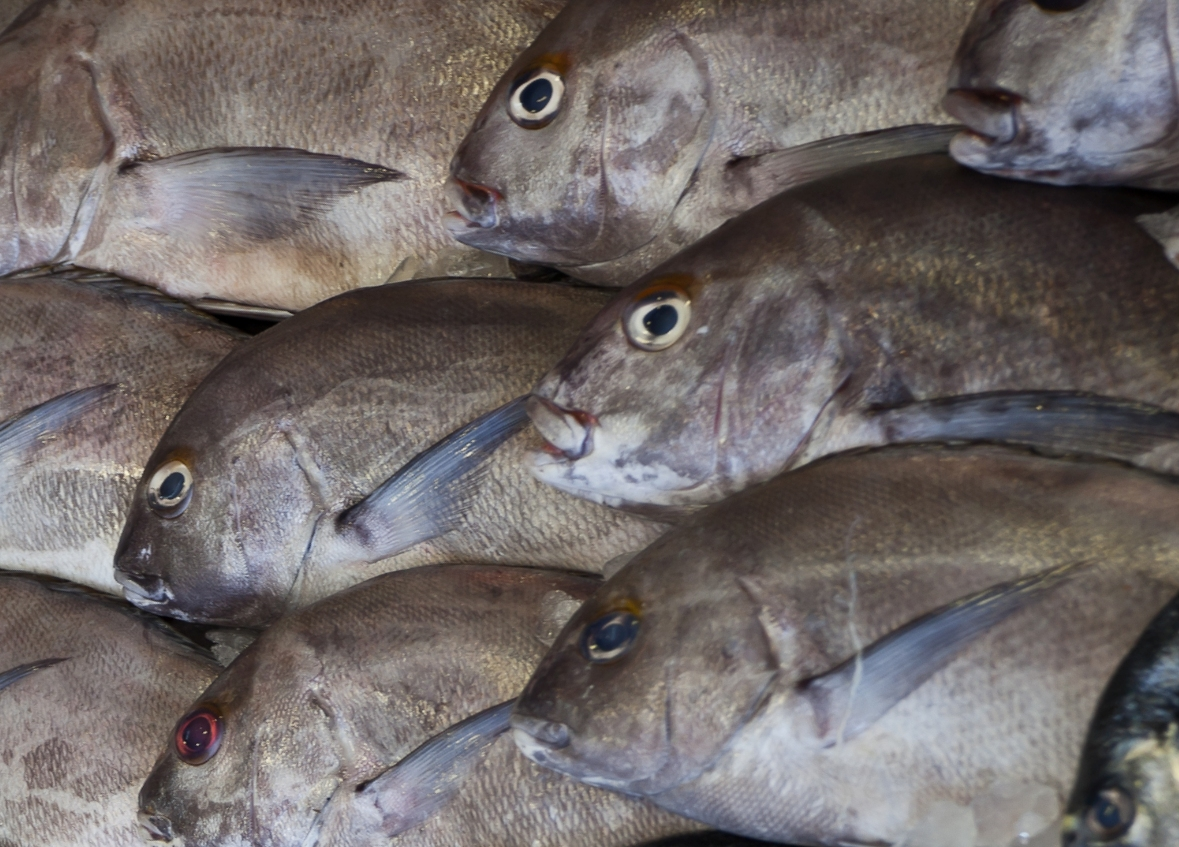

Conservation status
- Data Deficient (IUCN 3.1)

Scientific classification
- Kingdom: Animalia
- Phylum: Chordata
- Class: Actinopterygii
- Order: Acanthuriformes
- Family: Haemulidae
- Genus: Plectorhinchus
- Species: P. mediterraneus

Binomial name
- Plectorhinchus mediterraneus (Guichenot, 1850)
- Distribution of Rubberlip grunt

Synonyms
- Diagramma mediterraneum Guichenot, 1850; Parapristipoma mediterraneum (Guichenot, 1850)

= Rubberlip grunt =

Species of fish

The rubberlip grunt (Plectorhinchus mediterraneus) is a species of marine ray-finned fish, a sweetlips belonging to the subfamily Plectorhinchinae, one of two subfamilies in the family Haemulidae, the grunts. It is native to the eastern Atlantic Ocean.

== Description ==
The rubberlip grunt has an oblong compressed body and has a standard length which is around two and a half times its depth. The head is relatively small with a long snout and a relatively small, slightly oblique mouth which has moderately thick lips. The continuous dorsal fin has 10-13 spines and 17-20 soft rays while the anal fin contains 3 spines and 8-9 soft rays. The caudal fin is emarginate and has pointed lobes. They are largely greyish-brown in colour, marked with paler stripes and with a dark, rather unclear, stripe starting immediately underneath the soft-rayed part of the dorsal fin and extending back to the caudal peduncle. The abdomen is paler, almost white. The maximum recorded standard length is 80 cm (31 in), although 60 cm (24 in) is more typical, and the highest recorded weight is 7.9 kg (17 lb).

== Distribution ==
The rubbberlip grunt is found in the eastern Atlantic Ocean and the western Mediterranean Sea. In the eastern Atlantic its range extends from southern Portugal to central Namibia, including São Tomé and Príncipe but it is absent from the Cape Verde Islands, the Azores or Madeira and its presence in the Canary Islands is considered doubtful. In the western Mediterranean reaches the Adriatic Sea and may be present in Greece and Egyptian but these identifications are considered to be doubtful, the records may refer to misidentified Pomadasys stridens, a Lessepsian migrant from the Red Sea into the Mediterranean via the Suez Canal.

== Habitat and biology ==
The rubberlip grunt is a demersal species which is found at depths between 1 and 180 m (3 ft 3 in and 590 ft 7 in) over substrates consisting of sand or mud, although in the northern Adriatic Sea it is associated with artificial reefs. It feeds on both zooplankton and benthic animals. It is an oviparous species which spawns as distinct pairs.

== Systematics ==
The rubberlip grunt was first formally described in 1850 as Diagramma mediterraneum by the French zoologist Antoine Alphonse Guichenot with the type locality being given as Algeria. The specific name mediterraneus means "of the Mediterranean" and refers to its presence in that sea.

== Utilisation ==
The rubberlip grunt is an abundant species which can make up 40% of the catch of trawlers in some areas. Between 1997 and 2010 the catch off Morocco increased from 285 t (280 long tons; 314 short tons) to 9,093 t (8,949 long tons; 10,023 short tons) before declining in 2011 and 2012 and the FAO consider the stock to be overexploited. The methods used to catch this species includes pelagic and bottom trawls, fixed bottom nets and kook and line. The catch is either sold fresh or preserved by drying or salting.
