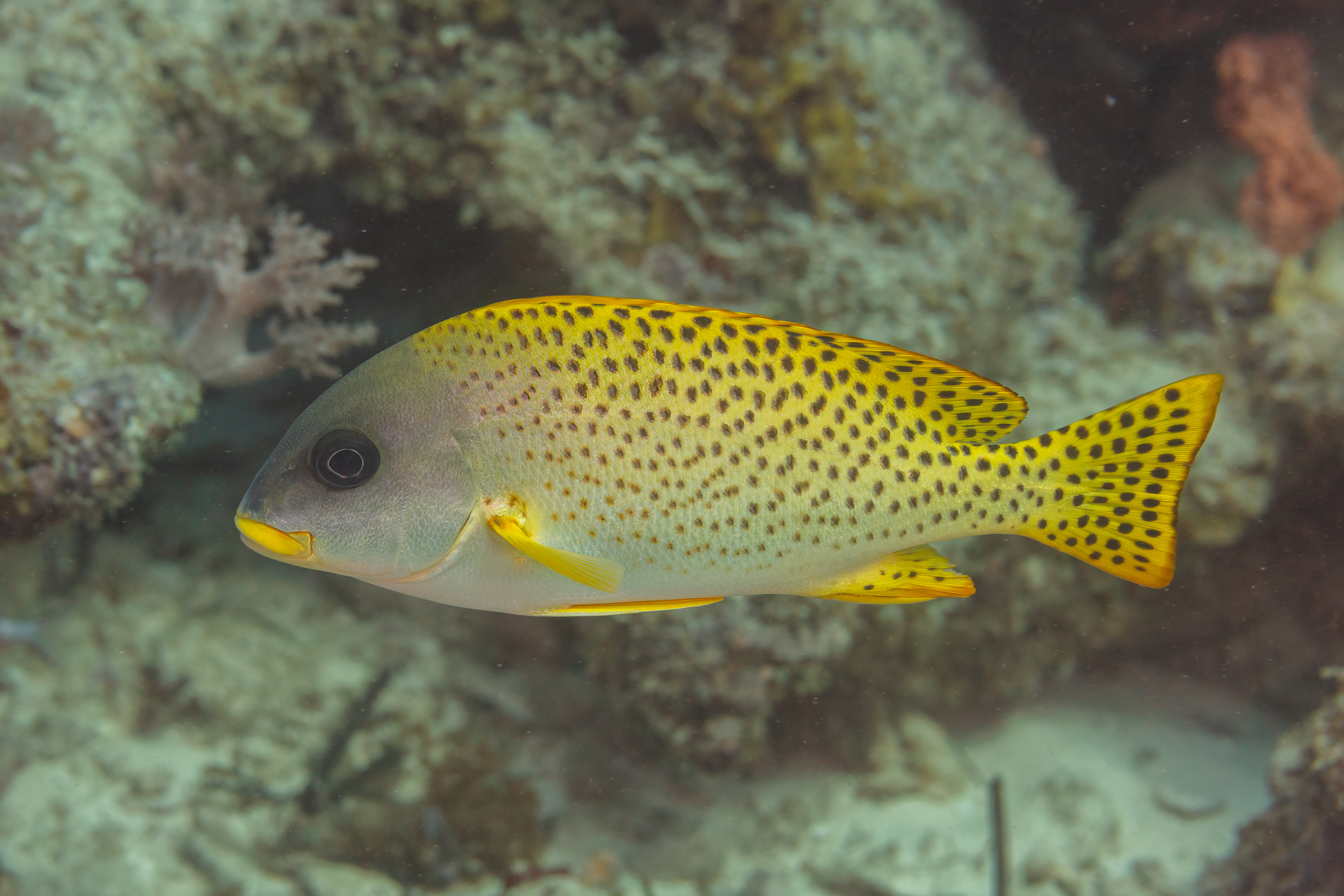
- Plectorhinchus gaterinus from Red Sea
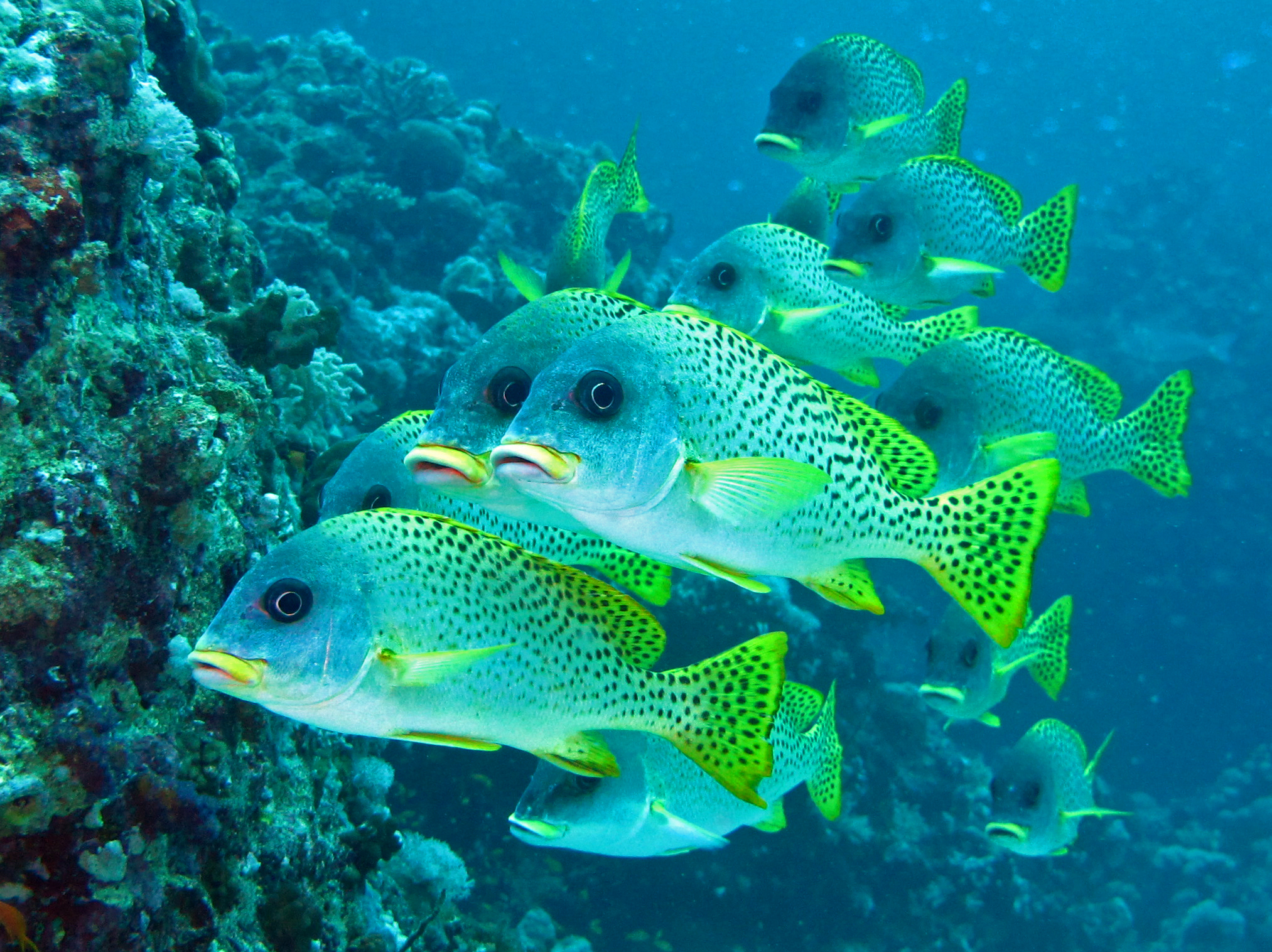
- Plectorhinchus gaterinus. A small group from Red Sea

Conservation status
- Least Concern (IUCN 3.1)

Scientific classification
- Kingdom: Animalia
- Phylum: Chordata
- Class: Actinopterygii
- Order: Acanthuriformes
- Family: Haemulidae
- Genus: Plectorhinchus
- Species: P. gaterinus

Binomial name
- Plectorhinchus gaterinus (Forsskål, 1775)

Synonyms
- Gaterin gaterinus (Forsskål, 1775); Sciaena abumgaterin Forsskål, 1775; Sciaena gaterina Forsskål, 1775

= Plectorhinchus gaterinus =

Species of fish

Plectorhinchus gaterinus, commonly known as the blackspotted rubberlip or African grunt, is a species of marine ray-finned fish, a sweetlips belonging to the subfamily Plectorhinchinae, one of two subfamilies in the family Haemulidae, the grunts. It is found in the western Indian Ocean.

== Description ==
Plectorhinchus gaterinus has fleshy lips but these do not have a swollen appearance. The chin has 6 pores but lacks a median pit. Its pelvic fins are longer than its pectoral fins. The predominant colour is yellowish grey with a greenish back and yellowish belly. The body and fins are marked with rows of dark grey or black-brown spots. The juveniles are light silver-grey and have yellow fins and 5 to 7 brown horizontal bands which split up into lines of spots once the fish grows to a standard length of 10 to 12 cm (3.9 to 4.7 in). The dorsal fin has 13 spines and 19-20 soft rays and the anal fin contains 3 spines and 7 soft rays. This species attains a maximum total length of 50 cm (20 in), although 35 cm (14 in) is more typical.

== Distribution ==
Plectorhinchus gaterinus is found in the Western Indian Ocean. It occurs along the eastern coast of Africa from KwaZulu Natal north into the Red Sea as far north as the Gulf of Aqaba. It is also found in the Sea of Oman and the Persian Gulf and around the islands of the Seychelles, Mauritius, Madagascar, Réunion and Comoro Islands. A juvenile was recovered from the gut of a European squid (Loligo vulgaris) in the Aegean Sea which may indicate Lessepsian migration through the Suez Canal but this is thought unlikely.

== Habitat and biology ==
Plectorhinchus gaterinus is found at depths of 5 to 55 m (16 to 180 ft) on coastal reefs, sand banks and in the vicinity of estuaries. It is frequently found in large aggregations below ledges or along reef slopes during the day. The juveniles often occur in beds of sea grass. They feed on mainly on smaller fishes and crustaceans. A spawning aggregation has been observed in the Persian Gulf off Kuwait. It is an oviparous species which spawns as distinct pairs.

== Systematics ==
Plectorhinchus gaterinus was first formally described in 1775 as Sciaena gaterina by the Danish zoologist Johan Christian Fabricius with the type locality being Jeddah. Fishbase attributes the description to Peter Forskål but Catalog of Fishes suggests that Forskål published Fabricius's description posthumously in Descriptiones animalium which was in turn published after Forskål's death by Carsten Niebuhr. The specific name gaterinus is derived from the local Arabic name for this species on the Red Sea coast of Saudi Arabia, gaterin.

== Utilisation ==
Plectorhinchus gaterinus is fished throughout its range using handlines and gill nets and the catch is sold fresh. Catch statistics are not reported for this species. The flesh is nor regarded highly as it has an iodoform taste. The juveniles are fished for the aquarium trade.
