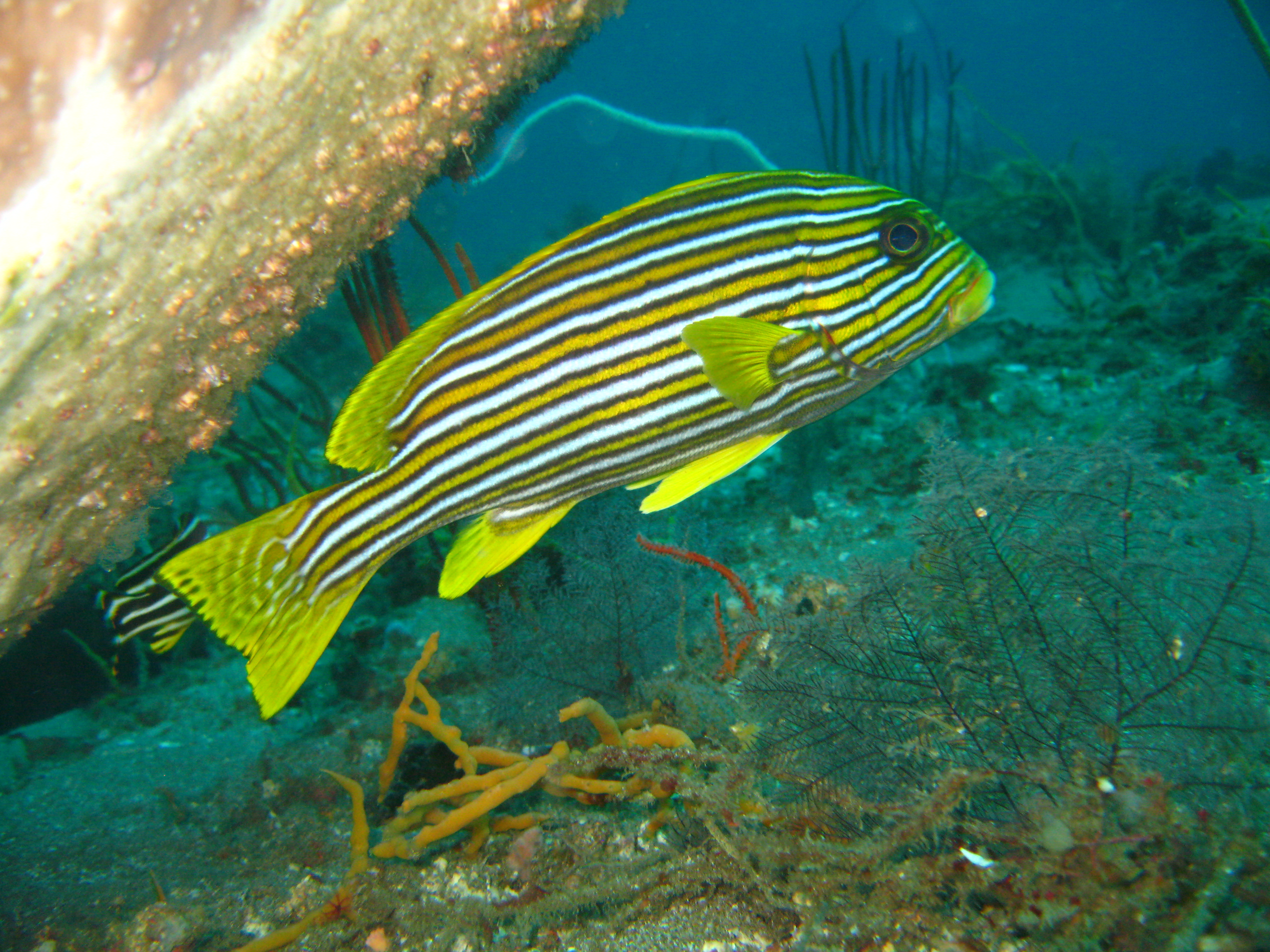
- Ribboned sweetlips in the Philippines

Conservation status
- Least Concern (IUCN 3.1)

Scientific classification
- Kingdom: Animalia
- Phylum: Chordata
- Class: Actinopterygii
- Order: Acanthuriformes
- Family: Haemulidae
- Genus: Plectorhinchus
- Species: P. polytaenia

Binomial name
- Plectorhinchus polytaenia (Bleeker, 1853)

Synonyms
- Diagramma polytaenia Bleeker, 1853

= Ribboned sweetlips =

Species of fish

Plectorhinchus polytaenia, the ribboned sweetlips, also known as Tesone di mare or yellow-ribbon sweetlips, is a species of marine ray-finned fish, a sweetlips belonging to the subfamily Plectorhinchinae, one of two subfamilies in the family Haemulidae, the grunts. It is native to the Indian Ocean and the western Pacific Ocean.

== Description ==
The ribboned sweetlips has fleshy lips which become moderately swollen as the fish ages. There are 6 pores on its chin bit there is no median pit. The dorsal fin contains 12-13 spines and 19-22 soft rays while the anal fin has 3 spines and 7-8 soft rays. They have a background colour which is brown to yellowish grey broken by 5 to 9 quite thin grey or white horizontal stripes edged with dark brown on the body and extending around the snout, The fins are yellow with darker stripes on the soft-rayed part of the dorsal fin, the caudal fin and the pectoral fin, these fade with age and in the oldest fish that are absent. The eyes and the lips are yellowish while the inside of the mouth is bright red and the chin is white. The juveniles less stripes on their orange-brown bodies, the most obvious being a central black band. This species attains a maximum total length of 50 cm (20 in).

== Distribution ==
The ribboned sweetlips is found in the Indo-Pacific region. Its range extends from the west coast of India to the Malay Archipelago, the Philippines, New Guinea and east as far as the Solomon Islands south to north-western Australia.

== Habitat and biology ==
The ribboned sweetlips is found at depths between 5 and 40 m (16 and 131 ft) on coastal and seaward reefs. The adults prefer deep slopes which are exposed to currents where there is a rich growth of benthic invertebrates. The juveniles are typically found on more sheltered reefs close to the adults' habitat. They are normally solitary but may gather in small or large aggregations to rest during the day, these disperse over the reef at night, foraging for small invertebrates such crustaceans, gastropods or annelids, as well as smaller fishes. It is an oviparous species which spawns as distinct pairs.

== Systematics ==
The ribboned sweetlips was first formally described as Diagramma polytaenia in 1853 by the Dutch ichthyologist, herpetologist and physician Pieter Bleeker with the type locality given as Makassar on Sulawesi in Indonesia. The specific name, polytaenia means "many banded", a reference to the bold striped pattern of adults.

== Utilisation ==
The ribboned sweetlips is caught by fisheries throughout the area in which it occurs, despite being an uncommon species. It is rarely sold in India. It is fished for using hand nets and by spear fishing and the catch is sold fresh or a small amount of it is preserved as salted fish. The juveniles sometimes appear in the aquarium trade.

== Gallery ==
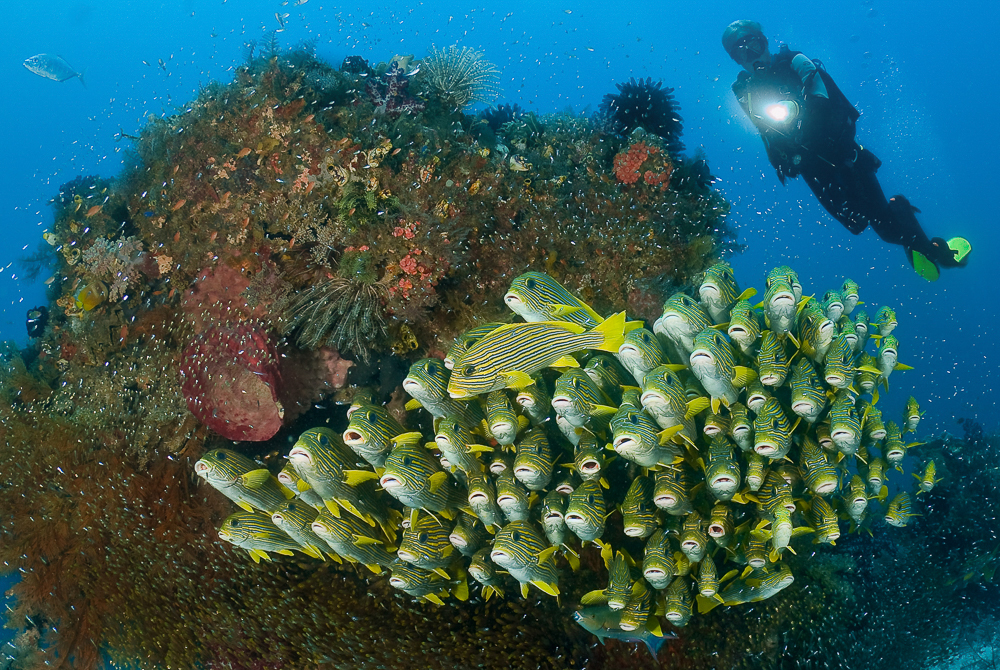
Schooling Sweetlips at Raja Ampat Papua, 2010

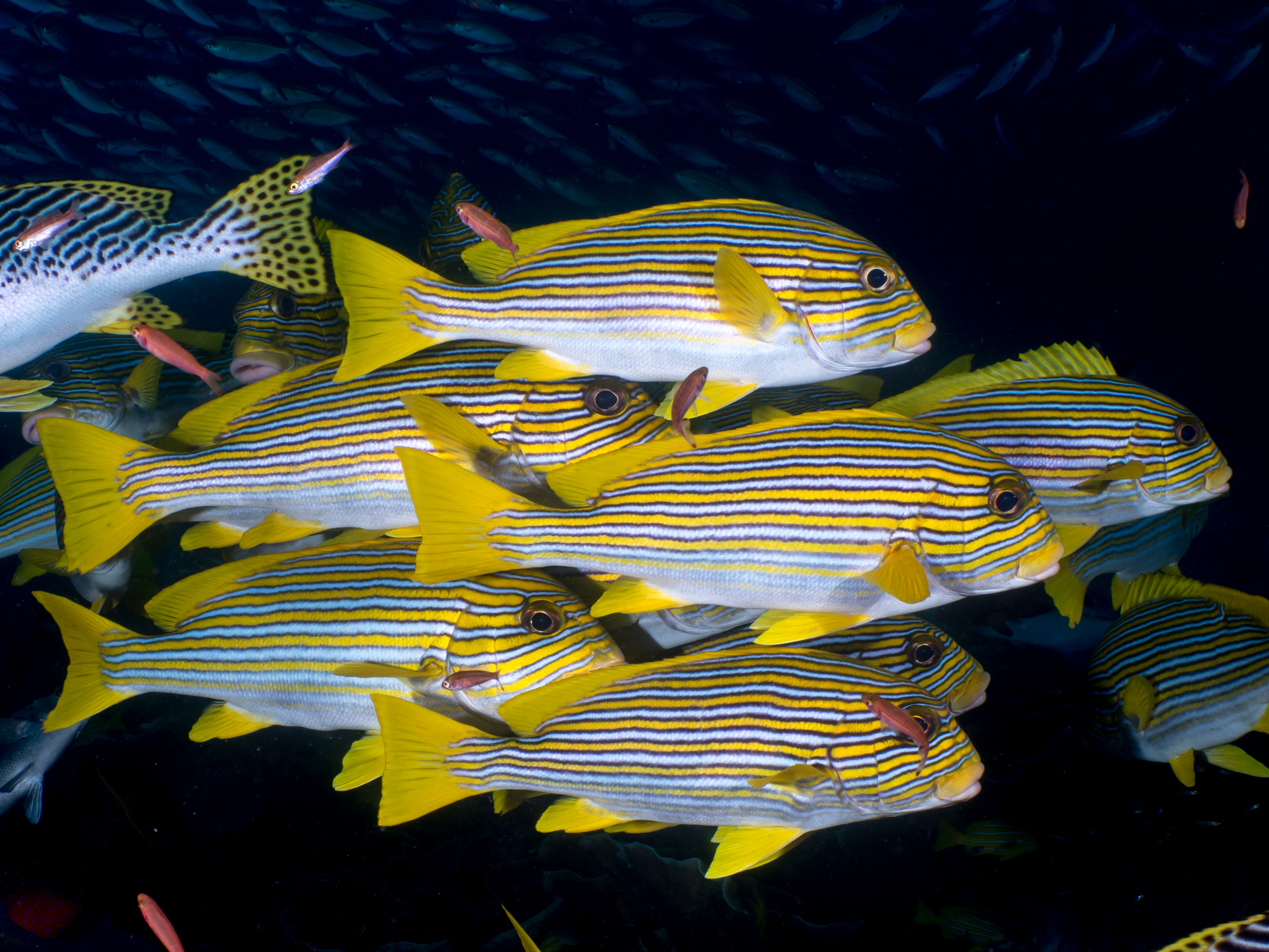
Sweetlips at Raja Ampat Papua, 2020

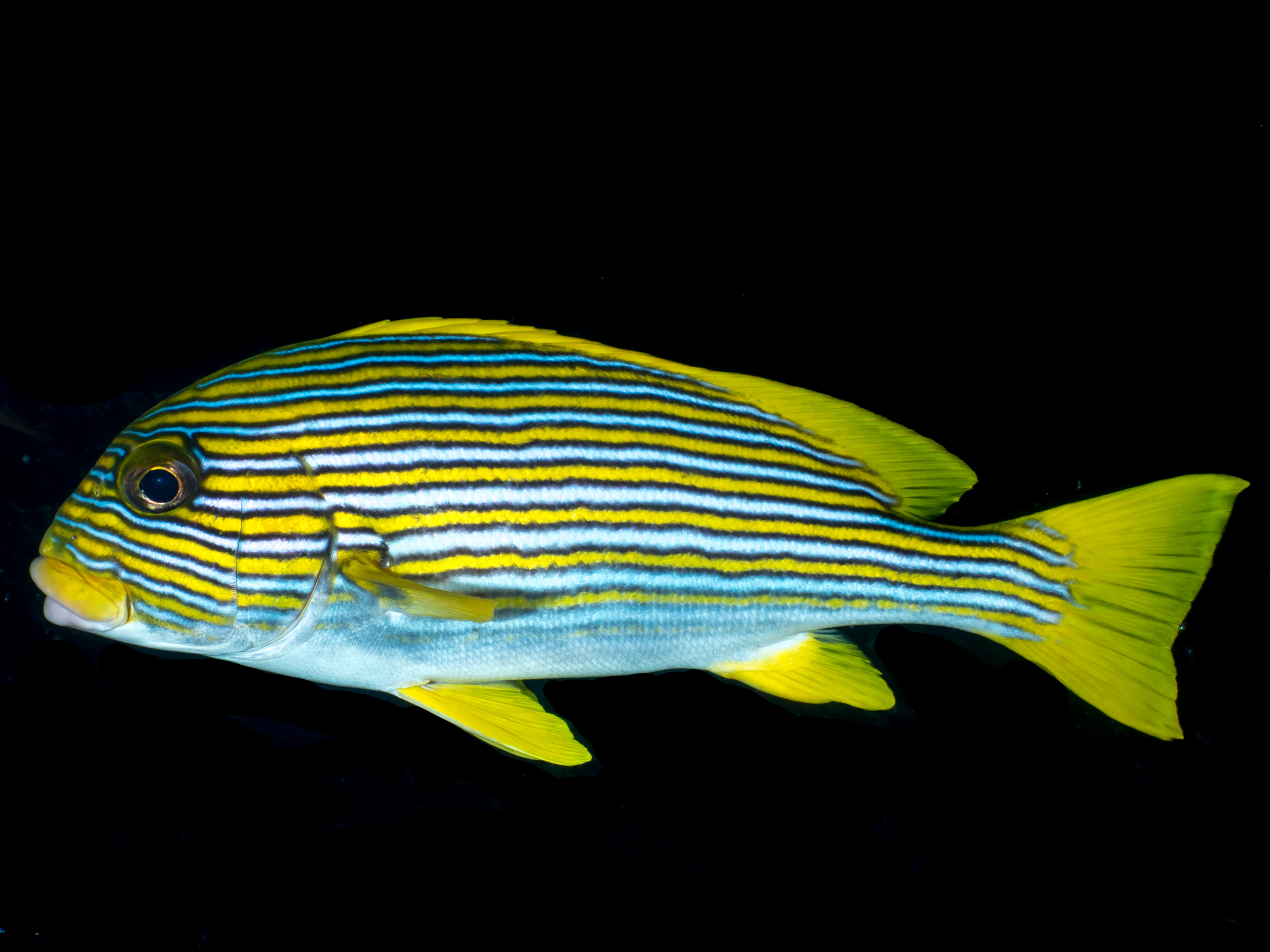
Full body of Sweetlips at Raja Ampat Papua, 2020

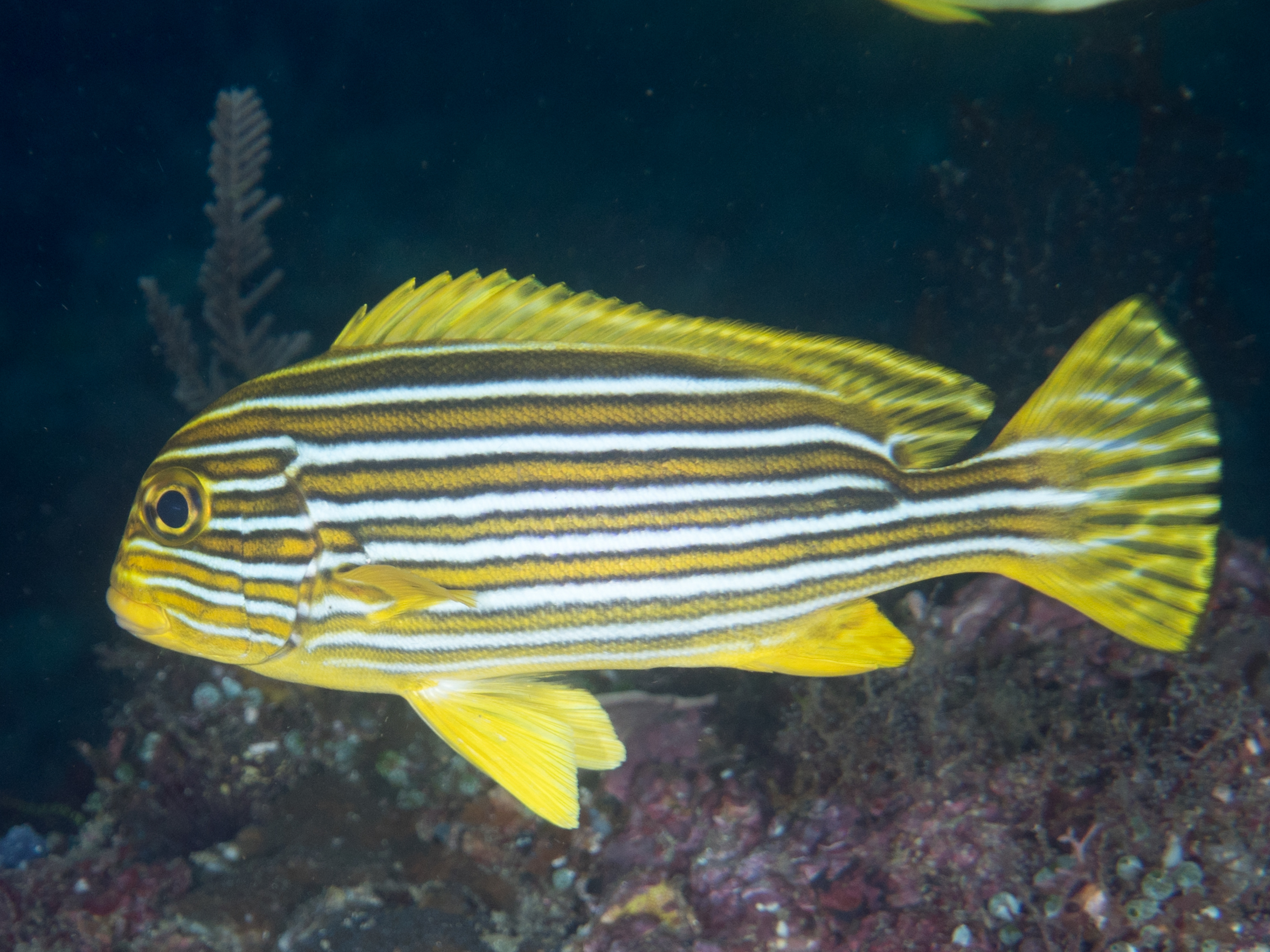
Full body of Sweetlips at Morotai Indonesia, 2019
