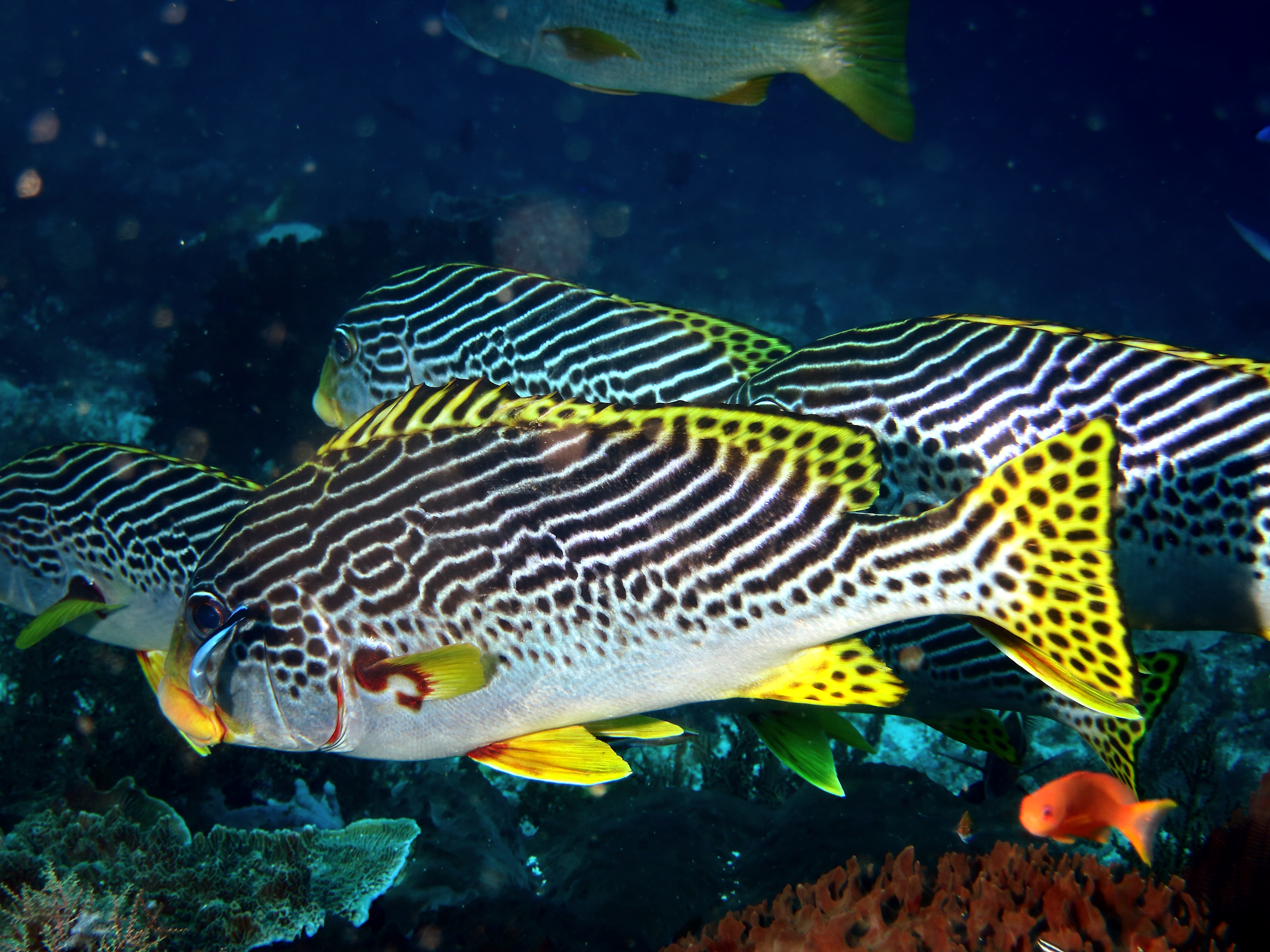

Scientific classification
- Kingdom: Animalia
- Phylum: Chordata
- Class: Actinopterygii
- Division: Teleostei
- Order: Acanthuriformes
- Family: Haemulidae
- Genus: Plectorhinchus
- Species: P. lineatus

Binomial name
- Plectorhinchus lineatus (Linnaeus, 1758)

Synonyms
- List: Perca lineata Linnaeus, 1758; Lutjanus pentagramma Lacépède, 1802; Diagramma goldmanni Bleeker, 1853; Plectorhinchus goldmanni (Bleeker, 1853); Diagramma radja Bleeker, 1853; Diagramma haematochir Bleeker, 1854; Gaterin gaterinoides J. L. B. Smith, 1962; Plectorhinchus gaterinoides (J. L. B. Smith, 1962)

= Plectorhinchus lineatus =

Species of fish

Plectorhinchus lineatus, also known as the yellowbanded sweetlips, oblique-banded sweetlips, diagonal-banded sweetlips, Goldman's sweetlips, lined blubber-lips, lined sweetlips, many-lined sweetlips, striped sweetlips and yellowband sweetlips, is a species of marine ray-finned fish, a sweetlips belonging to the subfamily Plectorhinchinae, one of two subfamilies in the family Haemulidae, the grunts. It inhabits coral reefs of the western Pacific Ocean, where it occurs at depths from 1 to 35 m (3.3 to 114.8 ft).

== Systematics ==
Plectorhinchus lineatus was first formally described in 1758 by Linnaeus in the 10th edition of the Systema Naturae, he gave it the name Perca lineata.

Its specific name lineatus means "lined", presumably referring to many dark bars on the body, horizontal on juveniles and subadults, diagonal on adults.

== Distribution ==
Plectorhinchus lineatus is found in the eastern Indian Ocean and western Pacific Ocean. Its range extends from Indonesia east to Philippines and New Ireland, north to the Ryukyu Islands and Ogasawara Islands, south to New Caledonia and Australia.

In Australia it is found at Scott Reef in Western Australia, Ashmore Reef in the Timor Sea and along the Great Barrier Reef as far south as the Capricorn Islands and the Gold Coast Seaway in Queensland.

== Description ==
Plectorhinchus lineatus has been recorded growing up to a total length of 72 cm (28 in). It fleshy lips which become moderately swollen with age, it has 6 pores on its chin but has no median pit. The dorsal fin contains 12-13 spines and 18-19 soft rays while the anal fin has 3 spines and 7-8 soft rays.

The overall colour is light grey which becomes white on the belly. It has prominent yellow lips and the upper part of the body is marked with a large number of broken, diagonal black stripes. The fins are yellow, the caudal, anal and dorsal fins have black spots and the pelvic fins have red spots at their bases.

The juveniles have a few horizontal to slightly angled dark brown bands, these break up as the fish grows until the colour of the body looks dark chocolate brown above, broken up by a web of thin white lines running over the back. with continued growth the wide brown bars on the lower flanks break up into spots, which shrink farther as the fish grows.

== Habitat and biology ==
Plectorhinchus lineatus occurs in deep waters, at depths between 1 and 35 m (3 ft 3 in and 114 ft 10 in), in both the inner and the outer reefs. Here it may be encountered either singly or in groups along coral slopes in clear water. The juveniles are solitary and are found on shallow, sheltered reefs. Typically nocturnal, they forage on open areas of sand and in beds of sea grass for benthic invertebrates during the night and resting during the day. Spawning aggregations have been noted off Palau around the new moon, this oviparous species forms pairs to spawn. During the day they can often be found resting near coral brommies, columnar outcrops of coral which are often exposed at low tide.

== Utilisation ==
Plectorhinchus lineatus is caught using handlines and spear with the catch being sold fresh, although a small amount is preserved by salting.

== Gallery ==
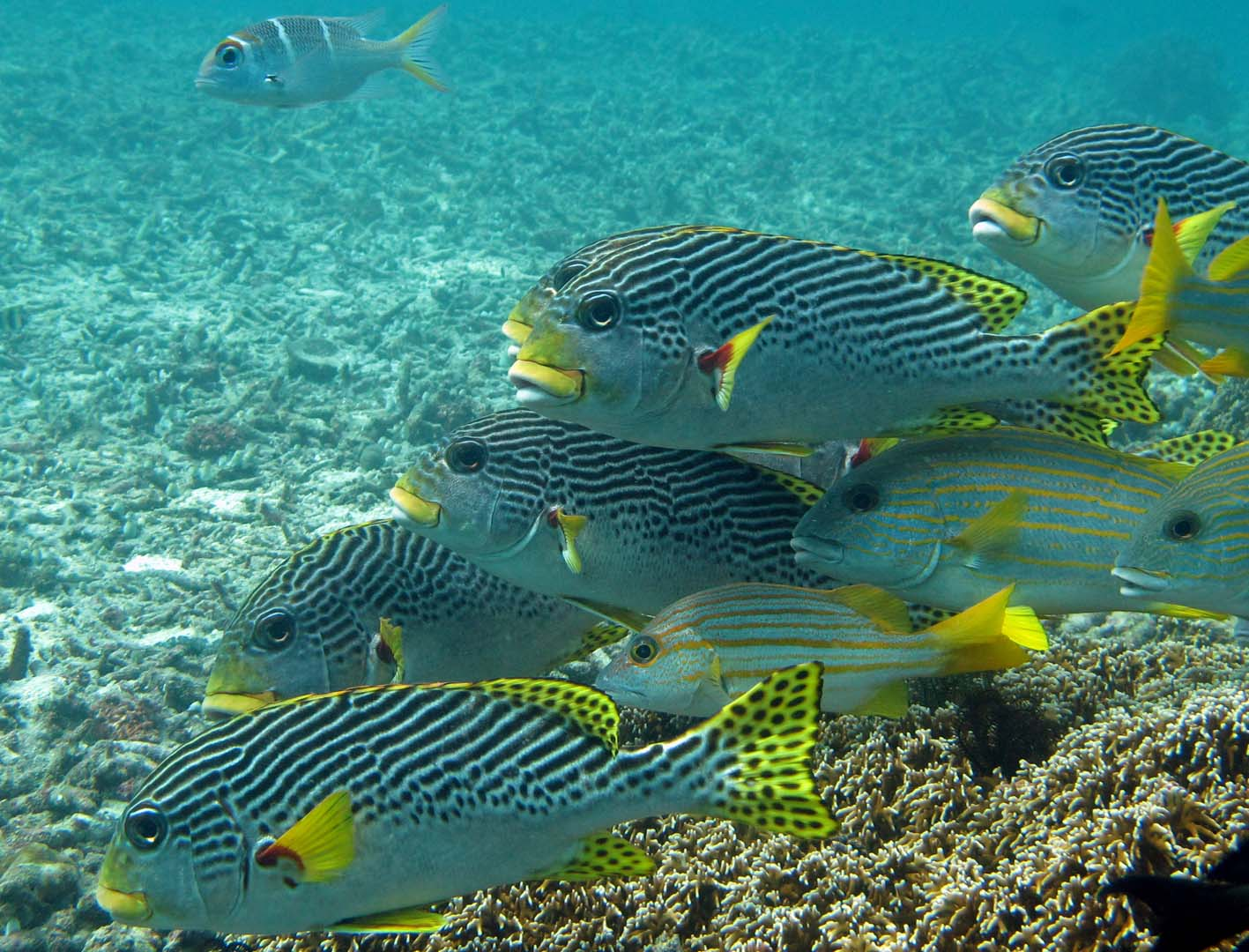
shoal in Raja Ampat, 2010

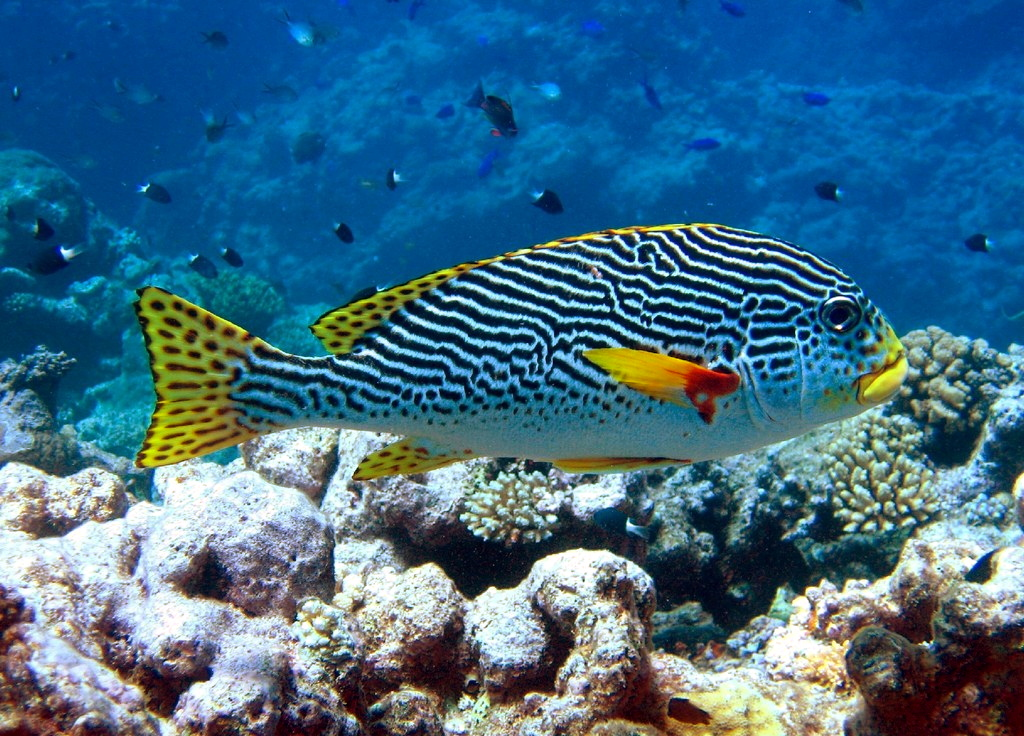
At North Horn, Osprey Reef, Coral Sea

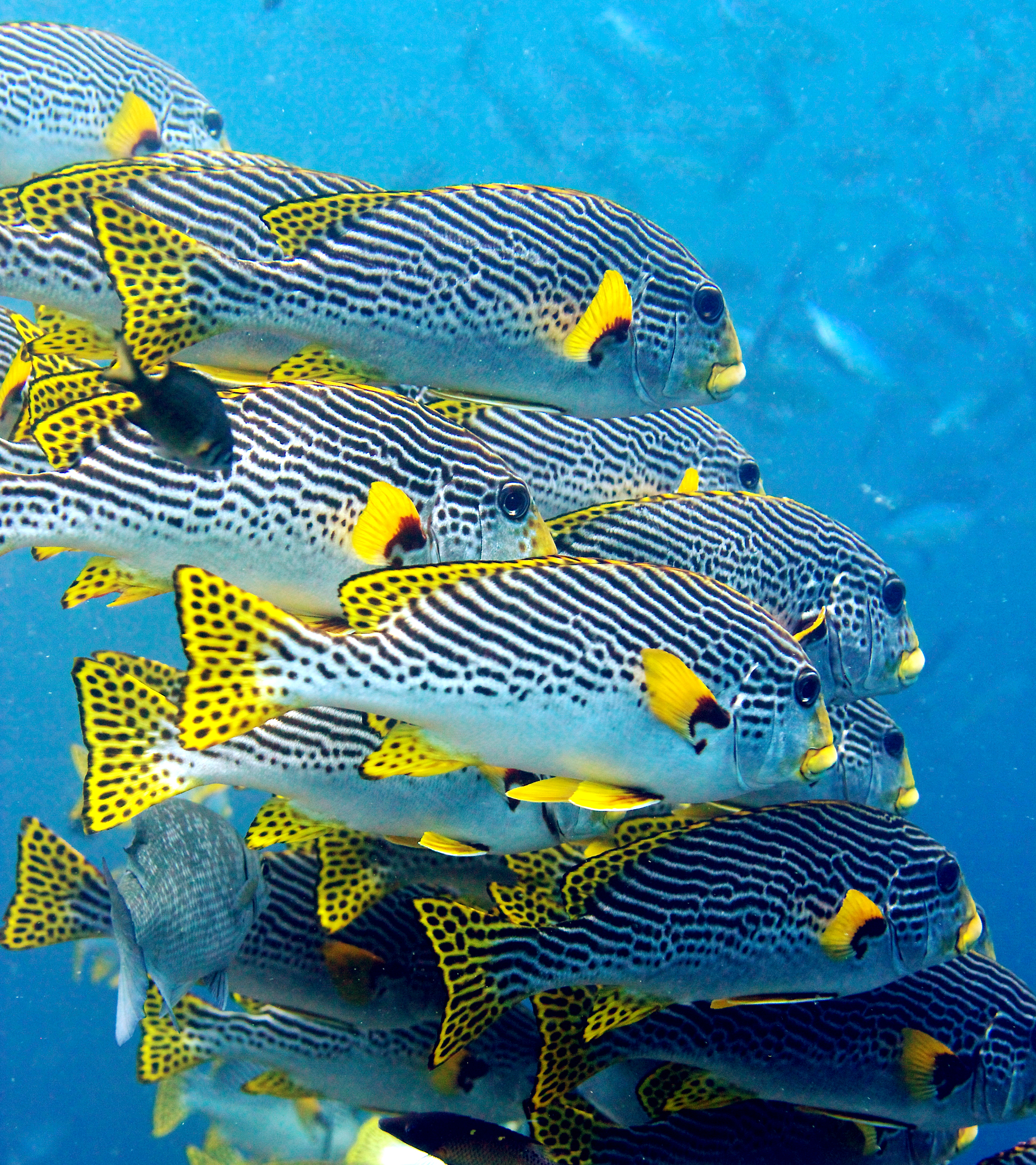
shoal

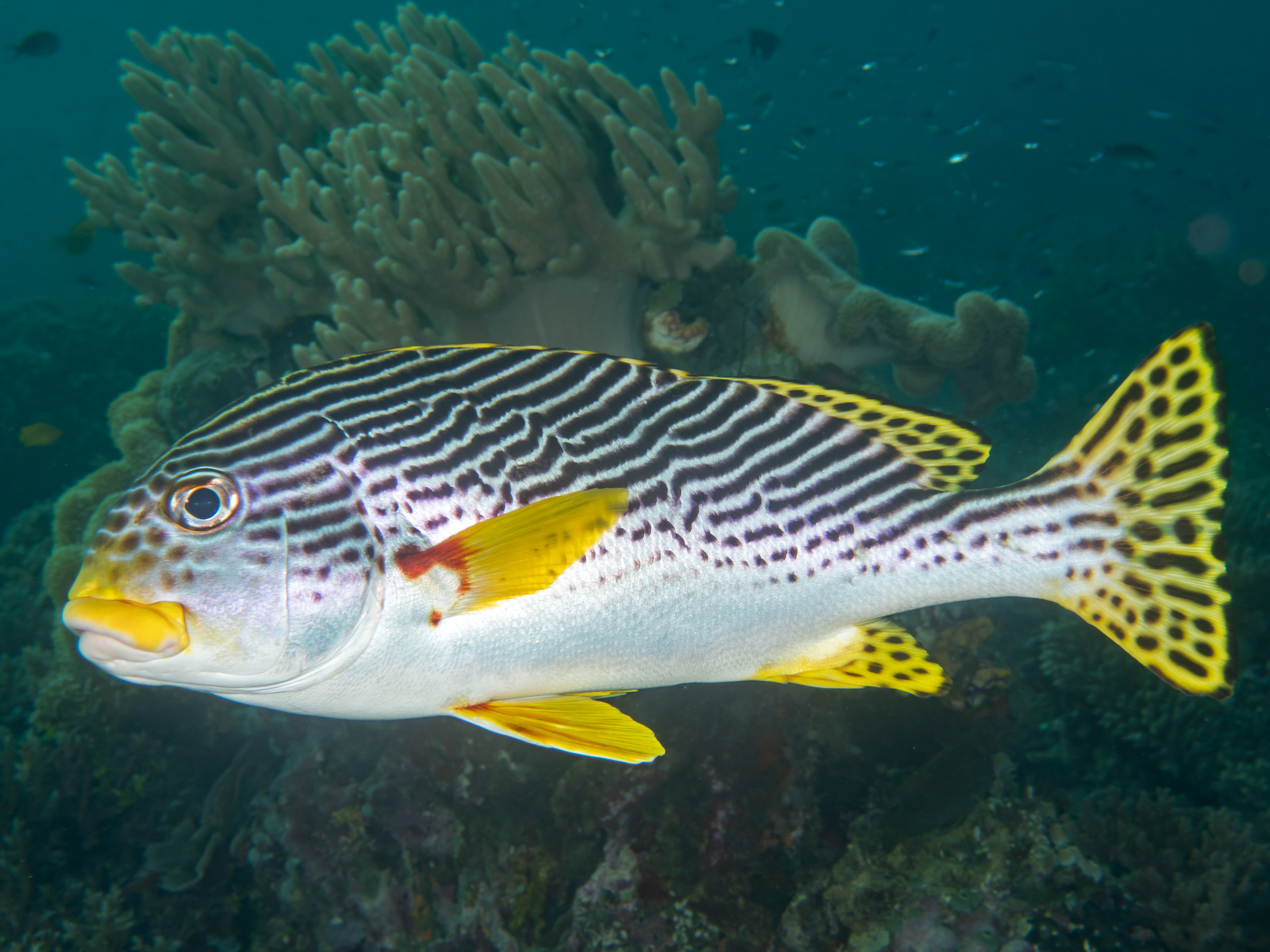
Close up in Raja Ampat

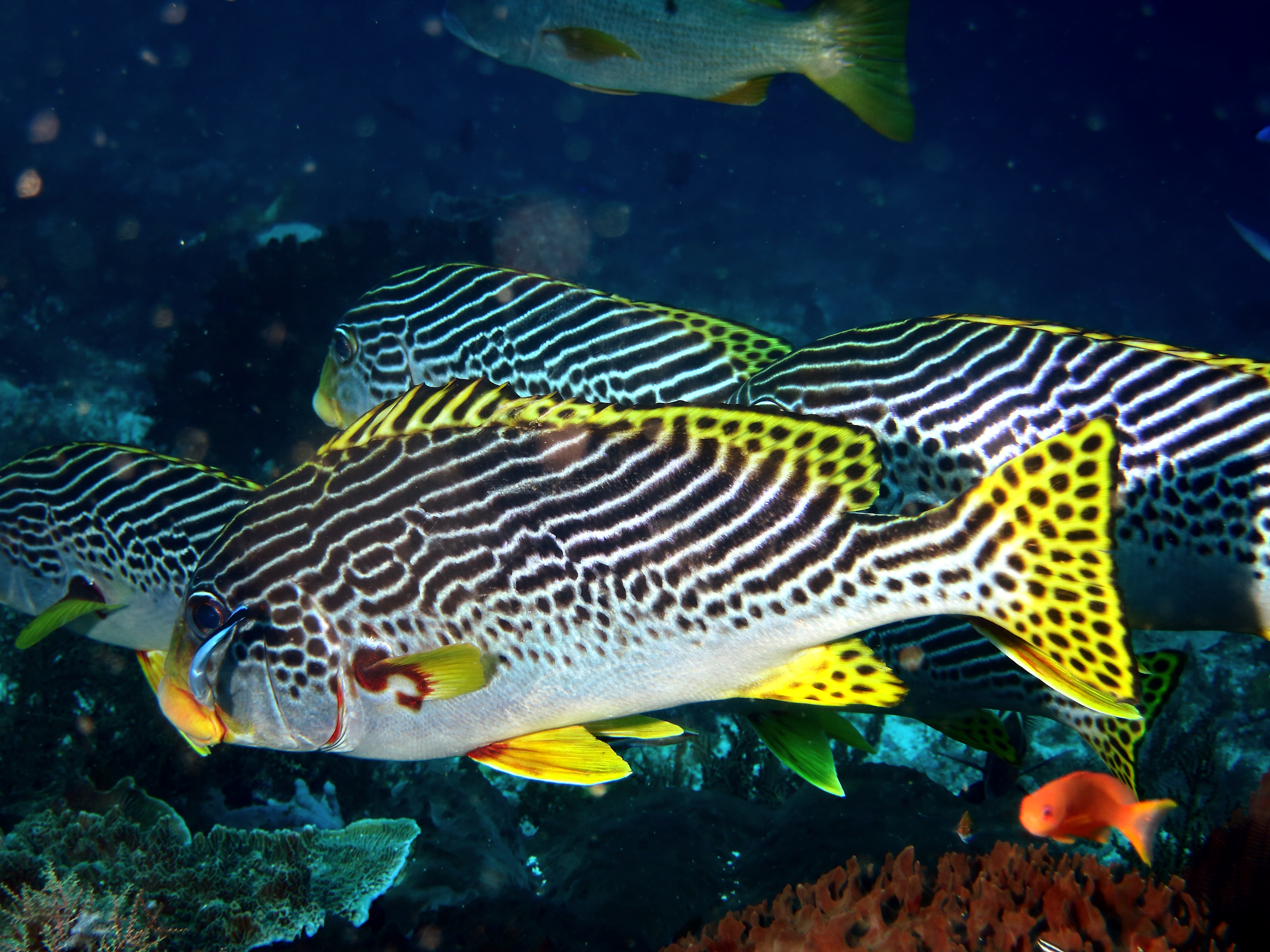
shoal

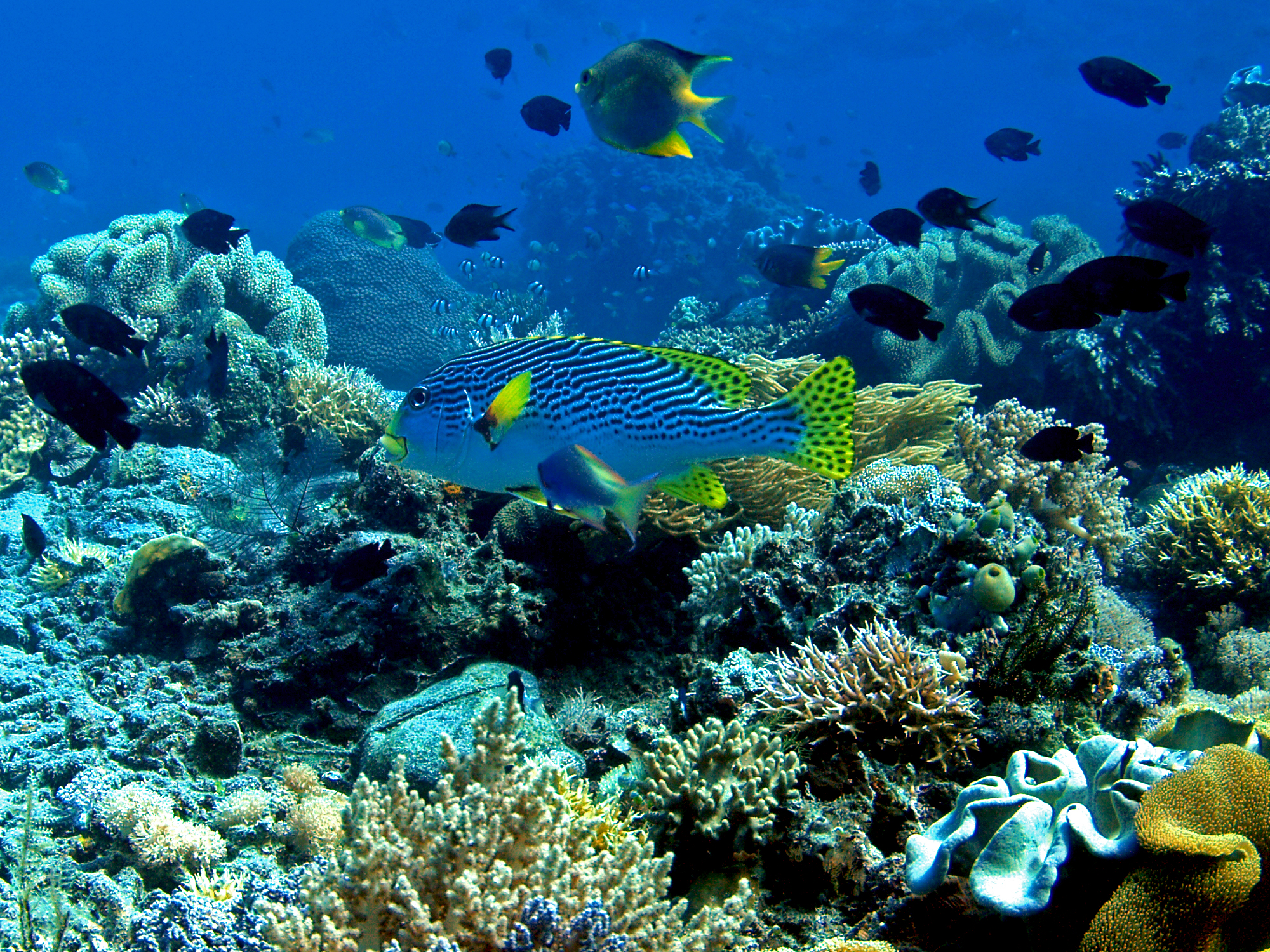
Near Umakaduak Timor-Leste
