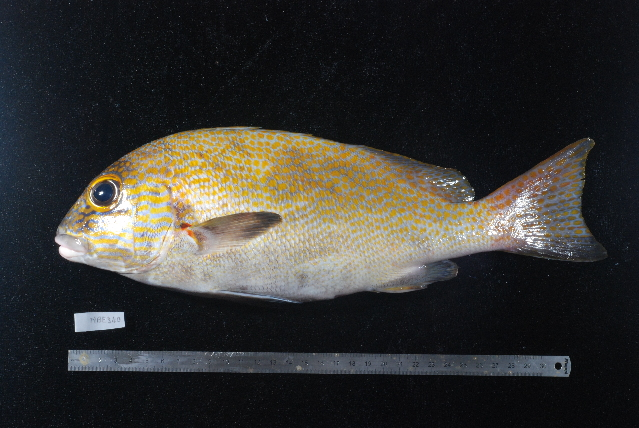

Conservation status
- Least Concern (IUCN 3.1)

Scientific classification
- Kingdom: Animalia
- Phylum: Chordata
- Class: Actinopterygii
- Order: Acanthuriformes
- Family: Haemulidae
- Genus: Plectorhinchus
- Species: P. flavomaculatus

Binomial name
- Plectorhinchus flavomaculatus G. Cuvier, 1830

= Plectorhinchus flavomaculatus =

Species of fish

Plectorhinchus flavomaculatus is a species of ray-finned fish in the Haemulidae family. It has many common names, including lemonfish, goldspotted sweetlips, lemon sweetlips, and yellowspotted thicklip.

The International Union for Conservation of Nature named this species as being of "least concern" in terms of conservation efforts.
