= Plectorhinchus =

Plectorhinchus Temporal range: 23–0 Ma Miocene to Present
- Plectorhinchus chaetodonoides

Scientific classification
- Kingdom: Animalia
- Phylum: Chordata
- Class: Actinopterygii
- Division: Teleostei
- Order: Acanthuriformes
- Family: Haemulidae
- Subfamily: Plectorhinchinae
- Genus: Plectorhinchus; Lacépède, 1801

Type species
- Plectorhinchus chaetodonoides Lacépède, 1801

Synonyms
- List: Euelatichthys Fowler, 1904; Gaterin Forsskål, 1775; Leitectus Smith, 1952; Pluchus Smith, 1949; Pseudohelotes Guimarães, 1882; Pseudopristipoma Sauvage, 1880; Spilotichthys Fowler, 1904

Genus of ray-finned fishes

Plectorhinchus is a genus of marine ray-finned fish, sweetlips belonging to the subfamily Plectorhinchinae which is one of two subfamilies in the family Haemulidae which also includes the grunts. The species in this genus are found in fresh, brackish, and salt waters.

== Taxonomy ==
The genus Plectorhinchus is paraphyletic as the genus Diagramma is nested deeply within it.

== Description and characteristics ==
These fish have big, fleshy lips and tend to live on coral reefs in the Indo-Pacific in small groups or pairs. They will often associate with other fishes of similar species; several species of sweetlips sometimes swim together. They are usually seen in clusters in nooks and crannies or under overhangs. At nightfall, they venture from their shelters to seek out their bottom-dwelling invertebrate prey, such as bristleworms, shrimps, and small crabs.

Sweetlips colouring and patterning changes throughout their lives. For example, Plectorhinchus polytaenia develops more stripes with age. Juvenile sweetlips generally look quite different from the adults, and often live solitary lives on shallower reef sections. Juveniles may be banded or spotted and are usually a completely different colour from the adults of their species. Small juveniles have an undulating swimming pattern, possibly mimicking poisonous flatworms as a means of predator avoidance.

== Species ==
These are the currently recognized species in this genus:

Species	Common name
Plectorhinchus albovittatus (Rüppell, 1838)	Giant sweetlips
Plectorhinchus caeruleonothus J. W. Johnson & Worthington Wilmer, 2015	Blue bastard
Plectorhinchus ceylonensis (J. L. B. Smith, 1956)	Sri Lanka sweetlips
Plectorhinchus chaetodonoides Lacépède, 1801	Harlequin sweetlips
Plectorhinchus chrysotaenia (Bleeker, 1855)	Yellow-striped sweetlips
Plectorhinchus chubbi (Regan, 1919)	Dusky rubberlip
Plectorhinchus cinctus (Temminck & Schlegel, 1843)	Crescent sweetlips
Plectorhinchus diagrammus (Linnaeus, 1758)	Striped sweetlips
Plectorhinchus faetela (Forsskål, 1775)	
Plectorhinchus flavomaculatus (G. Cuvier, 1830)	Lemonfish
Plectorhinchus gaterinus (Forsskål, 1775)	Blackspotted rubberlip
Plectorhinchus gibbosus (Lacépède, 1802)	Harry hotlips
Plectorhinchus griseus (G. Cuvier, 1830)	
Plectorhinchus lessonii (G. Cuvier, 1830)	Lesson's thicklip
Plectorhinchus lineata (Linnaeus, 1758)	Yellowbanded sweetlips
Plectorhinchus macrolepis (Boulenger, 1899)	Biglip grunt
Plectorhinchus macrospilus Satapoomin & J. E. Randall, 2000	Largespot sweetlips
Plectorhinchus makranensis Damadi, Moghaddam, Ghassemzadeh, Ghanbarifardi	Oman sweetlips
Plectorhinchus mediterraneus (Guichenot, 1850)	Rubberlip grunt
Plectorhinchus multivittatus (W. J. Macleay, 1878)	Many-lined sweetlips
Plectorhinchus paulayi Steindachner, 1895	Zebra sweetlips
Plectorhinchus pictus (Tortonese, 1936)	Trout sweetlips
Plectorhinchus pica (G. Cuvier, 1828)	Painted sweetlips
Plectorhinchus plagiodesmus Fowler, 1935	Barred rubberlip
Plectorhinchus playfairi (Pellegrin, 1914)	Whitebarred rubberlip
Plectorhinchus polytaenia (Bleeker, 1853)	Ribboned sweetlips
Plectorhinchus schotaf (Forsskål, 1775)	Minstrel sweetlips
Plectorhinchus sordidus (Klunzinger, 1870)	Sordid rubberlip
Plectorhinchus umbrinus (Klunzinger, 1870)	
Plectorhinchus unicolor (W. J. Macleay, 1883)	Sombre sweetlips
Plectorhinchus vittatus (Linnaeus, 1758)	Oriental sweetlips
