= Genyatremus =

- Genyatremus dovii

Scientific classification
- Kingdom: Animalia
- Phylum: Chordata
- Class: Actinopterygii
- Division: Teleostei
- Order: Acanthuriformes
- Family: Haemulidae
- Subfamily: Plectorhinchinae
- Genus: Genyatremus; Gill, 1862

Type species
- Diagramma cavifrons Cuvier, 1830

Species
- see Text

Synonyms
- Paraconodon Bleeker, 1876

Genus of ray-finned fishes

Genyatremus is a genus of marine ray-finned fish, sweetlips belonging to the subfamily Plectorhynchinae, one of two subfamilies in the family Haemulidae, it consists of four species. The name of this genus is a compound of genys meaning “chin”, a meaning “without” and tremus meaning “pore”, a reference to the lack of a central pore on the chin in the fishes in this genus.

== Species ==
The species included in the genus Genyatremus are:

- ?Genyatremus cavifrons (Cuvier, 1830)
- Genyatremus dovii (Günther, 1864)
- Genyatremus luteus (Bloch, 1790)
- Genyatremus pacifici (Günther, 1864)

Some authorities have argued that Genyatremus luteus is not a valid name and that this taxon is synonymous with Cuvier’s Diagramma cavifrons. Others argue that Cuvier's D. cavifrons is not a haemulid but is a member of another family altogether and that Bloch's L. luteus is valid and should be used as the type species of the genus Genyatremus. They also place this genus of three species, D. cavifrons being subsumed into D. luteus, within the subfamily Haemulinae.
