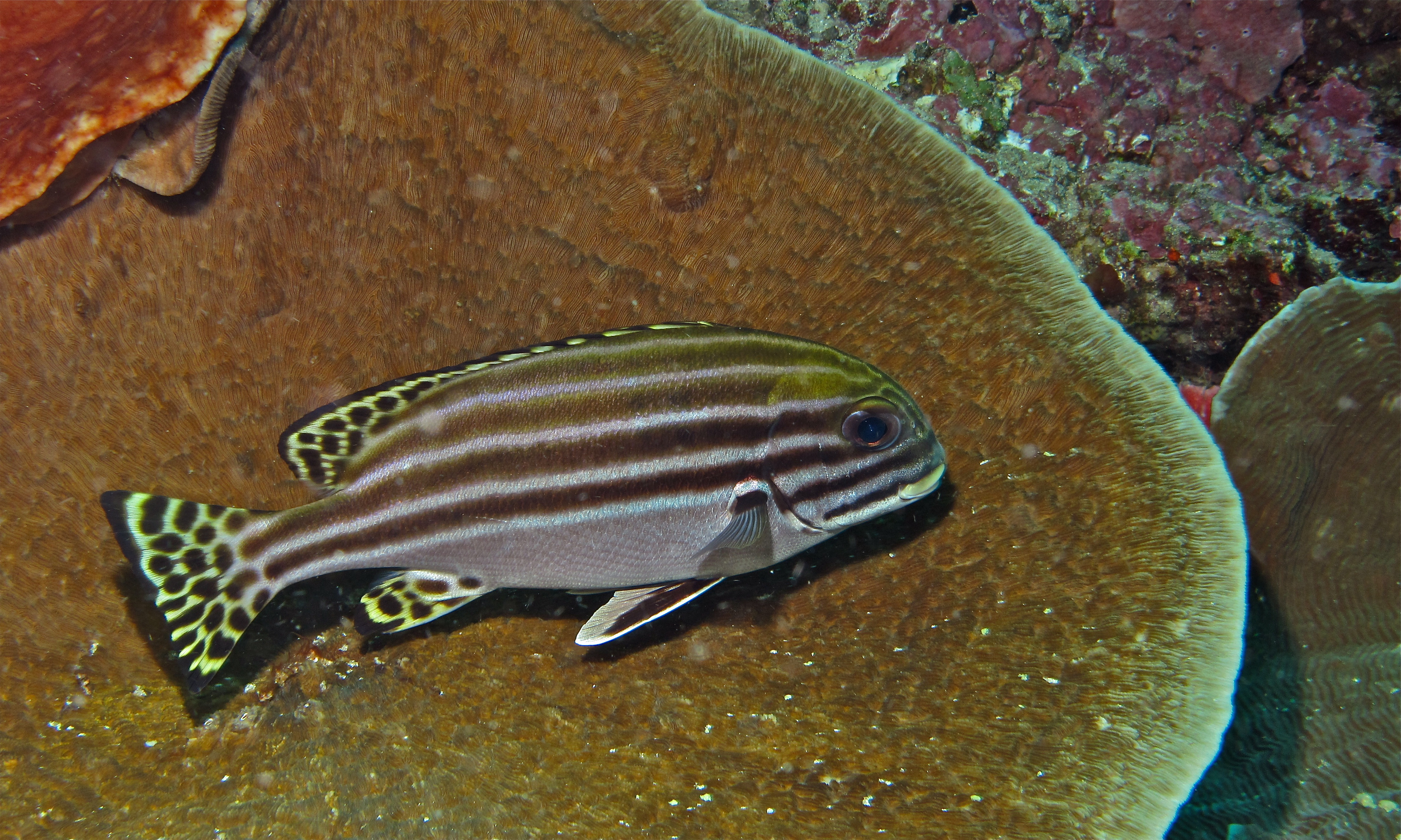
- Lesson's thicklip (Plectorhinchus lessonii)

Scientific classification
- Kingdom: Animalia
- Phylum: Chordata
- Class: Actinopterygii
- Division: Teleostei
- Order: Acanthuriformes
- Family: Haemulidae
- Subfamily: Plectorhinchinae; Jordan & Thompson, 1912

Genera
- see text

= Plectorhinchinae =

Subfamily of ray-finned fishes

Plectorhinchinae, is one of two subfamilies of the family Haemulidae, some known colloquially as sweetlips. This subfamily is regarded as having an Old World origin.

Sweetlips are recognizable by their prominent, fleshy lips, which have been described as "pouty". Their common name is derived from this characteristic. Sweetlips are a type of Actinopterygii, or Ray-Finned Fish, found in the Indo-West Pacific region, specifically in areas from East Africa to Polynesia.

As sweetlips age from juveniles into adults, most species undergo a striking change in coloration. Identifying species based on their scale patterns can be difficult because the patterns vary considerably between species.

== Genera ==
The following genera are included in the Plectorhinchinae:

- Diagramma Oken, 1817
- Genyatremus Gill, 1862
- Parapristipoma Bleeker, 1873
- Plectorhinchus Lacépède, 1801

Some authorities place the genus Genyatremus within the Haemulinae, although both Fishbase and Catalog of Fishes put this genus in the subfamily Plectorhinchinae.
