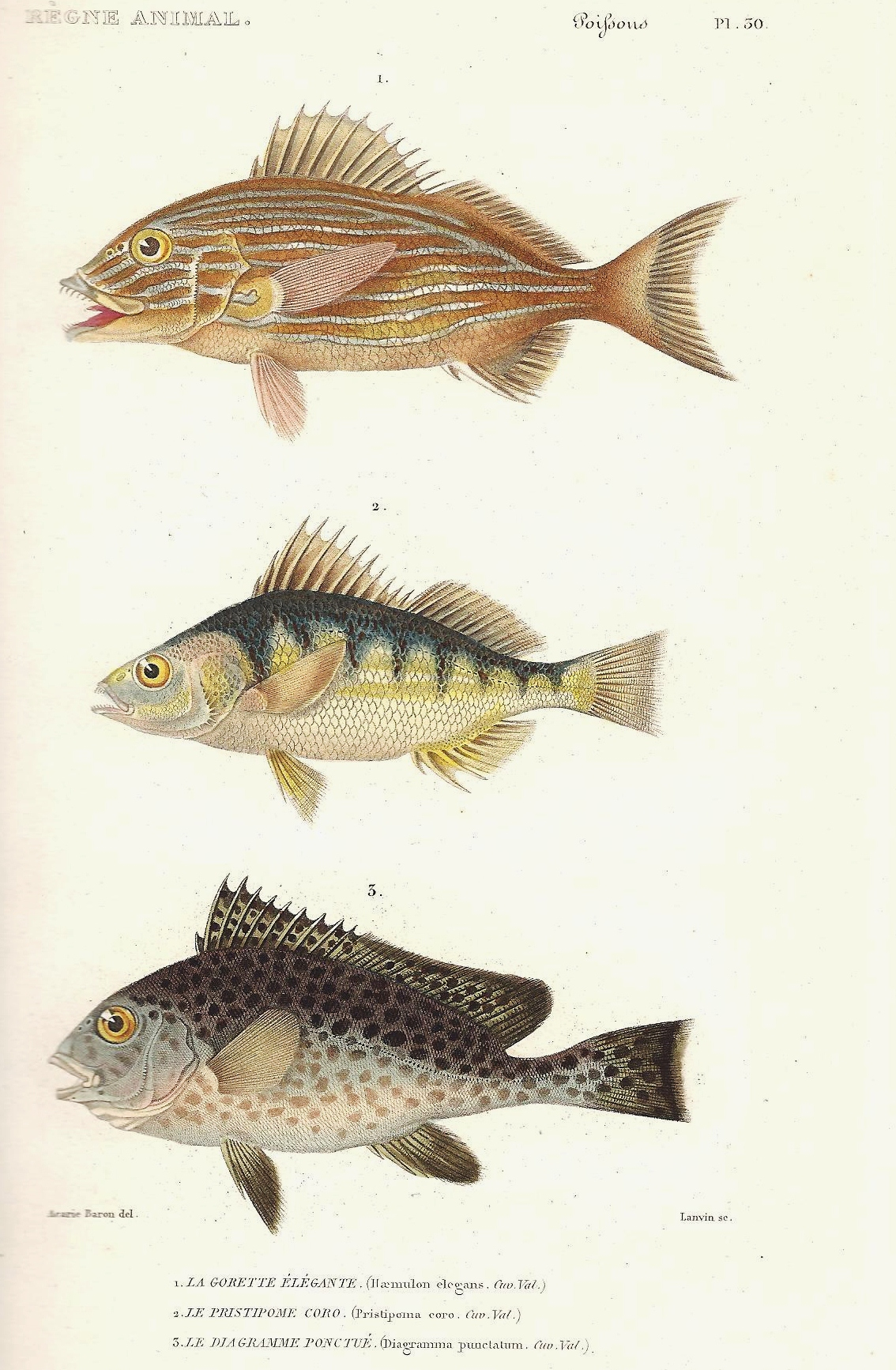
- Rhonciscus crocro (centre)

Scientific classification
- Kingdom: Animalia
- Phylum: Chordata
- Class: Actinopterygii
- Order: Acanthuriformes
- Family: Haemulidae
- Subfamily: Haemulinae
- Genus: Rhonciscus; Jordan & Evermann, 1896

Type species
- Pristipoma crocro Cuvier, 1830

= Rhonciscus =

Genus of ray-finned fishes

Rhonciscus is a genus of marine ray-finned fish, grunts belonging to the family Haemulidae. The species within the genus are found in the eastern Pacific and western Atlantic Ocean. It is not yet recognised by Fishbase but is by the Catalog of Fishes.

== Species ==
The following species are classified within the genus Rhonciscus:

- Rhonciscus approximans (Bean & Dresel, 1884)
- Rhonciscus bayanus (D. S. Jordan & Evermann, 1898) (longspine grunt)
- Rhonciscus branickii (Steindachner 1879) (sand-mover grunt)
- Rhonciscus crocro (Cuvier, 1830 (Panama grunt)
- Rhonciscus pauco Tavera, Schärer-Umpierre & Acero P., 2022
- Rhonciscus wagneri Espíndola, Caires & Rotundo, 2024

== Systematics ==
The type species of Rhonciscus is Pristipoma crocro. Molecular studies now suggest that Pomadasys sensu lato is paraphyletic with the Rhonciscus clade being Sister to the Haemulinae branch comprising the genera Haemulopsis, Conodon and Xenichthys. The genus Rhonciscus Jordan & Evermann, 1896 was revived to include the species listed above, The name Pristipoma is unavailable as its type species is Lutjanus hasta, a junior synonym of P. argenteus.
