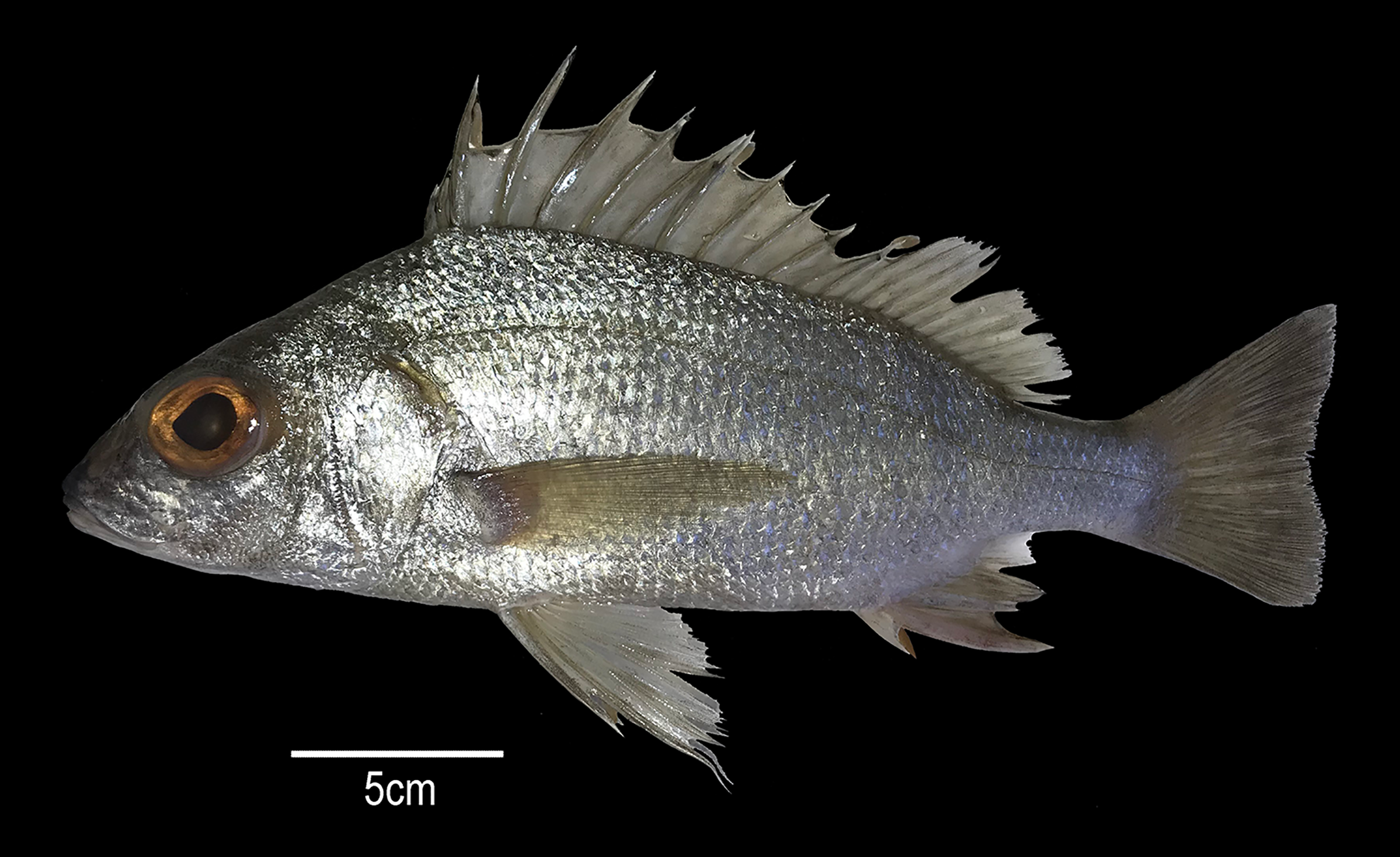

Scientific classification
- Kingdom: Animalia
- Phylum: Chordata
- Class: Actinopterygii
- Order: Acanthuriformes
- Family: Haemulidae
- Genus: Rhonciscus
- Species: R. pauco

Binomial name
- Rhonciscus pauco Tavera, Schärer-Umpierre & Acero P., 2022

= Rhonciscus pauco =

Species of fish

Rhonciscus pauco, the opalescent grunt, is a species of marine ray-finned fish belonging to the family Haemulidae, the grunts and sweetlips. This fish was first described in 2022 from type specimens caught by fishermen off the western coast of Puerto Rico.

== Taxonomy ==
Rhonciscus pauco was first formally described in 1922 by Jose Tavera, Michelle T. Schärer-Umpierre and Arturo Acero Pizarro with its type locality given as Tres Cerros, Rincón, Puerto Rico, at 18.34433°N, 67.28343°W, from a depth of 280 m (920 ft). This species is classified within the genus Rhonciscus within the subfamily Haemulinae, the grunts, of the family Haemulidae. The Haemulidae, which also includes the sweetlips of the subfamily Plectorhinchinae, the sweetlips, is classified in the order Acanthuriformes.

== Etymology ==
Rhonciscus pauco is classified in the genus Rhonciscus, this name is a diminutive of rhencus, the Greek word for "snore", a reference to the grunting nises that are produced by haemulids, hence the common name grunts, by grinding their pharyngeal teeth, using the swim bladder to amply these sound, particularly when removed from the water. The specific name, pauco, honors Pauco, a nickname for the fisherman Edwin Font, who caught the type specimens, sharing traditional knowledge of its ecology.

== Description ==
Rhonciscus pauco has 12 spines and 12 soft rays in its dorsal fin and 3 spines and 7 softrays in the anal fin. It has a somewhat elongate body which has a depth that is just over a third of its standard length. The dorsal profile in front of the dorsal fin is convex, the eyes are large and the snout is shorter than the diameter of the eye. The colour of the body is silvery-white, with some opalescence with some golden spots. This species has a maximum published standard length of 25 cm (9.8 in).

== Distributiona and habitat ==
Rhonciscus paucois only known from a small area of the Caribbean Sea off western Puerto Rico in deep water where there are fine sandy sediments between Rincón and Mayagüez at depths greater than 250 m (820 ft).
