= Lednevia =

Lednevia Temporal range: Early Miocene (Late Aquitanian)

Scientific classification
- Kingdom: Animalia
- Phylum: Chordata
- Class: Actinopterygii
- Division: Teleostei
- Order: Scombriformes
- Family: Pomatomidae
- Genus: †Lednevia; Daniltshenko, 1960
- Species: †L. oligocenica

Binomial name
- †Lednevia oligocenica (Smirnov, 1936)

Synonyms
- Percarina oligocenica Smirnov, 1936

Extinct genus of fishes

Lednevia is an extinct genus of prehistoric marine ray-finned fish, related to the modern bluefish, from the Early Miocene (Aquitanian) of the eastern Paratethys Sea. It contains one species, L. oligocenica, known from the Assinskaya Formation of the North Caucasus, Russia, with a potential indeterminate species known from slightly younger formations in the same region.

It was initially described in the genus Percarina in 1936, before being identified as a grunt related to Xenichthys in 1960 and placed in its own genus. However, a later study found it to not be a grunt, but a scombroid fish closely related to the modern bluefish.

== See also ==
- Prehistoric fish
- List of prehistoric bony fish
