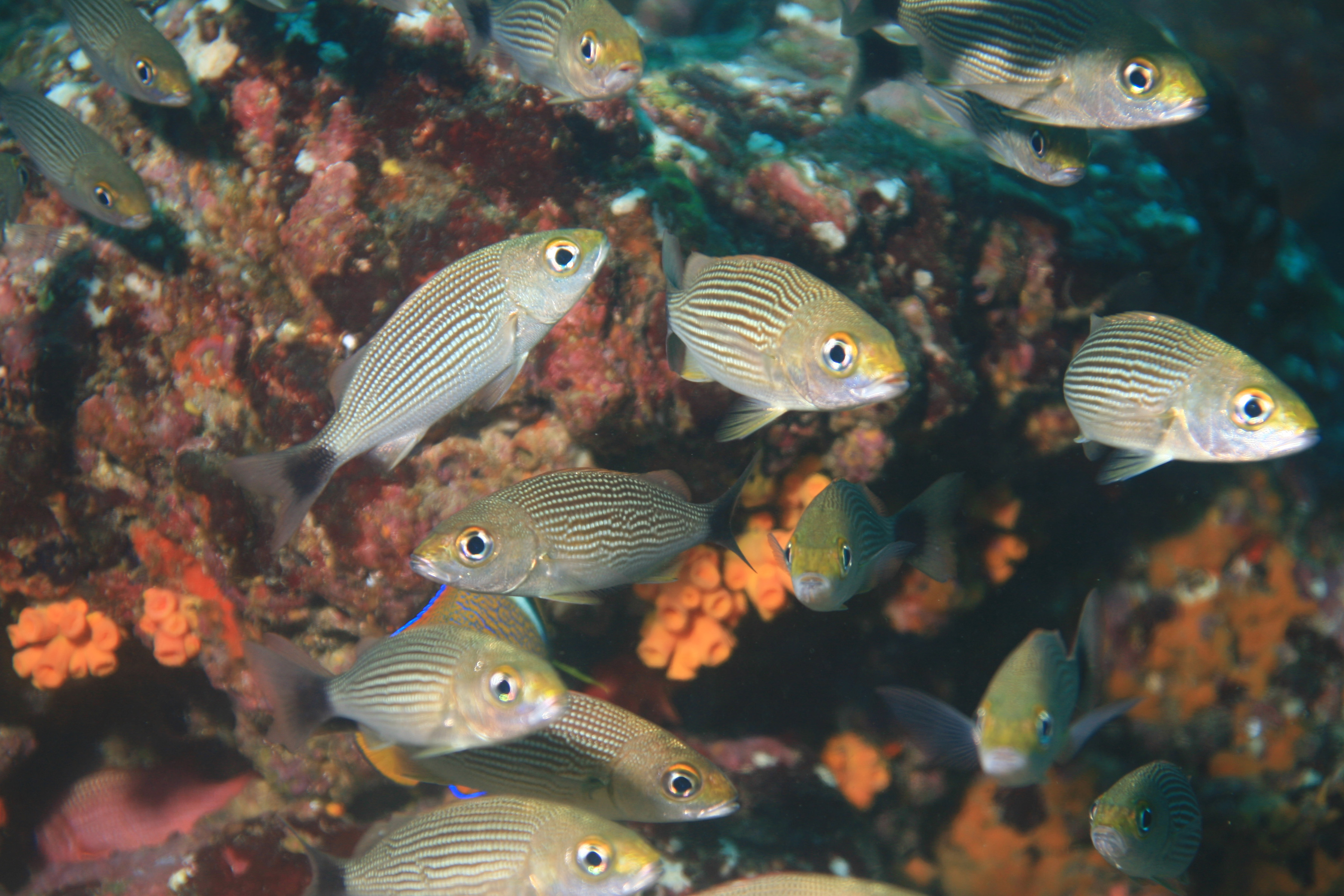
- Xenocys jessiae, Coiba National Park, Panama

Scientific classification
- Kingdom: Animalia
- Phylum: Chordata
- Class: Actinopterygii
- Order: Acanthuriformes
- Family: Haemulidae
- Subfamily: Haemulinae; Gill, 1885

Genera
- See text

= Haemulinae =

Haemulinae Temporal range: Middle Eocene–present

Subfamily of fishes

Haemulinae is a subfamily of the Haemulidae and consists of the genera of that family which are regarded as being of New World origin, although they are now widespread. The subfamily is distinguished from the Plectorhynchinae by having a short dorsal fin which contains 13-16 soft rays, as opposed to the long dorsal fin with 17-26 soft rays of the subfamily Plectorhynchinae.

== Genera ==
The following genera are included in the Haemulinae by Eschmeyer's Catalog of Fishes:

- Anisotremus Gill 1861
- Boridia Cuvier, 1830
- Brachydeuterus Gill, 1862
- Brachygenys Poey, 1868
- Conodon Cuvier, 1830
- Emmelichthyops Schultz, 1945
- Haemulon Cuvier, 1829
- Haemulopsis Steindachner, 1869
- Isacia Jordan & Fesler, 1893
- Microlepidotus Gill, 1862
- Orthopristis Girard, 1858
- Parakuhlia Pellegrin, 1913
- Paranisotremus Tavera, Acero & Wainwright, 2018
- Pomadasys Lacépède, 1802
- Rhencus Jordan & Evermann, 1896
- Rhonciscus Jordan & Evermann, 1896
- Xenichthys Gill, 1862

The genus Brachygenys is recognised by some authorities as Haemulon was determined to be paraphyletic in molecular studies which showed Haemulon chrysargyreum clustered with Xenistius californianus. The genus also includes the other species in the former genera Xenistius and Xenocys. Similarly, these studies also resolved Pomadasys as paraphyletic and the genera Rhencus and Rhonciscus were revived to solve this paraphyly, with the eastern Pacific species P. macracanthus and P. panamensis being placed in Rhencus while Rhonciscus contains the eastern Pacific species P. bayanus and the western Atlantic species P. crocro. These changes are recognised by Catalog of Fishes but not yet by Fishbase. In addition, according to these studies, Anisotremus moricandi makes Anisotremus paraphyletic if included and has been placed in the monotypic genus Paranisotremus.

Other authorities place the genus Genyatremus within the Haemulinae, although both Fishbase and Catalog of Fishes put this genus in the other Haemulid subfamily Plectorhinchinae.

Pomadasys fossils are known from the Middle Eocene of Egypt.
