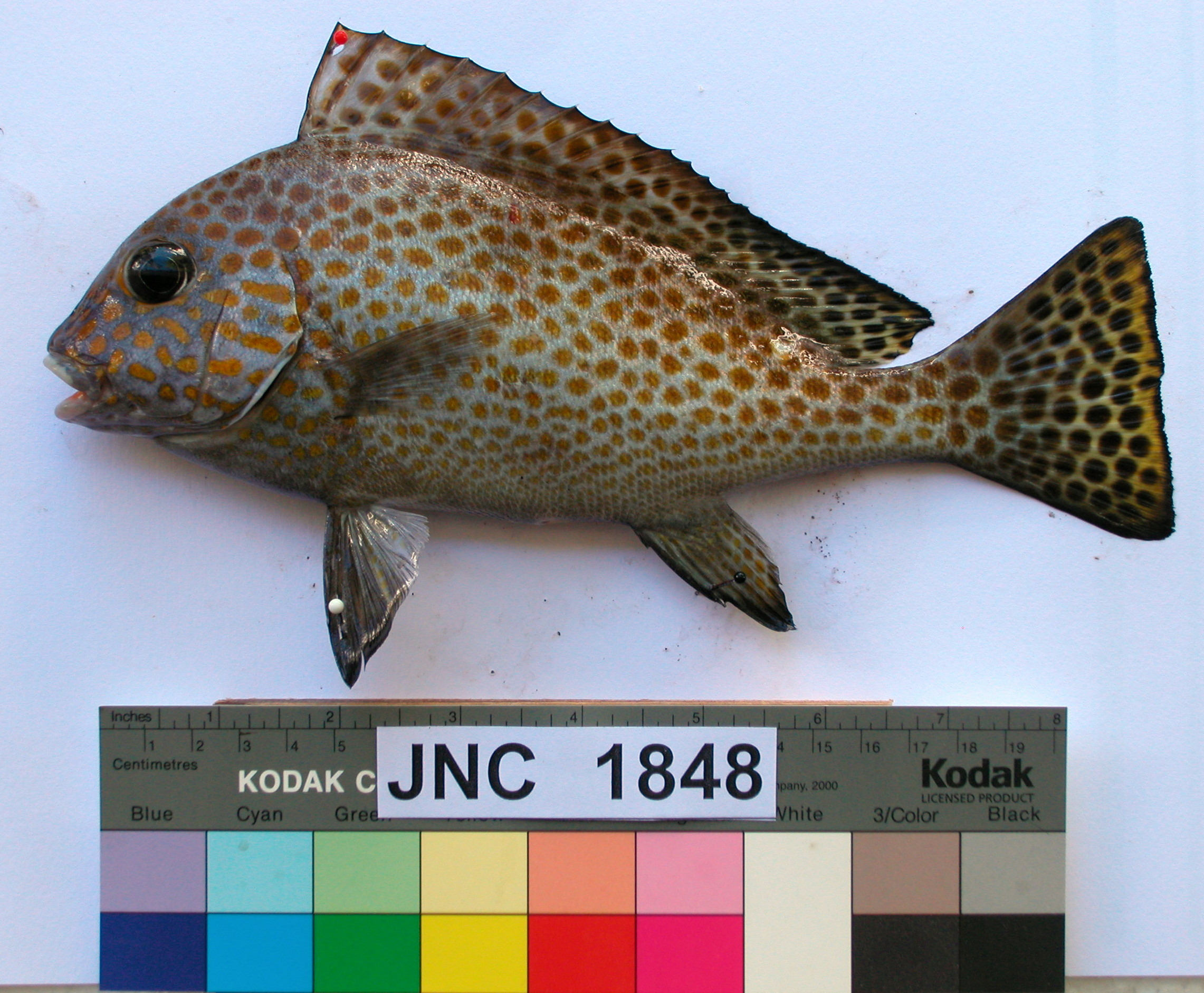

Conservation status
- Not evaluated (IUCN 3.1)(Global)
- Near Threatened (IUCN 3.1) (Persian Gulf)

Scientific classification
- Kingdom: Animalia
- Phylum: Chordata
- Class: Actinopterygii
- Order: Acanthuriformes
- Family: Haemulidae
- Genus: Diagramma
- Species: D. pictum

Binomial name
- Diagramma pictum (Thunberg, 1792)

Synonyms
- Perca picta Thunberg, 1792; Plectorhinchus pictus (Thunberg, 1792); Spilotichthys pictus (Thunberg, 1792)

= Painted sweetlips =

Species of fish

The painted sweetlips (Diagramma pictum), also known as the Australian slatey, blackall, bluey, grey sweetlips, moke, morwong, mother-in-law fish, painted blubber-lips, slate bream, slate sweetlips, smokey bream, thicklip or yellowdot sweetlips is a species of marine ray-finned fish, a sweetlips belonging to the family Haemulidae. It is widespread throughout the tropical waters of the Indo-West Pacific region.

== Description ==
The painted sweetlips has fleshy lips which increase in size as the fish matures. There are 6 pores on the chin but the median pit is absent. The dorsal fin contains 9–10 spines and 22–25 soft rays while the anal fin contains 3 spines and 7 soft rays. The adults are predominantly blue-grey in colour marked with bright yellow to golden orange spots these frequently form a pattern of lines on the head. The inside of the mouth is vivid orange to red. The dorsal fins have black margins, the anal and pelvic fins have black tips. The juveniles have clear alternating black and white stripes. Their underparts are silvery yellow and they have yellow dorsal and caudal fins yellow marked with black blotches and broken stripes. The stripes grow as the fish grows and begin to split into small circular spots then they fade on body although sometimes they are retained on the caudal fin. This species attains a maximum total length of 100 cm (39 in), although 55 cm (22 in) is a more common length, and the maximum published weight is 6.3 kg (14 lb).

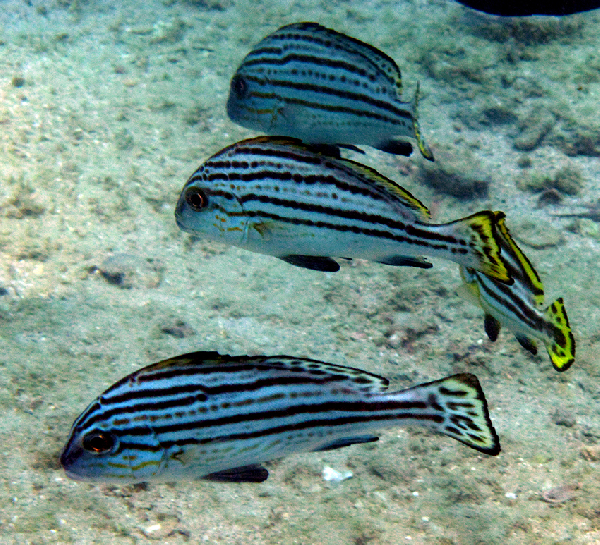
Juveniles

== Distribution ==
The painted sweetlips has a wide Indo-Pacific distribution. Its range extends from the eastern coast of Africa from the Red Sea to KwaZulu-Natal eastwards as far as Fiji and north to Japan. It is not found in Australia and is mostly absent from the southern coast of New Guinea.

== Habitat and biology ==
The painted sweetlips is found solitarily or in groups, frequently in turbid water. Its habitat can encompass open muddy, sandy or silty substrates in protected bays or estuaries, around rock outcrops, shipwrecks and rubble. It can also occur in shallow coastal waters and on coral reefs. The juveniles prefer weedy habitats. They feed on benthic invertebrates and smaller fishes. The males and females form distinct pairs when spawning. It is found as deep as 80 m (260 ft) and is most common over silty substrates.

=== Parasites ===
As other fish, the painted sweetlips is the host of many parasites. These include the lepocreadiid digenean Holorchis castex and the monorchiid digenean Lasiotocus plectorhynchi in the intestine and the cystidicolid nematode Metabronemoides mirabilis in the stomach.

== Systematics ==
The painted sweetlips was first formally described as Perca picta in 1792 by the Swedish naturalist Carl Peter Thunberg with the type locality given as Japan. When Lorenz Oken described the genus Diagramma he used Bloch's Anthias diagramma as its type species, this was shown to be a synonym of Thunberg's Perca picta, so Diagramma pictum is the type species of the genus Diagramma. The Australian species Diagramma labiosum has been considered a subspecies of this species, D. p. labiosum,, by some authorities. The specific name pictum means "painted" and is a reference to the bold black and white striped pattern of the juveniles.

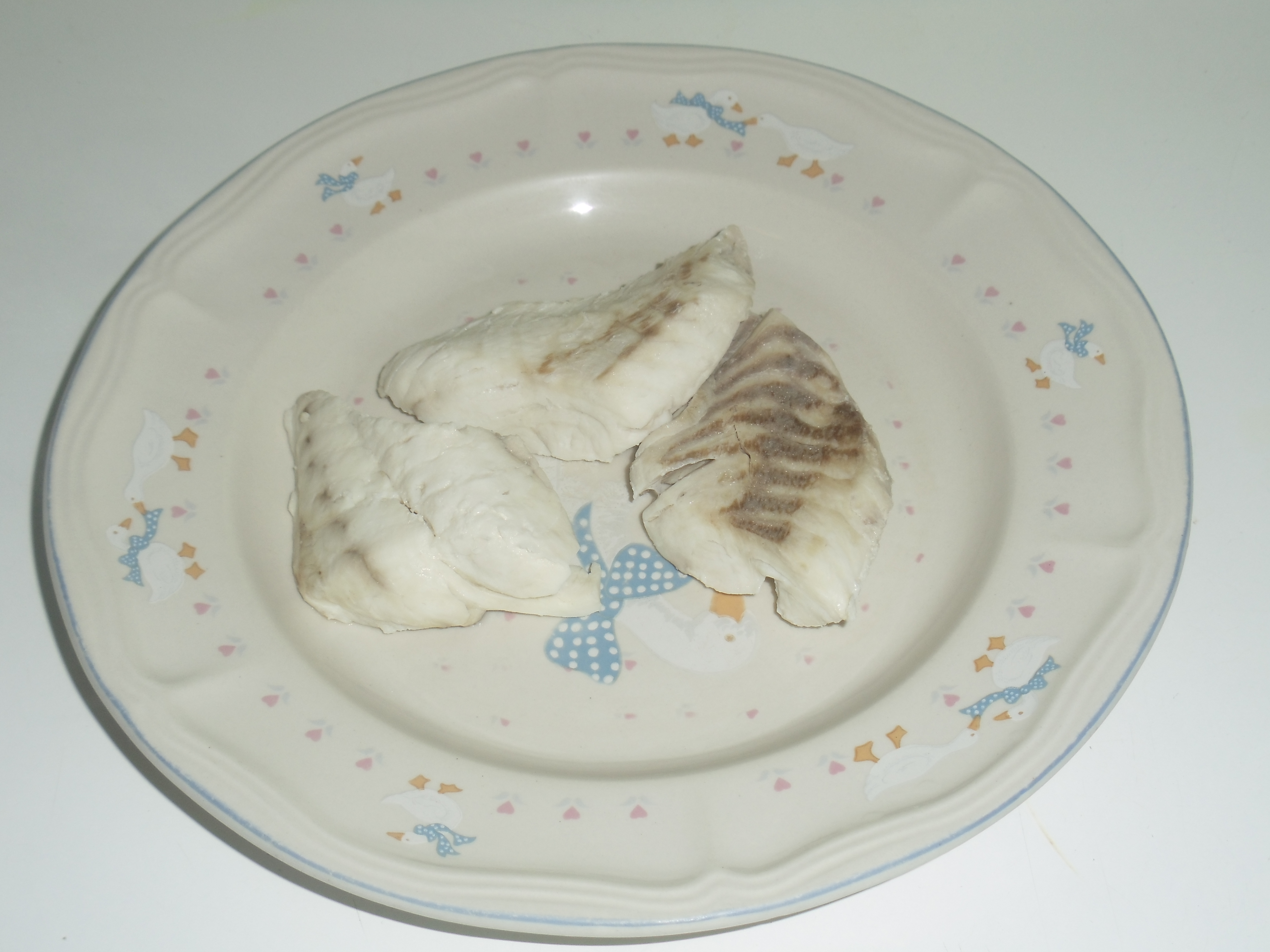
Three boiled fillets of painted sweetlips on a plate.

== Utilisation ==
The painted sweetlips is caught using handlines and by spear fishing. It is a common species that is typically marketed fresh, although a small quantity is preserved by salting. The toxin ciguatoxin has been detected in this species, this toxin is the cause of ciguatera poisoning in humans.
