= Blackfin slatey =

Scientific classification
- Kingdom: Animalia
- Phylum: Chordata
- Class: Actinopterygii
- Division: Teleostei
- Order: Acanthuriformes
- Family: Haemulidae
- Genus: Diagramma
- Species: D. melanacrum

Binomial name
- Diagramma melanacrum Johnson & Randall, 2001

Synonyms
- Plectorhinchus melanacrum (Johnson & Randall, 2001)

Species of fish

The blackfin slatey (Diagramma melanacrum), also known as blackfoot sweetlips, blackfin sweetlips or blacktip sweetlips, is a species of marine ray-finned fish, a sweetlips belonging to the family Haemulidae. It is found in the eastern Indian Ocean and the western central Pacific Ocean.

== Taxonomy ==
The blackfin slatey was first formally described in 2001 by Jeffrey W. Johnson and Johnson E. Randall with the type locality given as “South of Lombok, 8°24'S, 116°01'E” in Indonesia. Some authorities place this species in the genus Plectorhinchus, treating Diagramma as a synonym of that genus.

=== Etymology ===
The specific name is a compound of melanos meaning “black” and akros meaning “tip or end”, referring to the black margins to the anal, caudal and pectoral fins.

== Distribution ==
The blackfin slatey is found in the eastern Indian Ocean and the western Pacific Ocean. It has been recorded from Myanmar, Malaysia and Indonesia east to Philippines and New Ireland in Papua New Guinea.

In Australia they are found on the Ashmore Reef in the Timor Sea.

== Description ==
The dorsal fin contains 10-11 spines and 22-24 soft rays while the anal fin has 3 spines: and 6-7 soft rays. The third or fourth dorsal spine is the longest, the membranes between the dorsal fin spines are not notched. The pelvic fins extend as far or just past as the anus. The colour of the body is pale yellow on the back, shading to light silvery grey on the flanks and underparts, marked with many small dark brown spots. These are smaller below the lateral line where they form angled rows. The head pale purplish grey with a host of small dark brown spots the membrane on the gill cover is black. The dorsal fin and upper 75% of the caudal fin are yellow and are marked with small dark spots; the lower 25% of the caudal fin is black. The anal and pelvic fins are largely black. The caudal fin is sometimes slightly emarginate to truncate. Juveniles from a standard length of 13.3 cm (5.2 in) have large spots, roughly the same size as the pupil, over the head, body, dorsal and caudal fins these multiply and shrink as the fish grows. Larger juveniles and subadults up to a standard length of 25.4 cm (10.0 in) have thin broken wavy lines on the Gill cover and cheeks, reaching to near the front edge of the eye, on larger fish these lines are broken further into spots. This species attains a maximum total length of 45 cm (18 in).

From juvenile (left) to adult (right)

== Habitat and biology ==
The blackfin slatey is found on coastal reefs and in lagoons, encountered either solitarily or in small groups over sandy substrates. It is a nocturnal predator, resting during the day in small groups, the dispersing over the reef to prey on benthic invertebrate after dark. The juveniles may be found in estuaries and on silty reefs where there are open substrates with scattered outcrops or reef or rubble. The adults prefer deeper reefs along walls where there are sizeable caves at depths of more than 30 m (98 ft). Males and females form distinct pairs for spawning.
