= Pomadasys macracanthus =

Conservation status
- Least Concern (IUCN 3.1)

Scientific classification
- Kingdom: Animalia
- Phylum: Chordata
- Class: Actinopterygii
- Order: Acanthuriformes
- Family: Haemulidae
- Genus: Pomadasys
- Species: P. macracanthus

Binomial name
- Pomadasys macracanthus (Günther, 1864)

Synonyms
- Pristipoma macracanthum Günther, 1864; Rhencus macracanthus (Günther, 1864); Pristipoma andrei Sauvage, 1879; Pomadasys andrei (Sauvage, 1879)

Species of fish

Pomadasys macracanthus, the longspined grunt or Mexican gray perch, is a species of marine ray-finned fish, a grunt belonging to the family Haemulidae. It is native to the Eastern Pacific from Mexico to Ecuador.

== Description ==
Pomadasys macracanthus has a body which is oblong and laterally compressed, its depth being over one-third its standard length. The overall colour is silvery marked with 4 or 5 vague dark bars on their flanks, these may have faded completely in adults, and a dark spot on the upper angle of the operculum. The dorsal profile of the head is straight and the small mouth is positioned terminally. The dorsal fin is deeply notched and contains 12-14 spines and 13-14 soft rays while the anal fin contains 3 spines and 7-8 soft rays. The pectoral fins are rather long extending as far as the anus. They whole fish is covered with scales. This species attains a maximum total length of 37 cm (15 in), although 20 cm (7.9 in) is more typical.

== Distribution ==
Pomadasys macracanthus is found in the eastern Pacific Ocean. Its range extends from southern Baja California and the Gulf of California, south along the Pacific coast of Central and South America to Ecuador.

== Habitat and biology ==
Pomadasys macracanthus primarily lives in the littoral zone of the coastal marine environment, but has been known to enter estuaries. In the Golfo de Nicoya in Costa Rica the longspined grunt is regarded as an transient species which visits the area to use two mangrove areas. Their diet consists of mobile, benthic invertebrates such as cephalopods, gastropods, crustaceans and annelids.

== Systematics ==
Pomadasys macracanthus was first formally described in 1864 as Pristipoma macracanthum by the German-born British zoologist Albert Günther (1830-1914) with the type locality given as Chiapas in Mexico. The specific name macracanthus means "long" or "strong" spined. This species is placed in the genus Rhencus by some authorities, along with Pomadasys panamensis.

== Utilisation ==
Pomadasys macracanthus is important to commercial fisheries, especially in the Gulf of Montijo in Panama. Although the longspined grunt is not a true perch, it has been marketed for classroom science dissections in North America as the "Mexican gray perch," offering an apparent marine counterpart to the commonly dissected yellow perch.
