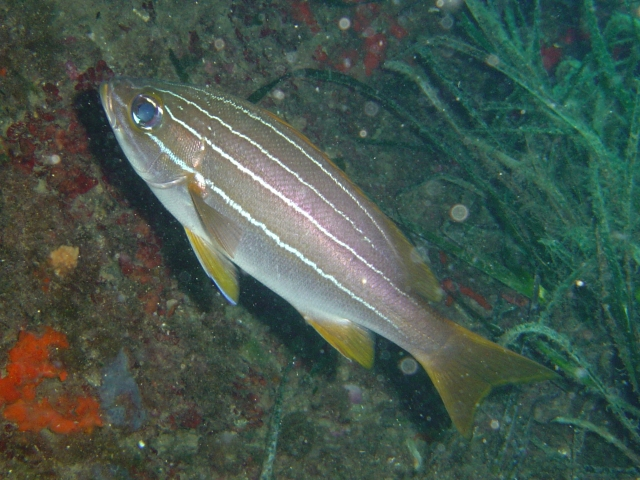

Conservation status
- Least Concern (IUCN 3.1)

Scientific classification
- Kingdom: Animalia
- Phylum: Chordata
- Class: Actinopterygii
- Division: Teleostei
- Order: Acanthuriformes
- Family: Haemulidae
- Genus: Parapristipoma
- Species: P. octolineatum

Binomial name
- Parapristipoma octolineatum (Valenciennes, 1833)

Synonyms
- Pristipoma octolineatum Valenciennes, 1833; Diagramma octolineatum (Valenciennes, 1833)

= African striped grunt =

Species of fish

The African striped grunt (Parapristipoma octolineatum) is a species of marine ray-finned fish, a sweetlips belonging to the subfamily Plectorhinchinae, one of two subfamilies in the family Haemulidae, the grunts. It is found in the eastern Atlantic Ocean.

== Description ==
The African striped grunt has an elongated body. It has a large eye and a large, oblique mouth with an obvious chin and a short snout. It has a continuous dorsal fin which contains 13 spines and 14-15 soft rays while the anal fin has 3 spines and 7 soft rays. It appears black underwater but in fact the upper body is brownish, while the lower body has a silvery appearance. It has four white, horizontal stripes along each flank, two of these running through the black eyes. The fins are yellow in colour, with the caudal fin being more vivid than the others. The maximum standard length of this species is 50 cm (20 in), although a more typical standard length is 25 cm (9.8 in).

== Distribution ==
The African striped grunt is found in the eastern Atlantic Ocean. It ranges along the western coast of Africa from Angola in the south north to Morocco, including the islands in the Gulf of Guinea and the Macaronesian Islands and the southern Iberian Peninsula, into the southern Mediterranean as far as east as Tunisia. Vagrancy has occurred in the Bay of Biscay off the western coast of France.

== Habitat and biology ==
The African striped grunt occurs at depths between 2 and 180 m (6 ft 7 in and 590 ft 7 in). It is found over sandy and rocky substrates where it feeds on crustaceans and molluscs. The males and females form distinct pairs for spawning. The juveniles move inshore to take up territories.

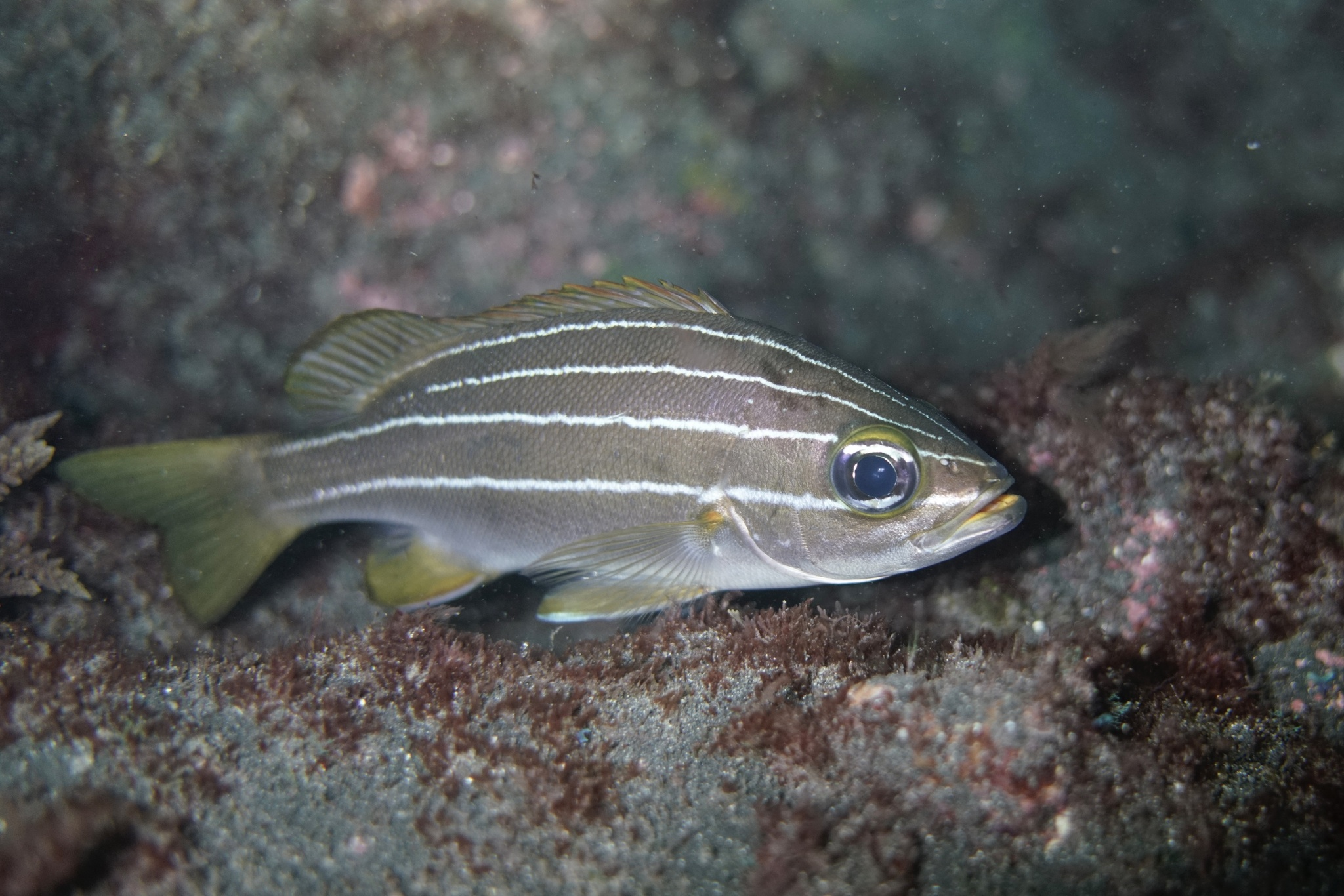
Parapristipoma octolineatum

== Systematics ==
The African striped grunt was first formally described in 1833 by the French zoologist Achille Valenciennes with the type locality given as Gorée in Senegal. The specific name octolineatum means "eight-lined", a reference to the four stripes on each flank.

== Utilisation ==
The African striped grunt is occasionally caught throughout its range, however, it is apparently not common and the catch is not reported separately. It is caught using trammel nets, bottom trawls and hook and line. The catch is largely sold fresh.
