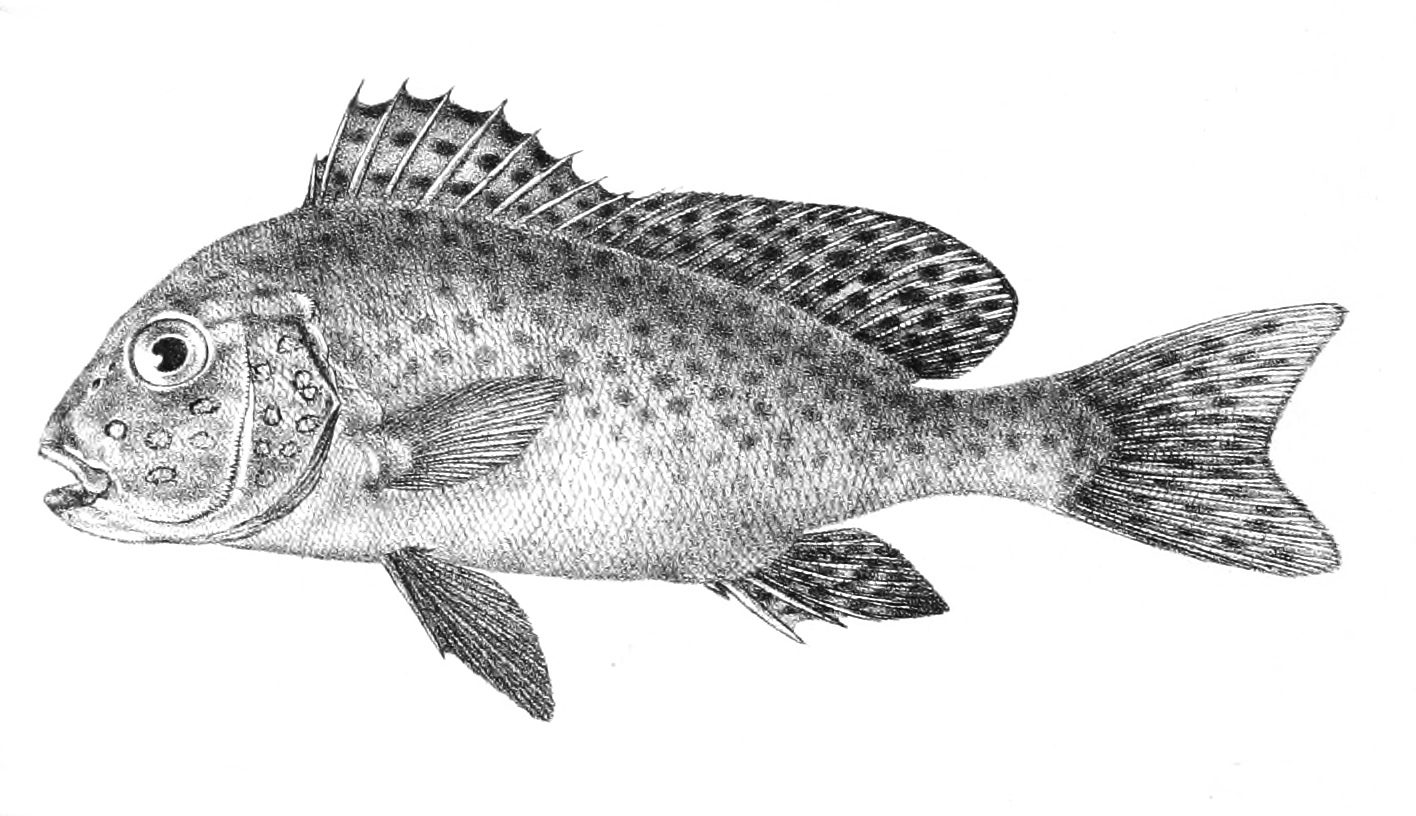

Scientific classification
- Kingdom: Animalia
- Phylum: Chordata
- Class: Actinopterygii
- Order: Acanthuriformes
- Family: Haemulidae
- Genus: Diagramma
- Species: D. punctatum

Binomial name
- Diagramma punctatum Cuvier, 1830

= Diagramma punctatum =

Species of ray-finned fish

Diagramma punctatum is a species of marine ray-finned fish, a sweetlips belonging to the family Haemulidae. This species attains a maximum total length of 35 cm (14 in). It is found in the western Indian Ocean, including the Red Sea and Socotra. This species was first formally described in 1830 by Georges Cuvier with the type locality given as the Red Sea. The specific name means “spotted” and refers to the spots on the heads of the adults and subadults.
