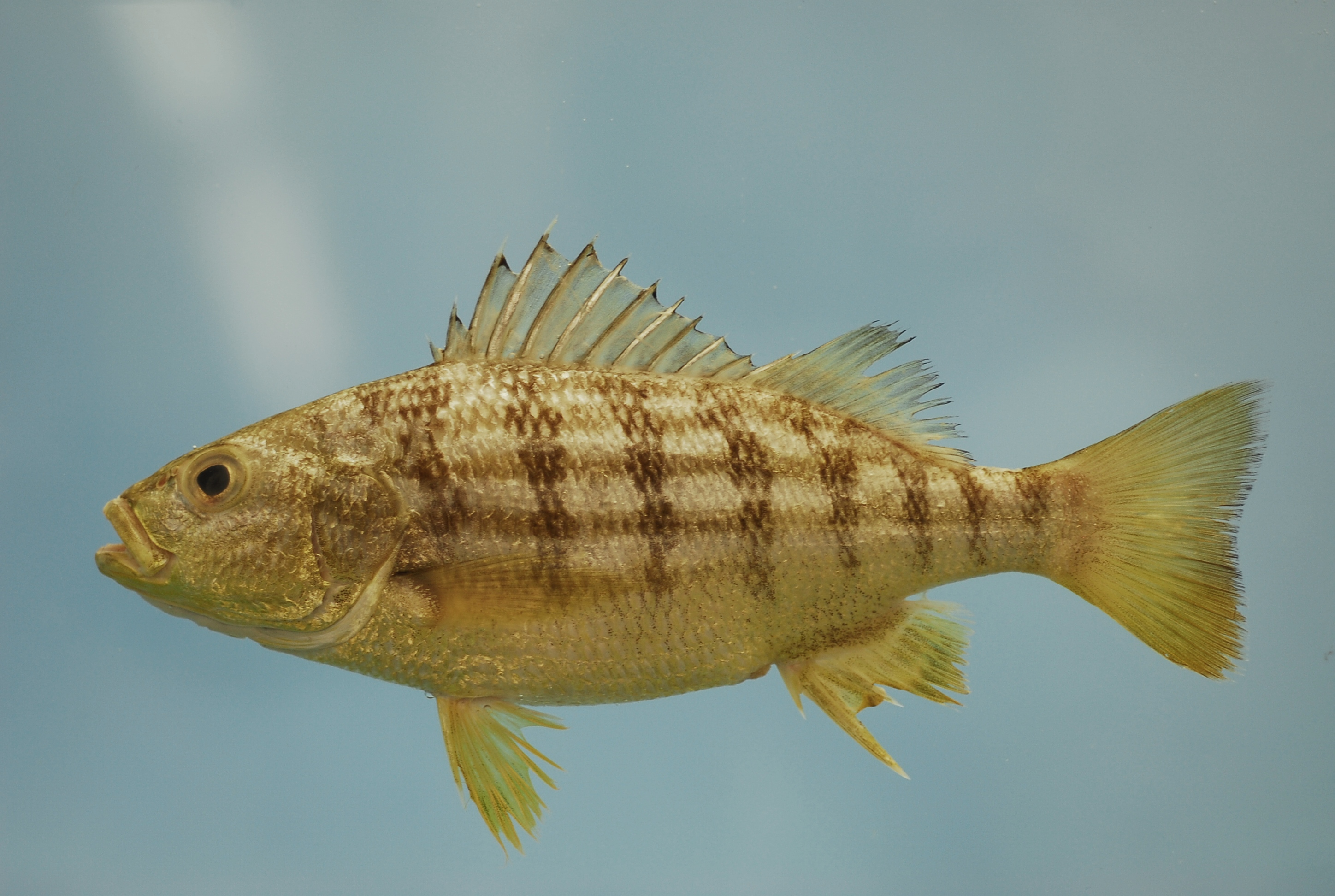

Conservation status
- Least Concern (IUCN 3.1)

Scientific classification
- Kingdom: Animalia
- Phylum: Chordata
- Class: Actinopterygii
- Division: Teleostei
- Order: Acanthuriformes
- Family: Haemulidae
- Genus: Conodon
- Species: C. nobilis

Binomial name
- Conodon nobilis Linnaeus, 1758

Synonyms
- Perca nobilis Linnaeus, 1758; Conodon antillanus G. Cuvier, 1830

= Conodon nobilis =

Species of fish

Conodon nobilis, the barred grunt, is a species of marine ray-finned fish, a grunt belonging to the family Haemulidae. It is found in the Western Atlantic Ocean where it is a target species for some commercial fisheries.

== Description ==
Conodon nobilis has a relatively robust, elongate, laterally compressed body with a large eye. The upper body is brownish, the abdomen is whitish and there are yellowish horizontal lines along the flanks. They normally show 8 wide dark vertical bars on the back. The soft-rayed part of the dorsal fin, the anal fin and the pelvic fin are yellow. The dorsal fin contains 12 spines and 13 soft rays while the anal fin contains 3 spines and 7 soft rays. This species attains a maximum total length of 33.6 cm (13.2 in), although 25 cm (9.8 in) is more typical.

== Distribution ==
Conodon nobilis is found in the western Atlantic Ocean. Its range extends from northeastern Florida to the upper Florida Keys and along the coasts of the Gulf of Mexico westwards from Louisiana to the northern Yucatan Peninsula of Mexico, south through the Caribbean Sea from Hispaniola to Tobago. It is also found along the coast of Central and South American from Mexico south to Argentina.

== Habitat and ecology ==
Conodon nobilis is found at depths down to 100 m (330 ft). It occurs largely in sandy coastal areas, although it is also found along rocky shores and in brackish and estuarine waters. It mainly uses the surf zone as a nursery instead of estuaries. It feeds at night, mostly on small fishes and crustaceans, mysids being the most important crustaceans in the diet, with amphipods also being important. There appears to be a peak of recruitment into the Spring.

== Systematics ==
Conodon nobilis was first formally described in 1758 as Perca nobilis by Carolus Linnaeus in the 10th edition of the Systema Naturae. The French anatomist Georges Cuvier (1769-1832) described a species he named Conodon antillanus in 1830, creating a new genus, Conodon, for it. Cuvier's C. antillanus was later shown to be a synonym of Linnaeus's Perca nobilis and, thus, this species is the type species of the genus Conodon. The specific name, nobilis, means "notable", "majestic" or "excellent" but Linnaeus did not explain why he chose this adjective.

== Utilisation ==
Conodon nobilis is a target for the commercial fisheries, the catch being sold fresh. It is also frequently caught as bycatch in other fisheries, for example it is commonly caught in the fishery for shrimp off Mexico and Brazil. It is also a quarry for sports fishing and appears in the aquarium trade. It is caught using seine nets, trawls and hook and line.
