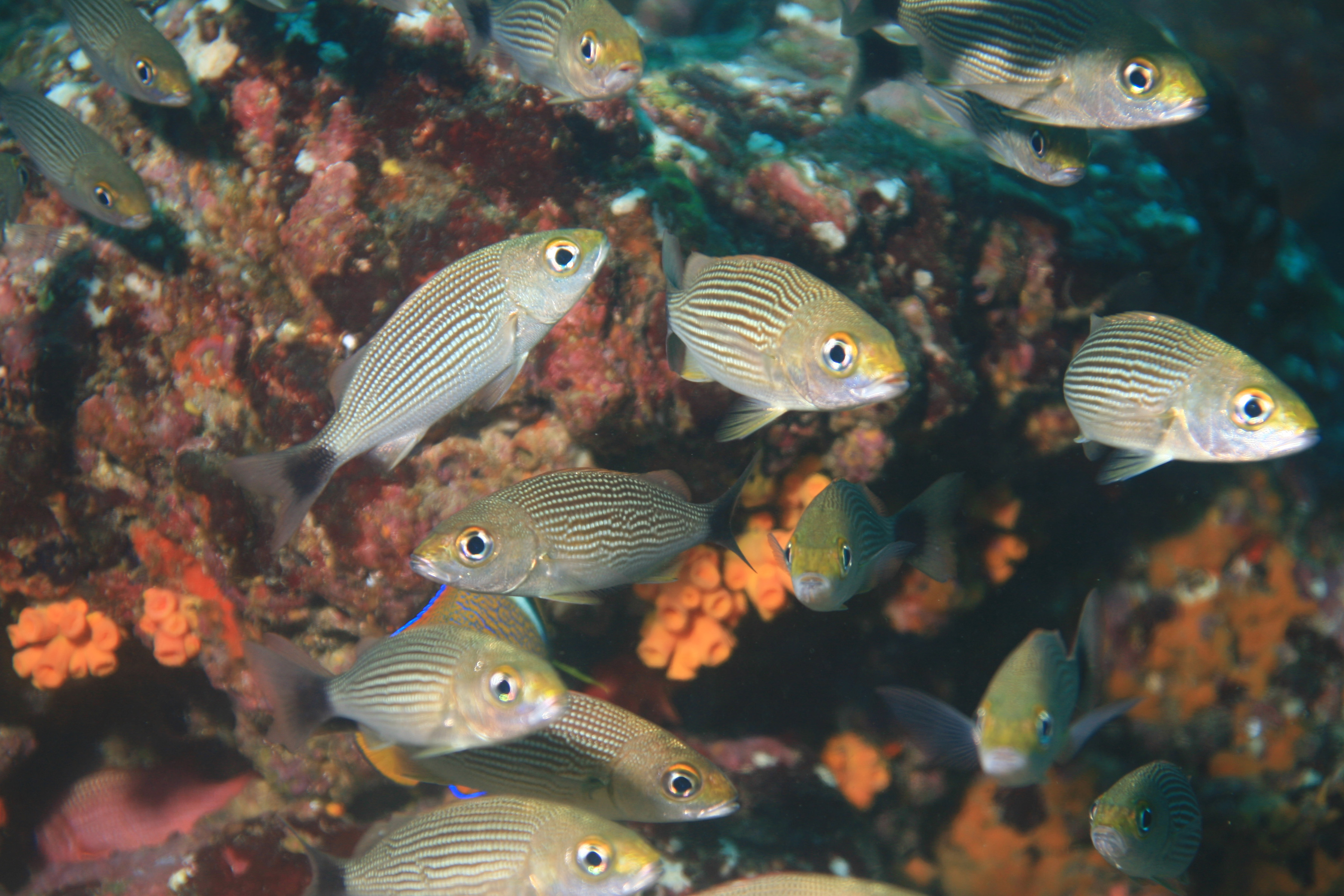

Conservation status
- Vulnerable (IUCN 3.1)

Scientific classification
- Kingdom: Animalia
- Phylum: Chordata
- Class: Actinopterygii
- Order: Acanthuriformes
- Family: Haemulidae
- Subfamily: Haemulinae
- Genus: Brachygenys
- Species: B. jessiae

Binomial name
- Brachygenys jessiae D. S. Jordan & Bollman, 1890

Synonyms
- Xenocys jessiae D.S. Jordan & Bollman, 1890

= Brachygenys jessiae =

Species of fish

Brachygenys jessiae, the black-striped salema, is a species of marine ray-finned fish, a grunt belonging to the family Haemulidae. It is endemic to the eastern Pacific Ocean.

== Description ==
Brachygenys jessiae has a relatively slender, elongated body, notably different from most related species. The head is conical in shape and has large eyes and a short diagonal mouth with a protruding lower jaw. It has very small teeth which are set in bands on the flaws and the palate. The dorsal fin is not continuous, the anterior spiny portion is completely divided from the posterior soft- rayed part. The dorsal fin contains 10 spines in the anterior portion and a single spine and 13-14 soft rays. The anal fin has 3 small spines and 10-11 soft rays. This species attains a maximum total length of 30 cm (12 in). The back is dark silvery-grey in colour, frequently showing yellowish green, yellowish blue or blue-green tints. The colour shades to paler silver on the flanks and to silvery-white on the underparts. There are 7 black, horizontal stripes along the flanks.

== Distribution ==
Brachygenys jessiae is found in the eastern Pacific Ocean where it is endemic to the waters around the Galápagos Islands.

== Habitat and biology ==
Brachygenys jessiae is found at depths between 0 and 20 m (0 and 66 ft). It forms dense schools in these shallow waters. These spend the day along rock walls and over rocky slopes. They feed on plankton and small fishes. It is an oviparous species, spawning in distinct pairs.

== Systematics ==
Brachygenys jessiae was first formally described in 1890 by the American ichthyologists David Starr Jordan (1851–1931) and Charles Harvey Bollman (1868–1889) with the type locality given as Isla Santa Maria in the Galápagos Islands of Ecuador. This species is placed in the monotypic genus Xenocys by some authorities. This was done when Haemulon was determined to be paraphyletic in molecular studies which showed Haemulon chrysargyreum, the type species of Felipe Poey's Brachygenys, clustered with Xenistius californianus. The genus was therefore revived to include also includes the other species in Xenistius and this species. This change has been accepted by Catalog of Fishes but not by Fishbase. The specific name honours Jordan's second wife Jessie Knight Jordan (1866–1952).
