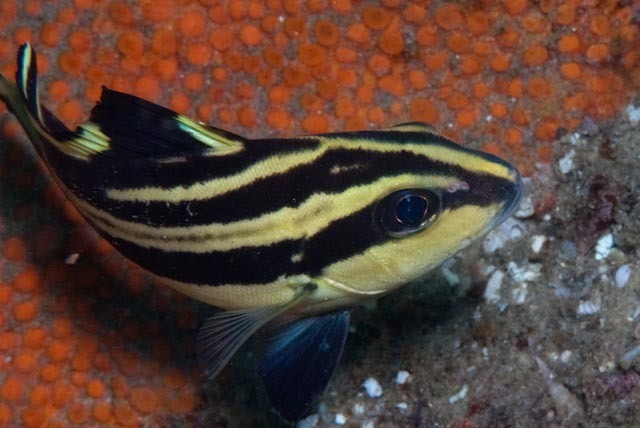
- juvenile, Mozambique

Conservation status
- Least Concern (IUCN 3.1)

Scientific classification
- Kingdom: Animalia
- Phylum: Chordata
- Class: Actinopterygii
- Order: Acanthuriformes
- Family: Haemulidae
- Genus: Diagramma
- Species: D. centurio

Binomial name
- Diagramma centurio Cuvier, 1830

Synonyms
- Plectorhinchus centurio (Cuvier, 1830)

= Sailfin rubberlip =

Species of fish

The sailfin rubberlip (Diagramma centurio) is a species of marine ray-finned fish, a sweetlips belonging to the family Haemulidae. It is found in the western Indian Ocean.

== Description ==
The sailfin rubberlip has adults and subadults which are overall silvery grey, although they may be marked with many dark brown or black dots on head and back when they are over 30 to 100 cm (12 to 39 in) in length. Smaller subadults have slightly larger orange-brown spots scattered on the upper part of the head, body and caudal peduncle. The juveniles at a length of approximately 12 cm (4.7 in) may be grey or yellow, with a wide black band running from the snout through the eye to the rear margin of the caudal fin, another runs from top of head to posterior margin of the dorsal fin. There is an arcing black band from the front of the dorsal fin covering the lower 2/3rd Of the fin. There are black margins on the pelvic and anal fins, the corners of caudal fin. There are additional stripes which as the fish grows and once they have attained a length of around 20 cm (7.9 in) the stripes start to fragment into spots. The dorsal fin contains 9-10 spines with the front spines lengthened in smaller juveniles while in adults the 2nd and 3rd spines are the longest, and 21-25 soft rays. The anal fin contains 7 soft rays. This species attains a maximum total length of 100 cm (39 in).

== Distribution ==
The sailfin rubberlip is endemic to the western Indian Ocean. It occurs along the African coast from Kenya to South Africa, in Madagascar, the Comoros Islands and the Seychelles.

== Habitat and biology ==
The sailfin rubberlip is found at depths between 3 and 50 m (9.8 and 164.0 ft) on coral reefs. The adults tend to be solitary or to live in small aggregations but the juveniles live within beds of sea grass. This is a predatory species which has a diet dominated by crustaceans and small fish.

== Systematics ==
The sailfin rubberlip was first formally described in 1830 by the French zoologist George's Cuvier with the type locality given as the Seychelles. Some authorities place this species in the genus Plectorhinchus, while others regard the genus Diagramma as a synonym of Plectorhinchus. The specific name "centurio" is derived from "centurion", the Roman legionary officer, a reference to the local French colonial name of capitaine in the Seychelles.

== Utilisation ==
The sailfin rubberlip is caught using caught using hand lines and it is thought of as a quality food fish. It is also caught using spears. This large species is not suitable for most home aquaria but it is displayed in some public aquariums.
