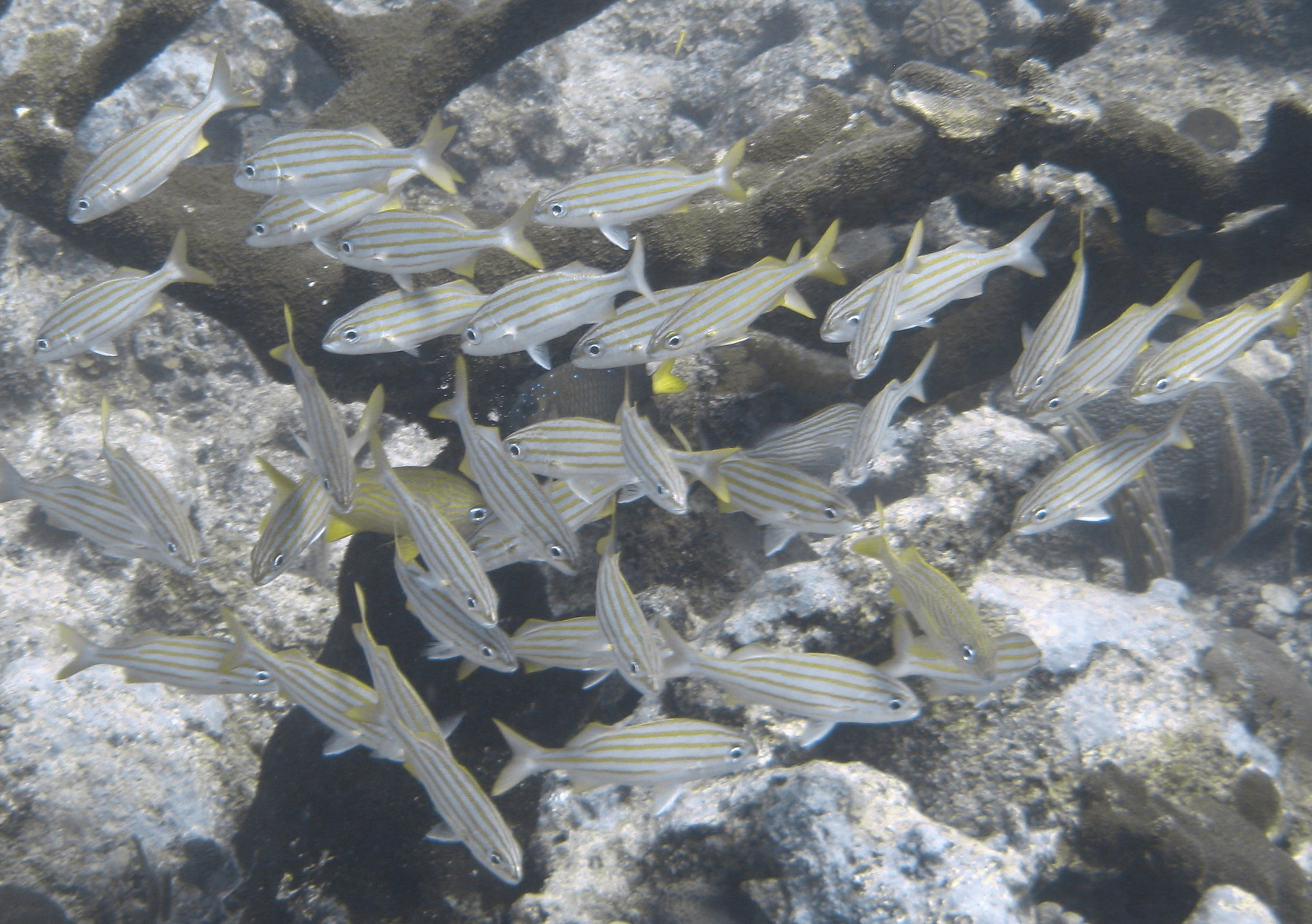
- Brachygenys chrysargyrea

Scientific classification
- Kingdom: Animalia
- Phylum: Chordata
- Class: Actinopterygii
- Order: Acanthuriformes
- Family: Haemulidae
- Subfamily: Haemulinae
- Genus: Brachygenys; Poey, 1868

Type species
- Haemulon taeniatum Poey, 1860

Synonyms
- Xenistius Jordan & Gilbert, 1883; Xenocys Jordan & Bollman, 1890

= Brachygenys =

Genus of ray-finned fishes

Brachygenys is a genus of marine ray-finned fish, grunts belonging to the family Haemulidae. The species within the genus are found in the eastern Pacific Ocean and western Atlantic Ocean.

== Species ==
The following species are classified within the genus Brachygenys:

- Brachygenys californiensis (Steindachner, 1875) (California salema)
- Brachygenys chrysargyrea (Gũnther, 1860) (Smallmouth grunt)
- Brachygenys jessiae Jordan & Bollman, 1890 (Black-striped salema)
- Brachygenys peruana (Hildebrand, 1856)

== Systematics ==
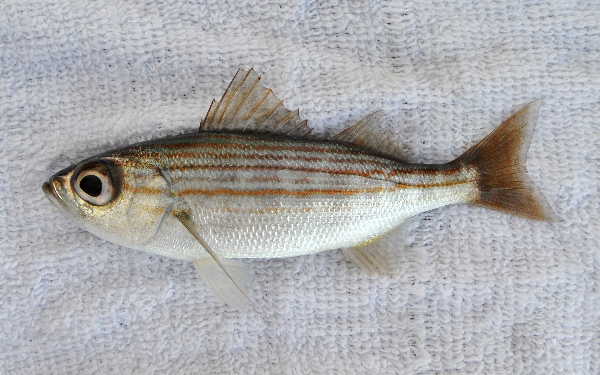
Brachygenys californiensis (formerly in Xenistius)

The type species of Brachygenys is Haemulon chrysargyreum which as H. taeniatum was described by the Cuban zoologist Felipe Poey (1799-1891) but that taxon is a junior synonym of H. chrysargyreum. Fishbase still places H. chrysargyreum in the genus Haemulon, molecular studies now suggest that Haemulon sensu lato is paraphyletic because H. chrysargyreum clustered with Xenistius californiensis, rendering Haemulon as paraphyletic if Xenistius was not included. The genus Brachygenys Poey, 1868 was revived to include the species listed above.
