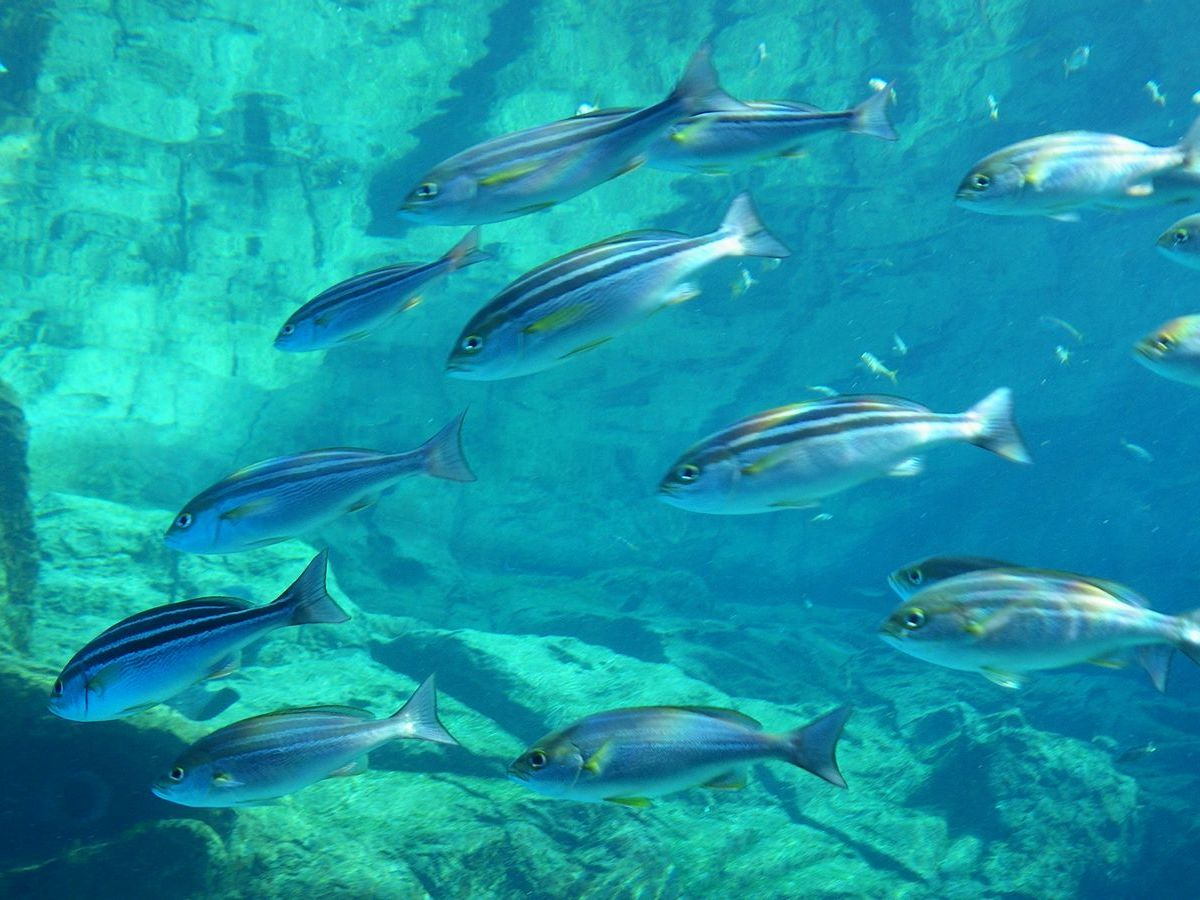
- Chicken grunt Parapristipoma trilineatum

Scientific classification
- Kingdom: Animalia
- Phylum: Chordata
- Class: Actinopterygii
- Order: Acanthuriformes
- Family: Haemulidae
- Subfamily: Plectorhinchinae
- Genus: Parapristipoma; Bleeker, 1873

Type species
- Perca trilineata Thunberg, 1793

Synonyms
- Diagrammella Pellegrin, 1912

= Parapristipoma =

Genus of ray-finned fishes

Parapristipoma is a genus of marine ray-finned fish, sweetlips belonging to the subfamily Plectorhinchinae of the family Haemulidae. The species within the genus are native to the eastern Atlantic Ocean and the western Pacific Ocean.

== Species ==
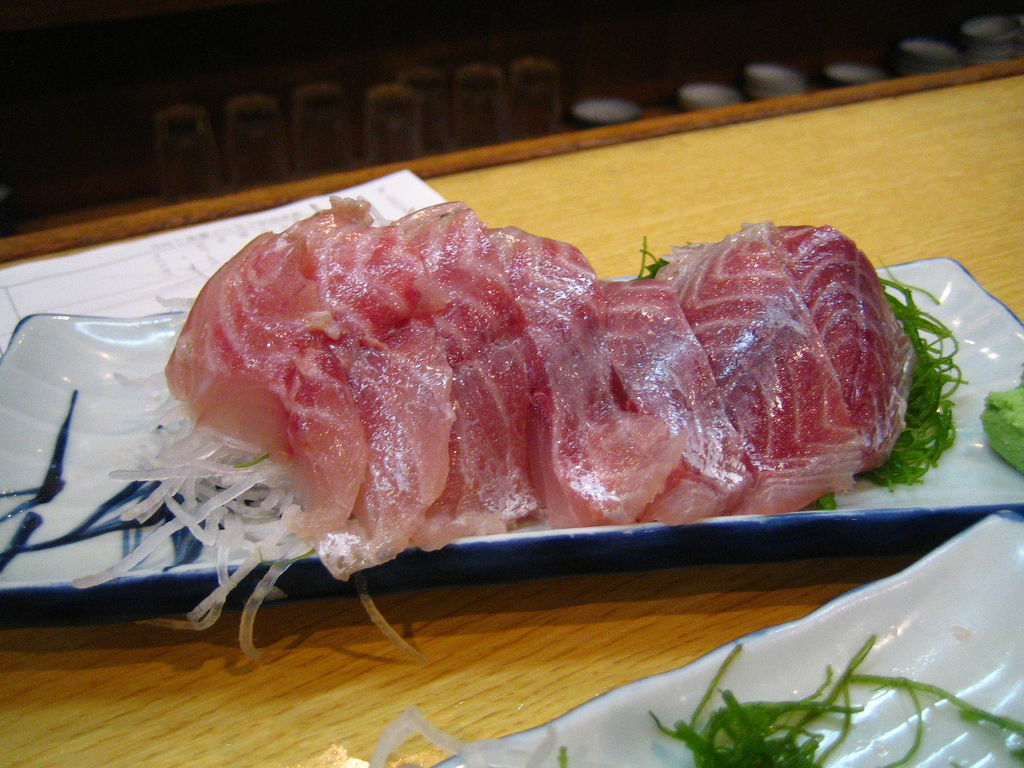
Chicken grunt (Parapristipoma trilineatum) sashimi

The currently recognized species in this genus are:

- Parapristipoma humile (S. Bowdich, 1825) (Guinean grunt)
- Parapristipoma macrops (Pellegrin, 1912)
- Parapristipoma octolineatum (Valenciennes, 1833) (African striped grunt)
- Parapristipoma trilineatum (Thunberg, 1793) (chicken grunt)
