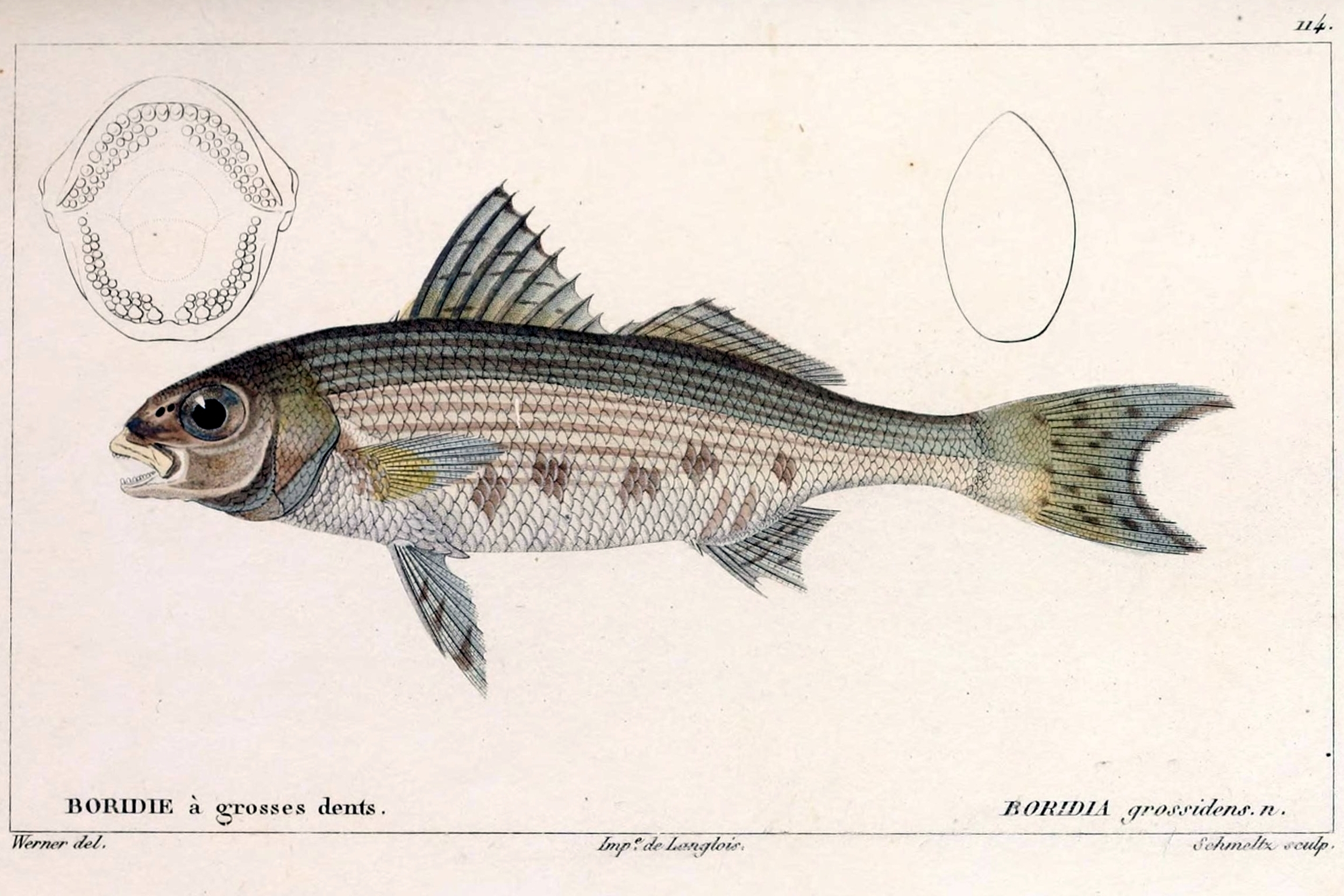

Conservation status
- Least Concern (IUCN 3.1)

Scientific classification
- Kingdom: Animalia
- Phylum: Chordata
- Class: Actinopterygii
- Division: Teleostei
- Order: Acanthuriformes
- Family: Haemulidae
- Subfamily: Haemulinae
- Genus: Boridia; G. Cuvier, 1830
- Species: B. grossidens

Binomial name
- Boridia grossidens G. Cuvier, 1830

Synonyms
- Pristipoma catharinae Cuvier, 1830; Mylacrodon goeldii Regan, 1903

= Borriqueta porgy =

Species of fish

The Borriqueta porgy (Boridia grossidens) is a species of marine ray-finned fish, a grunt belonging to the family Haemulidae. It is native to the Atlantic Coast of South America.

== Description ==
The borriqueta porgy has a rectangular body with a shallow, blunt head in which the eyes are placed towards the front and there is a small mouth. The soft-rayed parts of the dorsal and anal fins are scaleless and there is a clear notch between spines and soft-rayed portions of the dorsal fin. The dorsal fin contains 12 spines and 13 soft rays while the anal fin has 3 spines and 10-11 soft rays. The initial pair of dorsal spines are low and the second spine in the anal fin is robust. It has short pectoral fins. The colour of the body is light grey, darkening on the back. The margins of the scales are dark, creating a latticed pattern. The spines portion of the dorsal fin is grey with darker membranes between the spines. The soft-rayed parts of the dorsal and anal fins are grey with a darker blotch. The rear parts of the caudal and pelvic fins are dark. This species attains a maximum total length of 32 cm (13 in).

== Distribution ==
The borriqueta porgy is found in the southwestern Atlantic Ocean. It is found off southern Brazil, Uruguay and northern Argentina. There is some evidence of a southward shift in its range due to warming water temperatures which may be a result of climate change.

== Habitat and biology ==
The borriqueta porgy is found in the waters of the continental shelf and in estuaries over soft substrates. They form distinct pairs for mating. The trematode Diplomonorchis leiostomi has been recorded as an endoparasite of this species.

== Systematics ==
The borriqueta porgy was first formally described in 1830 by the French anatomist Georges Cuvier (1769–1832) with the type locality given as Brazil. The genus Boridia is monospecific. The genus name is derived from a word used by Xenocrates (ca. 396/5-314/3 BC) for an unidentified fish while the specific name is a compound of grossus meaning “large” and dens meaning “teeth”, a reference to the large front teeth on both jaws.
