= Dara (fish) =

Conservation status
- Data Deficient (IUCN 3.1)

Scientific classification
- Kingdom: Animalia
- Phylum: Chordata
- Class: Actinopterygii
- Order: Acanthuriformes
- Family: Haemulidae
- Subfamily: Haemulinae
- Genus: Parakuhlia; Pellegrin, 1913
- Species: P. macrophthalmus

Binomial name
- Parakuhlia macrophthalmus (Osório, 1893)

Synonyms
- Haemulon macrophthalmum Osório, 1893; Parakuhlia boulengeri Pellegrin, 1913

Species of fish

The dara (Parakuhlia macrophthalmus) is a species of marine ray-finned fish, a grunt belonging to the family Haemulidae. It is native to the Atlantic coast of Africa. It is the only species in the monospecific genus Parakuhlia.

== Description ==
The dara has an oval, moderately deep and laterally compressed body with a steep head, the profile of the head being, a little concave above the large eyes and ending in a short, blunt snout. The mouth is large, set diagonally and has protrusible jaws. The jaws are equipped with many bands made up of villiform teeth which are also on the vomer but there are no teeth on the palate There is a single dorsal fin but it has a deep notch between the spiny portion and the soft-rayed portion. The dorsal fin contains 11 spines in before the notch and 1 spine and 15 or 16 soft rays behind the notch, the anal fin has 3 spines and 16 soft rays. The caudal fin is slightly emarginated. It is mostly silvery in colour, darker on the back, while the fins are dark yellow. This species attains a maximum total length of 20 cm (7.9 in), although 15 cm (5.9 in) is more typical.

== Distribution ==
The dara is found in the eastern Atlantic Ocean along the western coast of Africa from Senegal in the north to Angola in the south, it is commonest in the Gulf of Guinea.

== Habitat and biology ==
The dara is found at depths between 2 and 20 m (6 ft 7 in and 65 ft 7 in) where it is found in inshore waters at rocky coasts and beaches. It is an oviparous species which forms distinct pairs for spawning. Almost nothing is known about the biology of this species.

== Systematics ==
The dara was first formally described in 1893 as Haemulon macropthalmus by the Portuguese naturalist Balthasar Osório with the type locality given as Rolas Island off São Tomé Island. In 1913 the French zoologist Jacques Pellegrin (1873-1944) described a new species and placed it in the new genus Parakuhlia, giving it the specific name boulengeri. Pellegrin's taxon was later shown to be a junior synonym of Osório's Haemulon macropthalmus. Parakuhlia is monotypic, the dara being the only species in this genus. This species was originally placed in the Flagtail family, Kuhliidae and the generic name Parakuhlia is a reference to Pellegrin's note that this species is similar in appearance to Kuhlia caudovittata although it differed in a number of characteristics. The specific name marcropthalma means large-eyed.

== Utilisation ==
The dara is not considered to be important to commercial fisheries but it is caught by artisanal fisheries using seines, set nets and hook and line. The fish are sold fresh and normally eaten fried or smoked.
