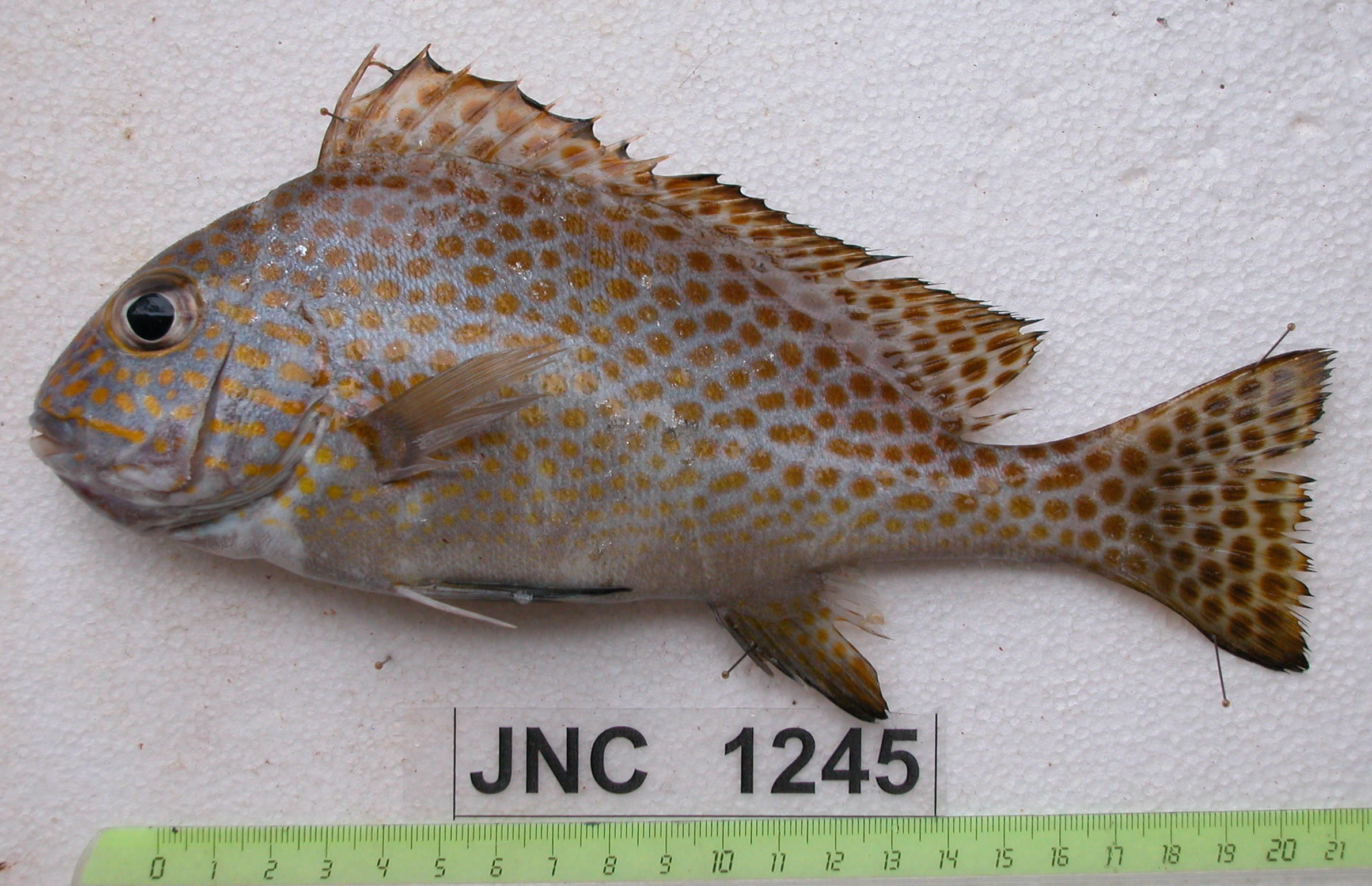
- Diagramma pictum

Scientific classification
- Kingdom: Animalia
- Phylum: Chordata
- Class: Actinopterygii
- Order: Acanthuriformes
- Family: Haemulidae
- Subfamily: Plectorhinchinae
- Genus: Diagramma; Oken, 1817

Type species
- Anthias diagramma Bloch, 1792

Synonyms
- Spilotichthys Fowler, 1904

= Diagramma =

Genus of ray-finned fishes

Diagramma is a genus of marine ray-finned fishes belonging to the family Haemulidae, grunts native to the Indian Ocean and the western Pacific Ocean.

== Species ==
The currently recognized species in this genus are:

- Diagramma centurio G. Cuvier, 1830 (sailfin rubberlip)
- Diagramma labiosum W. J. Macleay, 1883
- Diagramma melanacrum J. W. Johnson & J. E. Randall, 2001 (blackfin slatey)
- Diagramma pictum (Thunberg, 1792) (painted sweetlips)
- Diagramma punctatum G. Cuvier, 1830

== Systematics ==
Diagramma was originally used as a tautological name for Anthias diagramma in 1792 by Marcus Elieser Bloch in error for Linnaeus’s Perca diagramma, Lorenz Oken used Bloch’s taxon as the type species of the new genus Diagramma in 1917. This is a synonym for Carl Peter Thunberg’s Perca picta of 1792. Linnaeus did not explain why he used diagramma but it may mean “marked with lines”. Some authorities treat Diagramma as a synonym of Plectorhinchus, while others place D. centurio in Plectorhinchus although they maintain the other four Diagramma species in a separate genus.
