= Emmelichthyops =

Conservation status
- Least Concern (IUCN 3.1)

Scientific classification
- Kingdom: Animalia
- Phylum: Chordata
- Class: Actinopterygii
- Order: Acanthuriformes
- Family: Haemulidae
- Subfamily: Haemulinae
- Genus: Emmelichthyops; L. P. Schultz, 1945
- Species: E. atlanticus

Binomial name
- Emmelichthyops atlanticus L. P. Schultz, 1945

Species of fish

Emmelichthyops atlanticus, the bonnetmouth, is a marine fish species of grunt native to the western Atlantic Ocean, where it occurs from Florida and the Bahamas to northern South America. This species is the only known member of its genus.

== Description ==
The bonnetmouth has a cigar-shaped body and can grow up to 13 cm (5.1 in) in total length. Bonnetmouths are generally yellowish-gray, with some blue coloration on the front and silvery-white on the sides. Adults have four brown stripes on the upper halves of their bodies (one mid-dorsal), while juveniles have only three stripes. These stripes are usually more evident near the front and become more faded near the tail.

== Distribution and habitat ==
Found only in the western Atlantic Ocean, bonnetmouths can be seen from southern Florida and the Bahamas to northern South America. They can be captured most often near the Florida Keys, US Virgin Islands, and the Bahamas. The type specimens were both collected off the Bahamas' Cat Island. They are generally associated with reefs and can be found over coral heads in small groups. Bonnetmouths can be found at depths from 3–90 m (10–300 ft), but mainly occur in schools at about 64 m (210 ft). It feeds on invertebrates and small fishes.

== Systematics ==
Emmelichthyops atlanticus was first formally described in 1945 by the American ichthyologist Leonard Peter Schultz (1901-1986) with the type locality given as Cat Island in the Bahamas. It was formerly placed in the family Inermiidae. The generic name, Emmelichthyops, means "like Emmelichthys". At the time of its description this species was thought to be related to Emmelichthys and the two genera are similar.
