= Rhencus =

Scientific classification
- Kingdom: Animalia
- Phylum: Chordata
- Class: Actinopterygii
- Order: Acanthuriformes
- Family: Haemulidae
- Subfamily: Haemulinae
- Genus: Rhencus; Jordan & Evermann, 1896

Type species
- Pristipoma panamense Steindachner, 1875

Genus of ray-finned fishes

Rhencus is a genus of marine ray-finned fish, grunts belonging to the family Haemulidae. The species within the genus are found in the eastern Pacific Ocean. It is not yet recognised by Fishbase but is by the Catalog of Fishes.

== Species ==
The following species are classified within the genus Rhencus:

- Rhencus macracanthus (Gũnther, 1864) (longspine grunt)
- Rhencus panamensis Steindachner, 1875 (Panama grunt)

== Systematics ==
The type species of Rhencus is Pristipoma panamensis which Fishbase still places 'within the genus Pomadasys. Molecular studies now suggest that Pomadasys sensu lato is paraphyletic with the two Rhencus species being basal alongside Pomadasys argenteus, one reason Pomadasys was paraphyletic. The genus Rhencus Jordan & Evermann, 1896 was revived to include the species listed above, the name Pristipoma being unavailable as its type species is Lutjanus hasta, a junior synonym of P. argenteus.
