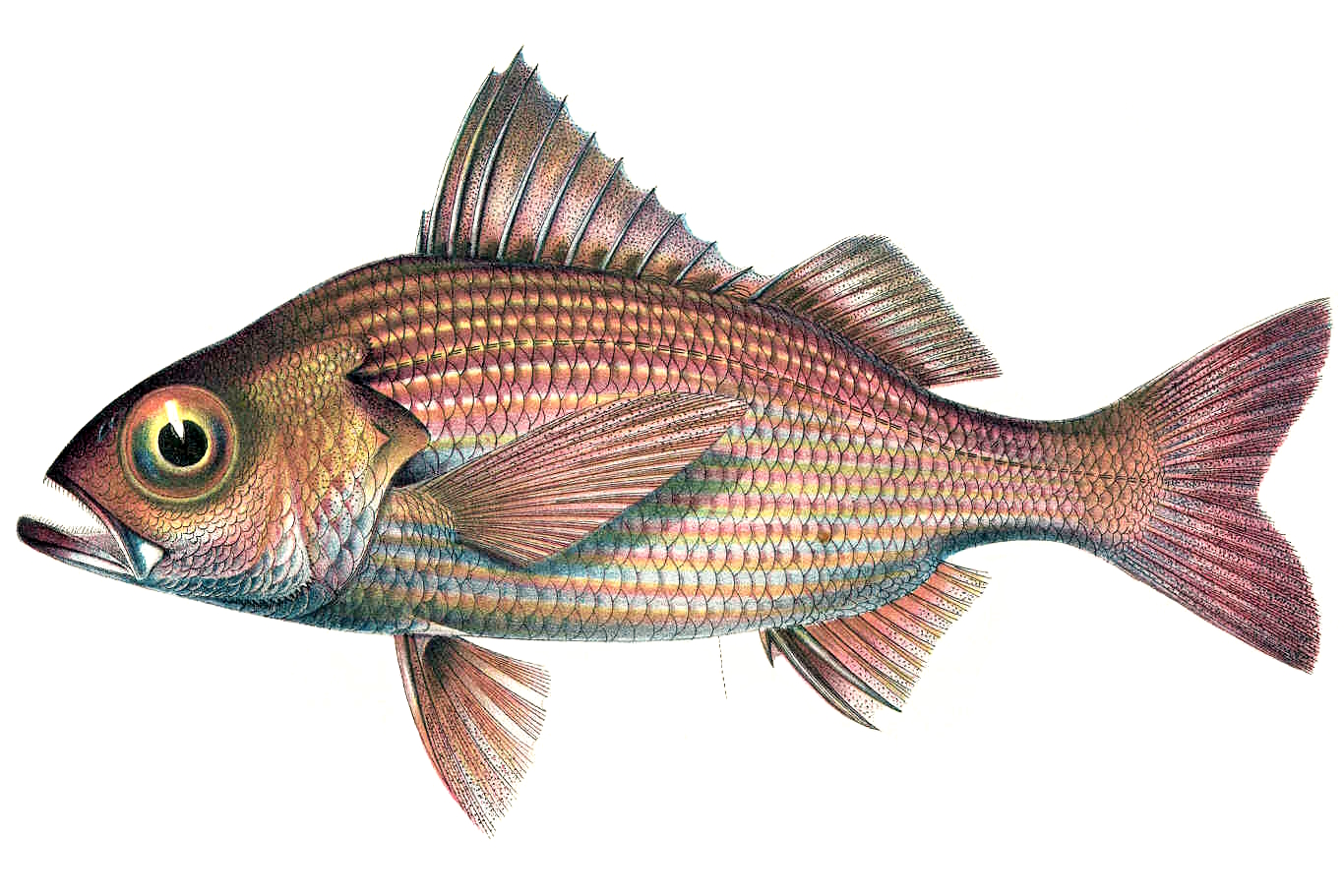

Conservation status
- Near Threatened (IUCN 3.1)

Scientific classification
- Kingdom: Animalia
- Phylum: Chordata
- Class: Actinopterygii
- Division: Teleostei
- Order: Acanthuriformes
- Family: Haemulidae
- Subfamily: Haemulinae
- Genus: Brachydeuterus; T. N. Gill, 1862
- Species: B. auritus

Binomial name
- Brachydeuterus auritus (Valenciennes, 1832)
- Range of Brachydeuterus auritus

Synonyms
- Genus: Otoperca Boulenger, 1915; Species: Larimus auritus Valenciennes, 1832; Otoperca aurita (Valenciennes, 1832); Pristipoma macrophthalmus Bleeker, 1863

= Bigeye grunt =

Species of fish

The bigeye grunt (Brachydeuterus auritus) is a species of marine ray-finned fish, a grunt belonging to the family Haemulidae. It is native to the Atlantic coast of Africa.

== Description ==
The bigeye grunt has an oblong, somewhat compressed body with a large eye, a snout which is shorter than the diameter of its eye and a large, protrusible mouth. It has a deeply notched dorsal fin which contains 10 to 13 spines, with the third spine (also occasionally the fourth) being the longest. The anal fin has three spines and nine or ten, infrequently eight, soft rays. The caudal fin is deeply emarginate. The back is olive and the flanks and abdomen are silvery to white. There is a dark blotch on upper edge of the gill cover and there are small dark spots on the base of the dorsal fin, although these are not always present. This species attains a maximum total length of 30 cm (12 in), although 23 cm (9.1 in) is more typical.

== Distribution ==
The bigeye grunt is found in the eastern Atlantic Ocean where it occurs along the western coast of Africa from Morocco to Angola, although it is most common from Senegal south.

== Habitat and biology ==
The bigeye grunt is found at depths between 10 and 150 m (33 and 492 ft). It can be found on Sandy and muddy substrates, moving up the water column to feed near the surface during the night. It feeds on small fish and invertebrates. This species may spawn throughout the year, becoming sexually mature at around 8 months old for males and 12 months for females, but there may be two peaks in spawning coinciding with the timing of upwellings.

== Systematics ==
The bigeye grunt was first formally described in 1832 as Larimus auritus by the French zoologist Achille Valenciennes 1794-1865) with the type locality given as Gorée in Senegal. It is the only species in the monotypic genus Brachydeuterus. The generic name is a compound of brachy meaning "short" and deuterus meaning "second", a reference to the lower Sony rayed part of the dorsal fin which is almost separated from the anterior spiny part by a deep notch. The specific name auritus means "eared" and is areference to the blotch on the gill cover.

== Utilisation ==
Global capture production of Bigeye grunt (Brachydeuterus auritus) in thousand tonnes from 1950 to 2022, as reported by the FAO

The bigeye grunt is commercially important in many parts of West Africa, especially Ghana and Côte d'Ivoire. They are caught using bottom trawls, gill nets, set nets and push seines. They are sold fresh, smoked it processed into fish meal. It has also been used to make fish crackers when its flesh is mixed with cassava.
