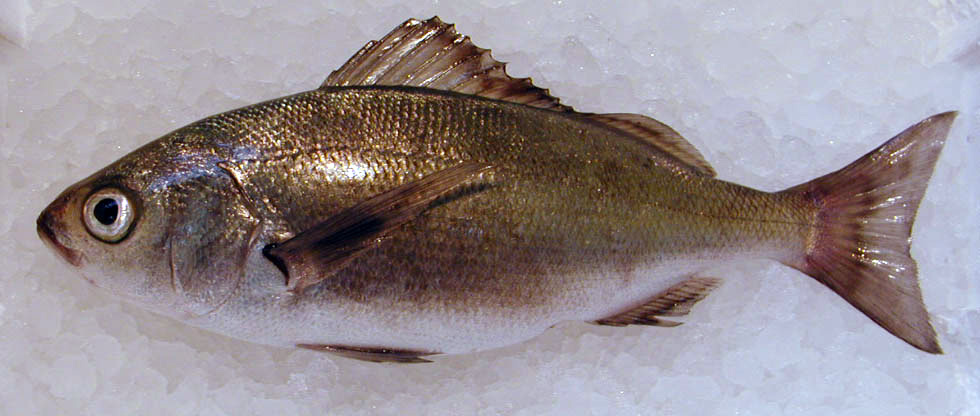

Conservation status
- Least Concern (IUCN 3.1)

Scientific classification
- Kingdom: Animalia
- Phylum: Chordata
- Class: Actinopterygii
- Order: Acanthuriformes
- Family: Haemulidae
- Subfamily: Haemulinae
- Genus: Isacia; D. S. Jordan & Fesler, 1893
- Species: I. conceptionis

Binomial name
- Isacia conceptionis (G. Cuvier, 1830)

Synonyms
- Pristipoma conceptionis G. Cuvier, 1830; Isacia venusta Starks, 1906

= Isacia =

Genus of ray-finned fishes

Isacia conceptionis, the Cabinza grunt, is a species of grunt native to the Pacific Coast of South America and Nicaragua. It can be found at depths of 0 to 50 m (0 to 164 ft) in areas with rocky or sandy substrates. This species grows to 60 cm (24 in) in TL, with a maximum known weight of 1.83 kg (4.0 lb). It is important to local commercial fisheries. I. conceptionis is the only valid member of its genus.
