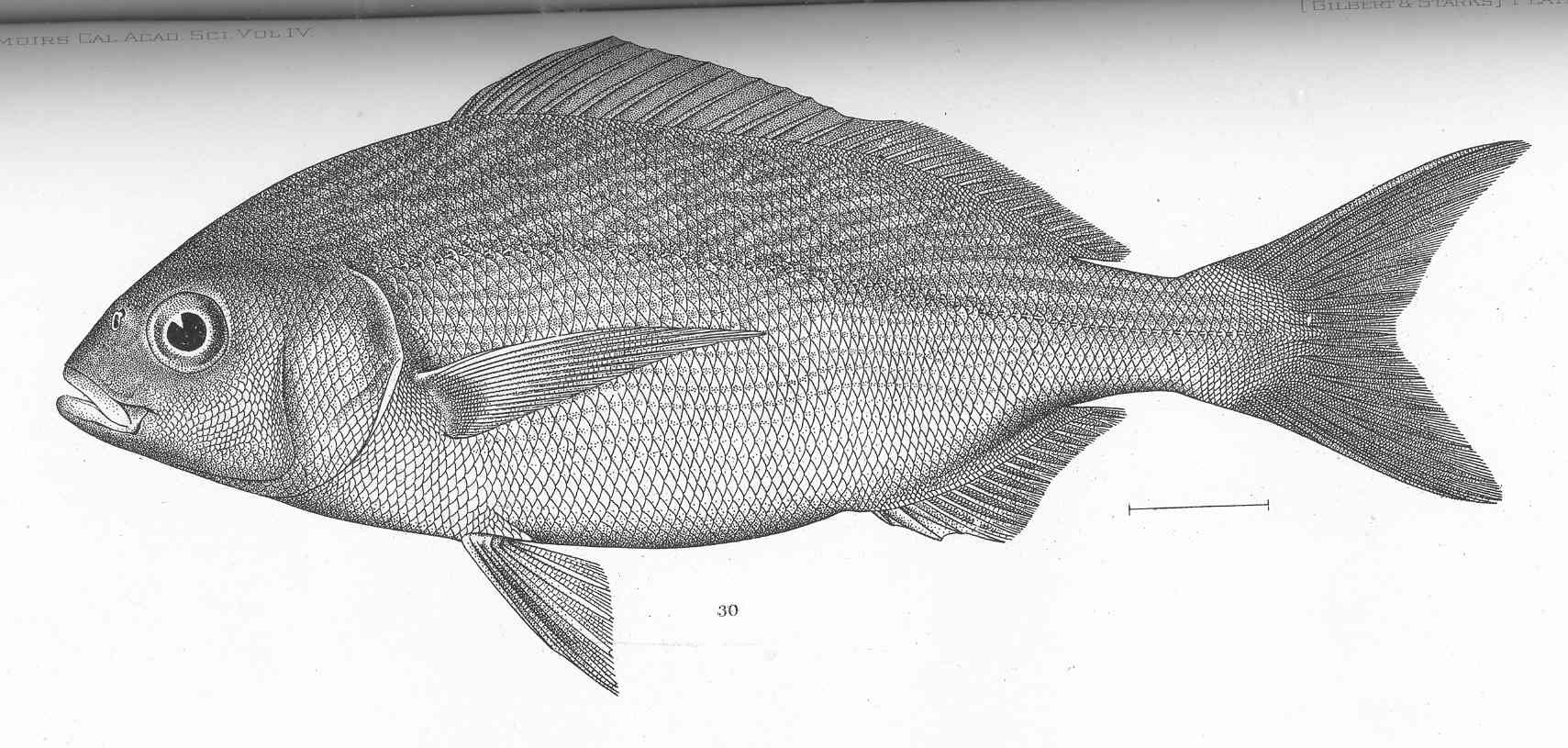
- Microlepidotus brevipinnis

Scientific classification
- Kingdom: Animalia
- Phylum: Chordata
- Class: Actinopterygii
- Order: Acanthuriformes
- Family: Haemulidae
- Subfamily: Haemulinae
- Genus: Microlepidotus; T. N. Gill, 1862

Type species
- Microlepidotus inornatus T. N. Gill, 1862

Synonyms
- Isaciella D. S. Jordan & Fesler, 1893

= Microlepidotus =

Genus of ray-finned fishes

Microlepidotus is a genus of grunts native to the Pacific coast of North America. The currently recognized species in this genus are:

- Microlepidotus brevipinnis (Steindachner, 1869) (humpback grunt)
- Microlepidotus inornatus T. N. Gill, 1862 (wavyline grunt)
