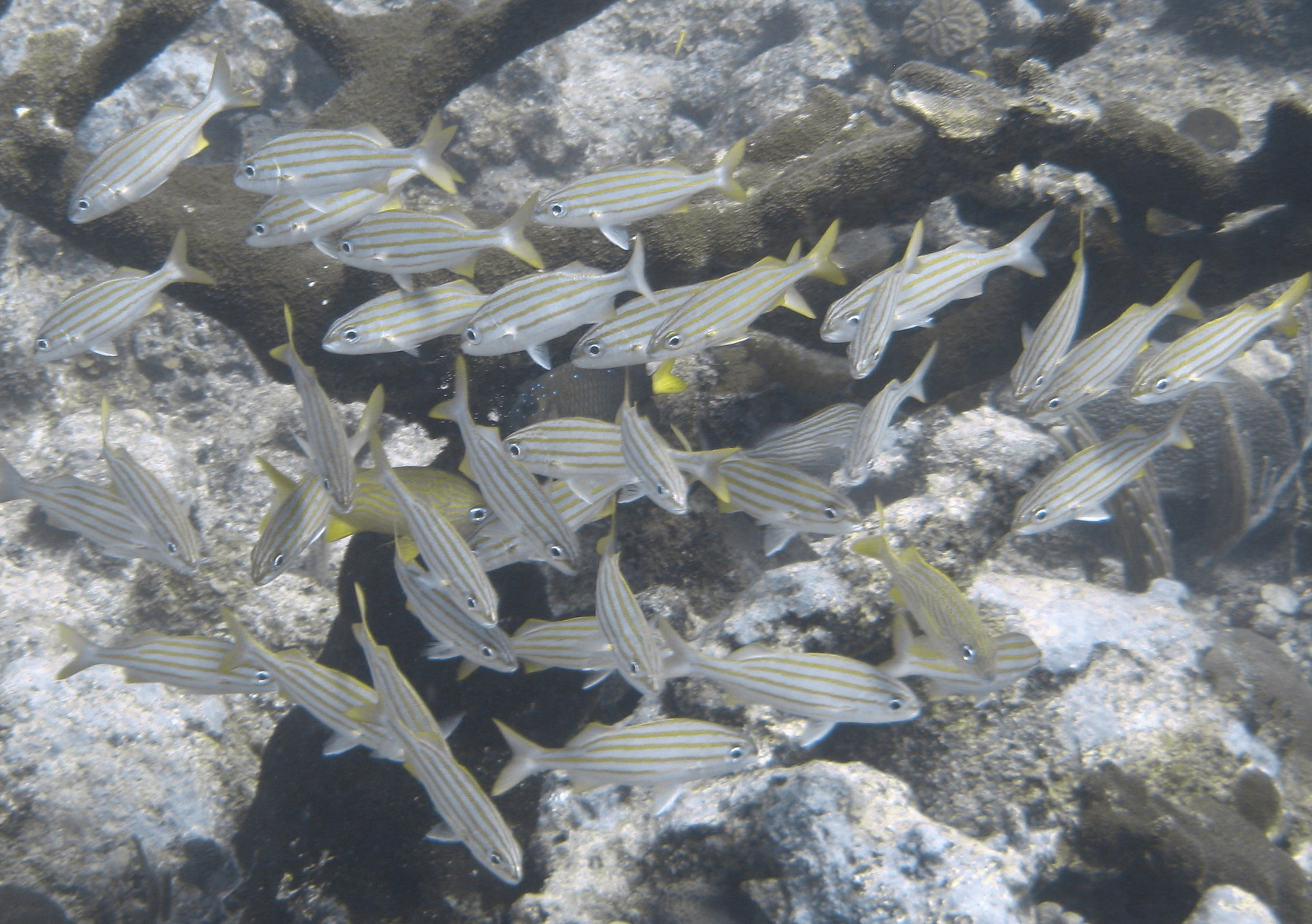

Conservation status
- Least Concern (IUCN 3.1)

Scientific classification
- Kingdom: Animalia
- Phylum: Chordata
- Class: Actinopterygii
- Order: Acanthuriformes
- Family: Haemulidae
- Genus: Brachygenys
- Species: B. chrysargyrea

Binomial name
- Brachygenys chrysargyrea (Günther, 1859)

Synonyms
- Haemulon chrysargyreum Günther, 1859; Brachygenys chrysargyreus (Günther, 1859); Haemulon taeniatum Poey, 1860; Brachygenys taeniata (Poey, 1860)

= Brachygenys chrysargyrea =

Species of fish

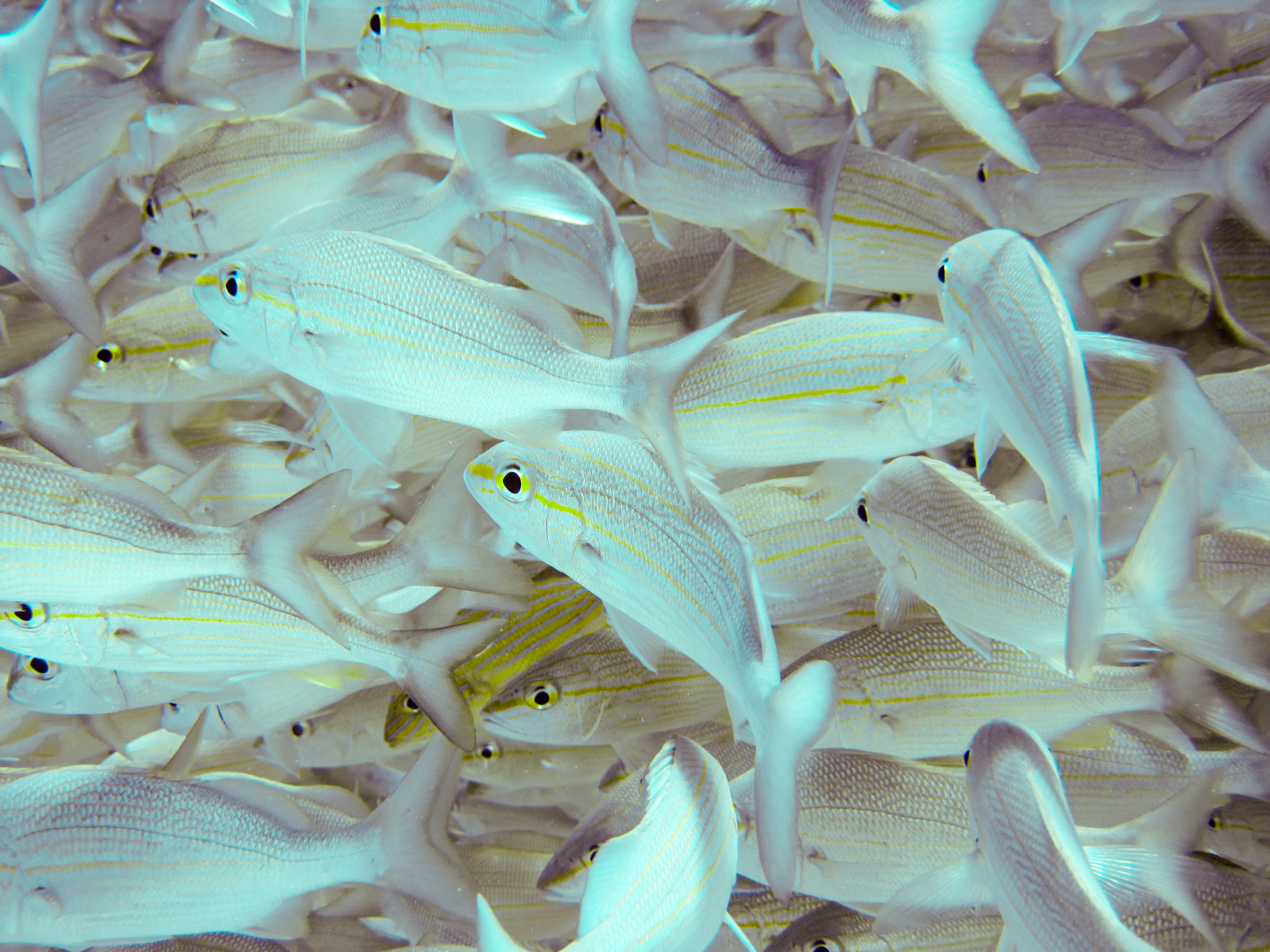
A school of smallmouth grunt at the Florida Keys National Marine Sanctuary

Brachygenys chrysargyrea, the smallmouth grunt, bronze grunt, or yellowstripe grunt, is a species of marine ray-finned fish, a grunt belonging to the family Haemulidae. It is found in the western Atlantic Ocean.

== Description ==
B. chrysargyrea is a small fish that can reach a maximum length of 23 cm (9.1 in), but a length of 17 cm (6.7 in) is typical. It has a short snout with an almost horizontal mouth which is small, the jaws normally not extending as far as the front margin of the pupil. The inside of the mouth is red. It has a laterally compressed body with a forked caudal fin. Its background color is silver with five bronze-yellow horizontal lines on its sides.All fins, other than the pectoral fins are partially or completely yellow. The dorsal fin contains 12 spines and 13 soft rays while the anal fin has 3 spines and 9–10 soft rays.

== Distribution and habitat ==
B. chrysargyrea is widespread throughout the western Atlantic Ocean from south Florida to the cost of Brazil, including the Gulf of Mexico and the Caribbean Sea.

The adults inhabit exposed areas of coral reefs and rocky coasts up to 25 m (82 ft) deep. Juveniles prefer hard substrates and around coral reefs or Thalassia sea grass beds.

== Biology ==
B. chrysargyrea is nocturnal, spending the daytime in schools near reefs or rocks and disperse at night to feed at the open sea. Their diet consists mainly of plankton, but also small crustaceans and other mollusks. Off the Fernando de Noronha Islands of northeastern Brazil it has been observed that this species and the yellow goatfish (Mulloidichthys martinicus) mimic each other in colour and shape, allowing them to form mixed schools, which improves their ability to avoid predators that rely on vision for hunting.

== Systematics ==
B. chrysargyrea was first formally described in 1859 by German-born British ichthyologist and herpetologist Albert Günther (1830–1914), with the type locality given as Trinidad. The specific name is a compound of the Greek chrysos meaning "gold" and argyreum meaning "silvery", a reference to the silvery background colour marked with gold streaks and stripes.

Cuban zoologist Felipe Poey (1799–1891) described a species of grunt he named Haemulon taeniatum in 1860. He placed this species in the new genus Brachygenys in 1868. Poey's taxon was later ascertained to be a junior synonym of Günther's. Molecular studies have suggested that Haemulon sensu lato is polyphyletic because they showed that Haemulon chrysargyreum clustered with Xenistius californiensis, rendering Haemulon as polyphyletic if Xenistius was not included. The genus Brachygenys, was revived to include Xenistius californiensis, Haemulon chrysargyreum, Xenistius peruanus and Xenocys jessiae. As Brachygenys is feminine the specific name is feminised to chrysargyrea.

== Uses ==
B. chrysargyrea is caught as bycatch in traps, the fish caught being sold fresh. It is rare in the aquarium trade but is commoner in public aquarium displays.
