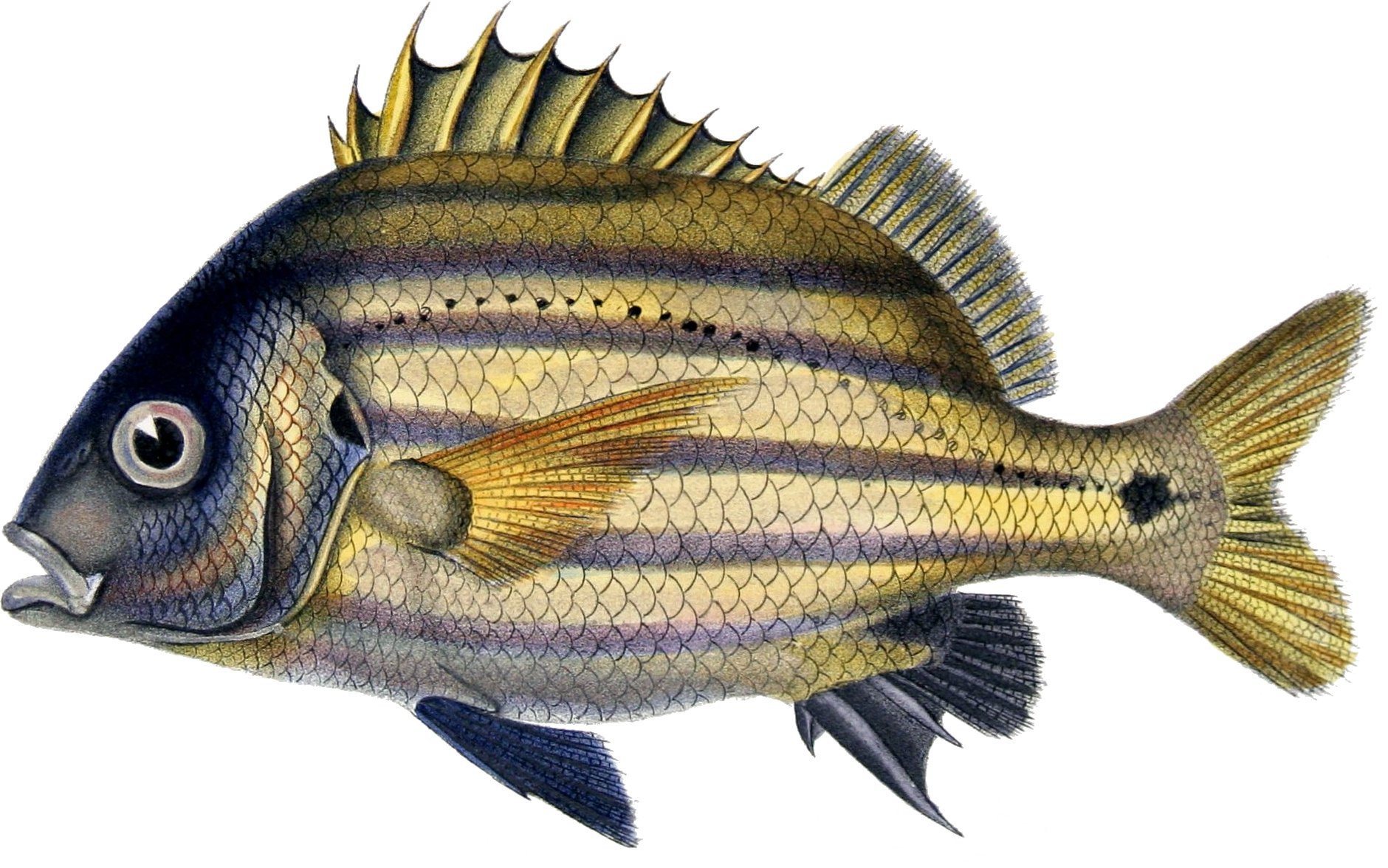

Conservation status
- Least Concern (IUCN 3.1)

Scientific classification
- Kingdom: Animalia
- Phylum: Chordata
- Class: Actinopterygii
- Division: Teleostei
- Order: Acanthuriformes
- Family: Haemulidae
- Genus: Paranisotremus
- Species: P. moricandi

Binomial name
- Paranisotremus moricandi (Ranzani, 1842)

Synonyms
- Haemulon moricandi Ranzani, 1842

= Brownstriped grunt =

Species of fish

The brownstriped grunt (Paranisotremus moricandi), also known as the burro, is a species of marine ray-finned fish, a grunt belonging to the family Haemulidae. It is the only species in the monotypic genus Paranisotremus. It is native to the western Atlantic Ocean.

== Description ==
The brownstriped grunt has a deep and compressed body with a blunt head with the mouth positioned low. The mouth is small with fleshy lips and bands of teeth on the jaws, the outer band of teeth being conical in shape. The dorsal finis continuous but has a deep notch. This fin contains 12 spines, the 4th spine being the longest, and 15-17 soft rays. The anal fin has 3 spines, the second being very large, and 9 soft rays. The background colour of the body is dark brown and there are 5-6 cream to yellow horizontal stripes. The paler stripes may be broader or narrower than the dark stripes. The caudal peduncle has a black blotch and it has two small saddle spots on its upper caudal part in juveniles which fade as the fish matures. The head is dark brown with a large vertical whitish area on the gill cover. There is a pair of pale stripes below eye and a dark blotch on the rear of the gill cover. The pelvic fins are dark brown the other fins being a paler brown. This species attains a maximum total length of 15 cm (5.9 in).

== Distribution ==
The brownstriped grunt is found in the tropical Western Atlantic Ocean. It has a discontinuous distribution. It occurs from the Caribbean coast of southern Costa Rica to Santa Marta in Colombia, from Curaçao to the Gulf of Paria off Venezuela and off northeastern Brazil where it is found from Sao Luis to Espírito Santo.

== Habitat and biology ==
The brownstriped grunt is found on shallow rocky reefs in coastal waters, preferring turbid continental coasts rather than islands. It is mainly nocturnal hiding during the day in crevices. It is found in small groups or as solitary fish. It feeds on benthic invertebrates and some filamentous algae.

== Systematics ==
The brownstriped grunt was first formally described in 1842 as Haemulon moricandi by the Italian catholic priest and naturalist Camillo Ranzani (1775–1841) with the type locality given as Brazilian seas. Some authorities treat this species as being the only member of the monospecific genus Paranisotremus. The specific name honours Moïse Etienne (Stéfano) Moricand (1779–1854), who was treasurer and secretary of the Geneva Natural History Museum and who donated a collection of fish specimens from Brazil to that museum.

== Utilisation ==
The brownstriped grunt is nota target for commercial fisheries, it may be caught by artisanal fisheries in some parts of its range. It occasionally appears in the aquarium trade.
