= Haemulopsis =

Scientific classification
- Kingdom: Animalia
- Phylum: Chordata
- Class: Actinopterygii
- Order: Acanthuriformes
- Family: Haemulidae
- Subfamily: Haemulinae
- Genus: Haemulopsis; Steindachner, 1868

Type species
- Haemulon corvinaeforme Steindachner, 1868

Species
- see Text

Genus of ray-finned fishes

Haemulopsis is a genus of marine ray-finned fish, grunts belonging to the family Haemulidae. They are native to the western Atlantic Ocean and, mainly, to the eastern Pacific Ocean.

== Species ==
The currently recognized species in this genus are:

- Haemulopsis axillaris Steindachner, 1869) (yellowstripe grunt)
- Haemulopsis corvinaeformis (Steindachner, 1868) (roughneck grunt)
- Haemulopsis elongatus (Steindachner, 1879) (elongated grunt)
- Haemulopsis leuciscus (Günther, 1864) (raucous grunt)
- Haemulopsis nitidus (Steindachner, 1869) (shining grunt)

All of these apart from H. corvinaeformis, which is found in the western Atlantic Ocean, are found in the eastern Pacific Ocean.
