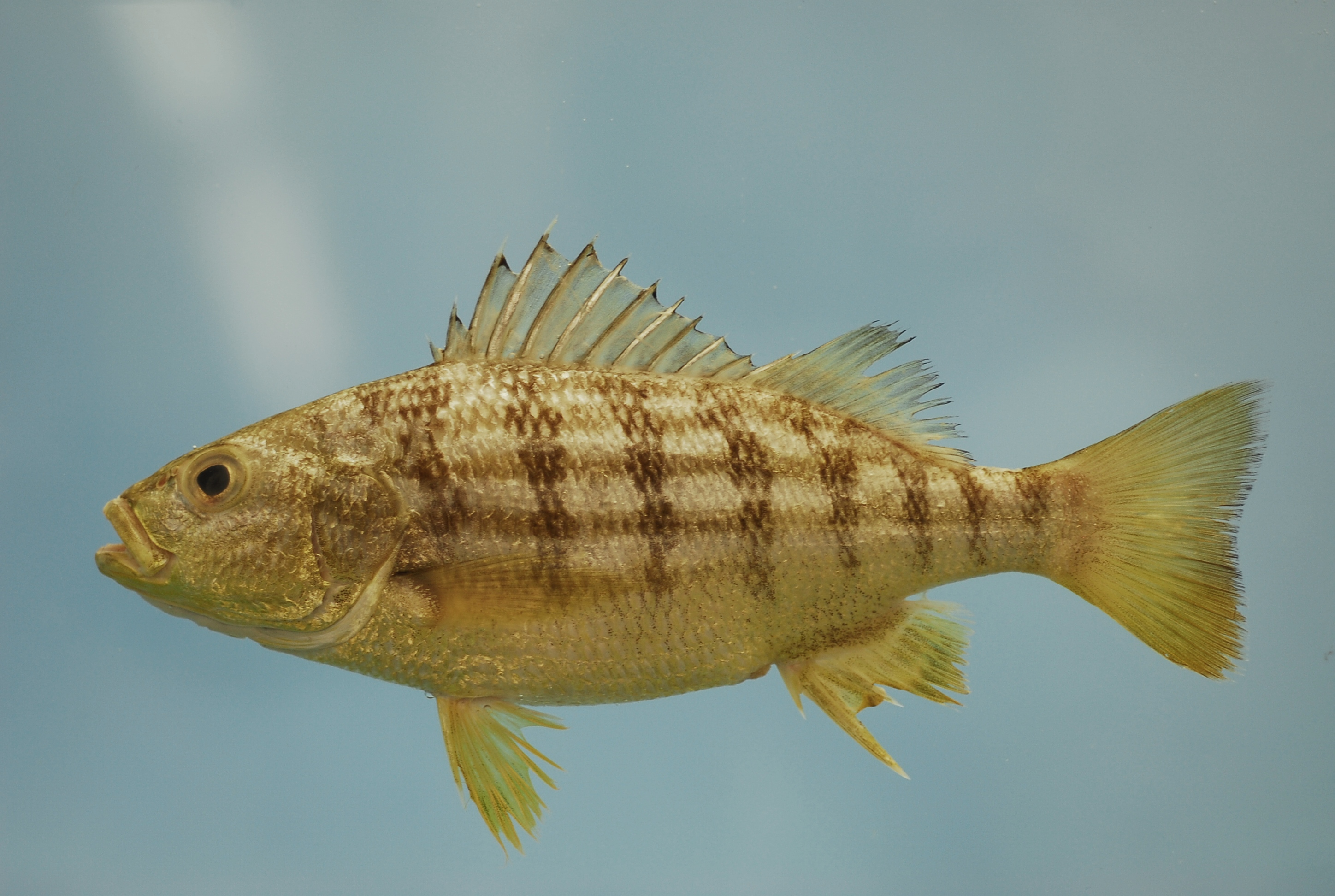
- Conodon nobilis

Scientific classification
- Domain: Eukaryota
- Kingdom: Animalia
- Phylum: Chordata
- Class: Actinopterygii
- Order: Acanthuriformes
- Family: Haemulidae
- Subfamily: Haemulinae
- Genus: Conodon; G. Cuvier, 1830

Type species
- Conodon antillanus G Cuvier, 1830

Synonyms
- Apostata Heckel, 1860; Spinipercina Fowler, 1944

= Conodon =

Genus of ray-finned fishes

Conodon, from Ancient Greek κῶνος (kōnos), meaning "cone", and ὀδούς (odoús), meaning "tooth", is a genus of grunts native to the Pacific and Atlantic coasts of the Americas. The currently recognized species in this genus are:

- Conodon macrops Hildebrand, 1946 (lemoneye grunt)
- Conodon nobilis Linnaeus, 1758 (barred grunt)
- Conodon serrifer D. S. Jordan & C. H. Gilbert, 1882 (armed grunt)
