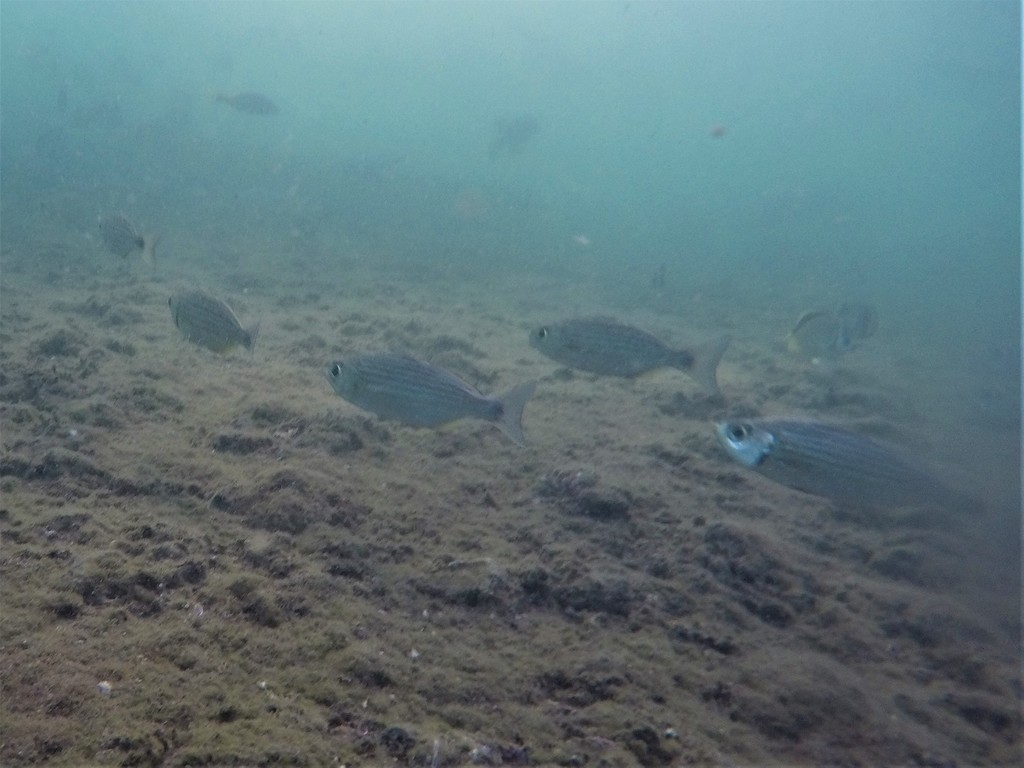
- Xenichthys xanti

Scientific classification
- Kingdom: Animalia
- Phylum: Chordata
- Class: Actinopterygii
- Order: Acanthuriformes
- Family: Haemulidae
- Subfamily: Haemulinae
- Genus: Xenichthys; T. N. Gill, 1863

Type species
- Xenichthys xanti T. N. Gill, 1863

Synonyms
- Cheiroxenichthys Fowler, 1930

= Xenichthys =

Genus of ray-finned fishes

Xenichthys is a genus of grunts native to the eastern Pacific Ocean.

== Species ==
The currently recognized species in this genus are:

- Xenichthys agassizii Steindachner, 1876
- Xenichthys rupestris Hildebrand, 1946
- Xenichthys xanti T. N. Gill, 1863 (longfin salema)
