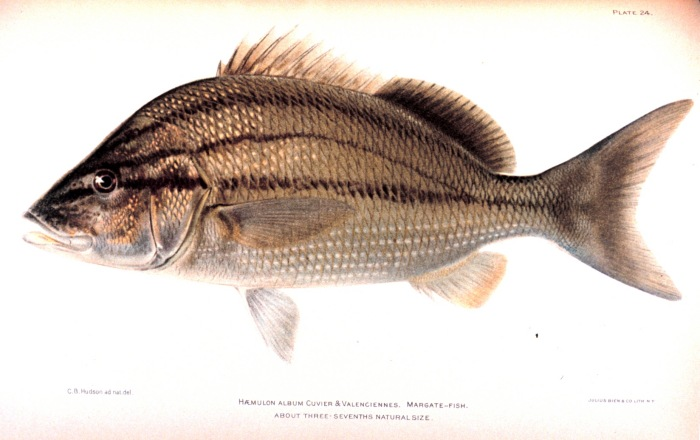
- Haemulon album

Scientific classification
- Kingdom: Animalia
- Phylum: Chordata
- Class: Actinopterygii
- Order: Acanthuriformes
- Family: Haemulidae; T. N. Gill, 1885

Subfamilies
- Haemulinae Gill, 1885; Plectorhynchinae Jordan & Thompson 1912

Synonyms
- Pomadasyidae Regan, 1913; Inermiidae Jordan, 1923

= Haemulidae =

Grunts Temporal range: Lutetian to present

Family of fishes

Haemulidae is a family of fishes in the order Acanthuriformes known commonly as grunts. It is made up of the two subfamilies Haemulinae (grunts) and Plectorhynchinae (sweetlips), which contain about 133 species in 19 genera around the world. These fishes are commonly found in tropical, subtropical, and warm temperate regions, inhabiting marine, brackish, and sometimes fresh waters.

The family shows many feeding adaptations from bottom-feeding predation to water-column planktivory and is named for the ability of Haemulinae to produce sounds by grinding their pharyngeal teeth. Some species engage in mutualistic relationships with cleaner gobies of the genus Elacatinus, allowing them to feed on ectoparasites on their bodies.

== Subfamilies and genera ==
The family Haemulidae is divided into the following subfamilies and genera:

- Haemulinae
  - Anisotremus Gill 1861
  - Boridia Cuvier, 1830
  - Brachydeuterus Gill, 1862
  - Brachygenys Poey, 1868
  - Conodon Cuvier, 1830
  - Emmelichthyops Schultz, 1945
  - Haemulon Cuvier, 1829
  - Haemulopsis Steindachner, 1869
  - Isacia Jordan & Fesler, 1893
  - Microlepidotus Gill, 1862
  - Orthopristis Girard, 1858
  - Parakuhlia Pellegrin, 1913
  - Paranisotremus Tavera, Acero & Wainwright, 2018
  - Pomadasys Lacépède, 1802
  - Rhencus Jordan & Evermann, 1896
  - Rhonciscus Jordan & Evermann, 1896
  - Xenichthys Gill, 1862
- Plectorhynchinae
  - Diagramma Oken, 1817
  - Genyatremus Gill, 1862
  - Parapristipoma Bleeker, 1873
  - Plectorhinchus Lacépède, 1802

One of the earliest known fossil grunts is †Pomadasys sadeki (Joleaud & Cuvillier, 1933) (formerly placed in its own genus, Kemtichthys) from the Middle Eocene-aged Mokattam Formation of Egypt.

== See also ==
- List of fish families
