= List of crustaceans of Ireland =

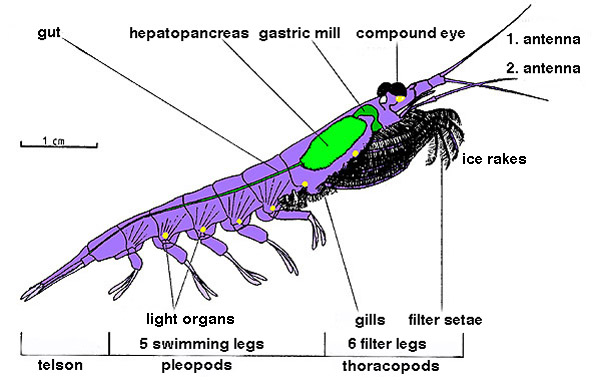
Diagram of a typical crustacean (Euphausia superba), showing the usual bodyplan.

There are 1,774 species of crustaceans recorded in Ireland.

Crustaceans are arthropods of the subphylum Crustacea. Most are aquatic, such as shrimp, barnacles, lobsters, crayfish, krill, but some are also adapted for land living, such as woodlice and crabs.

== Class Branchiopoda (water fleas, etc.) ==
=== Order Anomopoda ===
==== Family Bosminidae ====
- Bosmina sp.

==== Family Chydoridae ====
41 species, including:

- Kurzia latissima

==== Family Eurycercidae ====
- Eurycercus lamellatus
- Eurycercus glacialis

==== Family Ilyocryptidae ====
- Ilyocryptus sordidus

==== Family Daphniidae ====
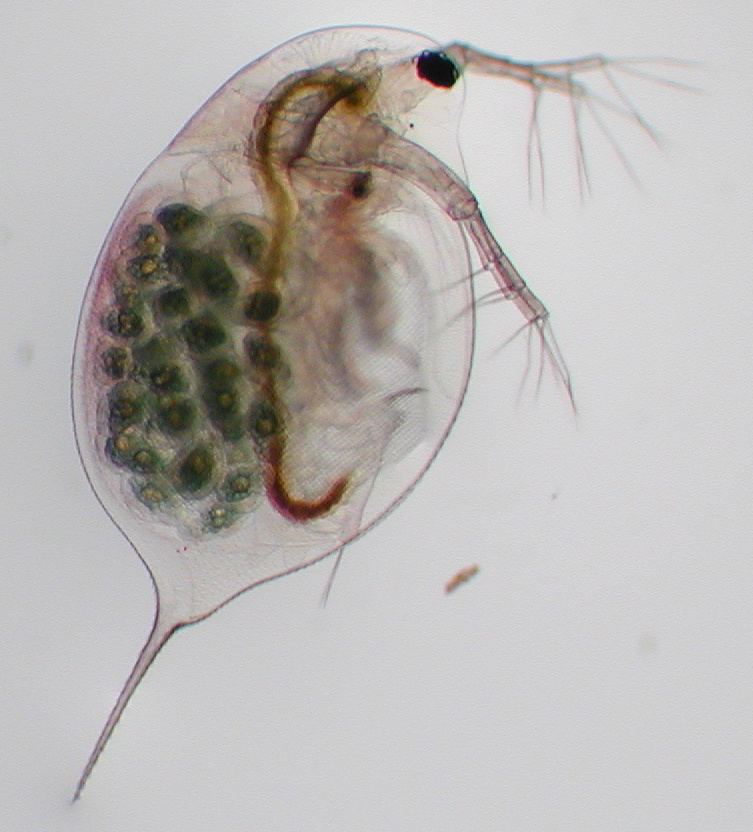
Female adult Daphnia longispina with eggs; a freshwater water flea

12 species, including:

- Ceriodaphnia quadrangula
- Daphnia longispina
- Daphnia pulex
- Simocephalus vetulus

==== Family Macrothricidae ====
8 species

=== Order Ctenopoda ===
==== Family Sididae ====
3 species, including:

- Sida crystallina
- Latona setifera

==== Family Holopediidae ====
1 species

=== Order Haplopoda ===
==== Family Leptodoridae ====
1 species

=== Order Onychopoda ===
==== Family Polyphemidae ====
1 species

- Polyphemus pediculus

==== Family Cercopagididae ====
2 species

==== Family Podonidae ====
4 species

== Class Malacostraca ==
=== Order Leptostraca ===
==== Family Nebaliidae ====
2 species, including:

- Nebalia bipes

=== Order Stomatopoda ===
==== Family Nannosquillidae ====
1 species

==== Family Squillidae ====
1 species

=== Order Amphipoda ===
==== Family Aoridae ====
15 species, including:

- Aora gracilis
- Lembos websteri
- Microdeutopus anomalus

==== Family Ampeliscidae ====
15 species, including:

- Ampelisca aequicornis
- Ampelisca brevicornis
- Ampelisca diadema
- Ampelisca spinipes
- Ampelisca tenuicornis
- Ampelisca typica

==== Family Ampithoidae ====
6 species, including:

- Amphitholina cuniculus
- Ampithoe gammaroides
- Ampithoe helleri
- Ampithoe rubricata
- Sunamphitoe pelagica

==== Family Calliopiidae ====
- Calliopius laeviusculus

==== Family Caprellidae (skeleton shrimps, ghost shrimps) ====
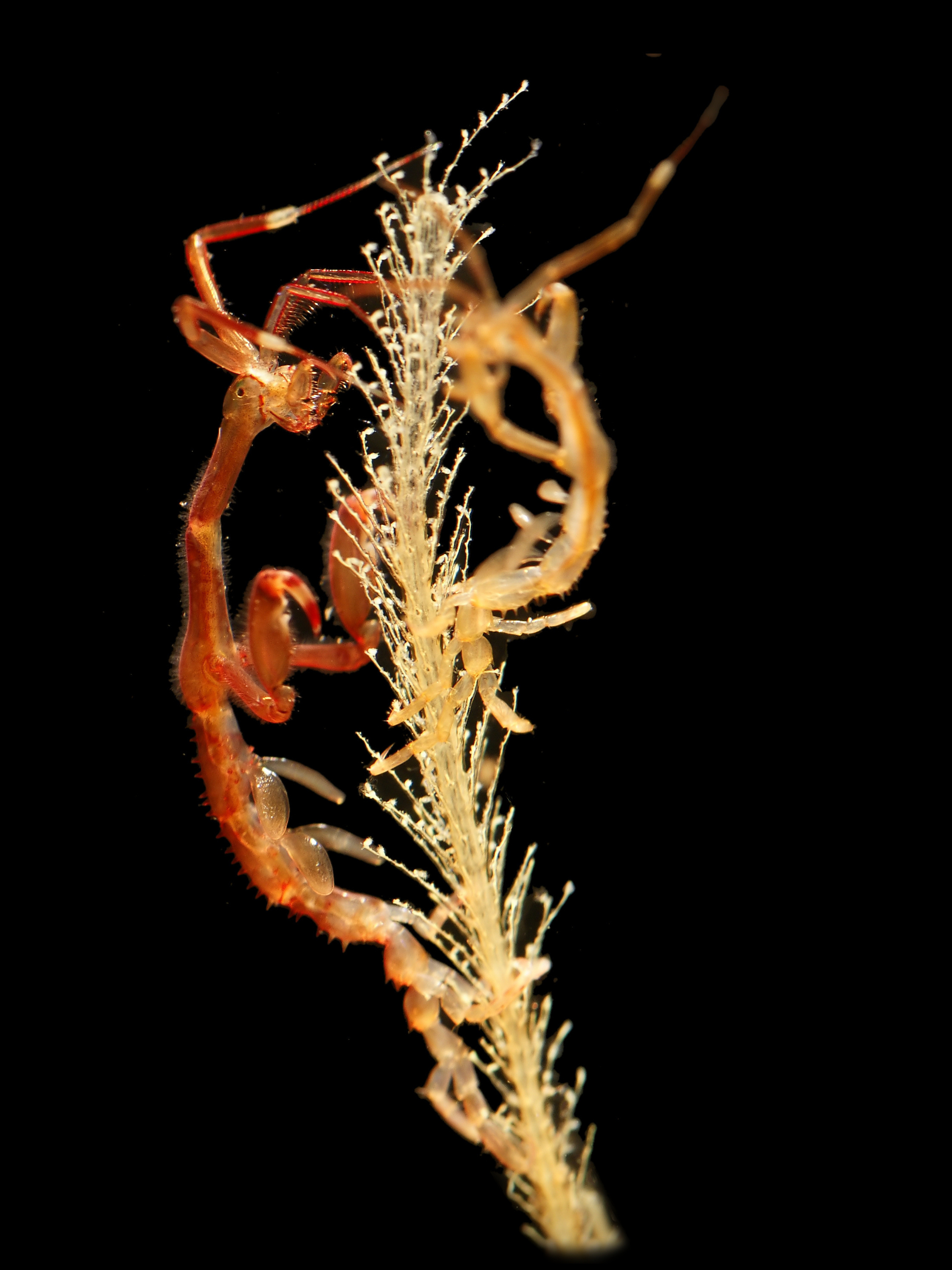
Japanese skeleton shrimp

11 species, including:

- Caprella acanthifera
- Caprella equilibra
- Caprella linearis (linear skeleton shrimp)
- Caprella mutica (Japanese skeleton shrimp)
- Phtisica marina
- Pariambus typicus

==== Family Cheirocratidae ====
1 species:

- Cheirocratus sundevalli

==== Family Corophiidae ====
14 species, including:

- Chelicorophium chelicorne
- Corophium arenarium
- Corophium crassicorne
- Corophium curvispinum
- Corophium volutator
- Ericthonius punctatus

==== Family Crangonyctidae ====
1 species:

- Crangonyx pseudogracilis

==== Family Eusiridae ====
6 species

==== Family Calliopidae ====
1 species

==== Family Dexaminidae ====
8 species, including:

- Dexamine spinosa

==== Family Eulimnogammaridae ====
- Eulimnogammarus obtusatus

==== Family Gammaridae ====
15–16 species, including:

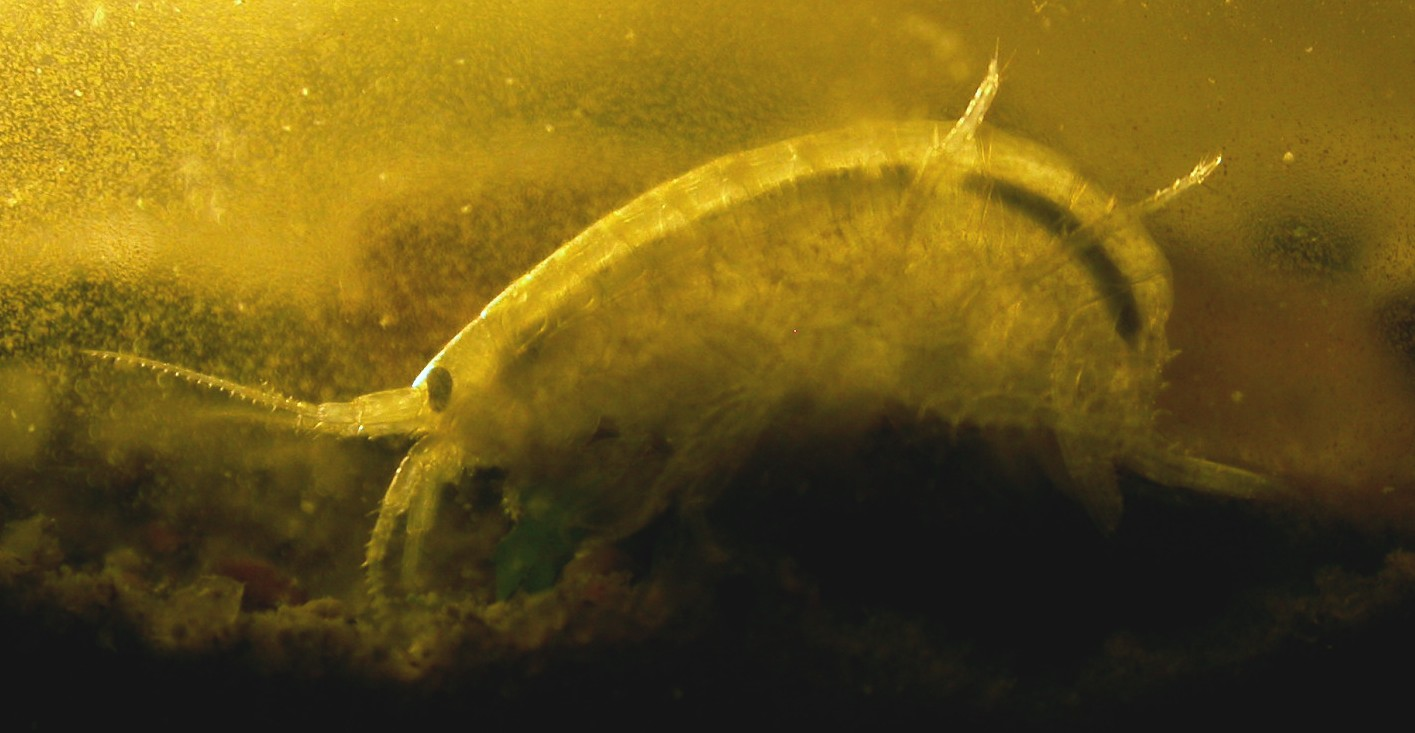
Gammarus lacustris

- Echinogammarus marinus
- Echinogammarus pirloti
- Echinogammarus stoerensis
- Gammarus duebeni
- Gammarus finmarchicus
- Gammarus lacustris
- Gammarus locusta
- Gammarus pulex
- Gammarus tigrinus
- Gammarus zaddachi

==== Family Gammarellidae ====
2 species

==== Family Megaluropidae ====
1 species:

- Megaluropus agilis

==== Family Talitridae (landhoppers, sandhoppers, sand fleas) ====
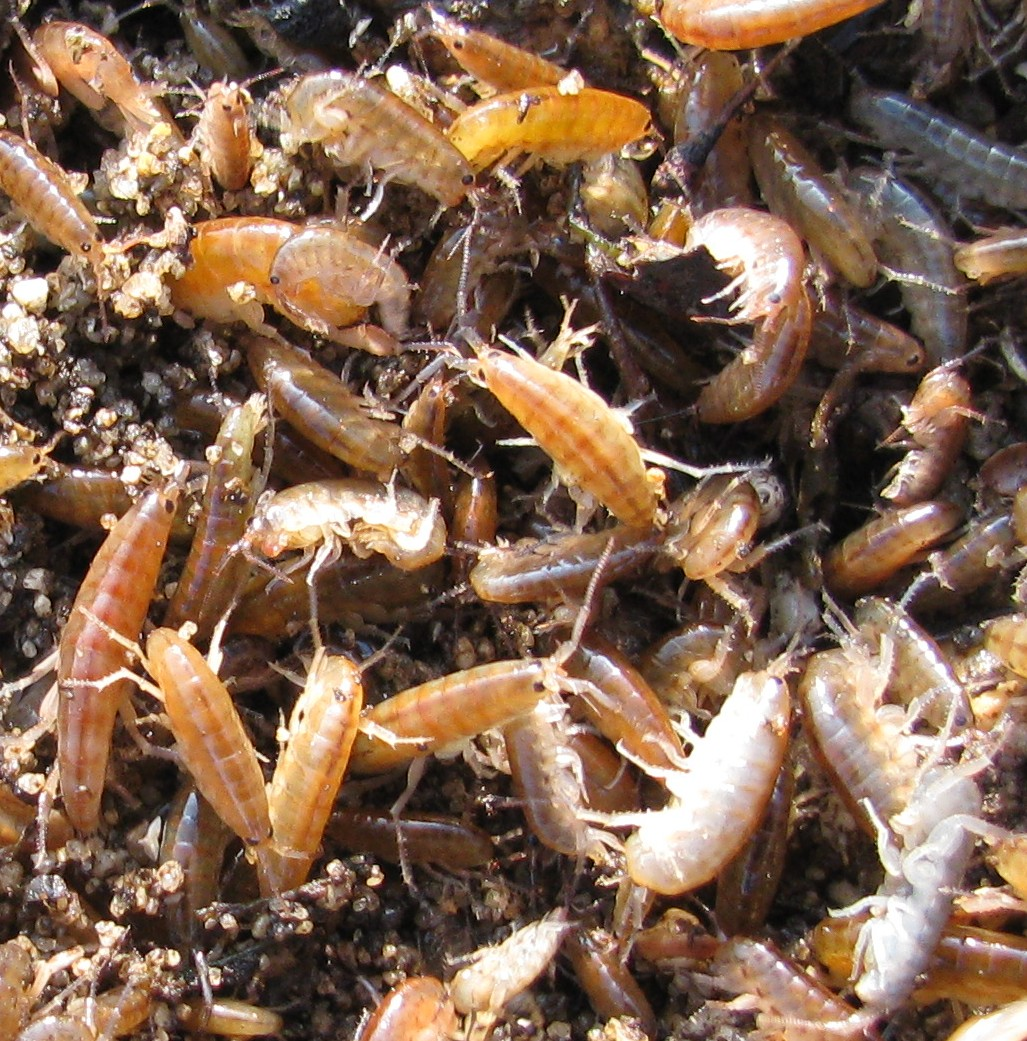
Orchestia gammarellus

6 species:

- Arcitalitrus dorrieni (lawn shrimp)
- Orchestia gammarellus
- Orchestia mediterranea
- Pseudorchestoidea brito
- Talitrus saltator
- Talorchestia deshayesii

==== Family Melphidippidae ====
2 species

==== Family Haustoriidae ====
1 species:

- Haustorius arenarius

==== Family Hyperiidae ====
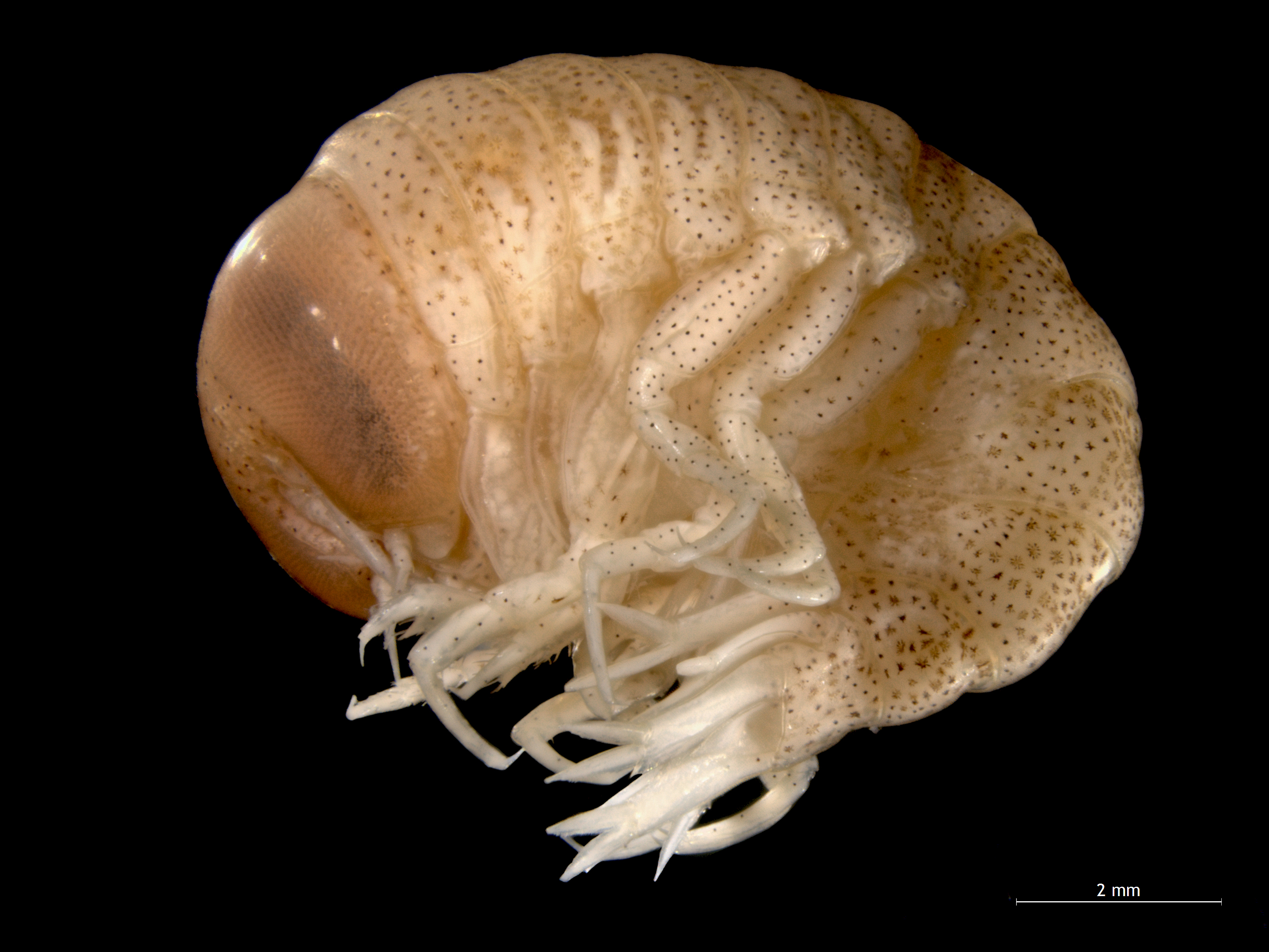
Hyperia galba, part of the zooplankton

7 species, including:

- Hyperia galba

==== Family Hyalidae ====
6 species, including:

- Hyale pontica
- Hyale prevostii
- Hyale stebbingi

==== Family Ischyroceridae ====
14 species, including:

- Ischyrocerus anguipes
- Jassa falcata (scud)
- Parajassa pelagica
- Siphonoecetes kroyeranus

==== Family Leucothoidae ====
4 species, including:

- Leucothoe lilljeborgi

==== Family Colomastigidae ====
1 species

==== Family Cressidae ====
- Cressa dubia

==== Family Stenothoidae ====
10 species, including:

- Stenothoe marina

==== Family Lysianassidae ====
42 species, including:

- Lysianassa ceratina
- Orchomenella nana

==== Family Synopiidae ====
2 species

==== Family Argissidae ====
1 species

==== Family Iphimediidae ====
6 species

==== Family Stegocephalidae ====
1 species

==== Family Acanthonotozomellidae ====
1 species

==== Family Epimeriidae ====
1 species

==== Family Liljeborgiidae ====
3 species

==== Family Pardaliscidae ====
1 species

==== Family Melitidae ====
13 species, including:

- Melita palmata
- Abludomelita obtusata
- Maerella tenuimana

==== Family Niphargidae ====
3 species:

- Microniphargus leruthi
- Niphargus kochianus subsp. irlandicus
- Niphargus wexfordensis

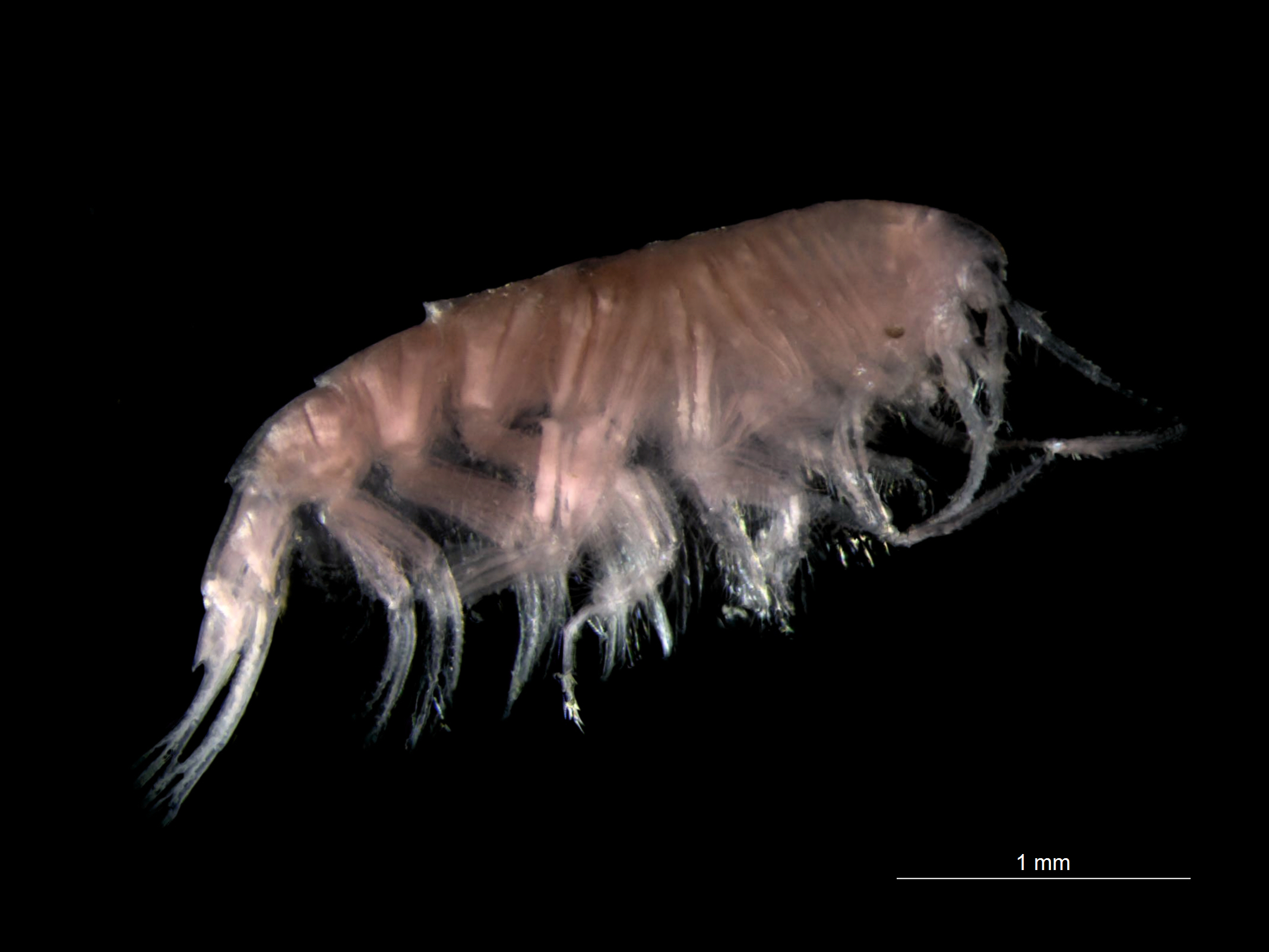
Perioculodes longimanus

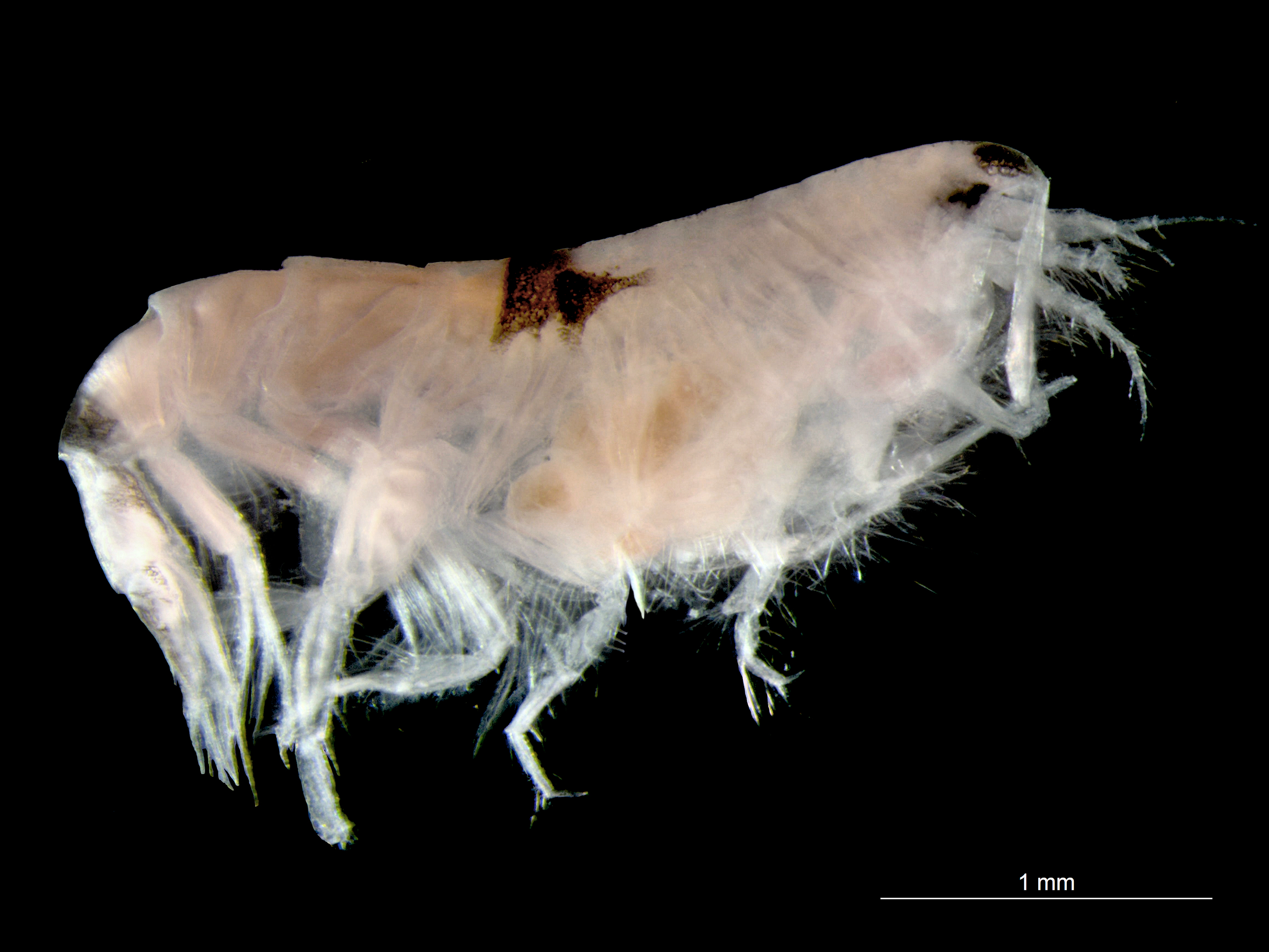
Synchelidium maculatum

==== Family Oedicerotidae ====
11 species, including:

- Perioculodes longimanus
- Pontocrates altamarinus
- Pontocrates arenarius
- Monocorophium acherusicum
- Synchelidium maculatum

==== Family Pleustidae ====
5 species

==== Family Amphilochidae ====
5–6 species, including:

- Amphilochus neapolitanus

==== Family Cyproideidae ====
1 species

==== Family Phoxocephalidae ====
8–9 species, including:

- Harpinia antennaria

==== Family Photidae ====
8 species, including:

- Gammaropsis nitida
- Gammaropsis maculata

==== Family Pontoporeiidae ====
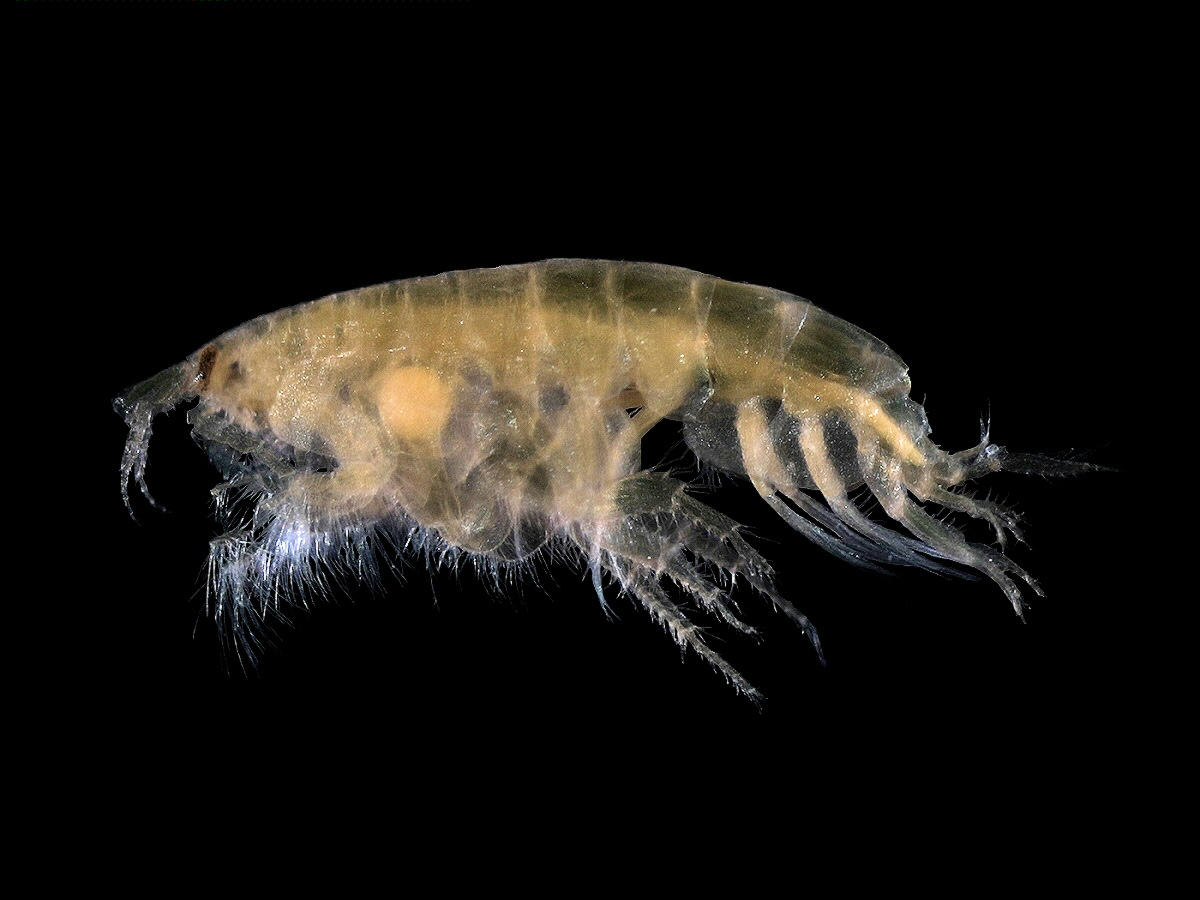
Bathyporeia elegans, an unpigmented amphipod

7 species:

- Ampelisca aequicornis
- Bathyporeia elegans
- Bathyporeia guilliamsoniana
- Bathyporeia nana
- Bathyporeia pelagica
- Bathyporeia pilosa
- Bathyporeia tenuipes

==== Family Urothoidae ====
4 species:

- Urothoe brevicornis
- Urothoe elegans
- Urothoe marina
- Urothoe poseidonis

==== Family Isaeidae ====
2 species, including:

- Microprotopus maculatus

==== Family Microprotidae ====
1 species

==== Family Cheluridae ====
1 species

==== Family Dulichiidae ====
2 species

==== Family Podoceridae ====
3 species

==== Family Phtisicidae ====
2 species

==== Family Mimonectidae ====
2? species

==== Family Scinidae ====
10 species

==== Family Lanceolidae ====
5 species

==== Family Vibiliidae ====
4 species

==== Family Cystisomatidae ====
4 species

==== Family Dairellidae ====
1 species

==== Family Phronimidae ====
1 species

==== Family Phrosinidae ====
3 species

==== Family Pronoidae ====
1species

==== Family Brachyscelidae ====
1 species

==== Family Tryphanidae ====
1 species

==== Family Platyscelidae ====
1 species

=== Order Bathynellacea ===
==== Family Bathynellidae ====
1 species:

- Antrobathynella stammeri

=== Order Cumacea (hooded shrimp, comma shrimp) ===
==== Family Bodotriidae ====
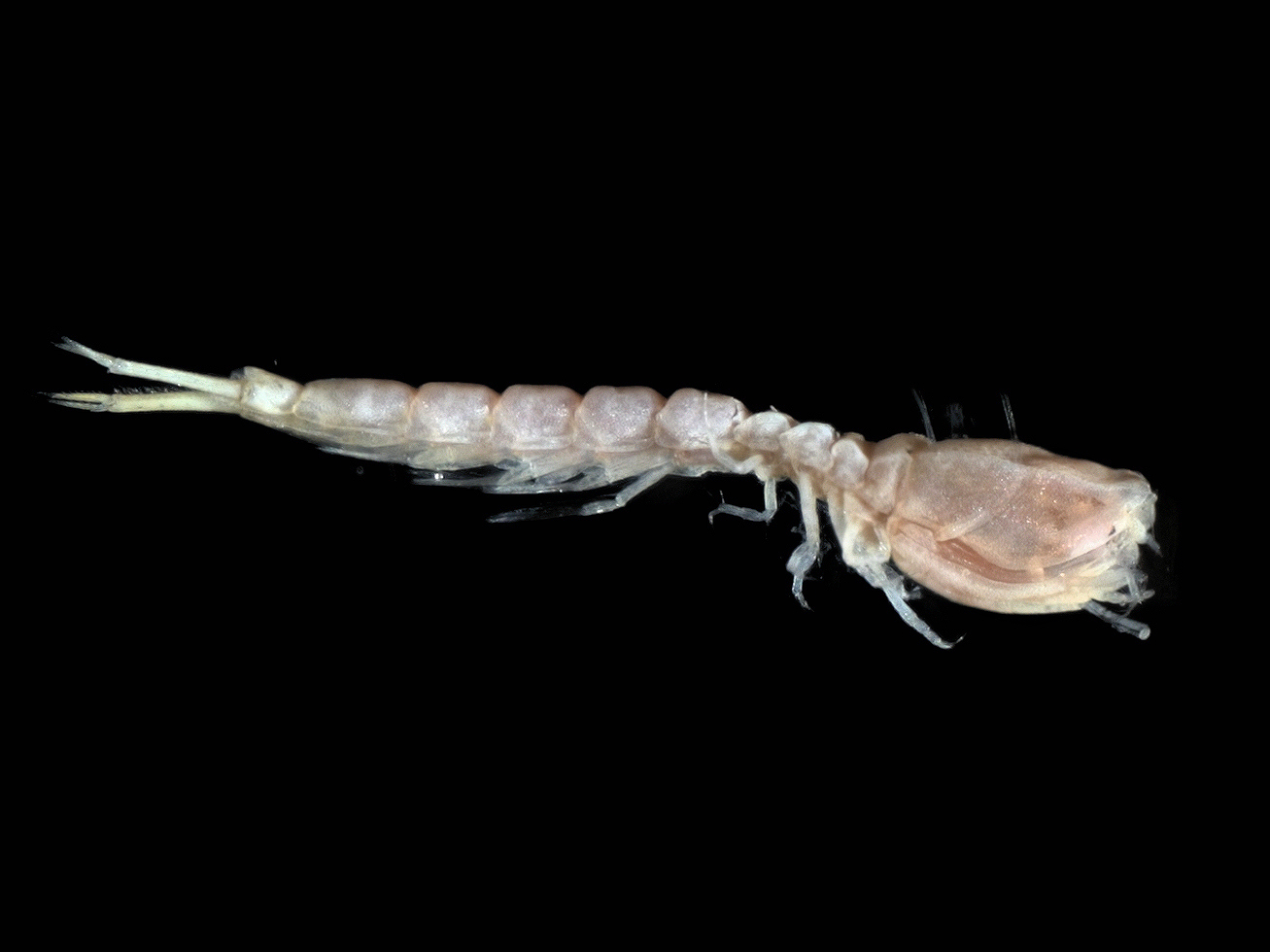
Male Bodotria scorpioides

9 species, including:

- Bodotria scorpioides
- Cumopsis fagei
- Cumopsis goodsiri
- Vaunthompsonia cristata

==== Family Diastylidae ====
12 species, including:

- Diastylis rugosa
- Diastylis bradyi
- Diastylis laevis
- Diastylis rathkei

==== Family Leuconidae ====
2 species

==== Family Nannastacidae ====
6 species

==== Family Pseudocumatidae ====
2 species:

- Pseudocuma longicorne
- Pseudocuma simile

==== Family Lampropidae ====
2 species

=== Order Euphausiacea ===
==== Family Bentheuphausiidae ====
1 species

==== Family Euphausiidae ====
13 species

=== Order Decapoda ===
==== Family Aristeidae ====
1 species

==== Family Benthesicymidae ====
2 species

==== Family Solenoceridae ====
1 species

==== Family Sergestidae ====
3 species

==== Family Stenopodidae ====
1 species

==== Family Pasiphaeidae ====
4 species

==== Family Oplophoridae ====
9 species

==== Family Bresiliidae ====
1 species

==== Family Nematocarcinidae ====
2 species

==== Family Palaemonidae ====
6 species

==== Family Processidae ====
2 species

==== Family Lithodidae ====
2 species

==== Family Chirostylidae ====
3 species

==== Family Homolidae ====
1 species

==== Family Cymonomidae ====
1 species

==== Family Glyphocrangonidae ====
1 species

==== Family Laomediidae ====
1 species

==== Family Polychelidae ====
8 species

==== Family Akanthophoreidae ====
- Akanthophoreus gracilis

==== Family Alpheidae (snapping shrimp, pistol shrimp, alpheid shrimp) ====
3 species, including:

- Alpheus macrocheles

==== Family Astacidae (freshwater crayfish) ====
1 species:

- Austropotamobius pallipes (white-clawed crayfish, Atlantic stream crayfish)

==== Family Atelecyclidae ====
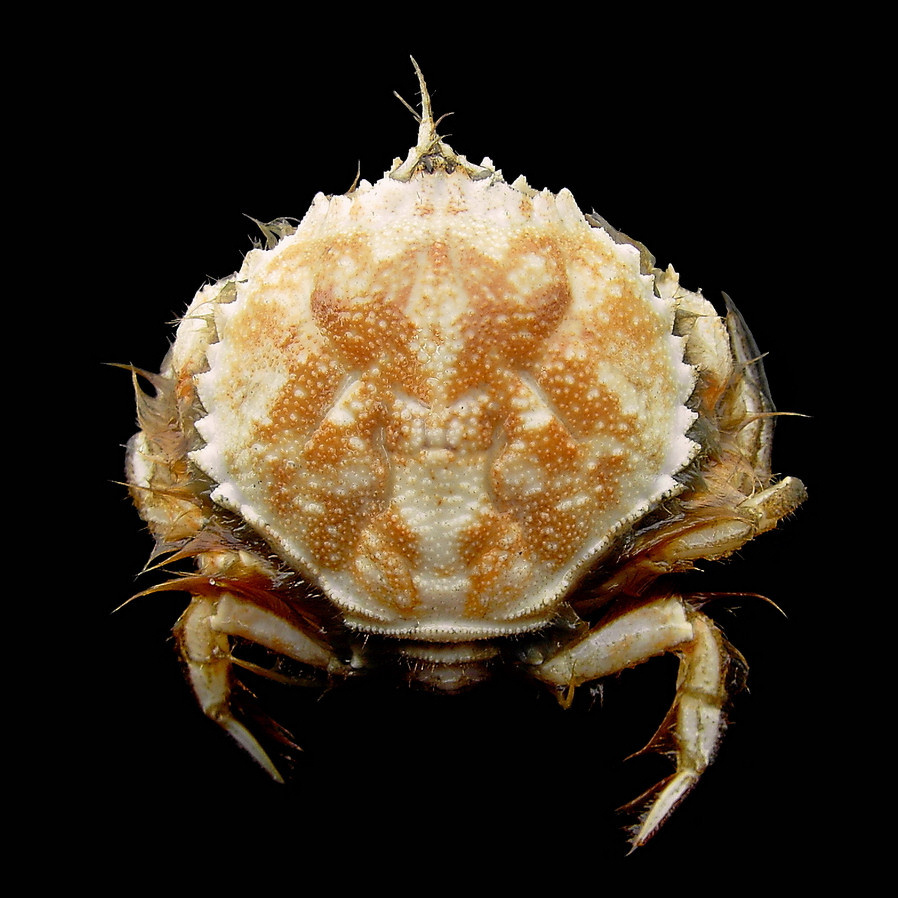
Atelecyclus rotundatus

1 species:

- Atelecyclus rotundatus (circular crab, round crab, old man's face crab)

==== Family Thiidae ====
1 species

==== Family Axiidae ====
2 species, including:

- Calocaris macandreae

==== Family Callianassidae ====
2 species, including:

- Callianassa subterranea (mud shrimp, ghost shrimp)

==== Family Calliopiidae ====
- Apherusa jurinei

==== Family Cancridae ====
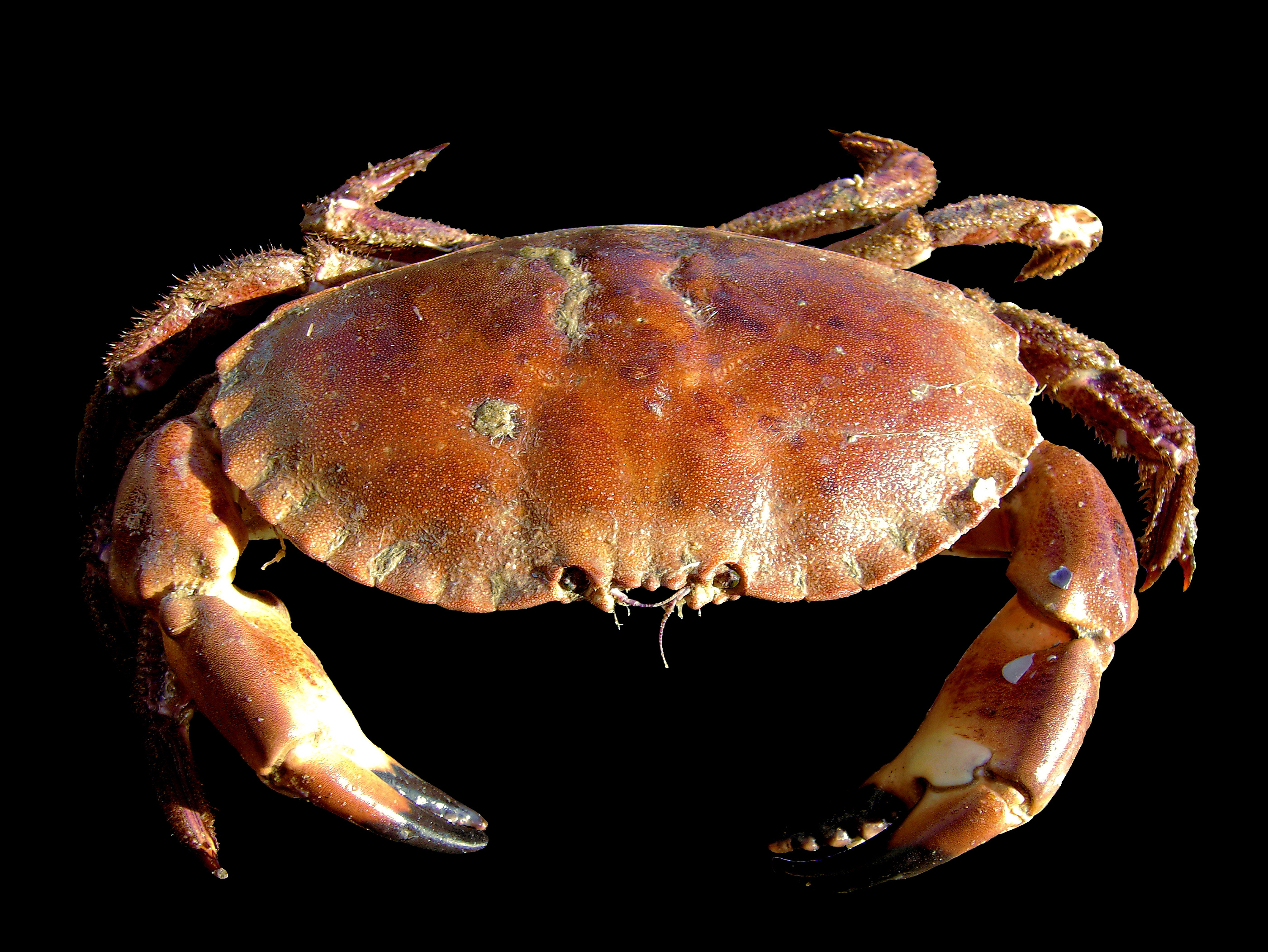
Cancer pagurus

2 species, including:

- Cancer pagurus (edible crab, brown crab)

==== Family Corystidae ====
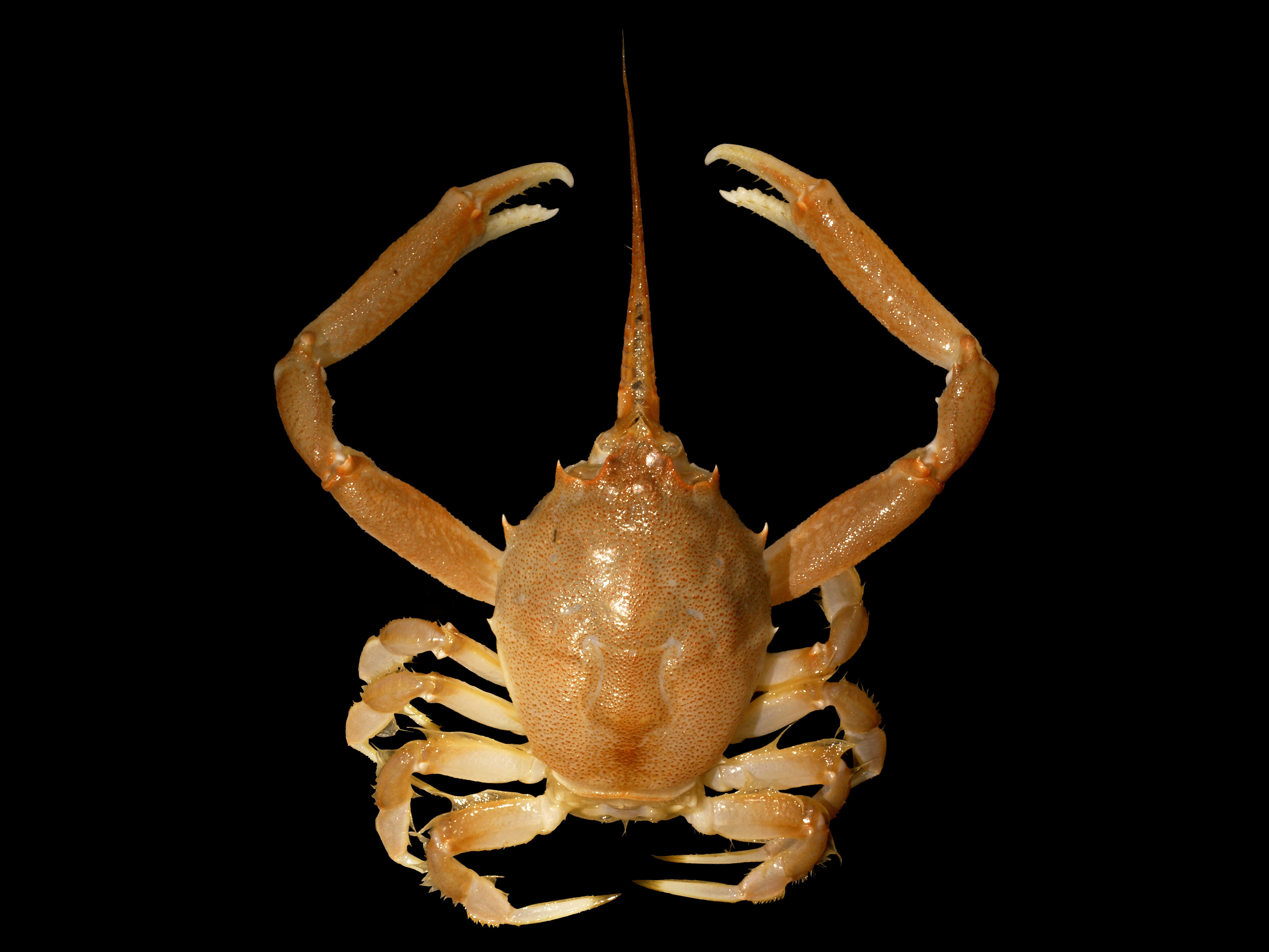
Corystes cassivelaunus

1 species:

- Corystes cassivelaunus (masked crab, helmet crab, sand crab)

==== Family Crangonidae ====
11 species, including:

- Crangon allmanni
- Crangon crangon (brown shrimp, common shrimp, bay shrimp, sand shrimp)
- Pontophilus spinosus

==== Family Diogenidae (left-handed hermit crabs) ====
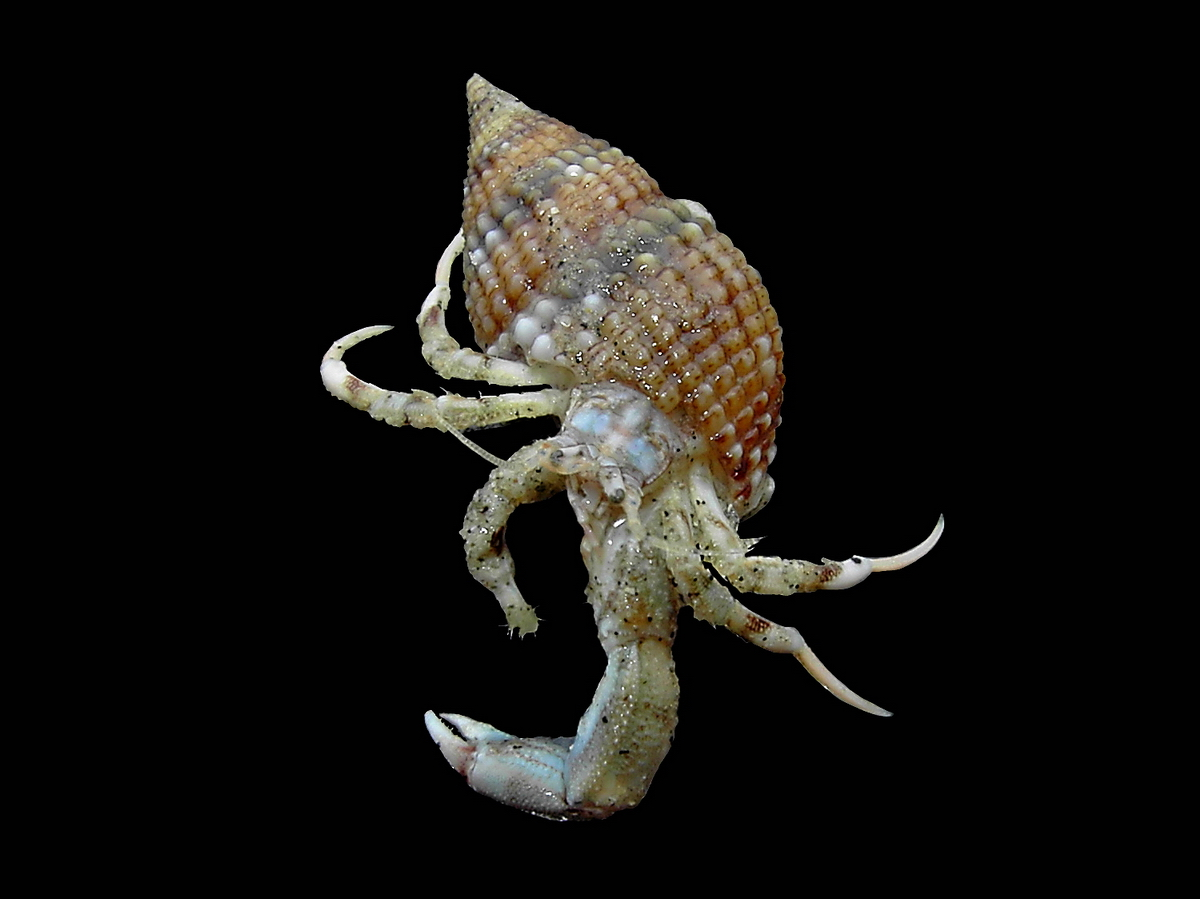
South-claw hermit crab in a Nassarius reticulatus shell

1 species:

- Diogenes pugilator (small hermit crab, south-claw hermit crab)

==== Family Epialtidae ====
- Pisa tetraodon

==== Family Galatheidae ====
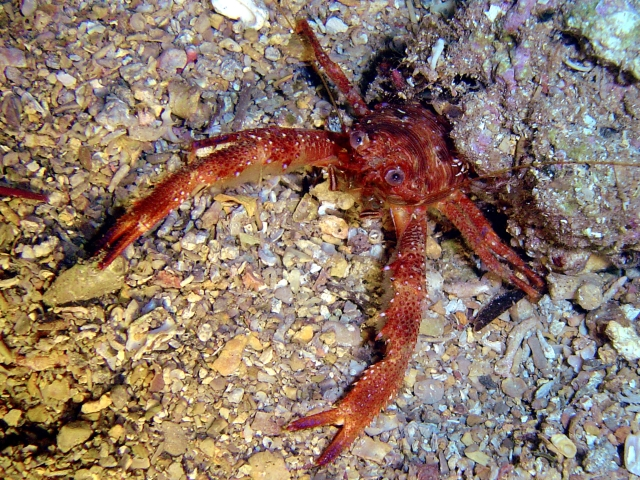
Galathea intermedia, a squat lobster

10 species, including:

- Galathea intermedia
- Galathea nexa
- Galathea squamifera (black squat lobster, Montagu's plated lobster)
- Galathea strigosa
- Munida rugosa (rugose squat lobster, plated lobster)

==== Family Goneplacidae ====
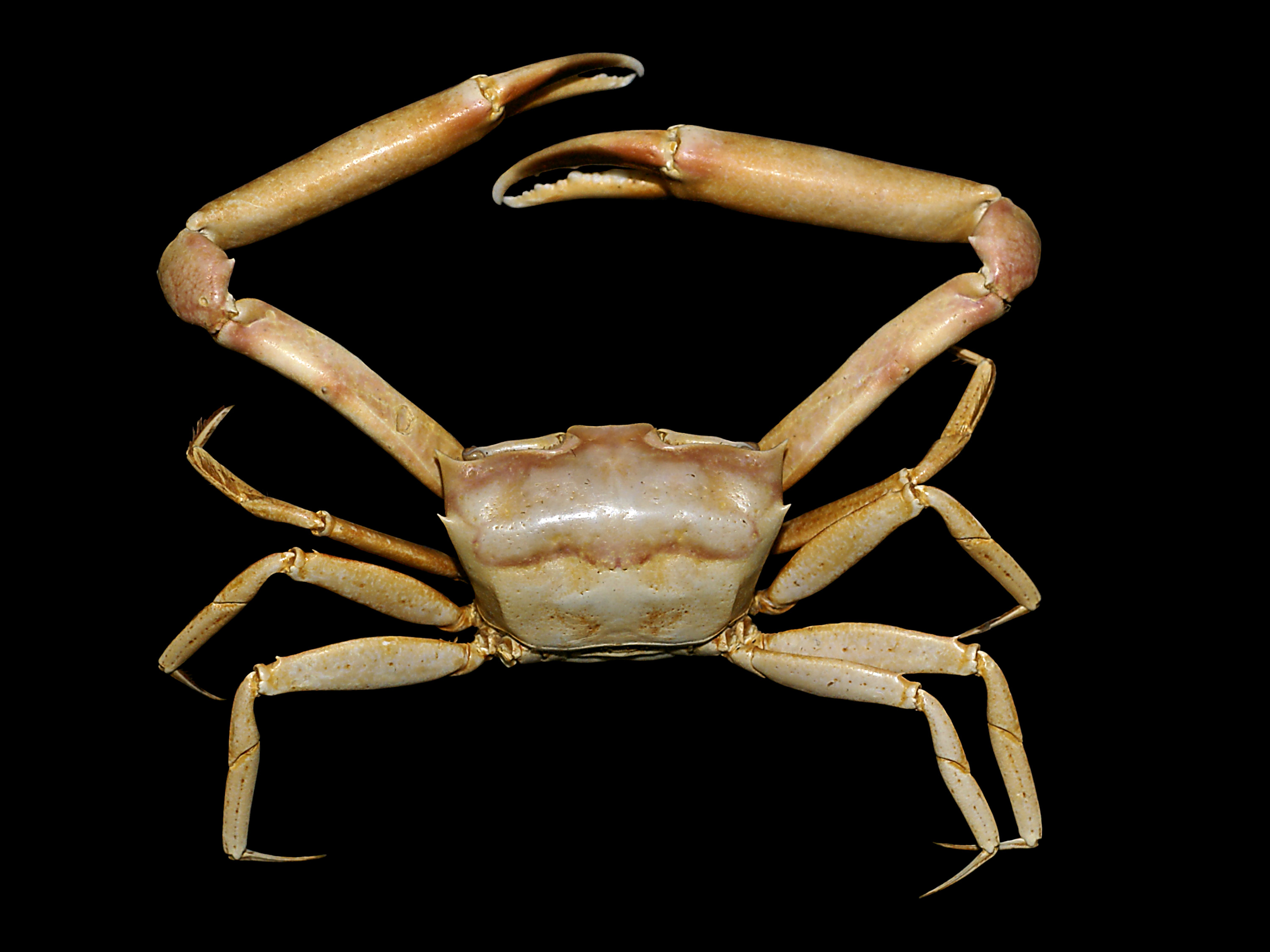
Angular crab

1 species:

- Goneplax rhomboides (angular crab)

==== Family Grapsidae (marsh crabs, shore crabs, talon crabs) ====
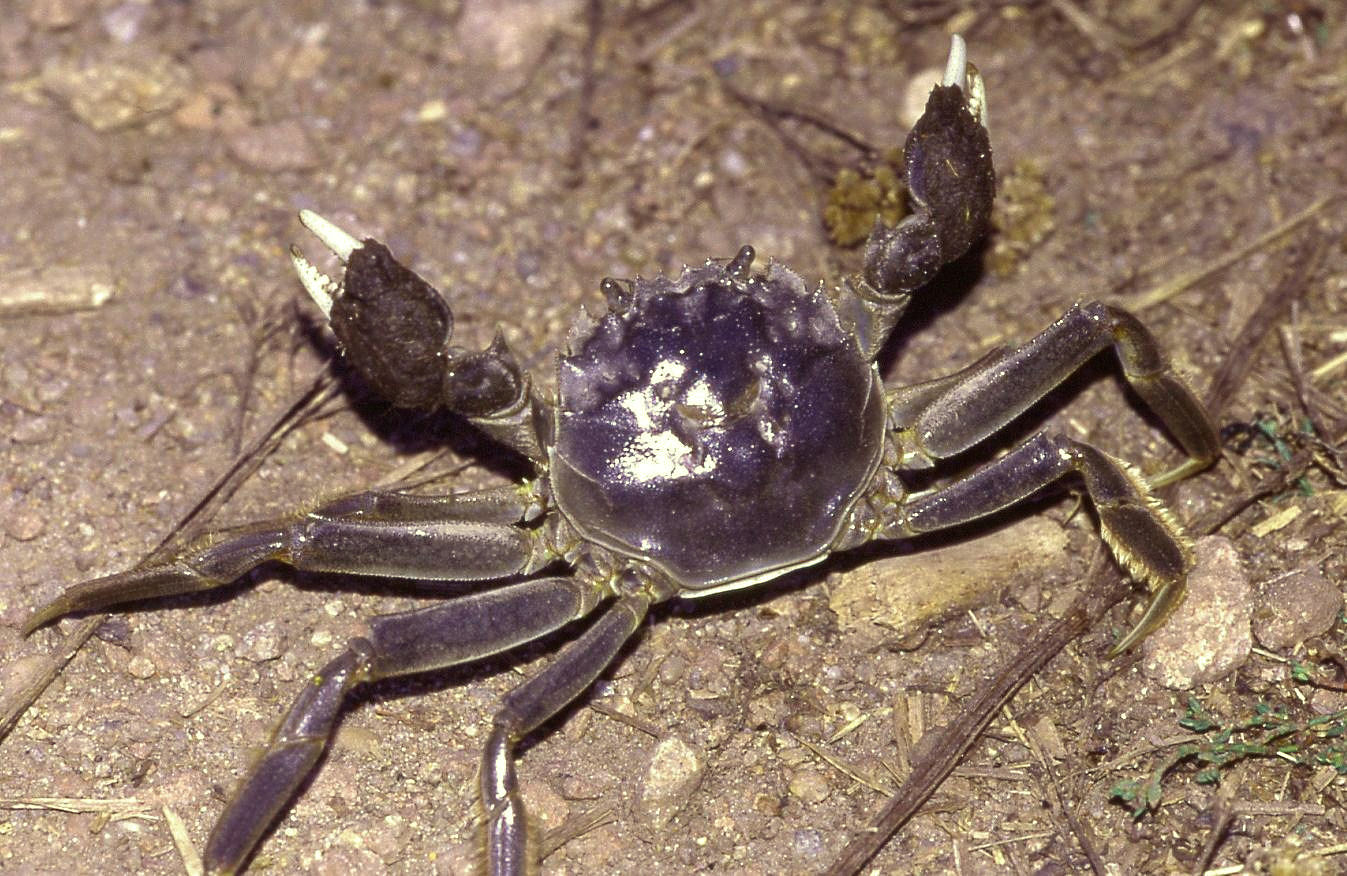
Eriocheir sinensis

2 species, including:

- Eriocheir sinensis (Chinese mitten crab, Shanghai hairy crab)

==== Family Hippolytidae (broken-back shrimp, anemone shrimp) ====
13 species, including:

- Hippolyte varians (chameleon shrimp)

==== Family Inachidae ====
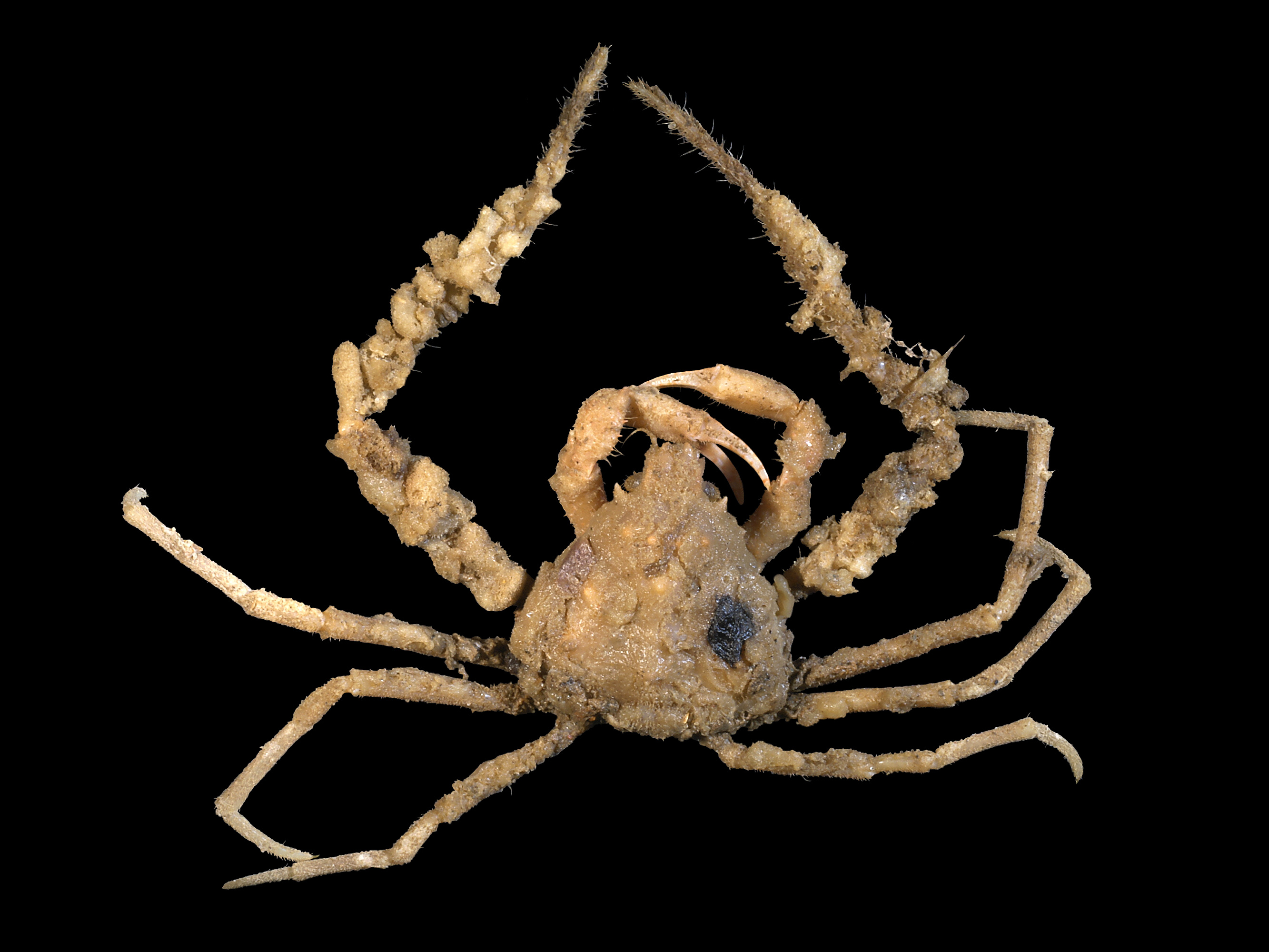
Scorpion spider crab

- Inachus dorsettensis (scorpion spider crab)
- Inachus leptochirus
- Inachus phalangium (Leach's spider crab)
- Macropodia rostrata (common spider crab, long-legged spider crab, long-legged crab)
- Macropodia tenuirostris (slender spider crab)

==== Family Leucosiidae ====
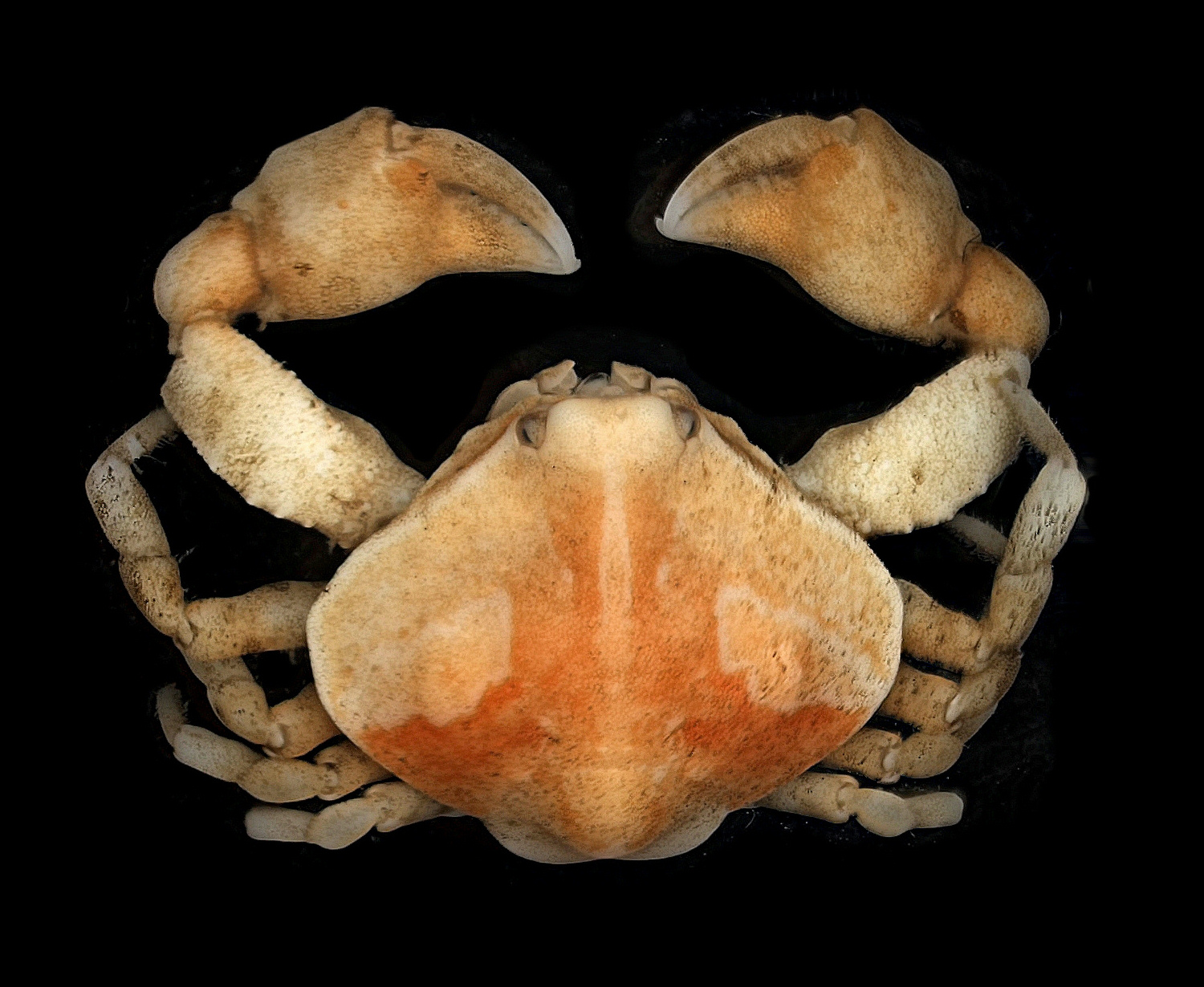
Bryer's nut crab

5 species, including:

- Ebalia tuberosa (Pennant's nut crab)
- Ebalia tumefacta (Bryer's nut crab)

==== Family Majidae ====
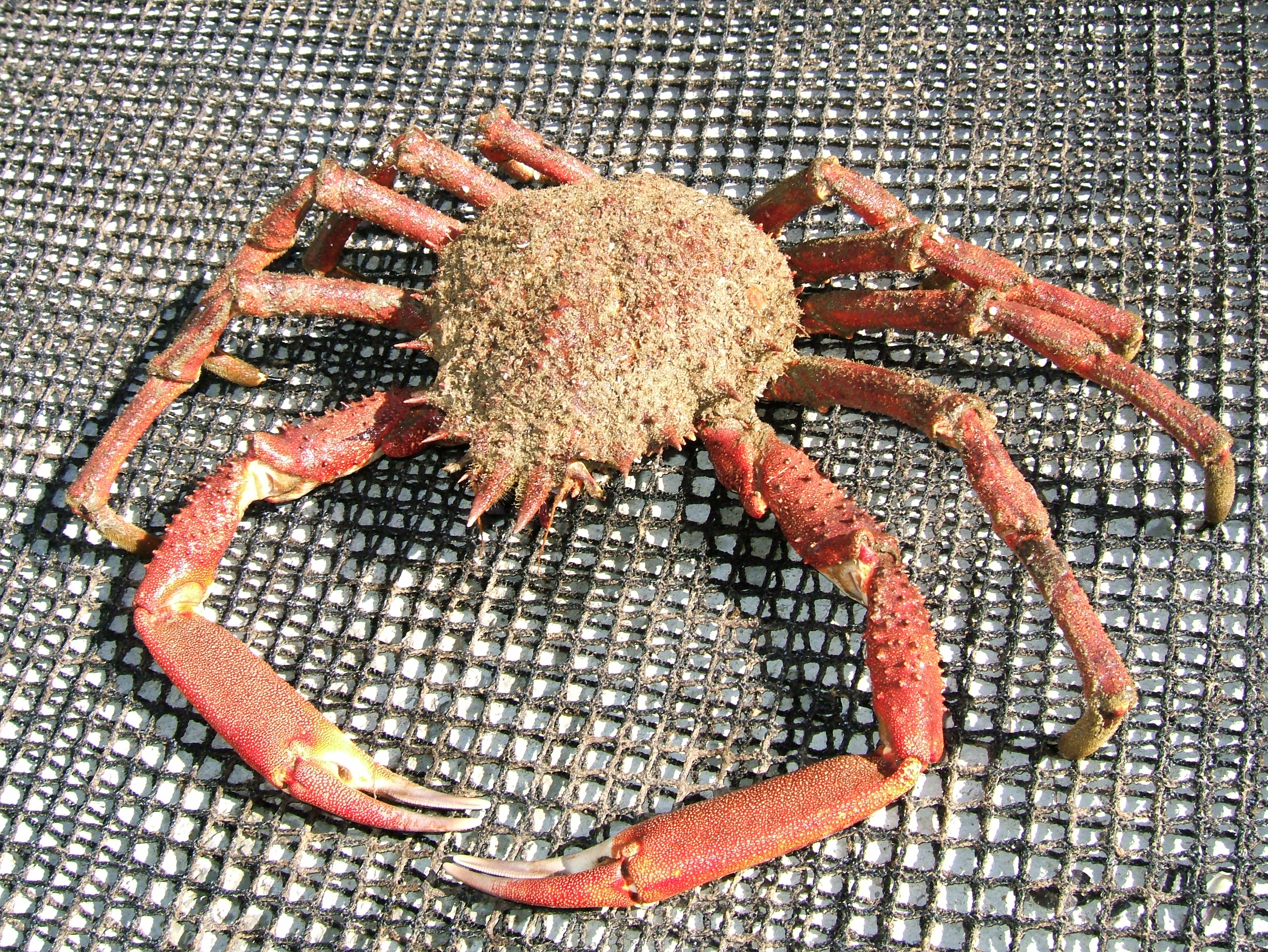
Spiny spider crab

17 species, including:

- Eurynome aspera
- Eurynome spinosa
- Maja brachydactyla
- Maja squinado (European spider crab, spiny spider crab, spinous spider crab)

==== Family Nephropidae (lobsters) ====
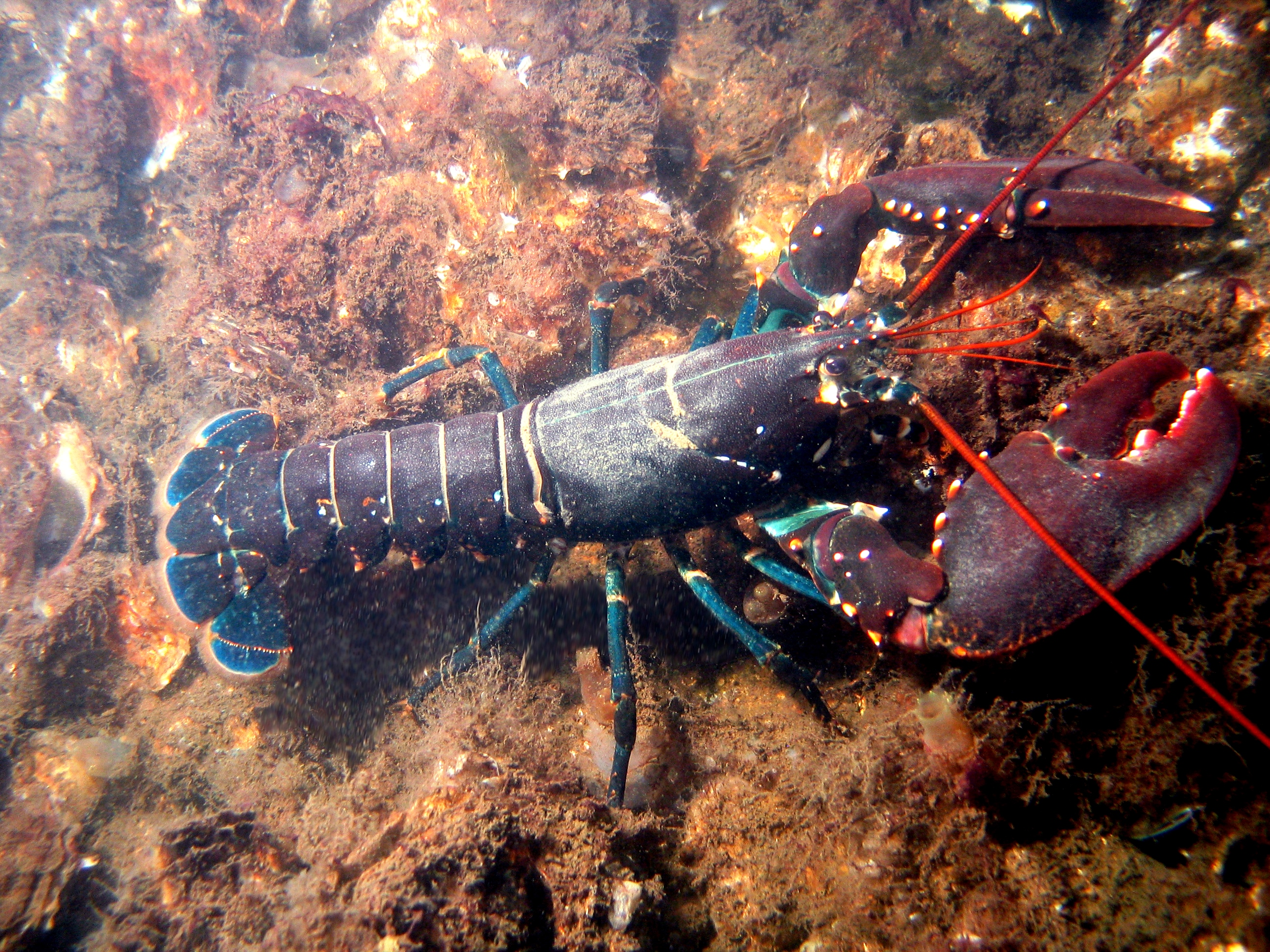
Homarus gammarus, common lobster

- Homarus gammarus (European/common lobster)

3 species, including:

- Nephrops norvegicus (Norway lobster, Dublin Bay prawn, langoustine, scampi)

==== Family Paguridae ====
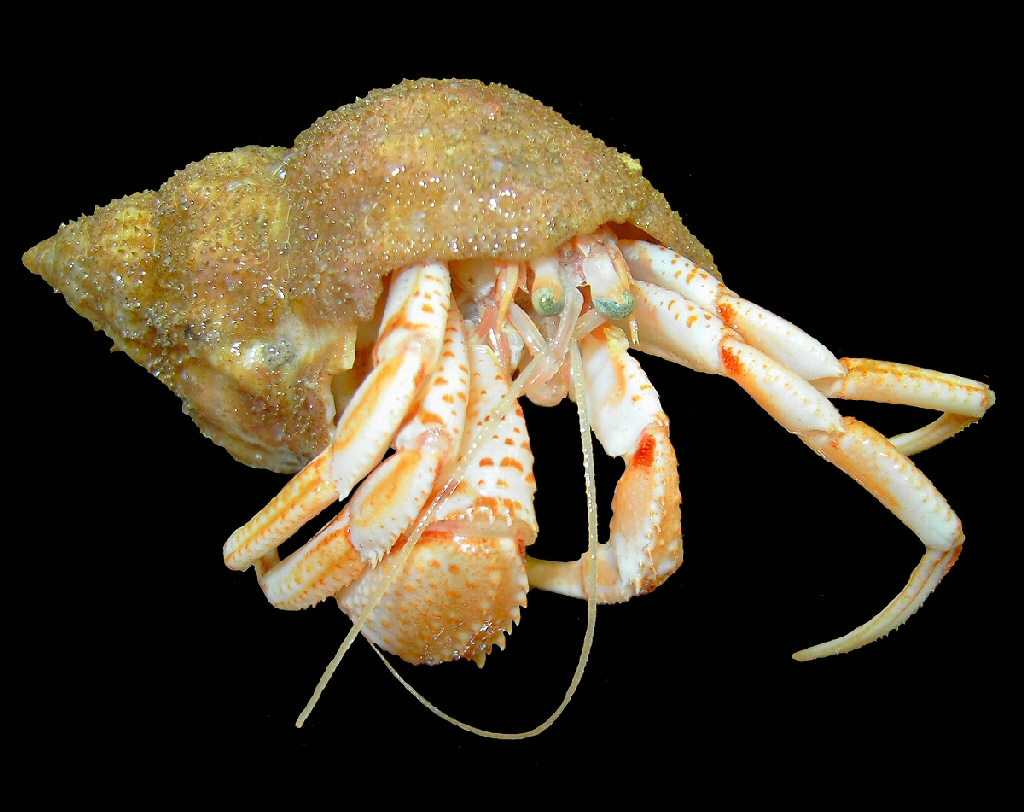
Pagurus bernhardus (common hermit crab, soldier crab)

11 species, including:

- Anapagurus chiroacanthus
- Anapagurus hyndmanni
- Anapagurus laevis
- Cestopagurus timidus
- Pagurus bernhardus (common hermit crab, soldier crab)
- Pagurus cuanensis
- Pagurus prideaux
- Pagurus pubescens

==== Family Parapaguridae ====
1 species

==== Family Oregoniidae ====
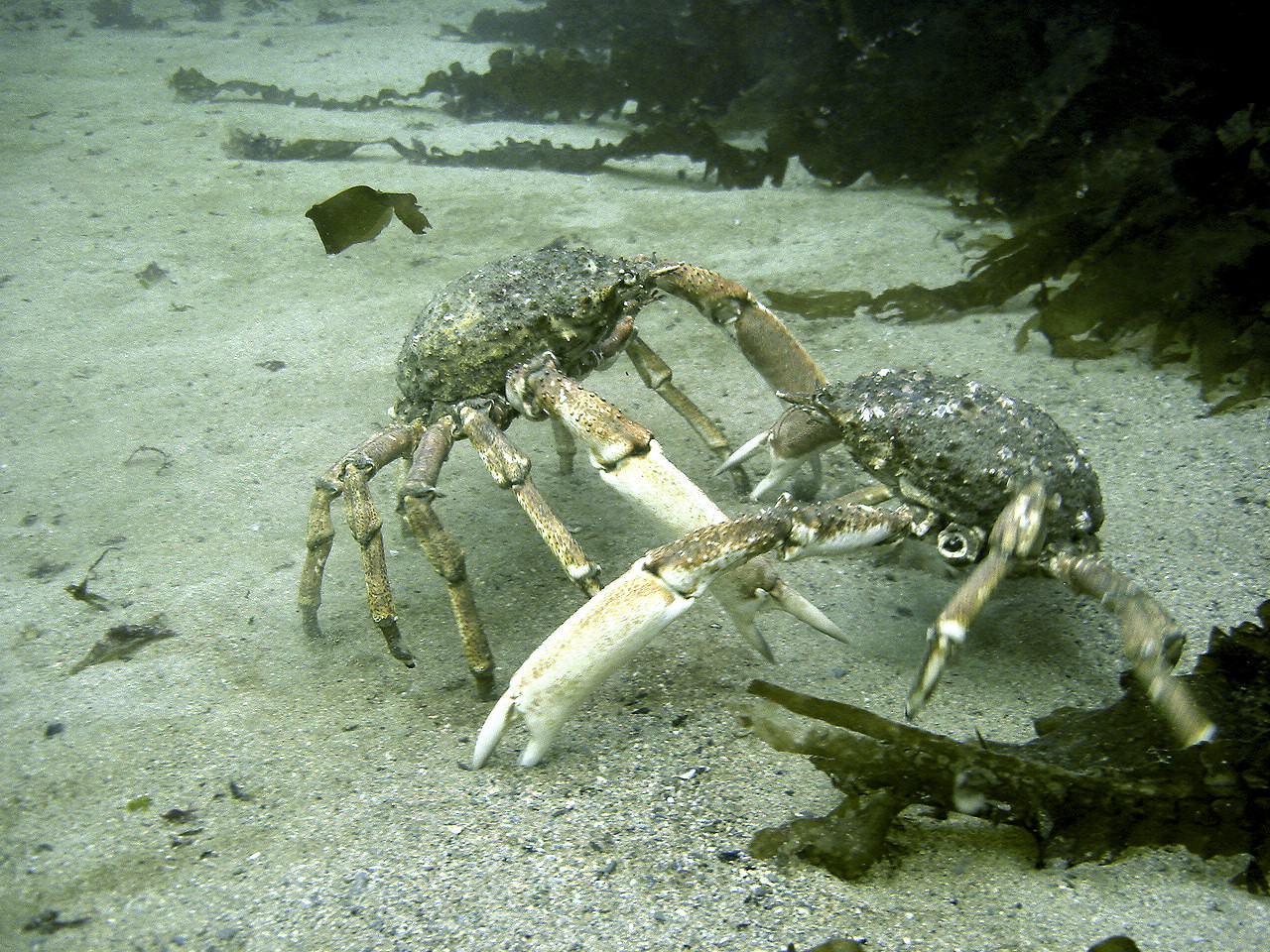
Hyas araneus

- Hyas araneus (great spider crab)
- Hyas coarctatus

==== Family Palaemonidae ====
- Palaemon elegans
- Palaemon serratus (common prawn)
- Palaemonetes varians (common ditch shrimp, river shrimp, Atlantic ditch shrimp)

==== Family Palinuridae ====
2 species, including:

- Palinurus elephas (European spiny lobster, crayfish, cray, common spiny lobster, Mediterranean lobster, red lobster)

==== Family Pandalidae ====
5 species, including:

- Pandalus montagui (pink shrimp, Aesop shrimp, Aesop prawn)

==== Family Pilumnidae ====
- Pilumnus hirtellus (bristly crab, hairy crab)

==== Family Pinnotheridae ====
2 species, including:

- Pinnotheres pisum (pea crab)

==== Family Pirimelidae ====
1 species:

- Pirimela denticulata

==== Family Porcellanidae (porcelain crab) ====
2 species:

- Pisidia longicornis (long-clawed porcelain crab)
- Porcellana platycheles (broad-clawed porcelain crab)

==== Family Portunidae (swimming crabs) ====
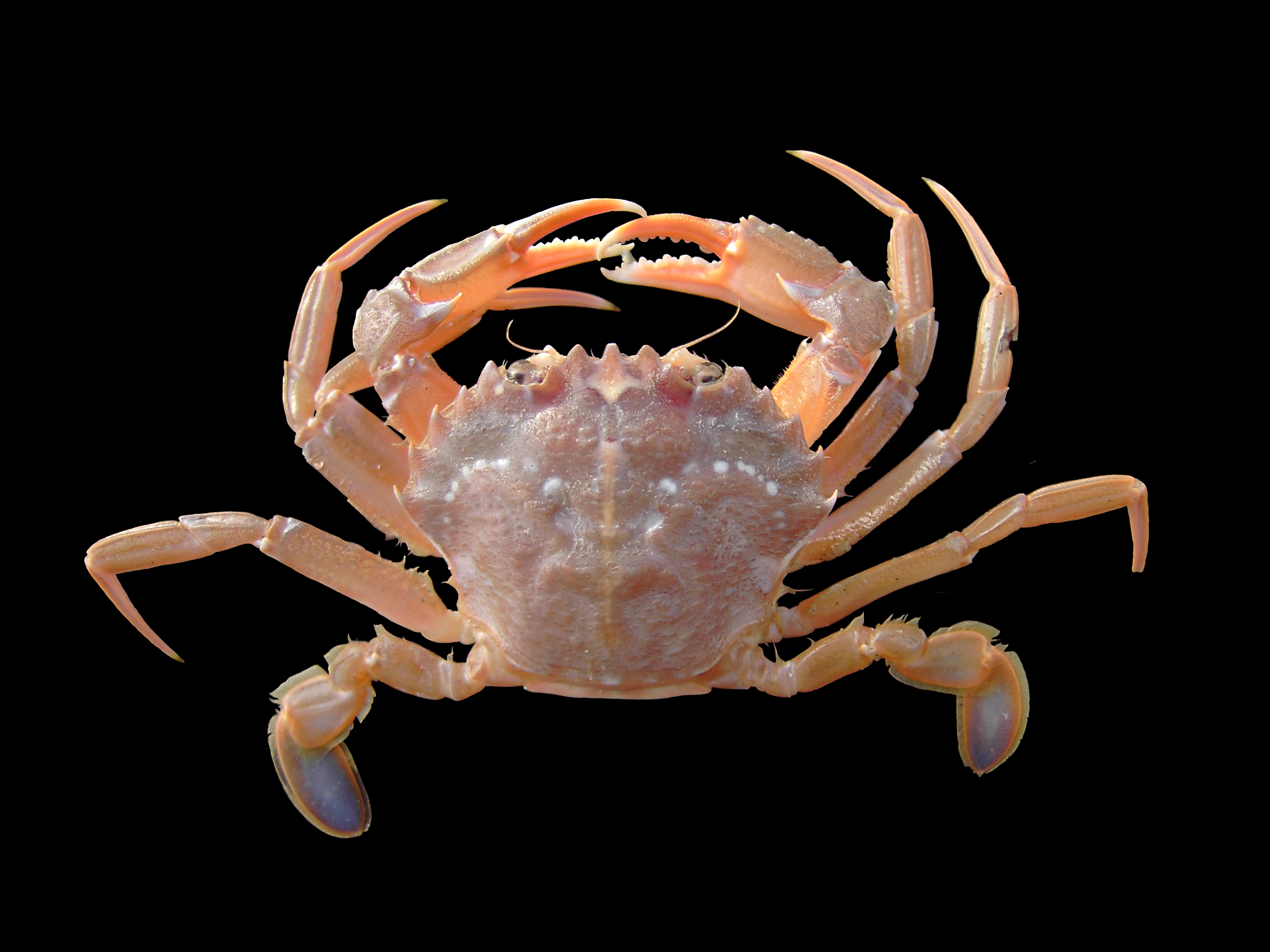
Liocarcinus depurator

14 species, including:

- Carcinus maenas (European green crab, European shore crab)
- Liocarcinus corrugatus (wrinkled swimming crab)
- Liocarcinus depurator (harbour crab, sandy swimming crab)
- Liocarcinus holsatus (flying crab)
- Liocarcinus marmoreus (marbled swimming crab)
- Liocarcinus navigator (arch-fronted swimming crab)
- Liocarcinus pusillus (dwarf swimming crab)
- Necora puber (velvet crab)
- Portumnus latipes (pennant's swimming crab)

==== Family Geryonidae ====
3 species

==== Family Thoridae (broken-back shrimp, anemone shrimp) ====
- Eualus cranchii
- Eualus occultus
- Eualus pusiolus

==== Family Upogebiidae ====
2 species:

- Upogebia deltaura
- Upogebia stellata

==== Family Xanthidae (mud crabs, pebble crabs, rubble crabs) ====
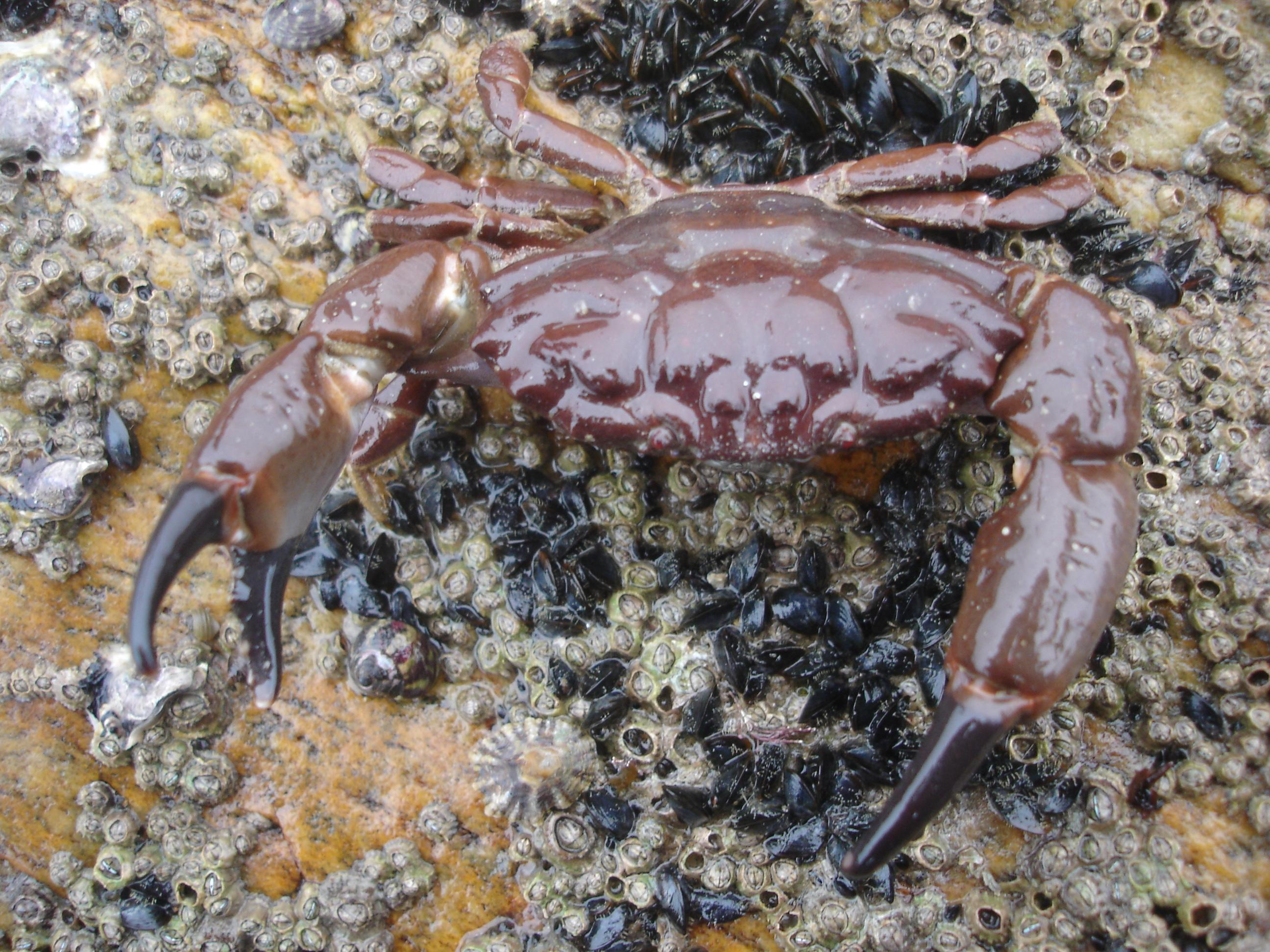
Xantho hydrophilus, a nocturnal herbivore crab.

6 species, including:

- Xantho hydrophilus
- Xantho pilipes (Risso's crab)

=== Order Isopoda ===
==== Family Anthuridae ====
- Cyathura carinata

==== Family Arcturidae ====
3 species, including:

- Astacilla longicornis

==== Family Armadillidiidae (pill bugs, roly polies, doodle bugs) ====
7 species, including:

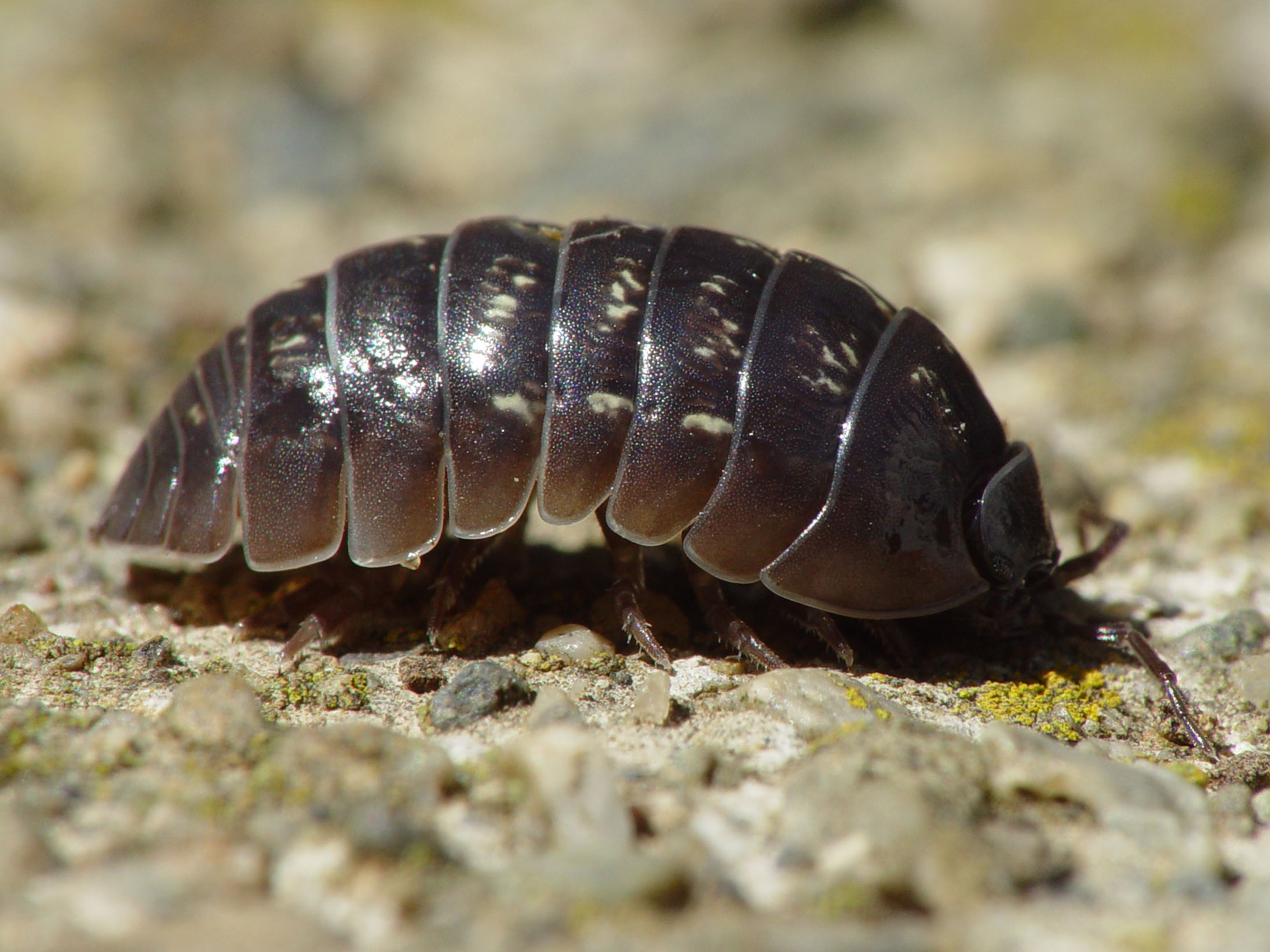
Armadillidium vulgare

- Armadillidium album
- Armadillidium vulgare (pill-bug, pill woodlouse, roly-poly, doodle bug, potato bug, carpenter)

==== Family Asellidae ====
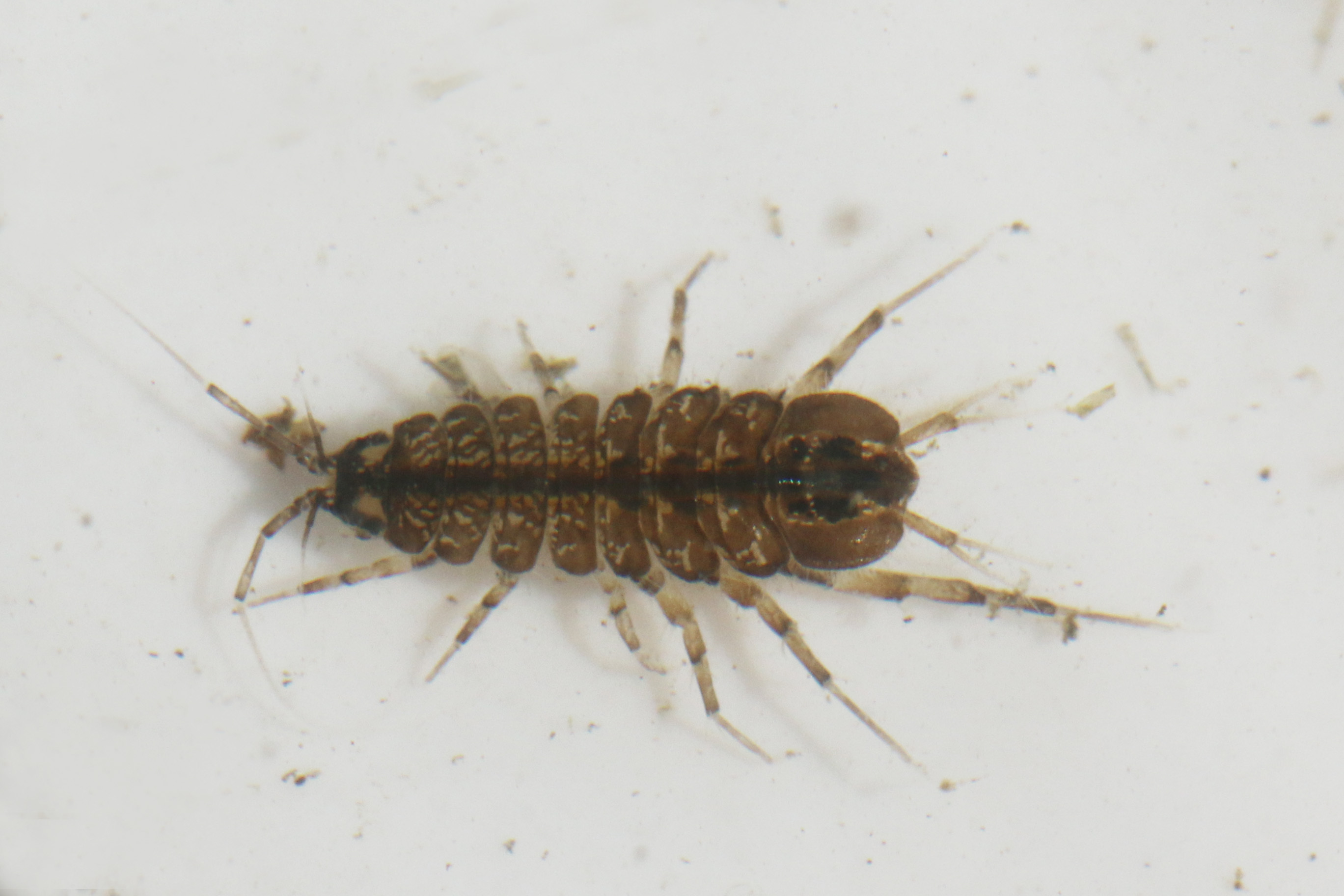
Asellus aquaticus

- Asellus aquaticus (waterlouse, aquatic sowbug, water hoglouse)
- Proasellus meridianus (one-spotted waterlouse, one-spotted water-slater)

==== Family Atylidae ====
- Nototropis swammerdamei
- Nototropis falcatus

==== Family Cirolanidae ====
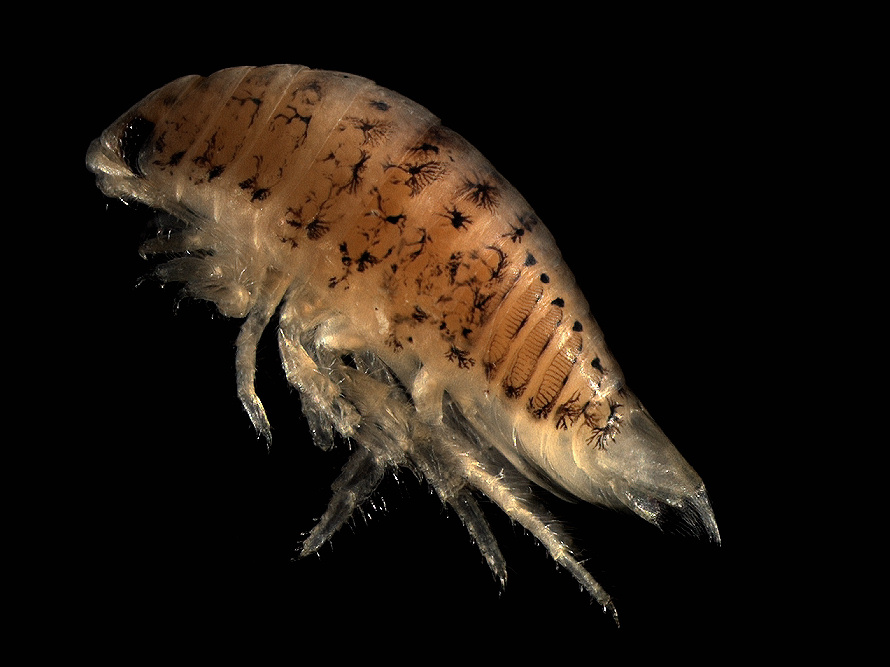
Eurydice pulchra (speckled sea louse)

10 species, including:

- Eurydice pulchra (speckled sea louse)
- Eurydice affinis

==== Family Idoteidae ====
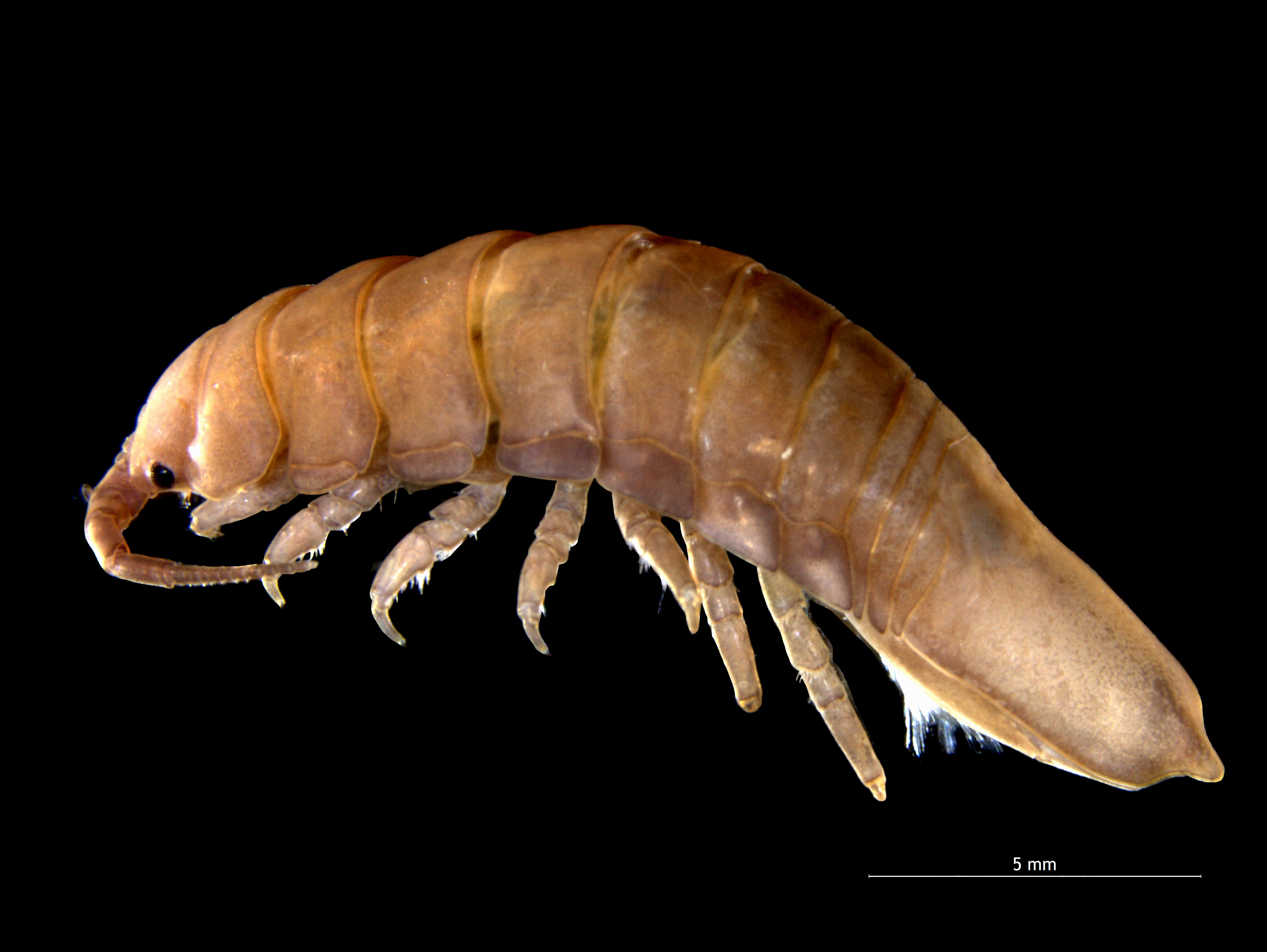
Adult Idotea granulosa

8 species, including:

- Idotea balthica
- Idotea chelipes
- Idotea granulosa
- Idotea linearis
- Idotea neglecta
- Idotea pelagica

==== Family Janiridae ====
10 species, including:

- Ianiropsis breviremis
- Jaera albifrons
- Jaera forsmani
- Jaera nordmanni
- Janira maculosa

==== Family Ligiidae ====
1 species:

- Ligia oceanica (sea slater, common sea slater, sea roach)

==== Family Limnoriidae (gribble worms) ====
2 species, including:

- Limnoria lignorum (gribble)

==== Family Munnidae ====
4 species, including:

- Munna kroyeri

==== Family Oniscidae ====
1 species:

- Oniscus asellus (common woodlouse)

==== Family Philosciidae ====
1 species:

- Philoscia muscorum (common striped woodlouse, fast woodlouse)

==== Family Porcellionidae ====
8 species, including:

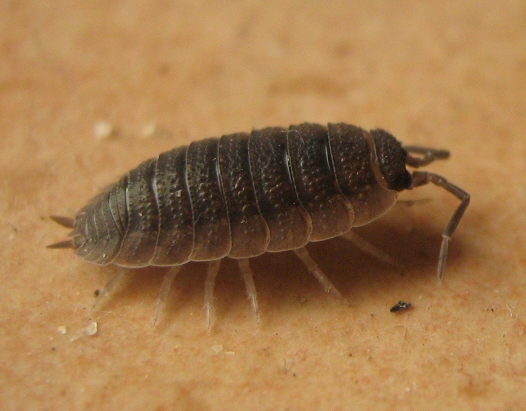
Porcellio scaber (common rough woodlouse)

- Porcellio scaber (common rough woodlouse)
- Porcellionides pruinosus

==== Family Sphaeromatidae ====
- Dynamene bidentata
- Lekanesphaera hookeri
- Lekanesphaera rugicauda (Sphaeroma rugicauda)
- Sphaeroma serratum

==== Family Trichoniscidae ====
13 species, including:

- Androniscus dentiger (rosy / pink woodlouse)
- Trichoniscus pusillus (common pygmy woodlouse)

==== Family Paramunnidae ====
2 species

==== Family Pleurogonidae ====
2 species

==== Family Thambematidae ====
1 species

==== Family Desmosomatidae ====
2 species

==== Family Eurycopidae ====
6 species

==== Family Ischnomesidae ====
2 species

==== Family Munnopsididae ====
2 species

==== Family Bopyridae ====
7 species

==== Family Hemioniscidae ====
1 species

==== Family Phryxidae ====
3 species

==== Family Styloniscidae ====
1 species

==== Family Halophilosciidae ====
1 species

==== Family Platyarthridae ====
1 species

==== Family Cylisticidae ====
1 species

==== Family Leptanthuridae ====
1 species

==== Family Ancinidae ====
1 species

==== Family Aegidae ====
6 species

==== Family Dendrotiidae ====
2 species

==== Family Haploniscidae ====
10 species

==== Family Ilyarachnidae ====
1 species

=== Order Mysida (opossum shrimps) ===
==== Family Petalophthalmidae ====
3 species

==== Family Mysidae ====
66 species, including:

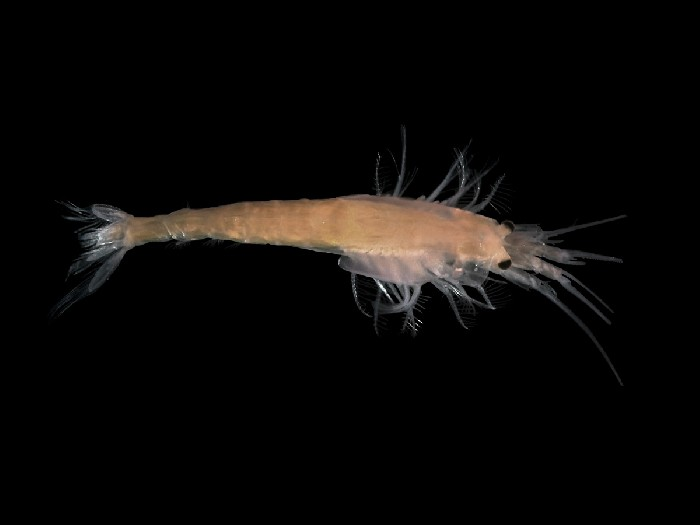
Gastrosaccus spinifer, a slender opossum shrimp.

- Gastrosaccus spinifer
- Hemimysis anomala (bloody-red mysid)
- Leptomysis gracilis
- Leptomysis lingvura
- Mysis relicta
- Neomysis integer
- Praunus flexuosus (chameleon shrimp)

=== Order Tanaidacea (tanaids) ===
- Pseudoparatanais batei (incerta sedis)

==== Family Tanaidae ====
1 species:

- Tanais dulongii

==== Family Paratanaidae ====
2 species

==== Family Anarthruridae ====
3 species

==== Family Typhlotanaidae ====
2 species

==== Family Nototanaidae ====
1species

==== Family Neotanaidae ====
2 species

==== Family Apseudidae ====
1 species

==== Family Sphyrapidae ====
2 species

== Class Maxillopoda ==
=== Order Arguloida ===
==== Family Argulidae (carp lice, fish lice) ====
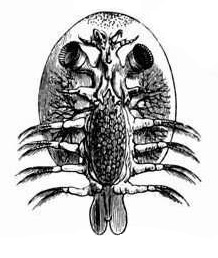
Argulus foliaceus (common fish louse)

2 species, including:

- Argulus foliaceus (common fish louse)

=== Order Misophrioida ===
==== Family Misophriidae ====
1 species

=== Order Calanoida ===
==== Family Calocalanidae ====
5 species, including:

- Calocalanus contractus

==== Family Diaptomidae ====
6 species, including:

- Diaptomus castor

==== Family Temoridae ====
4 species

==== Family Metridinidae ====
10 species

==== Family Centropagidae ====
6 species

==== Family Lucicutiidae ====
8 species

==== Family Heterorhabdidae ====
12 species

==== Family Augaptilidae ====
28 species

==== Family Arietellidae ====
6 species

==== Family Nullosetigeridae ====
2 species

==== Family Pseudocyclopidae ====
2 species

==== Family Candaciidae ====
6 species

==== Family Pontellidae ====
4 species

==== Family Parapontellidae ====
1 species

==== Family Bathypontiidae ====
1 species

==== Family Acartiidae ====
4 species

==== Family Clausocalanidae ====
5 species

==== Family Calanidae ====
7 species

==== Family Mecynoceridae ====
1 species

==== Family Eucalanidae ====
4 species

==== Family Megacalanidae ====
3 species

==== Family Paracalanidae ====
3 species

==== Family Spinocalanidae ====
7 species

==== Family Aetideidae ====
35 species

==== Family Euchaetidae ====
12 species

==== Family Phaennidae ====
12 species

==== Family Scolecitrichidae ====
22 species

==== Family Diaixidae ====
2 species

==== Family Stephidae ====
3 species

==== Family Tharybidae ====
3 species

==== Family Pseudocyclopiidae ====
1 species

=== Order Kentrogonida ===
==== Family Sacculinidae ====
1 species:

- Sacculina carcini

=== Order Apygophora ===
==== Family Trypetesidae ====
2 species

=== Order Cyclopoida ===
==== Family Enteropsidae ====
- Mychophilus roseus

==== Family Oithonidae ====
6 species

==== Family Cyclopinidae ====
8 species

==== Family Oithonidae ====
6 species

==== Family Cyclopinidae ====
8 species

==== Family Cyclopidae ====
41 species

==== Family Notodelphyidae ====
23 species

==== Family Ascidicolidae ====
12 species

=== Order Harpacticoida ===
==== Family Cylindropsyllidae ====
3 species, including:

- Cylindropsyllus laevis

==== Family Dactylopusiidae ====
- Diarthrodes roscoffensis

==== Family Harpacticidae ====
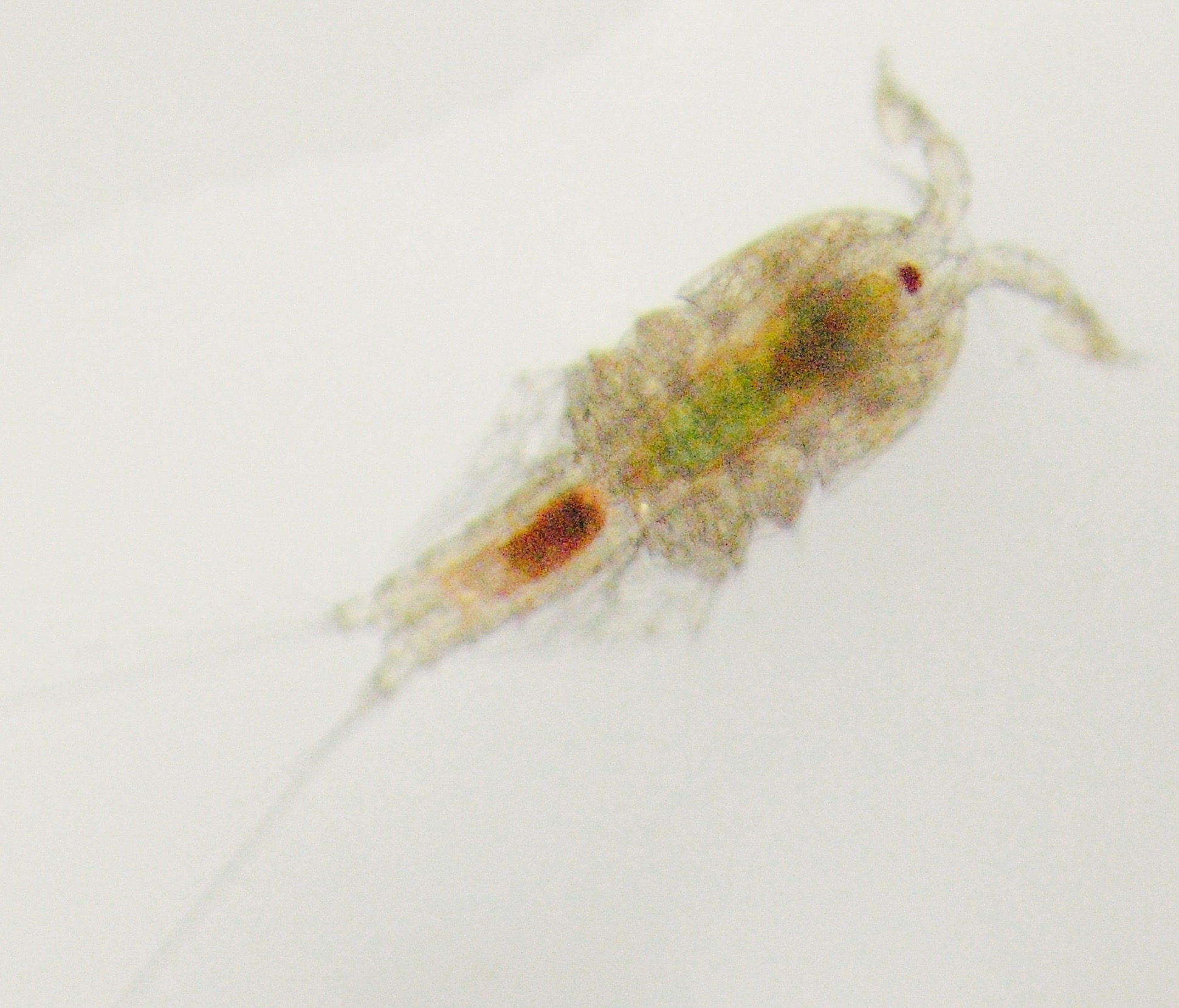
Adult male Tigriopus brevicornis (tigger-pod)

12 species, including:

- Tigriopus brevicornis (tigger-pod)

==== Family Longipediidae ====
6 species

==== Family Canuellidae ====
2 species

==== Family Aegisthidae ====
2 species

==== Family Ectinosomatidae ====
16-17 species

==== Family Darcythompsoniidae ====
2 species

==== Family Euterpinidae ====
1 species

==== Family Tachidiidae ====
5 species

==== Family Thompsonulidae ====
1 species

==== Family Tisbidae ====
18 species

==== Family Porcellidiidae ====
4-5 species

==== Family Peltidiidae ====
8 species

==== Family Clytemnestridae ====
2 species

==== Family Tegastidae ====
4 species

==== Family Thalestridae ====
34 species

==== Family Ambunguipedidae ====
1 species

==== Family Balaenophilidae ====
1 species

==== Family Parastenheliidae ====
1 species

==== Family Diosaccidae ====
38 species

==== Family Metidae ====
1 species

==== Family Ameiridae ====
23 species

==== Family Paramesochridae ====
5 species

==== Family Tetragonicipitidae ====
6 species

==== Family Canthocamptidae ====
26 species

==== Family Orthopsyllidae ====
1 species

==== Family Leptastacidae ====
2 species

==== Family Cletodidae ====
8 species

==== Family Huntemanniidae ====
1 species

==== Family Rhizothricidae ====
3 species

==== Family Argestidae ====
2 species

==== Family Laophontidae ====
36 species

==== Family Laophontopsidae ====
1 species

==== Family Normanellidae ====
2 species

==== Family Ancorabolidae ====
3 species

=== Order Mormonilloida ===
==== Family Mormonillidae ====
2 species

=== Order Poecilostomatoida ===
==== Family Ergasilidae ====
3 species

==== Family Rhynchomolgidae ====
4 species

==== Family Macrochironidae ====
1 species

==== Family Sabelliphilidae ====
4 species

==== Family Lichomolgidae ====
16-17 species

==== Family Pseudanthessiidae ====
5 species

==== Family Oncaeidae ====
14 species

==== Family Sapphirinidae ====
2 species

==== Family Clausidiidae ====
3 species

==== Family Synaptiphilidae ====
1 species

==== Family Mytilicolidae ====
3 species

==== Family Anthessiidae ====
1 species

==== Family Myicolidae ====
1 species

==== Family Corycaeidae ====
2-3 species

==== Family Bomolochidae ====
2 species

==== Family Taeniacanthidae ====
2 species

==== Family Chondracanthidae ====
6 species

==== Family Splanchnotrophidae ====
3 species

==== Family Philichthyidae ====
1 species

==== Family Lamippidae ====
2 species

==== Family Synapticolidae ====
1 species

==== Family Phyllodicolidae ====
1 species

==== Family Herpyllobiidae ====
1 species

=== Order Siphonostomatoida ===
==== Family Rataniidae ====
1 species

==== Family Asterocheridae ====
16 species

==== Family Artotrogidae ====
1 species

==== Family Dyspontiidae ====
5 species

==== Family Nanaspididae ====
1 species

==== Family Micropontiidae ====
1 species

==== Family Cancerillidae ====
2 species

==== Family Nicothoidae ====
8 species

==== Family Melinnacheridae ====
1 species

==== Family Caligidae ====
18 species, including:

- Lepeophtheirus pectoralis

==== Family Trebiidae ====
1 species

==== Family Pandaridae ====
3 species

==== Family Cecropidae ====
3 species

==== Family Dichelesthiidae ====
1species

==== Family Hatschekiidae ====
1 species

==== Family Lernanthropidae ====
1 species

==== Family Pennellidae ====
6 species

==== Family Sphyriidae ====
2 species

==== Family Lernaeopodidae ====
10-11 species

=== Order Monstrilloida ===
==== Family Monstrillidae ====
7 species

=== Order Scalpellomorpha ===
==== Family Lepadidae ====
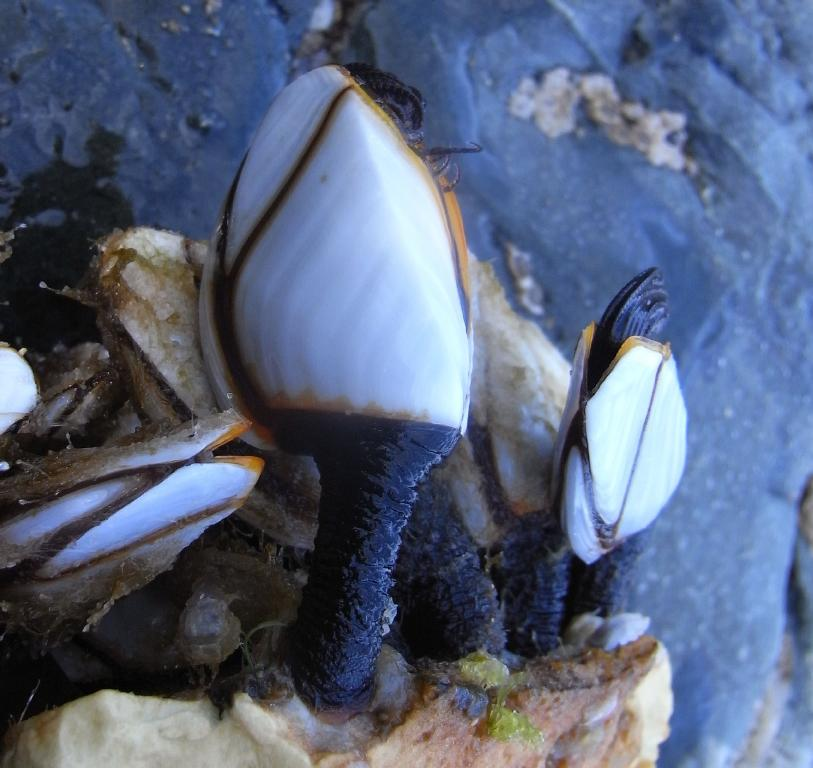
Lepas anatifera (pelagic gooseneck barnacle, smooth gooseneck barnacle)

6 species, including:

- Lepas anatifera (pelagic gooseneck barnacle, smooth gooseneck barnacle)
- Dosima fascicularis

=== Order Scalpelliformes ===
==== Family Scalpellidae ====
4 species, including:

- Scalpellum scalpellum

=== Order Sessilia (acorn barnacles) ===
==== Family Coronulidae ====
2 species

==== Family Tetraclitidae ====
1 species

==== Family Archaeobalanidae ====
3 species, including:

- Semibalanus balanoides

==== Family Balanidae ====
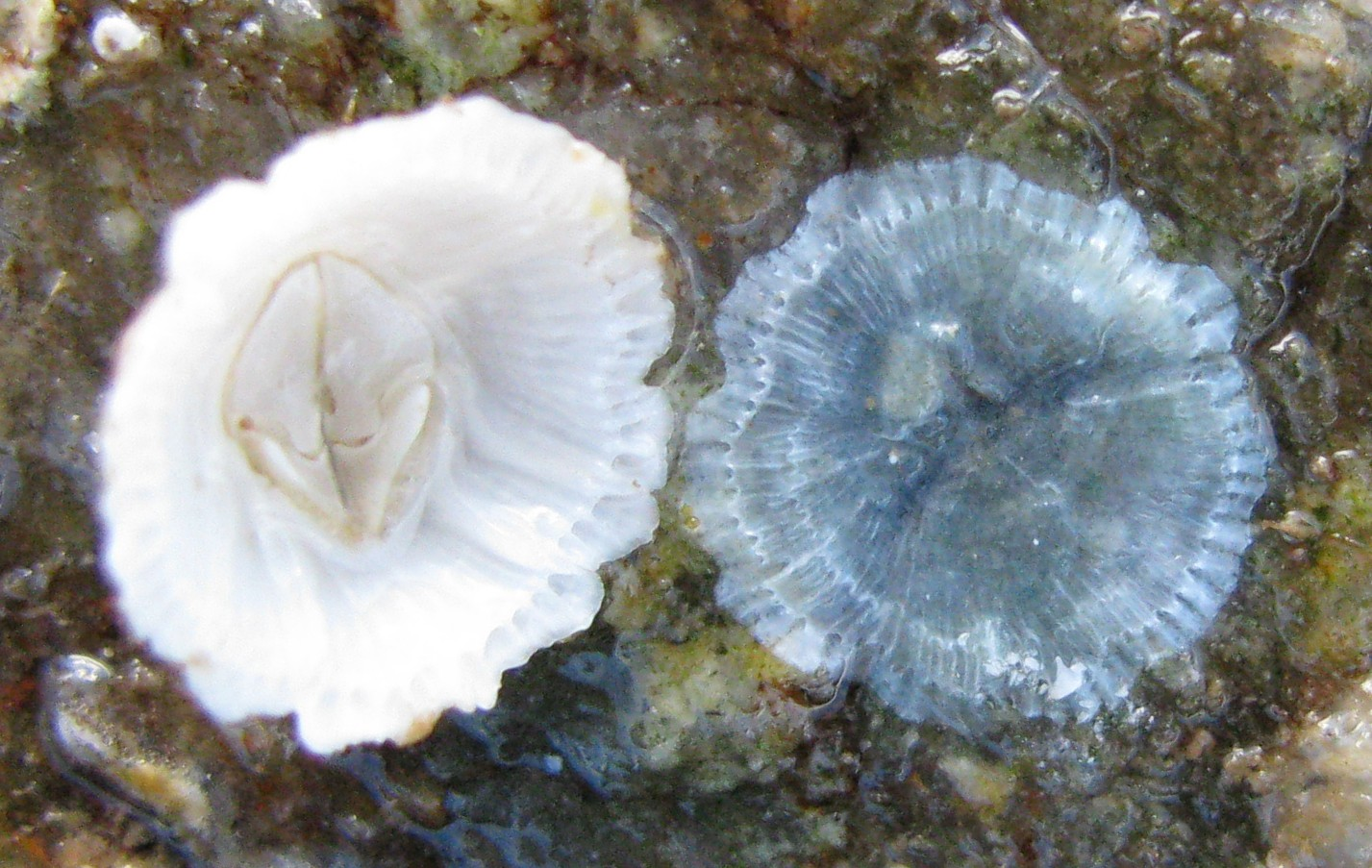
Balanus crenatus

6-7 species, including:

- Balanus balanus
- Balanus crenatus
- Balanus perforatus
- Elminius modestus

==== Family Chthamalidae ====
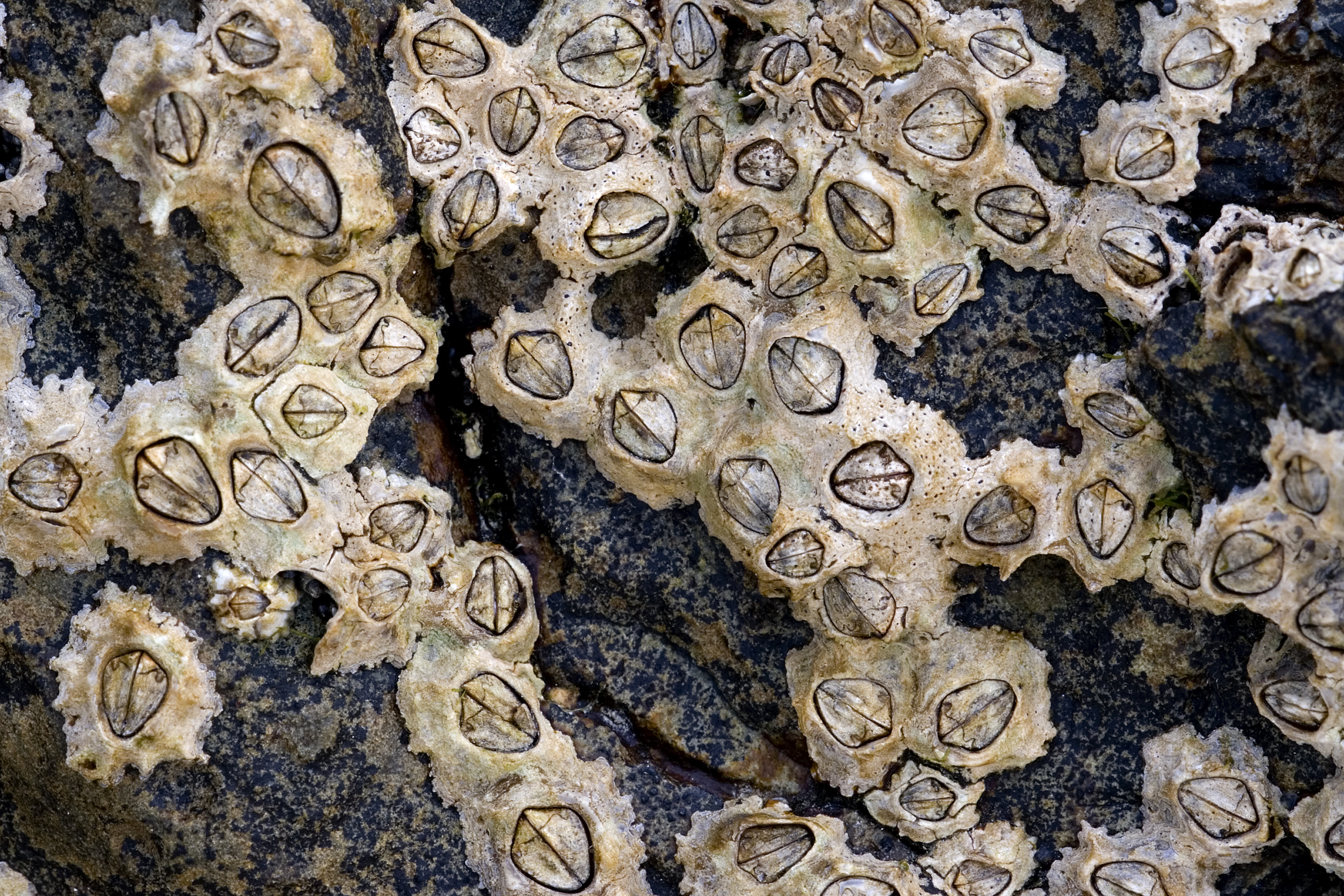
Chthamalus stellatus (Poli's stellate barnacle)

2 species:

- Chthamalus montagui (Montagu's stellate barnacle)
- Chthamalus stellatus (Poli's stellate barnacle)

==== Family Pyrgomatidae ====
1 species:

- Megatrema anglicum (Boscia anglica)

==== Family Verrucidae ====
1 species:

- Verruca stroemia

=== Order Porocephalida ===
==== Family Linguatulidae ====
1 species

=== Order Platycopioida ===
==== Family Platycopiidae ====
1species

== Class Ostracoda (seed shrimps) ==
=== Order Myodocopida ===
==== Family Cylindroleberididae ====
2 species

==== Family Philomedidae ====
1species

=== Order Halocyprida ===
==== Family Polycopidae ====
2 species

=== Order Podocopida ===
==== Family Bythocytheridae ====
2-3 species

==== Family Cytheridae ====
1species

==== Family Cytherideidae ====
4 species

==== Family Krithidae ====
1 species

==== Family Cuneocytheridae ====
1 species

==== Family Cytheruridae ====
13 species

==== Family Hemicytheridae ====
5 species

==== Family Leptocytheridae ====
4 species

==== Family Limnocytheridae ====
5 species

==== Family Loxoconchidae ====
8 species

==== Family Neocytherideidae ====
1 species

==== Family Paradoxostomatidae ====
11 species

==== Family Trachyleberididae ====
6 species

==== Family Xestoleberididae ====
2 species

==== Family Darwinulidae ====
2 species

==== Family Candonidae ====
22 species, including:

- Candona candida

==== Family Cyprididae ====
25 species, including:

- Cypris sp.

==== Family Ilyocyprididae ====
2 species

==== Family Pontocyprididae ====
3 species

== See also ==
- Crabs of the British Isles
