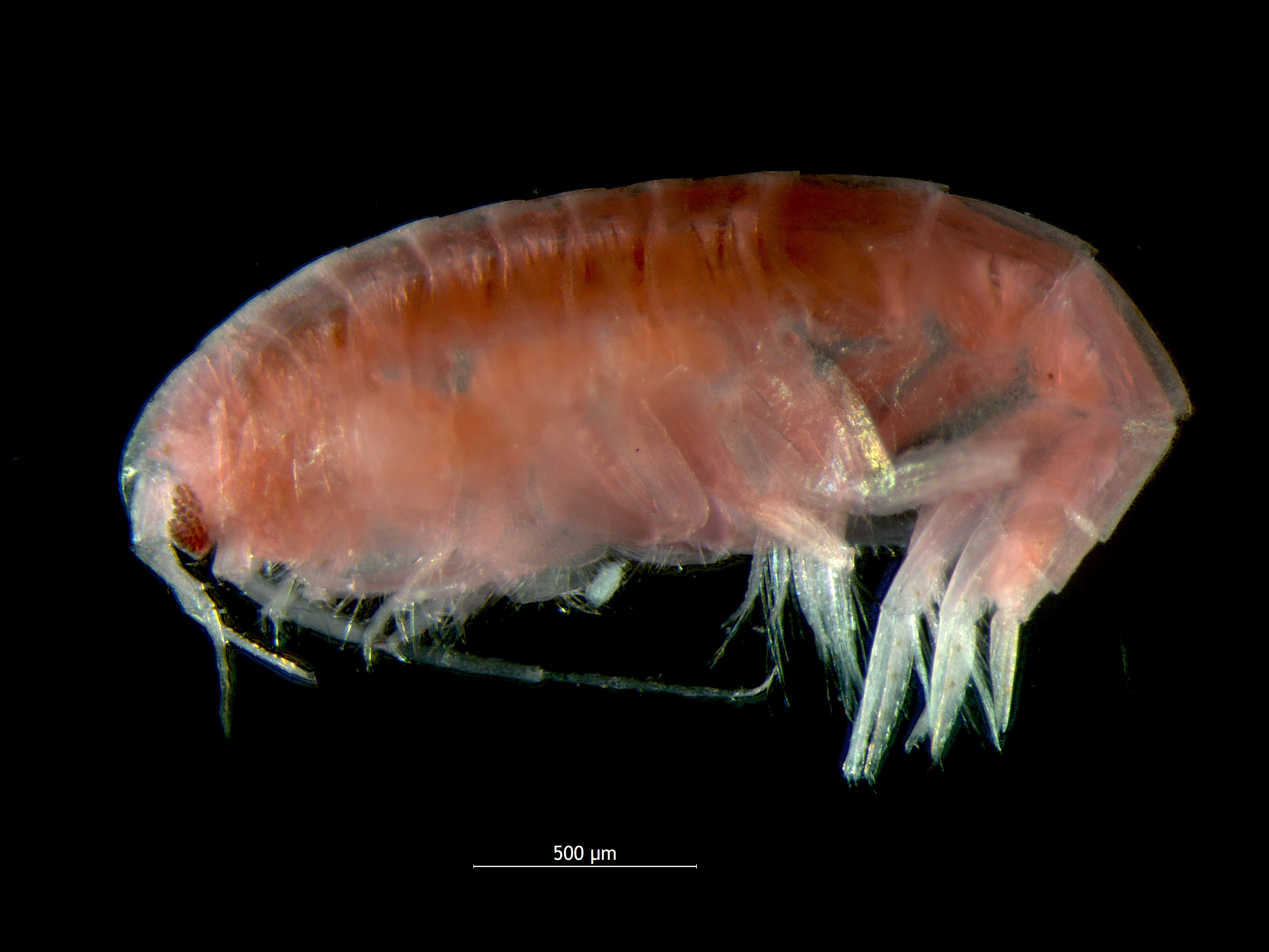
- Megaluropus agilis

Scientific classification
- Domain: Eukaryota
- Kingdom: Animalia
- Phylum: Arthropoda
- Class: Malacostraca
- Order: Amphipoda
- Superfamily: Calliopioidea
- Family: Megaluropidae

Synonyms
- Megaluropodidae

= Megaluropidae =

Family of crustaceans

Megaluropidae is a family of amphipods belonging to the order Amphipoda.

Genera:

- Aurohornellia Barnard & Karaman, 1982
- Gibberosus Thomas & Barnard, 1986
- Magnovis Alves, Lowry & Johnsson, 2020
- Megaloura Hoek, 1889
- Megaluropus Hoek, 1889
- Resupinus Thomas & Barnard, 1986
