= Colomastigidae =

Scientific classification
- Domain: Eukaryota
- Kingdom: Animalia
- Phylum: Arthropoda
- Class: Malacostraca
- Order: Amphipoda
- Superfamily: Colomastigoidea
- Family: Colomastigidae

Family of crustaceans

Colomastigidae is a family of amphipods belonging to the order Amphipoda.

Genera:

- Colomastix Grube, 1861
- Yulumara Barnard, 1972
