= Philomedidae =

Scientific classification
- Kingdom: Animalia
- Phylum: Arthropoda
- Clade: Pancrustacea
- Class: Ostracoda
- Order: Myodocopida
- Family: Philomedidae

Family of crustaceans

Philomedidae is a family of ostracods belonging to the order Myodocopida.

== Genera ==
Genera:

- Anarthron Kornicker, 1975
- Angulorostrum Kornicker, 1981
- Euphilomedes Kornicker, 1967
