= Melphidippidae =

Scientific classification
- Kingdom: Animalia
- Phylum: Arthropoda
- Clade: Pancrustacea
- Class: Malacostraca
- Order: Amphipoda
- Parvorder: Synopiidira
- Superfamily: Dexaminoidea
- Family: Melphidippidae; Stebbing, 1899

Family of crustaceans

Melphidippidae is a family of amphipods which rest upside-down and feed on particles of food suspended in the water. Three genera are recognised:

- Melphidippa Boeck, 1871
- Melphidippella Sars, 1894
- Melphisubchela Andres, 1981
