= Apygophora =

Order of crustaceans

In the past, Apygophora has been considered an order of barnacles. Research published in 2021 by Chan et al. resulted in the orders Apygophora and Pygophora being classified as families under the order Lithoglyptida.
