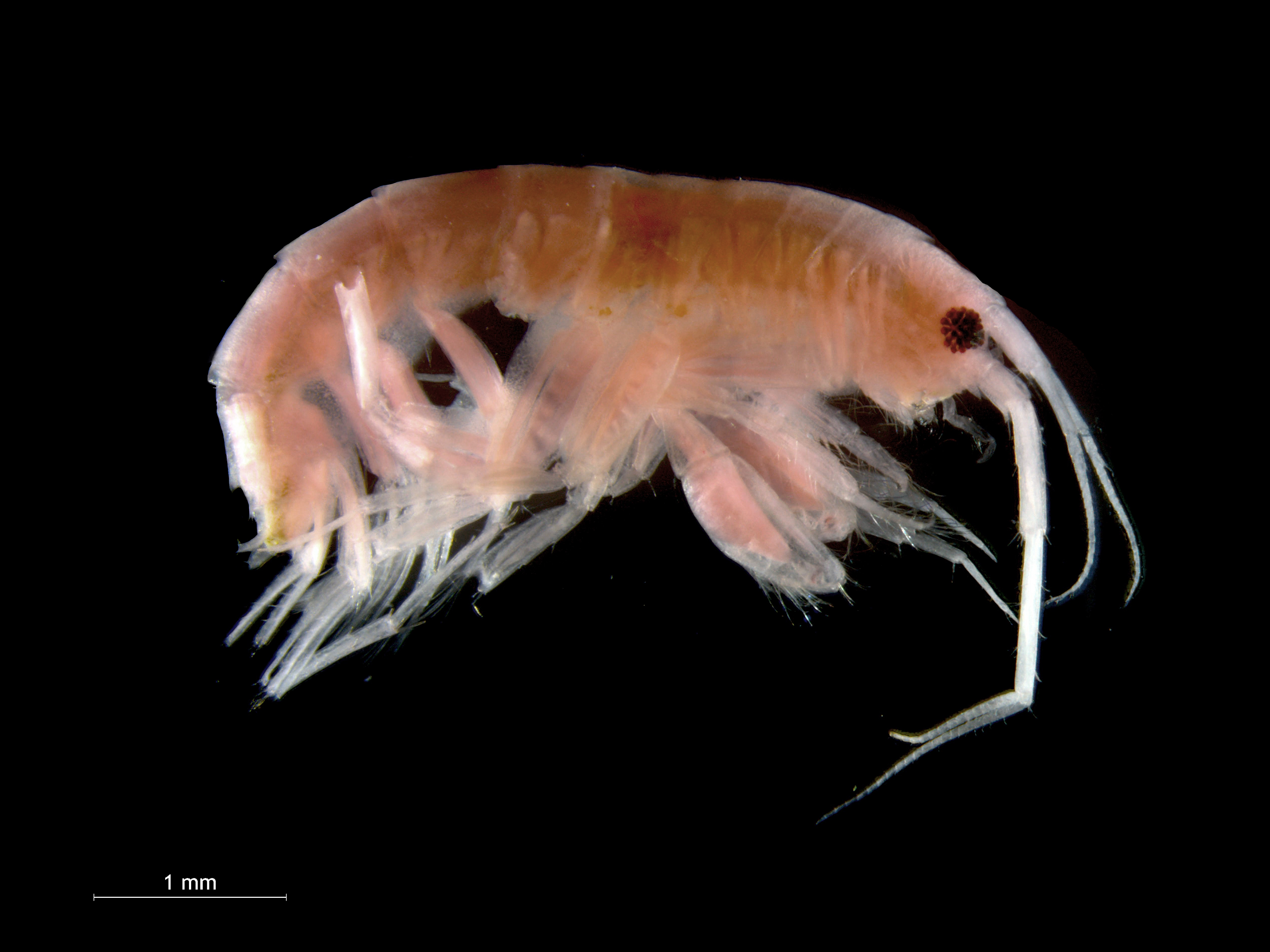
- Cheirocratus sundevalli

Scientific classification
- Domain: Eukaryota
- Kingdom: Animalia
- Phylum: Arthropoda
- Class: Malacostraca
- Order: Amphipoda
- Superfamily: Calliopioidea
- Family: Cheirocratidae

= Cheirocratidae =

Family of crustaceans

Cheirocratidae is a family of amphipods belonging to the order Amphipoda.

Genera:

- Casco Shoemaker, 1930
- Cheirocarpochela Ren & Andres, 2006
- Cheirocratella Stephensen, 1940
- Cheirocratus Norman, 1867
- Degocheirocratus Karaman, 1985
- Incratella Barnard & Drummond, 1981
- Prosocratus Barnard & Drummond, 1982
