= Sabelliphilidae =

Scientific classification
- Domain: Eukaryota
- Kingdom: Animalia
- Phylum: Arthropoda
- Class: Copepoda
- Order: Cyclopoida
- Suborder: Ergasilida
- Family: Sabelliphilidae

Family of crustaceans

Sabelliphilidae is a family of copepods belonging to the order Cyclopoida.

Genera:

- Acaenomolgus Humes & Stock, 1972
- Eupolymniphilus Humes & Boxshall, 1996
- Myxomolgoides Humes, 1975
- Myxomolgus Humes & Stock, 1972
- Nasomolgus Sewell, 1949
- Phoronicola Boxshall & Humes, 1988
- Sabelliphilus Sars, 1862
- Serpuliphilus Humes & Stock, 1972
- Terebelliphilus Kim, 2001
