= Argissidae =

Scientific classification
- Kingdom: Animalia
- Phylum: Arthropoda
- Class: Malacostraca
- Order: Amphipoda
- Superfamily: Synopioidea
- Family: Argissidae

Family of crustaceans

Argissidae is a family of amphipods belonging to the order Amphipoda.

Genera:

- Argissa Boeck, 1871
- Chimaeropsis Meinert, 1890
