= Anthessiidae =

Scientific classification
- Domain: Eukaryota
- Kingdom: Animalia
- Phylum: Arthropoda
- Class: Copepoda
- Order: Cyclopoida
- Suborder: Ergasilida
- Family: Anthessiidae

Family of crustaceans

Anthessiidae is a family of cyclopoid copepods in the order Cyclopoida. There are about 7 genera and more than 60 described species in Anthessiidae.

== Genera ==
These seven genera belong to the family Anthessiidae:

- Anthessius Della Valle, 1880
- Discanthessius Kim I.H., 2009
- Katanthessius Stock, 1960
- Neanthessius Izawa, 1976
- Panaietis Stebbing, 1900
- Pseudomolgus
- Rhinomolgus Sars G.O., 1918
