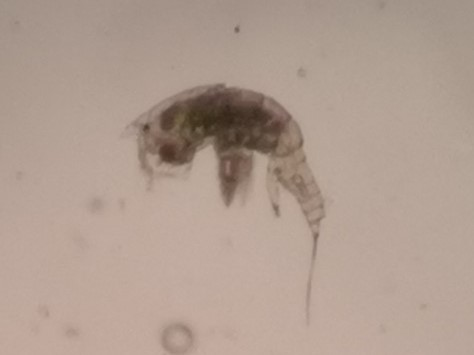
- Euterpina acutifrons

Scientific classification
- Kingdom: Animalia
- Phylum: Arthropoda
- Class: Copepoda
- Order: Harpacticoida
- Family: Tachidiidae; G.O. Sars, 1909

Synonyms
- Euterpinidae

= Tachidiidae =

Family of crustaceans

Tachidiidae is a family of copepods belonging to the order Harpacticoida.

Genera:

- Cithadius Bowman, 1972
- Euterpina Norman, 1903
- Geeopsis Huys, 1996
- Microarthridion Lang, 1944
- Neotachidius Shen & Tai, 1963
- Pseudoneotachidius Nazari, Mirshamsi, Sari, Aliabadian & Gomez, 2020
- Sinotachidius Huys, Ohtsuka, Conroy-Dalton & Kikuchi, 2005
- Tachidius Lilljeborg, 1853
