= Synaptiphilidae =

Scientific classification
- Domain: Eukaryota
- Kingdom: Animalia
- Phylum: Arthropoda
- Class: Copepoda
- Order: Cyclopoida
- Suborder: Ergasilida
- Family: Synaptiphilidae

Family of crustaceans

Synaptiphilidae is a family of cyclopoid copepods in the order Cyclopoida. There are at least 3 genera and about 10 described species in Synaptiphilidae.

== Genera ==
These three genera belong to the family Synaptiphilidae:

- Enterophilus Kim I.H., 2000
- Presynaptiphilus Bocquet & Stock, 1960
- Synaptiphilus Canu & Cuénot, 1892
