= Cuneocytheridae =

Scientific classification
- Kingdom: Animalia
- Phylum: Arthropoda
- Clade: Pancrustacea
- Class: Ostracoda
- Order: Podocopida
- Family: Cuneocytheridae

Family of crustaceans

Cuneocytheridae is a family of ostracods belonging to the order Podocopida.

Genera:

- Cuneocythere Lienenklaus, 1894
- Dicrorygma Poag, 1962
