= Acartia tranteri =

Scientific classification
- Kingdom: Animalia
- Phylum: Arthropoda
- Class: Copepoda
- Order: Calanoida
- Family: Acartiidae
- Genus: Acartia
- Species: A. tranteri

Binomial name
- Acartia tranteri Bradford, 1976

Species of crustacean

Acartia tranteri is a species of marine copepod belonging to the family Acartiidae. The species was first described in 1976 by Janet Bradford.

This Australian species is related to the New Zealand species A. ensifera, A. jilletti and A. simplex but can be distinguished by the lack of any ventral prominence posterior to the genital opening in the female and the presence of posterior spines on the metasome (body segment) of the male. It is found off the southern coast of Australia (New South Wales).
