= Acartia teclae =

Scientific classification
- Domain: Eukaryota
- Kingdom: Animalia
- Phylum: Arthropoda
- Class: Copepoda
- Order: Calanoida
- Family: Acartiidae
- Genus: Acartia
- Species: A. teclae

Binomial name
- Acartia teclae Bradford, 1976

Species of crustacean

Acartia teclae is a species of copepod belonging to the family Acartiidae. This species was discovered when specimens previously identified as Acartia clausi were examined and found to belong to a separate species. This species appears to have a similar range (Mediterranean Sea and north eastern Atlantic Ocean as far north as Great Britain) to, and occupies similar brackish estuarine habitats as, Acartia lefevreae but differs in the absence of spines on the dorsal part of the posterior body segment (metasome).
