= Acartia omorii =

Scientific classification
- Domain: Eukaryota
- Kingdom: Animalia
- Phylum: Arthropoda
- Class: Copepoda
- Order: Calanoida
- Family: Acartiidae
- Genus: Acartia
- Species: A. omorii

Binomial name
- Acartia omorii Bradford, 1976

Species of crustacean

Acartia omorii is a species of marine copepod belonging to the family Acartiidae. This species was discovered when specimens previously identified as Acartia clausi were examined and found to belong to a separate species. This species is found around the coast of Japan. It is similar to A. clausi but lacks the prominent spines on the dorsal part of the posterior body segment (metasome).
