= Acartia hudsonica =

Scientific classification
- Kingdom: Animalia
- Phylum: Arthropoda
- Clade: Pancrustacea
- Class: Copepoda
- Order: Calanoida
- Family: Acartiidae
- Genus: Acartia
- Species: A. hudsonica

Binomial name
- Acartia hudsonica Pinhey, 1926

Species of crustacean

Acartia hudsonica is a species of marine copepod belonging to the family Acartiidae. Acartia hudsonica is a coastal, cold water species that can be found along the northwest Atlantic coast.

Acartia hudsonica was originally described as a subspecies of Acartia clausi, but subsequent research concluded it is sufficiently distinct to warrant specific status. It is found in shallow coastal habitats along both the Atlantic and Pacific coasts of northern North America

== Anatomy ==
Acartia hudsonica anatomy is different for the nauplius (larval) stage than the copepodite (juvenile) and adult stages. A nauplius has a head and a tail, but no defined abdominal region. After six stages of molting, a nauplius develops into a copepodite, which now has a distinct abdomen. After molting six more times, a copepodite will have grown enough to be considered an adult copepod.

An adult copepod is usually under 1 millimeter long. Their bodies are split up into three sections: 1. the head (cephalosome); 2. the abdomen (metasome); and 3. the tail (urosome). The head has a single eye in the center with two pairs of antenna, one long and one short. Copepods also have five pairs of swimming legs that are located on the underside of the abdomen.

An anatomical characteristic that distinguish A. hudsonica from other Acartia species is blue lines on the anterior of their abdomen.

== Distribution ==
=== Geographic ===
Like all Acartia species, A. hudsonica is found primarily in estuaries. They can be found in open coastal waters, as well, but they are less abundant in those regions. A. hudsonica is not found farther south than Chesapeake Bay, and is not found farther north than Labrador/Newfoundland.

=== Temporal ===
A trait specific to A. hudsonica is that they are only found in cool water. North of Cape Cod, the water stays cold enough throughout the year for A. hudsonica to be abundant year-round. However, south of Cape Cod A. hudsonica is only found in the winter and spring months. This is because the summer and fall months are too warm for the A. hudsonica population to thrive. In response to this temperature increase A. hudsonica has developed a genetic mutation that allows it to lay two different types of eggs: subitaneous and diapause eggs. Subitaneous eggs hatch immediately. Diapause eggs are laid when water temperatures rise above 16˚C and then hatch when exposed to temperatures more typical of winter and spring.

Climate change is affecting the temporal distribution of A. hudsonica in southern estuaries. Temperatures in the winter have warmed more than temperatures in the spring, changing the biologically important threshold for winter-spring species in estuaries. This is causing a population pulse of A. hudsonica to occur about 1.5-2.0 months earlier.

=== Genetic ===
It has been found that there are geography distinct subgroups of A. hudsonica along the west Atlantic coast. The first group is from Rhode Island/South Coast Massachusetts/Cape Cod to southern Maine, the second group is from southern Connecticut/Long Island Sound, and the third group is from southern New Jersey. It is thought that the genetic isolation of these subgroups of A. hudsonica has developed because of its geographical isolation in estuaries. This isolation might also contribute to the higher genetic variation within A. hudsonica than other Acartia species.

== Ecological significance ==
Zooplankton play an important role in the pelagic food web by linking primary producers to higher trophic levels, and significantly contribute to biogeochemical cycles. A. hudsonica will feed on a variety of organisms including phytoplankton, heterotrophic protists and mixotrophic protists. The energy gained from their prey then gets transferred up the food web when the A. hudsonica themselves are eaten. A literature review done in 1984 showed that copepods, including Acartia, are the most frequently recorded prey of larval fish. And subsequent research has continued to document this trend.

With the changing climate the size of estuarine copepods, such as A. hudsonica, are decreasing, which could disrupt the predator-prey interaction that commonly occurs between fish larvae (predators) and copepods (prey). If the dynamic of this interaction changes then the community structure and ecological function of estuaries could be altered.
