= Acartia jilletti =

Scientific classification
- Domain: Eukaryota
- Kingdom: Animalia
- Phylum: Arthropoda
- Class: Copepoda
- Order: Calanoida
- Family: Acartiidae
- Genus: Acartia
- Species: A. jilletti

Binomial name
- Acartia jilletti Bradford, 1976

Species of crustacean

Acartia jilletti is a species of marine copepod belonging to the family Acartiidae. This species has a total length of up to 1 mm. It is very similar to Acartia ensifera but the female can be distinguished by the shorter caudal rami and the male by the relative length of spines on the fifth pair of legs. This species has been recorded from scattered locations around the coast of New Zealand.
