= Calocalanus elegans =

Scientific classification
- Kingdom: Animalia
- Phylum: Arthropoda
- Clade: Pancrustacea
- Class: Copepoda
- Order: Calanoida
- Family: Paracalanidae
- Genus: Calocalanus
- Species: C. elegans

Binomial name
- Calocalanus elegans Shmeleva, 1965

Species of crustacean

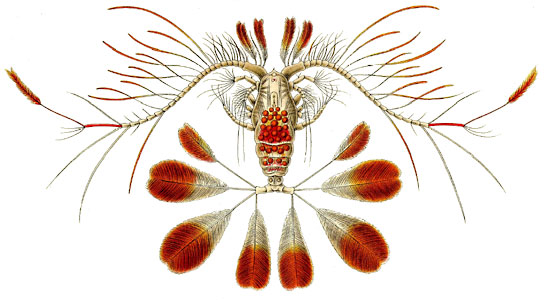
Calocalanus pavo (Dana, 1852), male

Calocalanus elegans is a species of calanoid copepod in the family Paracalanidae. It is found in Europe.
