= Eucalanus bungii =

Scientific classification
- Domain: Eukaryota
- Kingdom: Animalia
- Phylum: Arthropoda
- Class: Copepoda
- Order: Calanoida
- Family: Eucalanidae
- Genus: Eucalanus
- Species: E. bungii

Binomial name
- Eucalanus bungii Giesbrecht, 1893

Species of crustacean

Eucalanus bungii is a copepod found in the north Pacific and surrounding waters.

== Description ==
Eucalanus bungii females generally range from about 5.5 to 8 millimetres (0.22 to 0.31 in) in length. Males are usually between about 4.8 and 6.2 millimetres (0.19 and 0.24 in). Separation of males from females is possible in stage IV copepodites and older individuals.

== Distribution ==
Eucalanus bungii is found in the north Pacific, and is considered to be an expatriate to Arctic waters.

== Ecology ==
=== Life cycle and reproduction ===
There are two peaks of reproduction in E. bungii. At Station P, these peaks were observed to occur in early May and early June. At Site H, off of the east coast of Hokkaido, on the other hand, reproduction occurred from April to June or July, and in August. Spawning occurs at night, when the females migrate to the mixed layer. Nauplii through stage II copepodites are found almost exclusively in the top 250 metres (820 ft) of depth, and they are particularly abundant above the thermocline. During the peak of their abundance, stage III through V copepodites and stage VI female copepodites are found above the thermocline. Stage VI male copepodites, on the other hand, are primarily found between 250 and 500 metres (820 and 1,640 ft) when they peak in abundance.

It has been proposed that at Site H, the young spawned earlier in the year enter diapause as stage IV copepodites, and thus have an annual lifecycle, and those spawned later enter diapause as stage III copepodites, and then enter diapause again as stage V copepodites, rendering their life cycle biennial. At Station P, the life cycle of E. bungii seems to be biennial, with stage III or IV copepodites entering diapause in their first summer, and then entering diapause again, usually as stage V copepodites, their second summer. Diapause occurs at depths mainly from 250 to 500 metres (820 to 1,640 ft). It was found that at Site H, stage IV copepodites are generally found at this depth in diapause, whereas other copepodites in diapause were found to depths of 2,000 metres (6,600 ft). At Site H, diapause occurs from August to March.
