= Acartia tonsa =

Scientific classification
- Domain: Eukaryota
- Kingdom: Animalia
- Phylum: Arthropoda
- Class: Copepoda
- Order: Calanoida
- Family: Acartiidae
- Genus: Acartia
- Species: A. tonsa

Binomial name
- Acartia tonsa Dana, 1849

Synonyms
- Acartia giesbrechti Dahl F., 1894; Acartia gracilis Herrick, 1887

Species of crustacean

Acartia tonsa is a species of marine copepod in the family Acartiidae.

== Distribution ==
Acartia tonsa is a species of calanoid copepod that can be found in a large portion of the world's estuaries and areas of upwelling where food concentrations are high.

Like many plankton common to estuarine ecosystems, they can live in a wide range of temperatures and salinities. The wide distribution of Acartia tonsa may be a result of these copepods being transported as ballast in ships. Their tolerance to changes in salinity has likely contributed to their success as an invasive species in some regions.

== Characteristics ==
Acartia tonsa is translucent, and is usually between about .8 and 1.5 millimetres (0.031 and 0.059 in) in length in females, and from about .8 to 1.3 millimetres (0.031 to 0.051 in) in males. It "[c]an be differentiated from closely related species by their long first antennae (at least half the length of their bodies) and biramous (branched) second antennae, as well as the presence of a joint between their fifth and sixth body segments".

== Ecology and behavior ==
In estuaries and coastal waters which are warm throughout the year, A. tonsa is found year-round. In cooler climates including the North Atlantic, it is frequently the dominant zooplankton in the spring and summer. Acartia tonsa produces eggs in the winter in colder geographic regions. The eggs hatch when temperatures exceed 15 °C (59 °F).

They are an important food source for many commercial fish species. Several studies indicate they aggregate near the ocean floor during the day and rise closer to the surface at night. This behavior likely helps A. tonsa avoid predators who rely on vision to locate and capture prey.

=== Feeding ===
A. tonsa nauplii and adults feed on phytoplankton as well as planktonic ciliates and rotifers. It acts as a suspension feeder when feeding on phytoplankton. When feeding on motile prey it acts as an ambush feeder; it stays nearly motionless in the water, detects movement of its prey, and then jumps toward the prey. Moderate amounts of turbulence improve rates of ambush feedings.
