= Pseudocalanus minutus =

Scientific classification
- Domain: Eukaryota
- Kingdom: Animalia
- Phylum: Arthropoda
- Class: Copepoda
- Order: Calanoida
- Family: Clausocalanidae
- Genus: Pseudocalanus
- Species: P. minutus

Binomial name
- Pseudocalanus minutus (Kro̸yer, 1845)

Species of crustacean

Pseudocalanus minutus is a small copepod found in the Arctic Ocean and surrounding waters.

== Description ==
A small copepod, the female is generally between 1 and 2.15 millimetres (0.039 and 0.085 in), and the male typically between .85 and 1.6 millimetres (0.033 and 0.063 in) in length.

== Distribution ==
Pseudocalanus minutus is found primarily in the Arctic, but it is also found in the northwest Atlantic, the northern Pacific, and more temperate waters where Atlantic and Arctic waters are mixed.

== Ecology ==
=== Life cycle and reproduction ===
In Toyama Bay, P. minutus reproduces from February to April, producing two generations. This is during the temperature minimum (of about 10 to 12 °C (50 to 54 °F)) and phytoplankton maximum. All stages are found at shallower depths during the night (diel vertical migration) in Toyama Bay during this time. During the annual temperature maximum (of over 26 °C (79 °F)) in September, stage V copepodites migrate (possibly gradually) to deeper, colder waters to diapause (in contrast to the congeneric P. newmani, which does not seem to be able to diapause). They moult to adults before January, rising to the surface to breed. In Kongsfjorden, P. minutus reproduces during May and June, producing one generation (consistent with a trend for higher latitude populations to produce less generations). It descends in autumn and winter (Note: All seasons are for the Northern Hemisphere) to depths below 100 metres (330 ft) as a stage III to stage V copepodite. Females and stage I copepodites are found throughout the water column during November. From June and July till May, younger stages tend to be found towards the surface, and older stages tend to migrate to overwinter earlier. It develops during the winter and reproduces with energy gained from the spring phytoplankton bloom, indicating a one year life cycle.

=== Feeding ===
Pseudocalanus minutus is opportunistic, being mainly herbivorous except during the winter, when it is either carnivorous or omnivorous.
