= Ellobiopsis =

Scientific classification
- Domain: Eukaryota
- (unranked): SAR
- (unranked): Alveolata
- Phylum: Dinozoa
- Class: Ellobiopsea
- Order: Ellobiopsida
- Family: Ellobiopsidae
- Genus: Ellobiopsis Caullery, 1910

Species
- Ellobiopsis caridarum Ellobiopsis chattonii Ellobiopsis elongata Ellobiopsis eupraxiae Ellobiopsis fagei Ellobiopsis racemosus

Genus of single-celled organisms

Ellobiopsis is a genus of unicellular, ectoparasitic eukaryotes causing disease in crustaceans. This genus is widespread and has been found infecting copepods from both marine and freshwater ecosystems. parasitism has been seen to interfere with fertility in both sexes of copepods.

== Taxonomy and history ==
The Ellobiopsis type species, Ellobiopsis chattoni, was first described in 1910 by Caullery after being isolated from an infected copepod found in the Mediterranean Sea. Ellobiopsis was first classified as a dinoflagellate, but observation of a spore forming organelle concluded that the Ellobiopsis was not a part of this group. Phylogeny based on small subunit (SSU) ribosomal DNA places Ellobiopsis in the Alveolata. In the family Ellobiopsidae, the most closely related genus is Thalassomyces. Three species have been defined in this genus: Ellobiopsis chattoni Caullery (1910), Ellobiopsis elongata Steuer (1932) and Ellobiopsis fagei Hovasse (1951). These species are characterized by morphology of their reproductive structures and their ability to infect species specific hosts.

== Description ==
=== Morphology ===
During dispersal, unflagellated spores of Ellobiopsis land on the surface of potential hosts. Once in contact with a host, the cell body of the organism grows and takes on an oval shape. A rhizoid pierces the host cuticle to root the parasite in the copepod tissue. The cell body constricts in the center and differentiate into trophomere and gonomere, proximal and distal to the host body. The cell forms a conical shape. The number of gonomeres is distinguishes species. The cell body has been seen to grows to a length of 700 μm and a width of 350 μm.

=== Life cycle ===
The parasitic life cycle of Ellobiopsis chattoni begins with a spore that lands on the surface of a host appendage. A stalk attaches the parasite to the host and it uses an organelle for penetration, called a rhizoid, of the cuticle and to root itself in the host tissue. As the cell grows the root is used for absorption, causing damaging to the local host tissue. Once established at a specific size, approximately 400 μm, the cell body begins to partition itself in half. The half not attached to the host becomes the gonomere and the half attached to the host is named the trophomere. As the gonomere and trophomere partitioning continues to partition, the spore begins to form in the gonomere and it takes on a granulated texture. The pre-spores are released from the reproductive body and form spores for dispersal to the next host.

== Host records ==
- E. chattonii — Acartia clausi, Calanus helgolandica, Calanus finmarchicus, Centropages typicus, Clausocalanus arcuicornis, Ctenocalanus vanus, Euchaeta marina, Euchaeta wolfendeni, Metridia longa, Pleuromamma gracilis, Pleuromamma borealis, Portunus pelagicus, Pseudocalanus elongatus, Pseudocalanus minutus, Undinula vulgaris
- E. elongata — Clausocalanus arcuicornis, Ctenocalanus vanus, Cosmocalanus darwini, Euchaeta marina, Gaetanus antarcticus, Gaetanus curvicornis, Penaeopsis retacuta
- E. fagei — Clausocalanus arcuicornis
