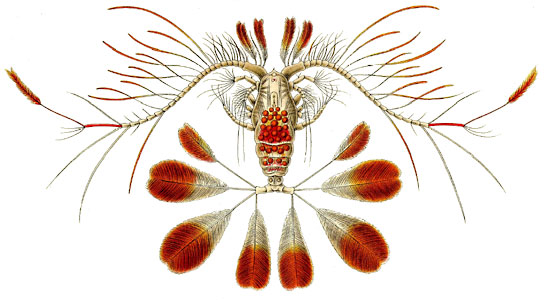

Scientific classification
- Kingdom: Animalia
- Phylum: Arthropoda
- Clade: Pancrustacea
- Class: Copepoda
- Order: Calanoida
- Family: Paracalanidae
- Genus: Calocalanus
- Species: C. pavo

Binomial name
- Calocalanus pavo (Dana, 1852)

= Calocalanus pavo =

Species of crustacean

Calocalanus pavo is a species of copepod in the family Paracalanidae. The species was previously placed in genus Calanus and family Calocalanidae.
