= Acartia simplex =

Scientific classification
- Domain: Eukaryota
- Kingdom: Animalia
- Phylum: Arthropoda
- Class: Copepoda
- Order: Calanoida
- Family: Acartiidae
- Genus: Acartia
- Species: A. simplex

Binomial name
- Acartia simplex G. O. Sars, 1905

Species of crustacean

Acartia simplex is a species of marine copepod belonging to the family Acartiidae. It is found in the waters near Australia and New Zealand.

This species, just under 1 mm in length, is rather similar to Acartia ensifera but can be distinguished by the presence of spines on the dorsal part of the posterior body segment (metasome). Like A. ensifera, it is found around the coasts of New Zealand, mainly in estuarine habitats.
