= Subeucalanus pileatus =

Scientific classification
- Domain: Eukaryota
- Kingdom: Animalia
- Phylum: Arthropoda
- Class: Copepoda
- Order: Calanoida
- Family: Eucalanidae
- Genus: Subeucalanus
- Species: S. pileatus

Binomial name
- Subeucalanus pileatus (Giesbrecht, 1888)

Synonyms
- Eucalanus pileatus Giesbrecht, 1888

Species of crustacean

Subeucalanus pileatus is a tropical and subtropical copepod.

== Description ==
The female of S. pileatus generally ranges from about 1.8 to 2.5 millimetres (0.071 to 0.098 in) in length, and the male is usually between about 1.7 and 2.3 millimetres (0.067 and 0.091 in) in length.

== Distribution ==
Subeucalanus pileatus is found around in world in subtropical and tropical waters.

== Ecology ==
=== Life cycle and reproduction ===
Subeucalanus pileatus reproduces continuously, and is active throughout the year. In June and July in the Gulf of Mexico, copepodite stages I through III are found in the layer below the surface with the highest concentrations of chlorophyll a. Adults and copepodite stages IV and V, on the other hand, are uncommon during this time.
