= Xanthocalanus amabilis =

Scientific classification
- Kingdom: Animalia
- Phylum: Arthropoda
- Clade: Pancrustacea
- Class: Copepoda
- Order: Calanoida
- Family: Phaennidae
- Genus: Xanthocalanus
- Species: X. amabilis

Binomial name
- Xanthocalanus amabilis Tanaka, 1960

Species of crustacean

Xanthocalanus amabilis is a species of copepod, and was first described in 1960 by the Japanese zoologist, Otohiko Tanaka.

The type specimen was found in Sagami Bay, in the waters off the Izu Peninsula, near Tokyo.
