= Acartia lefevreae =

Scientific classification
- Domain: Eukaryota
- Kingdom: Animalia
- Phylum: Arthropoda
- Class: Copepoda
- Order: Calanoida
- Family: Acartiidae
- Genus: Acartia
- Species: A. lefevreae

Binomial name
- Acartia lefevreae Bradford, 1976

Synonyms
- Acartia lefevrae Bradford, 1976 [lapsus]

Species of crustacean

Acartia lefevreae is a species of copepod belonging to the family Acartiidae. This species was discovered when specimens previously identified as Acartia clausi were examined and found to belong to a separate species. Its range overlaps with that of A. clausi, being found in the western Mediterranean and the north east Atlantic as far north as the English Channel, but it tends to be found in more brackish habitats such as estuaries.

This species is generally similar to A. clausi but is usually noticeably smaller (total length 0.8–0.9 mm) and differs in the arrangement and size of the spines on the back of the posterior body segment (metasome).
