= Xanthocalanus kurilensis =

Scientific classification
- Kingdom: Animalia
- Phylum: Arthropoda
- Clade: Pancrustacea
- Class: Copepoda
- Order: Calanoida
- Family: Phaennidae
- Genus: Xanthocalanus
- Species: X. kurilensis

Binomial name
- Xanthocalanus kurilensis Brodsky, 1950

Species of crustacean

Xanthocalanus kurilensis is a species of pelagic copepod, which was first described in 1950 by the Russian zoologist, Konstantin Abramovich Brodsky.

It was described from a specimen taken in the seas of the Kuril Islands (kurilensis). It has also been found in the seas off the Korean Peninsula.
