= Xanthocalanus medius =

Scientific classification
- Kingdom: Animalia
- Phylum: Arthropoda
- Clade: Pancrustacea
- Class: Copepoda
- Order: Calanoida
- Family: Phaennidae
- Genus: Xanthocalanus
- Species: X. medius

Binomial name
- Xanthocalanus medius Tanaka, 1937

Species of crustacean

Xanthocalanus medius is a species of copepod, which was first described in 1937 by the Japanese zoologist, Otohiko Tanaka.

The type specimen was found in the deep waters of Suruga Bay. It has also been found in the seas off the Korean Peninsula.
