= Xanthocalanus cornifer =

Scientific classification
- Kingdom: Animalia
- Phylum: Arthropoda
- Clade: Pancrustacea
- Class: Copepoda
- Order: Calanoida
- Family: Phaennidae
- Genus: Xanthocalanus
- Species: X. cornifer

Binomial name
- Xanthocalanus cornifer (Tanaka, 1960)

Synonyms
- Amallophora cornifer Tanaka, 1960

Species of crustacean

Xanthocalanus cornifer is a species of pelagic copepod. The species was first described in 1960 as Amallophora cornifer by Otohiko Tanaka from a single male taken from Suruga Bay in a haul at 600-400 m, in November, 1937.

In 1983, Janet Bradford reaffirmed that Amallophora was a junior synonym of Xanthocalanus and in this paper she transferred this species to Xanthocalanus cornifer.
