= Euaugaptilus hyperboreus =

Scientific classification
- Domain: Eukaryota
- Kingdom: Animalia
- Phylum: Arthropoda
- Class: Copepoda
- Order: Calanoida
- Family: Augaptilidae
- Genus: Euaugaptilus
- Species: E. hyperboreus

Binomial name
- Euaugaptilus hyperboreus Brodsky, 1950

Species of crustacean

Euaugaptilus hyperboreus is a species of deep-water copepod.
