= Paracyclopia =

Conservation status
- Critically Endangered (IUCN 2.3)

Scientific classification
- Kingdom: Animalia
- Phylum: Arthropoda
- Class: Copepoda
- Order: Calanoida
- Family: Pseudocyclopiidae
- Genus: Paracyclopia; Fosshagen, 1985
- Species: P. naessi

Binomial name
- Paracyclopia naessi Fosshagen, 1985

Genus of crustaceans

Paracyclopia is a genus of copepods in family Pseudocyclopiidae, containing only the species Paracyclopia naessi. It is endemic to Bermudan karsts and is critically endangered.
