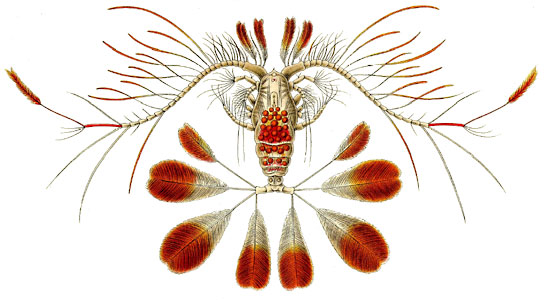
- male Calocalanus pavo

Scientific classification
- Domain: Eukaryota
- Kingdom: Animalia
- Phylum: Arthropoda
- Class: Copepoda
- Order: Calanoida
- Family: Paracalanidae; Bernard, 1958
- Genus: Calocalanus; Giesbrecht, 1888

Synonyms
- Ischnocalanus Bernhard, 1963; Leptocalanus Bernhard, 1954

= Calocalanus =

Genus of crustaceans

Calocalanus is a genus of copepods, the only genus in the family Calocalanidae:

- Calocalanus aculeatus Shmeleva, 1987
- Calocalanus adriaticus Shmeleva, 1965
- Calocalanus africanus Shmeleva, 1979
- Calocalanus alboranus Shmeleva, 1979
- Calocalanus antarcticus Shmeleva, 1978
- Calocalanus atlanticus Shmeleva, 1975
- Calocalanus beklemishevi Shmeleva, 1987
- Calocalanus contractus Farran, 1926
- Calocalanus curtus Andronov, 1973
- Calocalanus dellacrocei Shmeleva, 1987
- Calocalanus elegans Shmeleva, 1965
- Calocalanus elongatus Shmeleva, 1968
- Calocalanus equalicauda (Bernard, 1958)
- Calocalanus fiolenti Shmeleva, 1978
- Calocalanus fusiformis Shmeleva, 1978
- Calocalanus gracilis Tanaka, 1956
- Calocalanus gresei Shmeleva, 1973
- Calocalanus indicus Shmeleva, 1974
- Calocalanus kristalli Shmeleva, 1968
- Calocalanus latus Shmeleva, 1968
- Calocalanus lomonosovi Shmeleva, 1975
- Calocalanus longifurca Shmeleva, 1975
- Calocalanus longisetosus Shmeleva, 1965
- Calocalanus longispinus Shmeleva, 1978
- Calocalanus minor Shmeleva, 1980
- Calocalanus minutus Andronov, 1973
- Calocalanus monospinus Chen & Shen, 1974
- Calocalanus namibiensis Andronov, 1973
- Calocalanus nanus Shmeleva, 1987
- Calocalanus neptunus Shmeleva, 1965
- Calocalanus omaniensis Shmeleva, 1975
- Calocalanus ovalis Shmeleva, 1965
- Calocalanus paracontractus Shmeleva, 1974
- Calocalanus parelongatus Shmeleva, 1979
- Calocalanus pavo (Dana, 1852)
- Calocalanus pavoninus Farran, 1936
- Calocalanus plumatus Shmeleva, 1965
- Calocalanus plumulosus (Claus, 1863)
- Calocalanus pseudocontractus Bernard, 1958
- Calocalanus pubes Andronov, 1973
- Calocalanus pyriformis Shmeleva, 1975
- Calocalanus regini Shmeleva, 1987
- Calocalanus sayademalja Shmeleva, 1987
- Calocalanus spinosus Shmeleva, 1987
- Calocalanus styliremis Giesbrecht, 1888
- Calocalanus tenuiculus Andronov, 1973
- Calocalanus vinogradovi Shmeleva, 1987
- Calocalanus vitjazi Shmeleva, 1974
- Calocalanus vivesei Shmeleva, 1979
