= Hemirhabdus =

Scientific classification
- Domain: Eukaryota
- Kingdom: Animalia
- Phylum: Arthropoda
- Class: Copepoda
- Order: Calanoida
- Family: Heterorhabdidae
- Genus: Hemirhabdus; Wolfenden, 1911

Genus of crustaceans

Hemirhabdus is a genus of copepods belonging to the family Heterorhabdidae.

The species of this genus are found in all world oceans.

Species:

- Hemirhabdus amplus Park, 2000
- Hemirhabdus grimaldii (Richard, 1893)
