= Erebonectes =

Scientific classification
- Kingdom: Animalia
- Phylum: Arthropoda
- Class: Copepoda
- Order: Calanoida
- Family: Epacteriscidae
- Genus: Erebonectes; Fosshagen, 1985

Species
- Erebonectes macrochaetus Fosshagen & Iliffe, 1994; Erebonectes nesioticus Fosshagen, 1985

Genus of crustaceans

Erebonectes is a genus of crustaceans in the family Epacteriscidae, containing two troglobitic species. E. nasioticus was discovered in Bermuda and described in 1985; it is listed as critically endangered on the IUCN Red List. E. macrochaetus was found on Middle Caicos and described in 1994.
