= Xanthocalanus =

Scientific classification
- Kingdom: Animalia
- Phylum: Arthropoda
- Clade: Pancrustacea
- Class: Copepoda
- Order: Calanoida
- Family: Phaennidae
- Genus: Xanthocalanus; Giesbrecht, 1893

Type species
- Xanthocalanus agilis Giesbrecht, 1893

Synonyms
- Amallophora Scott T., 1894 (ambiguous)

Genus of crustaceans

Xanthocalanus is a genus of planktonic copepods, usually found in pelagic or benthopelagic waters. The genus was first described in 1893 by Wilhelm Giesbrecht, with the type species being Xanthocalanus agilis Giesbrecht, 1893.

In 1973, Janet Bradford reaffirmed that Amallophora was a junior synonym of Xanthocalanus, and revised its description.

It contains the following species

- Xanthocalanus agilis Giesbrecht, 1893
- Xanthocalanus alvinae Grice & Hulsemann, 1970
- Xanthocalanus amabilis Tanaka, 1960
- Species Xanthocalanus antarcticus Wolfenden, 1908
- Xanthocalanus claviger (Scott T., 1909)
- Xanthocalanus cornifer (Tanaka, 1960)
- Xanthocalanus crassirostris (Tanaka, 1960)
- Xanthocalanus dilatus Grice, 1962
- Xanthocalanus echinatus Sars G.O., 1907
- Xanthocalanus fallax Sars G.O., 1921
- Xanthocalanus giesbrechti Thompson I.C., 1903
- Xanthocalanus gracilis Wolfenden, 1911
- Xanthocalanus harpagatus Bradford & Wells, 1983
- Xanthocalanus hirtipes Vanhöffen, 1897
- Xanthocalanus hispidus Grice & Hulsemann, 1967
- Xanthocalanus incertus Sars G.O., 1920
- Xanthocalanus irritans (Tanaka, 1960)
- Xanthocalanus kurilensis Brodsky, 1950
- Xanthocalanus legatus Tanaka, 1960
- Xanthocalanus longispinus Bradford-Grieve, 2004
- Xanthocalanus macilenta (Grice & Hulsemann, 1970)
- Xanthocalanus marlyae Campaner, 1978
- Xanthocalanus medius Tanaka, 1937
- Xanthocalanus meteorae Markhaseva & Schnack-Schiel, 2003
- Xanthocalanus minor Giesbrecht, 1893
- Xanthocalanus mixtus Sars G.O., 1920
- Xanthocalanus multispinus Chen & Zhang, 1975
- Xanthocalanus muticus Sars G.O., 1905
- Xanthocalanus obtusus Farran, 1905
- Xanthocalanus oculatus (Tanaka, 1960)
- Xanthocalanus pavlovskii Brodsky, 1955
- Xanthocalanus pectinatus Tanaka, 1960
- Xanthocalanus penicillatus Tanaka, 1960
- Xanthocalanus pinguis Farran, 1905
- Xanthocalanus polarsternae Markhaseva, 1998
- Xanthocalanus profundus Sars G.O., 1907
- Xanthocalanus propinquus Sars G.O., 1902
- Xanthocalanus pulcher Esterly, 1911
- Xanthocalanus quasiprofundus Vyshkvartzeva, 2002
- Xanthocalanus rotundus (Grice & Hulsemann, 1970)
- Xanthocalanus serratus (Tanaka, 1960)
- Xanthocalanus simplex Aurivillius, 1898
- Xanthocalanus spinodenticulatus Markhaseva, 1998
- Xanthocalanus squamatus Farran, 1936
- Xanthocalanus stewarti Bradford-Grieve, 2004
- Xanthocalanus subagilis Wolfenden, 1904
- Xanthocalanus tenuiremis Scott T., 1909
- Xanthocalanus tenuiserratus Wolfenden, 1911
- Xanthocalanus typicus (Scott T., 1894)
