= Calanipeda =

Scientific classification
- Kingdom: Animalia
- Phylum: Arthropoda
- Class: Copepoda
- Order: Calanoida
- Family: Pseudodiaptomidae
- Genus: Calanipeda; Krichagin, 1873
- Species: C. aquaedulcis

Binomial name
- Calanipeda aquaedulcis Krichagin, 1873

Genus of crustaceans

Calanipeda is a monotypic genus of crustaceans belonging to the family Pseudodiaptomidae. The only species is Calanipeda aquaedulcis.

The species is found in Southwestern Europe.
