= Robertus cantabricus =

Scientific classification
- Domain: Eukaryota
- Kingdom: Animalia
- Phylum: Arthropoda
- Subphylum: Chelicerata
- Class: Arachnida
- Order: Araneae
- Infraorder: Araneomorphae
- Family: Theridiidae
- Genus: Robertus
- Species: R. cantabricus

Binomial name
- Robertus cantabricus Louis Fage, 1931

Species of spider

Robertus cantabricus is a spider in the family Theridiidae. The scientific name of this species was first published in 1931 by Louis Fage.
