= Pseudocalanus newmani =

Scientific classification
- Domain: Eukaryota
- Kingdom: Animalia
- Phylum: Arthropoda
- Class: Copepoda
- Order: Calanoida
- Family: Clausocalanidae
- Genus: Pseudocalanus
- Species: P. newmani

Binomial name
- Pseudocalanus newmani Frost, 1989

Species of crustacean

Pseudocalanus newmani is a copepod found in Arctic and northern Pacific waters. It was described by Frost in 1989. It is found in the Arctic and surrounding waters. There are multiple generations. Unlike some copepods, P. newmani undergoes reverse diel vertical migration, descending during the night, and ascending during the day, although it may undergo normal or no migration at all depending on predation. This copepod is primarily herbivorous.

== Taxonomy ==
Pseudocalanus newmani was originally described by Frost in 1989 from multiple samples caught in the main basin of Puget Sound. Its specific name references Bill H. Newman.

== Description ==
Female P. newmani usually range in length from about 0.9 to 1.5 millimetres (0.035 to 0.059 in), and the male is generally between about 0.8 and 1.2 millimetres (0.031 and 0.047 in). The female is distinguished from other species by its rounded cephalosome, which is barely anterior to the rostrum. It is also distinguished by its urosomal segments being the longest in its genus relative to cephalosome length. The male is distinguished by having a ratio of basal to coxal segments of the fourth leg being less than 1.5. Additionally, the male lacks sensilla on the mediodorsal portion of the second to fourth urosomal segments.

== Distribution ==
Pseudocalanus newmani is found in the Arctic, the northern Pacific, and in the Atlantic off of the eastern coast of Canada and Maine. It is also found in the Hudson Bay.

== Ecology ==
=== Life cycle and reproduction ===
In Toyama Bay, P. newmani reproduces and actively grows between February and April. During this time, there are three generations. The period of reproduction and growth corresponds to the time when water temperatures are lowest at the top 100 metres (330 ft) (around 10 to 12 °C (50 to 54 °F)), and the abundance of phytoplankton reaches its maximum. Females can generally produce anywhere from one to four eggs per day when breeding. In Toyama Bay, after a reproduction event in 1990, there were no copepods of this species found until November. This corresponded with surface water temperatures above 15 °C (59 °F). This, along with a lack of large lipid stores, likely indicates that it cannot migrate to cooler waters and enter diapause. Additionally, it develops quicker in warmer waters until temperatures of at least 15 °C (59 °F). At Dabob Bay, the population recovery occurs earlier, around July. The abundance of this copepod, at least in the Dabob Bay, is related to the abundance of predators, especially the predatory chaetognath Sagitta elegans.

Pseudocalanus newmani usually undergoes reverse diel vertical migration, ascending in the day, and descending in the night, a reversal of normal diel vertical migration. The reason for this is because of predators (such as omnivorous copepods that have normal diel vertical migration) being more abundant during the night. When predators are not present in large numbers, it usually does not descend at night, instead constantly staying at the surface. This has fitness benefits, as clutches developed in deeper waters have decreased survivorship. But, when predators are found at the surface during the day, P. newmani experiences normal diel vertical migration. It can switch between migration strategies quickly, sometimes in under five weeks. As a whole, this migration (normal or otherwise) does not seem to be undertaken by copepodite stage I through III, likely because they have lower mortality rates. When predation is not a factor, this copepod prefers to reside in the layers with the most chlorophyll a.

=== Feeding ===
Pseudocalanus newmani is mainly herbivorous, and feeds continuously, with an increased intake during the night. It prefers centric diatoms, even though aldehydes of the diatom genus Thalassiosira, for example, can be toxic to its young in large quantities. This is seen in the reduced reproductive success (both in terms of hatching success and naupliar viability) of P. newmani fed exclusively diatoms in the laboratory, and the reduced success of this copepod during Thalassiosira blooms.

=== Predators ===
Pseudocalanus newmani has multiple predators, and adjusts its behaviour around them. One predator is the copepod Euchaeta elongata, which (in females, as least) likely can consume 19 adults of P. newmani each day. The chaetognath Sagitta elegans, another predator of this copepod, can ingest up to about five females per day. An adult Euphausia pacifica can attack, on average, about two female P. newmani per day. Three-spined stickleback, juvenile chum salmon, and other planktivorous fish can attack this copepod. In response to the normal diel vertical migration of predators like Euchaeta elongata, it performs a reverse diel vertical migration so as to not co-occur in depth with feeding predators. It may also perform normal diel vertical migration when visually-reliant predators are more important, and no migration when predators do not have a large enough effect.
