= Pseudocalanus elongatus =

Scientific classification
- Domain: Eukaryota
- Kingdom: Animalia
- Phylum: Arthropoda
- Class: Copepoda
- Order: Calanoida
- Family: Clausocalanidae
- Genus: Pseudocalanus
- Species: P. elongatus

Binomial name
- Pseudocalanus elongatus (Boeck, 1865)

Species of crustacean

Pseudocalanus elongatus is a copepod found primarily in the Atlantic Ocean.

== Description ==
The female P. elongatus ranges from about .7 to 1.8 millimetres (0.028 to 0.071 in) in length, and the male is usually between about .5 and 1.4 millimetres (0.020 and 0.055 in).

== Distribution ==
Pseudocalanus elongatus is generally found in temperate or sub-Arctic waters in the Atlantic and in the western Mediterranean Sea, although it is also found in the Arctic, and off of the southwestern coast of the United States.

== Ecology ==
=== Life cycle and reproduction ===
Pseudocalanus elongatus is abundant (at least off the coast of Plymouth, UK) from March to October, and breeds from January to December, usually having from four to six generations. It is most abundant from April to August, and peaks during June and August. In the southern North Sea, P. elongatus breeds year round. The peaks in abundance here in June, August, and October is likely caused by advection of other individuals into the area. In this region, maximum reproduction occurs during April and May (during which the concentration of chlorophyll a is at its highest), clutch size and egg production rate being highest during this period. Clutch size, hatching success, and egg production rate are negatively correlated with temperature. The proportion of breeding females is significantly related to the concentration of chlorophyll a.
