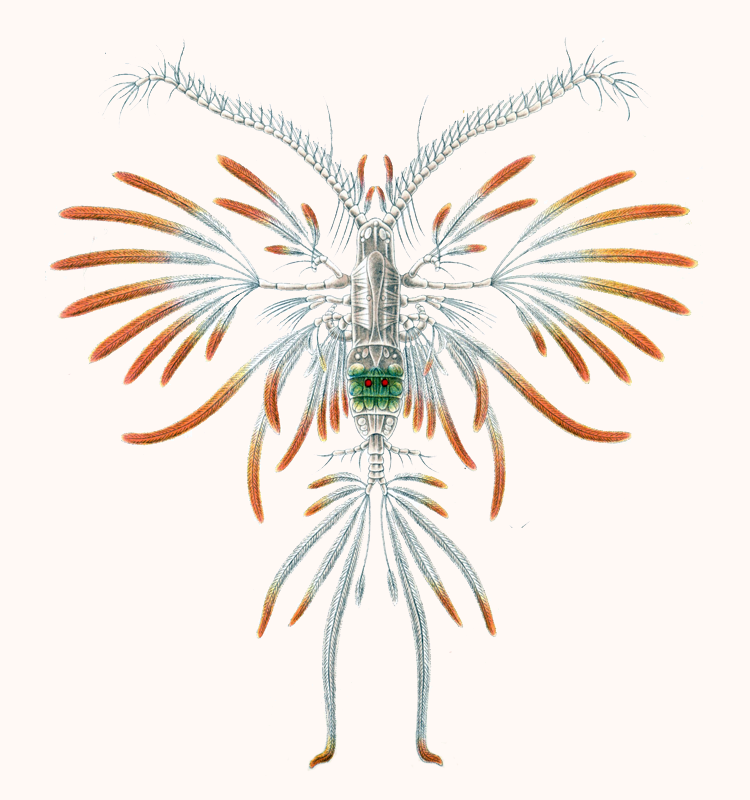
- Euaugaptilus filigerus

Scientific classification
- Domain: Eukaryota
- Kingdom: Animalia
- Phylum: Arthropoda
- Class: Copepoda
- Order: Calanoida
- Family: Augaptilidae
- Genus: Euaugaptilus; G. O. Sars, 1920

Synonyms
- Neoaugaptilus Brodsky, 1950

= Euaugaptilus =

Genus of crustaceans

Euaugaptilus is a genus of copepods. The genus contains bioluminescent species.

== Genera ==
The genus contains the following species:

- Euaugaptilus affinis G. O. Sars, 1920
- Euaugaptilus aliquantus Park, 1993
- Euaugaptilus angustus (G. O. Sars, 1905)
- Euaugaptilus antarcticus (Wolfenden, 1911)
- Euaugaptilus atlanticus Roe, 1975
- Euaugaptilus austrinus Park, 1993
- Euaugaptilus brevirostratus Park, 1993
- Euaugaptilus brodskyi Hulsemann, 1967
- Euaugaptilus bullifer (Giesbrecht, 1889)
- Euaugaptilus clavatus (G. O. Sars, 1907)
- Euaugaptilus curtus Grice & Hulsemann, 1967
- Euaugaptilus digitatus G. O. Sars, 1920
- Euaugaptilus diminutus Park, 1970
- Euaugaptilus distinctus (Brodsky, 1950)
- Euaugaptilus elongatus (G. O. Sars, 1905)
- Euaugaptilus facilis (Farran, 1908)
- Euaugaptilus fagettiae T. K. S. Björnberg, 1975
- Euaugaptilus farrani G. O. Sars, 1920
- Euaugaptilus fecundus Tanaka & Omori, 1974
- Euaugaptilus filigerus (Claus, 1863)
- Euaugaptilus fosaii Pineda-Polo, 1979
- Euaugaptilus fundatus Grice & Hulsemann, 1967
- Euaugaptilus gibbus (Wolfenden, 1904)
- Euaugaptilus gracilis (G. O. Sars, 1905)
- Euaugaptilus graciloides Brodsky, 1950
- Euaugaptilus grandicornis G. O. Sars, 1920
- Euaugaptilus hadrocephalus Park, 1993
- Euaugaptilus hecticus (Giesbrecht, 1893)
- Euaugaptilus hulsemannae Matthews, 1972
- Euaugaptilus humilis Farran, 1926
- Euaugaptilus hyperboreus Brodsky, 1950
- Euaugaptilus indicus Sewell, 1932
- Euaugaptilus laticeps (G. O. Sars, 1905)
- Euaugaptilus latifrons (G. O. Sars, 1907)
- Euaugaptilus longicirrhus (G. O. Sars, 1905)
- Euaugaptilus longimanus (G. O. Sars, 1905)
- Euaugaptilus longiseta Grice & Hulsemann, 1965
- Euaugaptilus luxus Tanaka & Omori, 1974
- Euaugaptilus magnus (Wolfenden, 1904)
- Euaugaptilus malacus Grice & Hulsemann, 1967
- Euaugaptilus marginatus Tanaka, 1964
- Euaugaptilus matsuei Tanaka & Omori, 1967
- Euaugaptilus maxillaris G. O. Sars, 1920
- Euaugaptilus modestus Brodsky, 1950
- Euaugaptilus nodifrons (G. O. Sars, 1905)
- Euaugaptilus nudus Tanaka, 1964
- Euaugaptilus oblongus (G. O. Sars, 1905)
- Euaugaptilus pachychaeta Matthews, 1972
- Euaugaptilus pacificus Matthews, 1972
- Euaugaptilus palumboi (Giesbrecht, 1889)
- Euaugaptilus parabullifer Brodsky, 1950
- Euaugaptilus paroblongus Matthews, 1972
- Euaugaptilus penicillatus G. O. Sars, 1920
- Euaugaptilus perasetosus Park, 1993
- Euaugaptilus propinquus G. O. Sars, 1920
- Euaugaptilus pseudaffinis Brodsky, 1950
- Euaugaptilus quaesitus Grice & Hulsemann, 1967
- Euaugaptilus rectus Grice & Hulsemann, 1967
- Euaugaptilus rigidus (G. O. Sars, 1907)
- Euaugaptilus roei Matthews, 1972
- Euaugaptilus sarsi Grice & Hulsemann, 1965
- Euaugaptilus similis (Farran, 1908)
- Euaugaptilus squamatus (Giesbrecht, 1889)
- Euaugaptilus sublongiseta Park, 1970
- Euaugaptilus tenuicaudis (G. O. Sars, 1905)
- Euaugaptilus tenuispinus G. O. Sars, 1920
- Euaugaptilus truncatus (G. O. Sars, 1905)
- Euaugaptilus unisetosus Park, 1970
- Euaugaptilus vescus Park, 1970
- Euaugaptilus vicinus G. O. Sars, 1920
