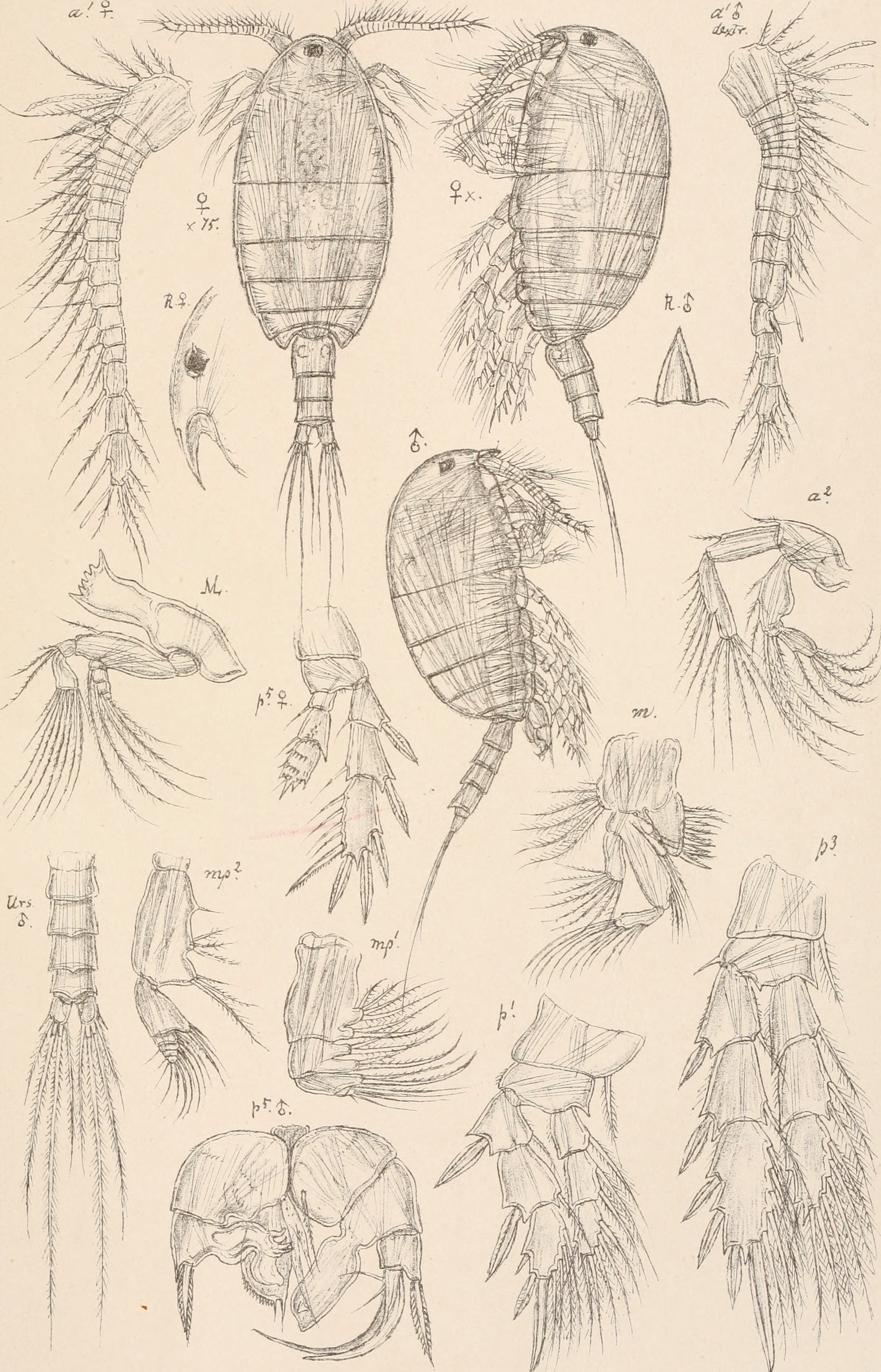

Scientific classification
- Kingdom: Animalia
- Phylum: Arthropoda
- Class: Copepoda
- Order: Calanoida
- Family: Pseudocyclopidae

Synonyms
- Boholiniidae; Ridgewayiidae

= Pseudocyclopidae =

Family of crustaceans

Pseudocyclopidae (/ˌsuːdoʊˌsaɪkləˈpɪdiː/) is a family of copepods belonging to the order Calanoida. They include genera such as Badijella, Boholina, and Brattstromia. Additionally, they are found in marine environments, particularly in waters immediately over the seabed from coastal zones to the edge of the continental shelf.

Giesbrecht identified the Pseudocyclopidae family in 1893, which includes copepods with distinct morphological characteristics such as the absence of an aesthetasc on the fourth antennular segment and a well-developed, elongated two-segmented mandibular endopod with ten terminal setae.

== Classification ==
Wilhelm Giesbrecht (Prussian Zoologist Born in Gdańsk) contributed to the identification and classification of the Pseudocyclopidae family in 1892-1893 as an epilogue of his work on copepods, particularly in his installment Systematik und Faunistik der pelagischen Copepoden des Golfes von Neapel und der angrenzenden Meeres-Abschnitte.

== Genera ==
Genera:

- Badijella Krsinic, 2005
- Boholina Fosshagen, 1989
- Brattstromia Fosshagen, 1991
- Exumellina Fosshagen, 1970
- Normancavia Fosshagen, 1970
- Pinkertonius Fosshagen, 1970
- Pseudocyclops Brady, 1872
- Sipadantonius Ohtsuka, Fosshagen & Putchakarn, 2023
