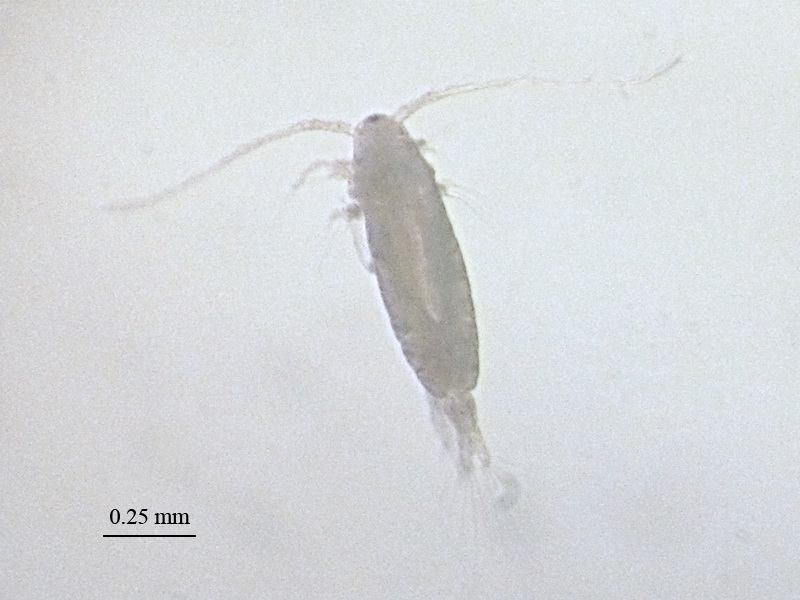
- Acartia clausi

Scientific classification
- Kingdom: Animalia
- Phylum: Arthropoda
- Class: Copepoda
- Order: Calanoida
- Family: Acartiidae
- Genus: Acartia; Dana, 1846

Synonyms
- Dias Lilljeborg, 1853

= Acartia =

Genus of crustaceans

Acartia is a genus of marine calanoid copepods. They are epipelagic, estuarine, zooplanktonic found throughout the oceans of the world, primarily in temperate regions.

== Classification ==
This genus contains the majority of species in the family Acartiidae:

- Acartia adriatica Steuer, 1910
- Acartia amboinensis Carl, 1907
- Acartia arbruta Smith et al., 2021
- Acartia australis Farran, 1936
- Acartia bacorehuisensis Zamora-Sánchez & Gómez-Aguirre, 1986
- Acartia bermudensis Esterly, 1911
- Acartia bifilosa (Giesbrecht, 1881)
- Acartia bilobata Abraham, 1970
- Acartia bispinosa Carl, 1907
- Acartia bowmani Abraham, 1976
- Acartia cagayanensis Sakaguchi & Ueda, 2020
- Acartia californiensis Trinast, 1976
- Acartia centrura Giesbrecht, 1889
- Acartia chilkaensis Sewell, 1919
- Acartia clausi Giesbrecht, 1889
- Acartia danae Giesbrecht, 1889
- Acartia denticornis Brady, 1883
- Acartia discaudata (Giesbrecht, 1882)
- Acartia dweepi Haridas & Madhupratap, 1978
- Acartia edentata Srinui, Ohtsuka & Metillo in Srinui, Ohtsuka, Metillo & Nishibori, 2019
- Acartia ensifera Brady, 1899
- Acartia enzoi Crisafi, 1974
- Acartia erythraea Giesbrecht, 1889
- Acartia fancetti McKinnon, Kimmerer & Benzie, 1992
- Acartia floridana Davis, 1948
- Acartia forcipata I. C. Thompson & A. Scott in Thompson, Scott & Herdman, 1898
- Acartia forticrusa Soh, Moon, Park, Bun & Venmathi Maran, 2013
- Acartia fossae Gurney, 1927
- Acartia hongi Soh & Suh, 2000
- Acartia hudsonica Pinhey, 1926
- Acartia italica Steuer, 1910
- Acartia japonica Mori, 1940
- Acartia jilletti Bradford, 1976
- Acartia laxa Dana, 1852
- Acartia lefevreae Bradford, 1976
- Acartia levequei Grice, 1964
- Acartia lilljeborgii Giesbrecht, 1889
- Acartia limpida Dana, 1849
- Acartia longiremis (Lilljeborg, 1853)
- Acartia longisetosa Brady, 1914
- Acartia macropus Cleve, 1900
- Acartia margalefi Alcaraz, 1976
- Acartia mediterranea Pesta, 1909
- Acartia mollicula Pavlova & Shmeleva, 2010
- Acartia mossi (Norman, 1878)
- Acartia nadiensis Lee, S, Soh & W. Lee, 2019
- Acartia nana Brady, 1914
- Acartia negligens Dana, 1849
- Acartia ohtsukai Ueda & Bucklin, 2006
- Acartia omorii Bradford, 1976
- Acartia pacifica Steuer, 1915
- Acartia pietschmani Pesta, 1912
- Acartia plumosa T. Scott, 1894
- Acartia ponteloides (Kritchagin, 1873)
- Acartia ransoni Vaissière, 1954
- Acartia remivagantis Oliveira, 1946
- Acartia sarojus Madhupratap & Haridas, 1994
- Acartia seshaiyai Subbaraju, 1968
- Acartia simplex G. O. Sars, 1905
- Acartia sinjiensis Mori, 1940
- Acartia southwelli Sewell, 1914
- Acartia spinata Esterly, 1911
- Acartia spinicauda Giesbrecht, 1889
- Acartia steueri Smirnov, 1936
- Acartia teclae Bradford, 1976
- Acartia tonsa Dana, 1849
- Acartia tranteri Bradford, 1976
- Acartia tropica Ueda & Hiromi, 1987
- Acartia tsuensis ItoTak, 1956
- Acartia tumida Willey, 1920

== Reproductive and life cycle ==
Female Acartia release eggs freely in the water. Nauplii hatch and undergo six distinct life stages to become copepodites and then undergo another six life stages to become fully mature copepods.

Some species of Acartia are known to exhibit a diapause, a resting period when the species is dormant, as a part of their life cycle. These species produce "resting eggs" when environmental conditions are unfavorable for the development and growth of nauplii. Individual females can switch between producing resting eggs and subitaneous eggs (eggs that hatch immediately) as environmental conditions change. Resting eggs accumulate in the sediment and hatch when conditions are optimal. Production of resting eggs is driven by water temperature variations. Some species (A. hudsonica) produce resting eggs when water temperatures rise above a certain threshold, while others (A. tonsa, A. califoriensis) have been observed to produce resting eggs when water temperatures fall below a certain threshold. Hatching and development of the species occur when the water cools (A. hudonica) or warms (A. tonsa, A. califoriensis). Additionally, A. califoriensis is known to be adapted to anomalous water temperature variations. Hatching is only followed by a period of steady water temperatures in the favorable range. This ensures that a generation of the species is not killed off by a momentary warming followed again by colder temperatures.

== Diet ==
Acartia primarily feed on phytoplankton and are also known to consume rotifers, ciliates, and their own eggs and nauplii.

Acartia feeding patterns are asymptotic relative to the abundance of food. When food is widely abundant Acartia approach a maximum food intake. When there is less food available, feeding adjusts to rates that correlate with food availability.

== Behaviour ==
In a study of A. tonsa in the Narragansett Bay the species was found to exhibit a diel feeding pattern, that is, a night feeding pattern. The diel feeding cycle was tested under a variety of light conditions and was found to be endogenous, not related to light availability, but persistent regardless of whether the copepods were subjected to light or dark. This feeding pattern is only known to be disrupted at extremely low food levels, implying that either "food limitation has over-ridden other factors governing diel feeding rhythms and induced continuous feeding, or that a synchronized population-wide feeding rhythm has given way to intermittent, asynchronous feeding among individuals."

Acartia are also known to exhibit a diel vertical migration pattern, swimming to depths during the day and rising to surface waters at night. The diel vertical migration of A. tonsa was seen to be effected by light exposure: when exposed to continuous light the copepods did not migrate to the surface.

Both diel patterns are thought to be primarily adaptive behavior to avoid visual predators. The mechanism of the diel vertical migration of Acartia has been explored further to solve the question of whether the copepods react to chemical signals indicating the presence of predators, physical stimuli resulting from the movement of predator fish in the water, or visual cues based on the changing light modified by a much larger predator. In a study of A. hudsonica, the chemical response was ruled out. Additionally, other studies of Acartia (A. longiremis, A. grani and A. discandata) were found to have less chemoreceptors and more mechanoreceptive sensory hairs than other marine copepods, suggesting that diel feeding and migration patterns in Arcatia are primarily driven by physical and visual cues.
