= Pseudocalanus =

Scientific classification
- Kingdom: Animalia
- Phylum: Arthropoda
- Clade: Pancrustacea
- Class: Copepoda
- Order: Calanoida
- Family: Clausocalanidae
- Genus: Pseudocalanus; Boeck, 1873

Type species
- Pseudocalanus elongatus (Brady, 1865)

Synonyms
- Clausia Boeck, 1865; Lucullus Giesbrecht, 1881; Streptocalanus Brady, 1918

Genus of crustaceans

Pseudocalanus is a genus of copepods in the family Clausocalanidae. The World Register of Marine Species lists the following species:

- Pseudocalanus acuspes (Giesbrecht, 1881)
- Pseudocalanus elongatus (Brady, 1865)
- Pseudocalanus mimus Frost, 1989
- Pseudocalanus minutus (Krøyer, 1845)
- Pseudocalanus moultoni Frost, 1989
- Pseudocalanus newmani Frost, 1989

Additionally, Pseudocalanus clausii (Boeck, 1865) is uncertain nomen dubium. Pseudocalanus feildeni Norman, 1878 and Pseudocalanus major Sars G.O., 1900 are considered species inquirenda. Pseudocalanus minor often appears in checklists, without an authority.
