= Hyperbionycidae =

Scientific classification
- Kingdom: Animalia
- Phylum: Arthropoda
- Class: Copepoda
- Order: Calanoida
- Family: Hyperbionycidae; Ohtsuka, Roe & Boxshall, 1993

Family of crustaceans

Hyperbionycidae is a family of crustaceans belonging to the order Calanoida.

Genera:

- Hyperbionyx Ohtsuka, Roe & Boxshall, 1993
- Lamiantennula Markhaseva & Schulz, 2006
