= Pseudocyclopiidae =

Scientific classification
- Kingdom: Animalia
- Phylum: Arthropoda
- Clade: Pancrustacea
- Class: Copepoda
- Order: Calanoida
- Family: Pseudocyclopiidae; Sars, 1902

Family of crustaceans

Pseudocyclopiidae is a family of copepods, comprising the following genera:

- Frigocalanus Schulz, 1996
- Paracyclopia Fosshagen, 1985
- Pseudocyclopia T. Scott, 1892
- Stygocyclopia Jaume & Boxshall, 1995
- Thompsonopia Jaume, Fosshagen & Iliffe, 1999
