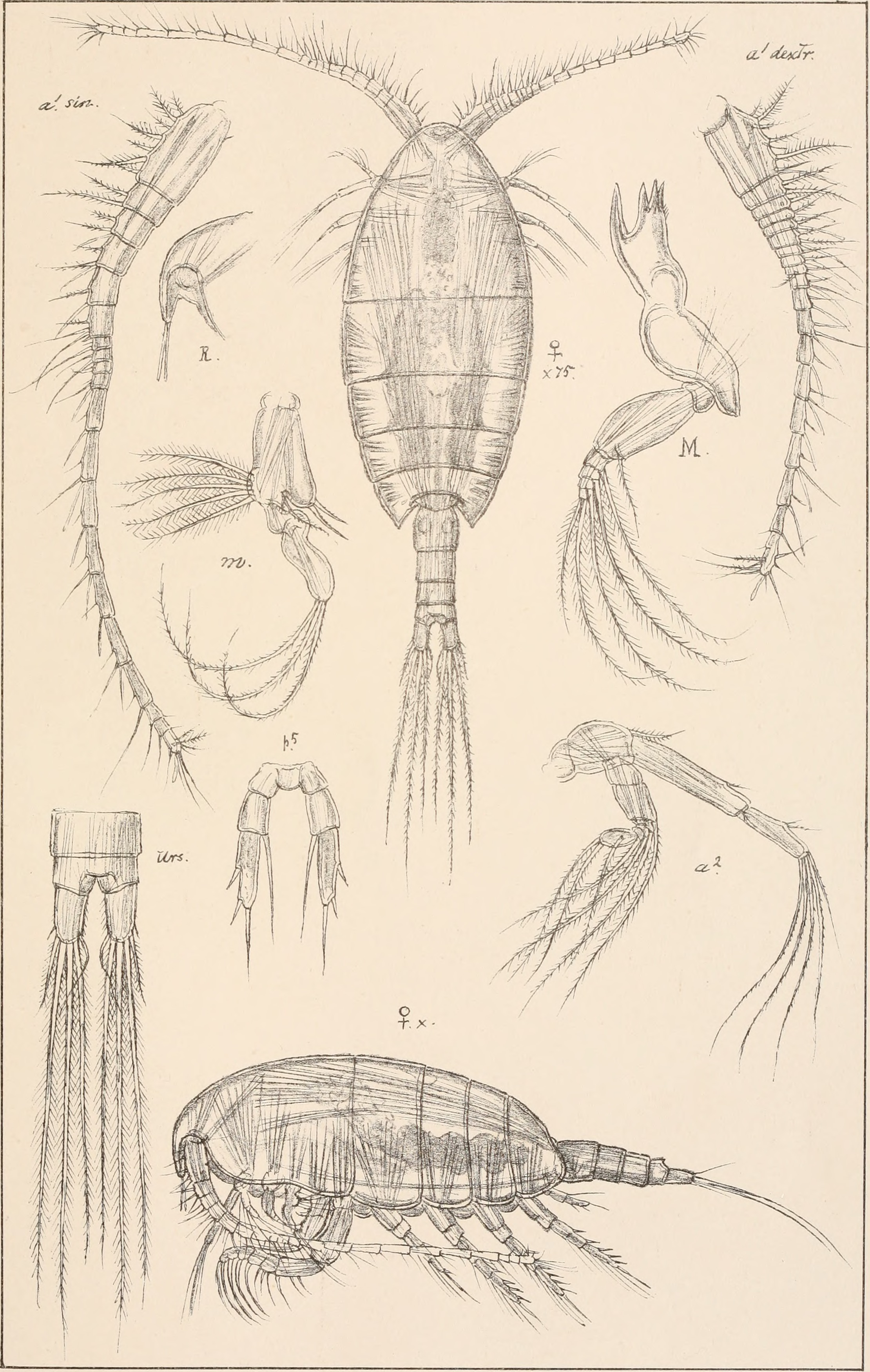
- A picture of Arietellidae Copepoda Calanoida

Scientific classification
- Domain: Eukaryota
- Kingdom: Animalia
- Phylum: Arthropoda
- Class: Copepoda
- Order: Calanoida
- Family: Arietellidae; Sars G.O., 1902

= Arietellidae =

Family of crustaceans

Arietellidae is a family of copepods belonging to the order Calanoida.

== Genera ==
The family contains the following genera:

- Arietellus Giesbrecht, 1893
- Campaneria Ohtsuka, Boxshall & Roe, 1994
- Crassarietellus Ohtsuka, Boxshall & Roe, 1994
- Griceus Ferrari F.D. & Markhaseva, 2000
- Metacalanalis Ohtsuka, Nishida & Machida, 2005
- Metacalanus Cleve, 1901
- Paramisophria Scott T., 1897
- Paraugaptiloides Ohtsuka, Boxshall & Roe, 1994
- Paraugaptilus Wolfenden, 1904
- Pilarella Alvarez, 1985
- Protoparamisophria Ohtsuka, Nishida & Machida, 2005
- Rhapidophorus Edwards, 1891
- Sarsarietellus Campaner, 1984
- Scutogerulus Bradford, 1969
