= Fosshageniidae =

Scientific classification
- Domain: Eukaryota
- Kingdom: Animalia
- Phylum: Arthropoda
- Class: Copepoda
- Order: Calanoida
- Family: Fosshageniidae

Family of crustaceans

Fosshageniidae is a family of crustaceans belonging to the order Calanoida.

Genera:

- Fosshagenia Suárez-Morales & Iliffe, 1996
- Temoropia Scott, 1894
