= Robertus pumilus =

Scientific classification
- Domain: Eukaryota
- Kingdom: Animalia
- Phylum: Arthropoda
- Subphylum: Chelicerata
- Class: Arachnida
- Order: Araneae
- Infraorder: Araneomorphae
- Family: Theridiidae
- Genus: Robertus
- Species: R. pumilus

Binomial name
- Robertus pumilus (Emerton, 1909)

Species of spider

Robertus pumilus is a species of cobweb spider in the family Theridiidae. It is found in the United States.
