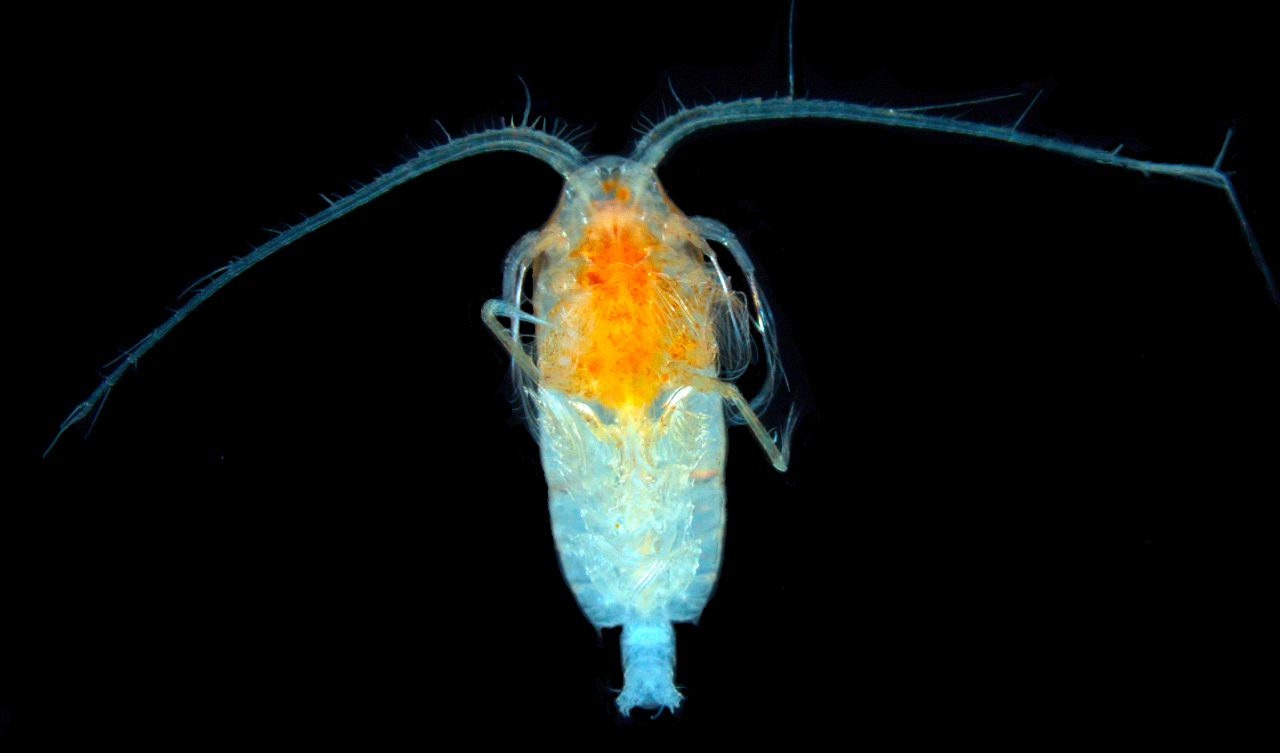

Scientific classification
- Domain: Eukaryota
- Kingdom: Animalia
- Phylum: Arthropoda
- Class: Copepoda
- Order: Calanoida
- Family: Aetideidae; Giesbrecht, 1892

= Aetideidae =

Family of crustaceans

Aetideidae is a family of copepods belonging to the order Calanoida.

== Genera ==
The family contains the following genera:

- Aetideopsis Sars G.O., 1903
- Aetideus Brady, 1883
- Azygokeras Koeller & Littlepage, 1976
- Batheuchaeta Brodsky, 1950
- Bradyetes Farran, 1905
- Bradyidius Giesbrecht, 1897
- Chiridiella Sars G.O., 1907
- Chiridius Giesbrecht, 1893
- Chirundina Giesbrecht, 1895
- Chirundinella Tanaka, 1957
- Comantenna Wilson C.B., 1924
- Crassantenna Bradford, 1969
- Euchirella Giesbrecht, 1888
- Farrania Sars G.O., 1920
- Gaetanus Giesbrecht, 1888
- Gaidiopsis Scott A., 1909
- Jaschnovia Markhaseva, 1980
- Lutamator Bradford, 1969
- Mesocomantenna Alvarez, 1986
- Mesogaidius Wolfenden, 1911
- Paivella Vervoort, 1965
- Parabradyidius Schulz & Markhaseva, 2000
- Paracomantenna Campaner, 1978
- Prolutamator Markhaseva & Schulz, 2008
- Pseudeuchaeta Sars G.O., 1905
- Pseudochirella Sars G.O., 1920
- Pseudoothrix Brady, 1918
- Pseudotharybis Scott T., 1909
- Pterochirella Schulz, 1990
- Senecella Juday, 1923
- Sursamucro Bradford, 1969
- Undeuchaeta Giesbrecht, 1888
- Valdiviella Steuer, 1904
