= Scolecitrichidae =

Scientific classification
- Kingdom: Animalia
- Phylum: Arthropoda
- Class: Copepoda
- Order: Calanoida
- Family: Scolecitrichidae

Synonyms
- Scolecithricidae; Scolecitricidae

Family of crustaceans

Scolecitrichidae is a family of copepods belonging to the order Calanoida.

== Genera ==
Genera:

- Amallothrix Sars, 1925
- Archescolecithrix Vyshkvartzeva, 1989
- Bertalda
