= Sulcanus =

Scientific classification
- Domain: Eukaryota
- Kingdom: Animalia
- Phylum: Arthropoda
- Class: Copepoda
- Order: Calanoida
- Family: Sulcanidae; Nicholls, 1945
- Genus: Sulcanus; Nicholls, 1945
- Species: S. conflictus

Binomial name
- Sulcanus conflictus Nicholls, 1945

Genus of crustaceans

Sulcanus is a monotypic genus of crustaceans belonging to the monotypic family Sulcanidae. The only species is Sulcanus conflictus.

The species is found in Australia and New Zealand.
