= Louis Fage =

French marine biologist and arachnologist

- Born: July 30, 1883; Limoges, France
- Died: 1964; Dijon, France
- Education: Sorbonne (PhD)
- Known for: carcinology (study of crustaceans), arachnology (study of spiders) and speleology (study of caves)
- Scientific career
- Fields: zoology
- Workplaces: Laboratoire de biologie marine; Muséum national d'histoire naturelle

Louis Fage (30 September 1883, in Limoges – 1964, in Dijon), also known as Jean-Louis Fage and Baptiste Louis Fage, was a French marine biologist and arachnologist.

A native of Limoges, he studied biology at the Sorbonne and in the laboratory at Saint-Vaast-la-Hougue. In 1906 he obtained his doctorate with a thesis on the nephridia of polychaetes. For the next fourteen years he served as a naturalist at the Laboratoire de biologie marine in Banyuls-sur-Mer. From 1920 he worked in the zoology department at the Muséum national d'histoire naturelle in Paris, where in 1938 he succeeded Charles Joseph Gravier (1865–1937) as professor and director of the department of zoology (worms and crustaceans).

Fage made contributions in the fields of carcinology (study of crustaceans), arachnology and speleology. In 1945 he was a founding member of the Commission de spéléologie (being part of the Centre national de la recherche scientifique – CNRS). He also performed research of Ellobiopsis (genus of parasitic protozoa). A genus of ammonites named Fagesia is named after him.

== Written works ==
With Édouard Chevreux (1846–1931) he co-authored the section on "Amphipodes" for the Faune de France (1924). Other writings by Fage include:

- Recherches sur les organes segmentaires des annélides polychétes, 1906
- Les scorpions de Madagascar, 1929
- Cumacés et leptostracés provenant des campagnes scientifiques de S.A.S. le Prince Albert Ier de Monaco, 1929
- Mysidacea : Lophogastrida, I, (1941) and Mysidacea : Lophogastrida, II (1942).
- L'Importance de la vie symbiotique dans la biologie des coraux constructeurs de récifs, 1950
- Oxycephalidae : amphipodes pelagiques, 1960.

== Spider names ==
The World Spider Catalog lists 12 genera of spiders with Fage as the author or co-author of the genus name and 158 species of spiders with Fage as the author or co-author of the accepted species name or synonym. The specific name fagei appears in 41 names of spider species.

== See also ==
- French Federation of Speleology
