= Nullosetigeridae =

Scientific classification
- Kingdom: Animalia
- Phylum: Arthropoda
- Class: Copepoda
- Order: Calanoida
- Family: Nullosetigeridae

Synonyms
- Phyllopodidae

Family of crustaceans

Nullosetigeridae is a family of copepods belonging to the order Calanoida. The family contains the genus Nullosetigera, which includes the species N. auctiseta, N. bidentata, N. impar, N. helgae, and N. mutata. Each mentioned species has a unique shape, which helps differentiate between them. These differences were found in the segmentation pattern of the antennula, maxillule, makilliped, and legs 4 and 5.

Genera:

- Nullosetigera Soh, Ohtsuka, Imabayashi & Suh, 1999
