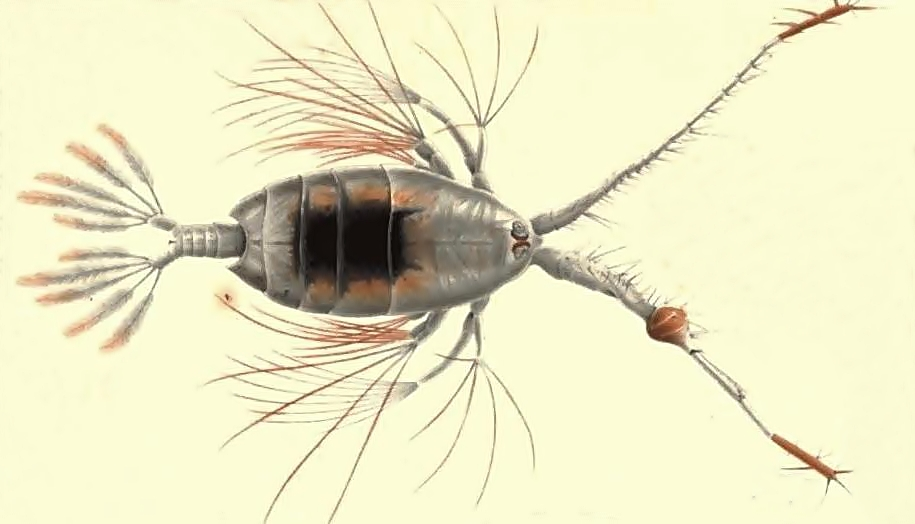
- Euchaeta marina

Scientific classification
- Kingdom: Animalia
- Phylum: Arthropoda
- Clade: Pancrustacea
- Class: Copepoda
- Order: Calanoida
- Family: Euchaetidae; Giesbrecht, 1893

Genera
- Euchaeta Philippi, 1843; Paraeuchaeta Scott, 1909

= Euchaetidae =

Family of crustaceans

Euchaetidae is a family of marine copepods. The family is cosmopolitan and occurs in all the oceans, including the Southern and Arctic Oceans. Euchaetidae are medium to large-sized copepods.

== Genera ==
There are two genera with in total 114 species:

- Euchaeta Philippi, 1843 – 16 species
- Paraeuchaeta Scott, 1909 – 98 species

== Ecology ==
Euchaeta are mostly epipelagic whereas Paraeuchaeta are mostly bathypelagic. Where more than one species occurs, congeneric species (or life stages of a single species, as observed for Paraeuchaeta antarctica) may partition the water column, whereas species representing different genera that occur at similar depths differ in dietary preferences.

Paraeuchaeta can be important predators of fish larvae. Their mode of predation is "drift and wait". The dominant euchaetid in the Southern Ocean is Paraeuchaeta antarctica. It is a dominant predator there, and its fatty acid profile suggests that it mostly preys upon herbivorous calanid copepods. In the Weddell Sea, it contributes as much as 11–18% to total mesozooplankton biomass.

== Life cycle ==
Paraeuchaeta antarctica has a one-year life-cycle around the Kerguelen Islands.
