= Robertus riparius =

Scientific classification
- Domain: Eukaryota
- Kingdom: Animalia
- Phylum: Arthropoda
- Subphylum: Chelicerata
- Class: Arachnida
- Order: Araneae
- Infraorder: Araneomorphae
- Family: Theridiidae
- Genus: Robertus
- Species: R. riparius

Binomial name
- Robertus riparius (Keyserling, 1886)

Species of spider

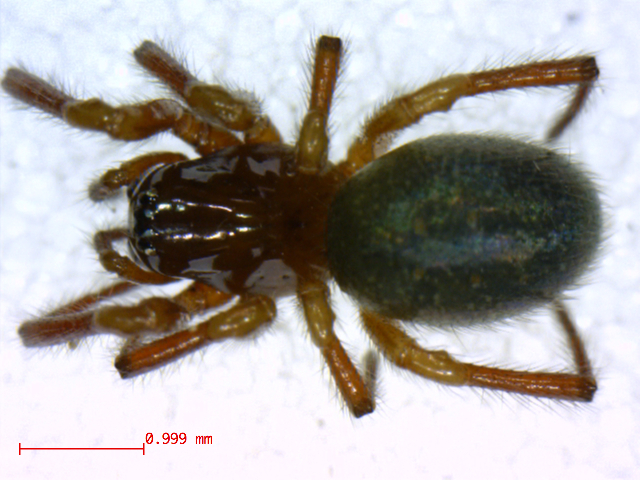

Robertus riparius is a species of cobweb spider in the family Theridiidae. It is found in the United States and Canada.
