= Parkius =

Scientific classification
- Domain: Eukaryota
- Kingdom: Animalia
- Phylum: Arthropoda
- Class: Copepoda
- Order: Calanoida
- Family: Parkiidae; Ferrari & Markhaseva, 1996
- Genus: Parkius; Ferrari & Markhaseva, 1996
- Species: P. karenwishnerae

Binomial name
- Parkius karenwishnerae Ferrari & Markhaseva, 1996

Genus of crustaceans

Parkius is a monotypic genus of crustaceans belonging to the monotypic family Parkiidae. The only species is Parkius karenwishnerae.

The species is found in Atlantic and Pacific Ocean.
