= Robertus vigerens =

Scientific classification
- Kingdom: Animalia
- Phylum: Arthropoda
- Subphylum: Chelicerata
- Class: Arachnida
- Order: Araneae
- Infraorder: Araneomorphae
- Family: Theridiidae
- Genus: Robertus
- Species: R. vigerens

Binomial name
- Robertus vigerens (Chamberlin & Ivie, 1933)

Species of spider

Robertus vigerens is a species of cobweb spider in the family Theridiidae. It is found in the United States and Canada.
