= Bathypontiidae =

Scientific classification
- Domain: Eukaryota
- Kingdom: Animalia
- Phylum: Arthropoda
- Class: Copepoda
- Order: Calanoida
- Family: Bathypontiidae; Brodsky, 1950

Family of crustaceans

Bathypontiidae is a family of copepods belonging to the order Calanoida.

Genera:

- Alloiopodus Bradford, 1969
- Temorites Sars, 1900
- Temoropsis Wolfenden, 1911
- Zenkevitchiella Brodsky, 1955
