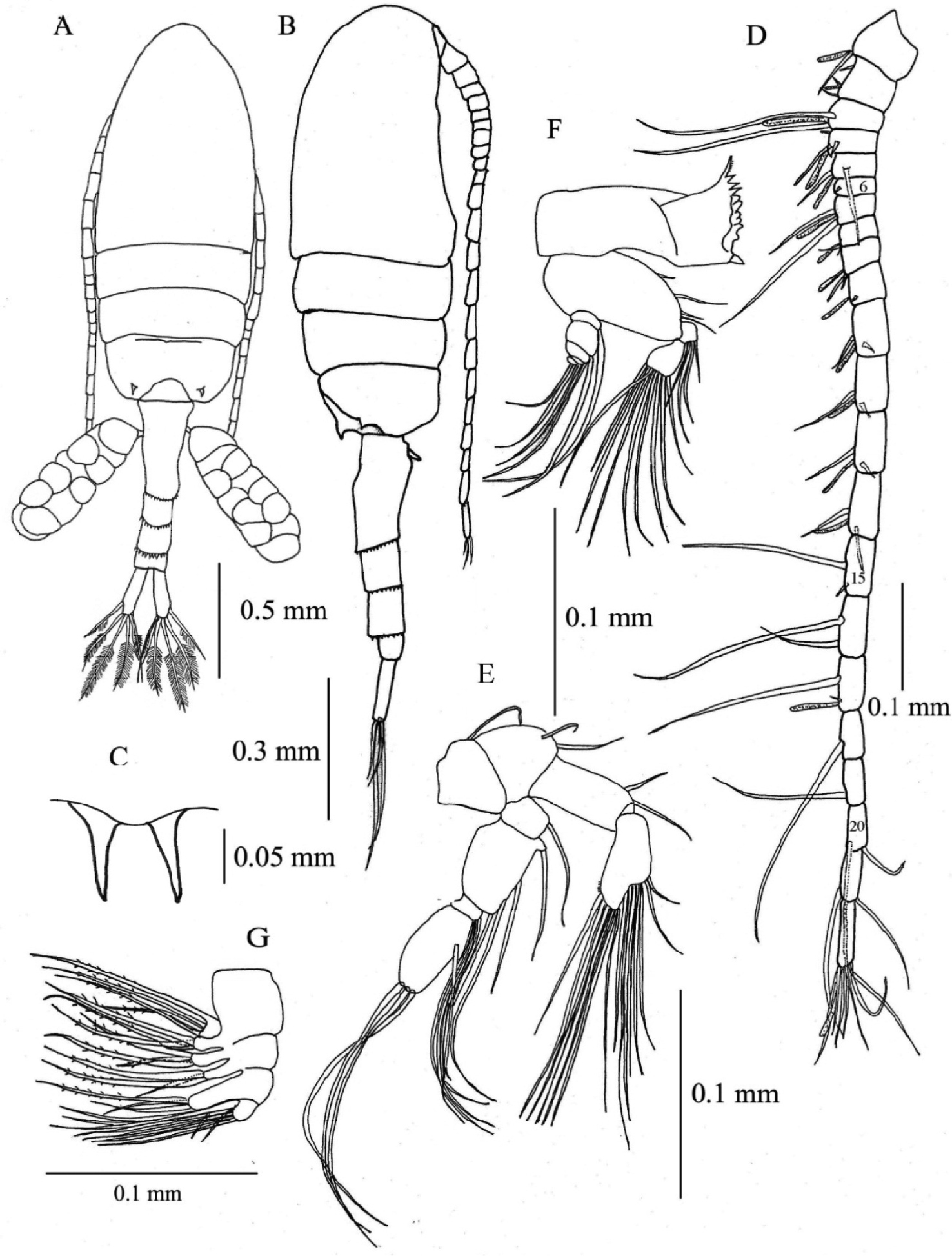

Scientific classification
- Domain: Eukaryota
- Kingdom: Animalia
- Phylum: Arthropoda
- Class: Copepoda
- Order: Calanoida
- Family: Pseudodiaptomidae; Sars G.O., 1902

= Pseudodiaptomidae =

Family of crustaceans

Pseudodiaptomidae is a family of crustaceans belonging to the order Calanoida.

Genera:

- Archidiaptomus Madhupratap & Haridas, 1978
- Calanipeda Krichagin, 1873
- Parapoppella Sars, 2020
- Pseudodiaptomus Herrick, 1884
