= Tortanidae =

Scientific classification
- Kingdom: Animalia
- Phylum: Arthropoda
- Clade: Pancrustacea
- Class: Copepoda
- Order: Calanoida
- Family: Tortanidae; Sars G.O., 1902

Genus
- Tortanus

Family of crustaceans

Tortanidae is a family of copepods within the order Calanoida. The tropicus group of this species can be found in the tropical and subtropical waters of Southeast Asia. The groups are distinguishable by their genitals and their tails.
