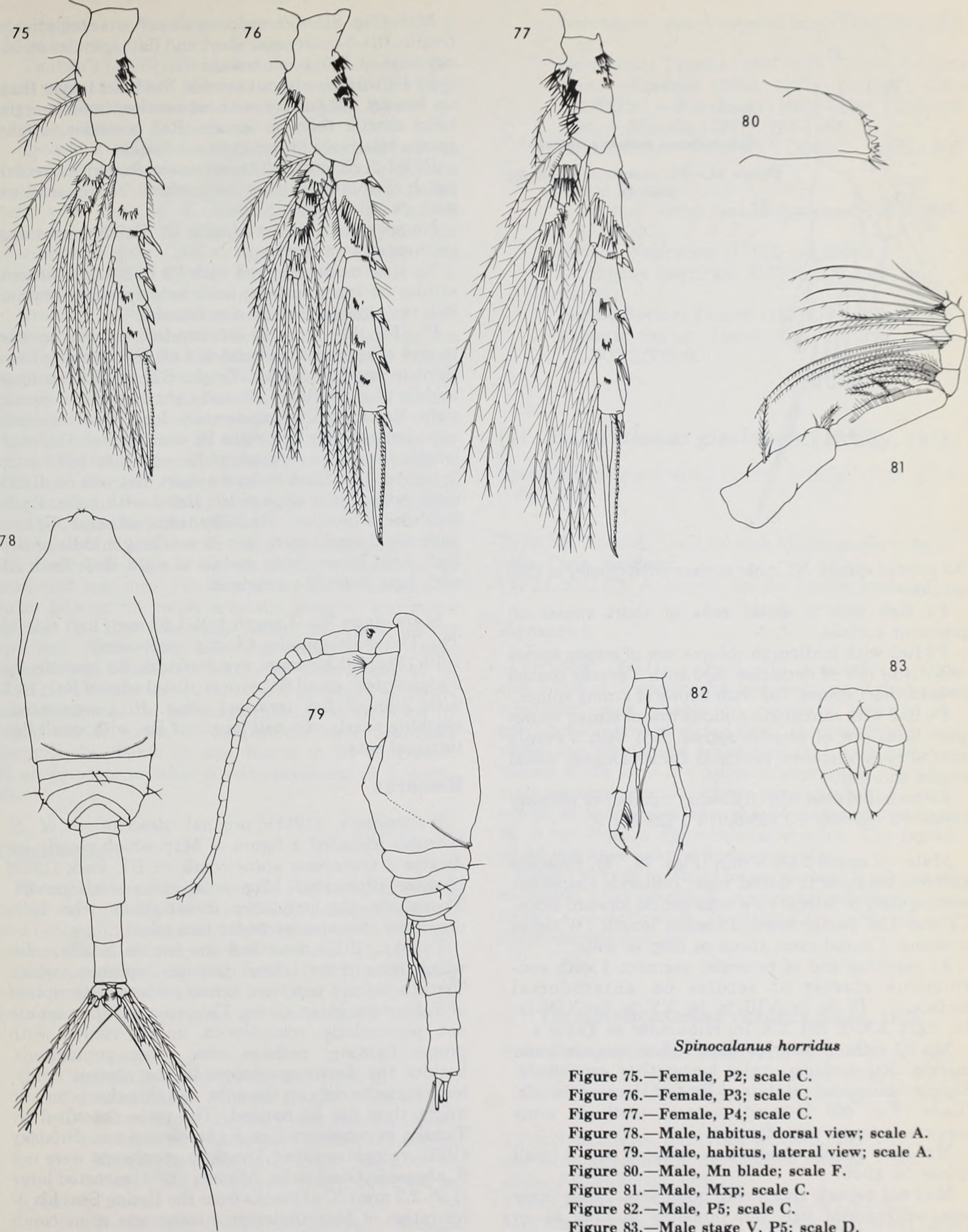

Scientific classification
- Domain: Eukaryota
- Kingdom: Animalia
- Phylum: Arthropoda
- Class: Copepoda
- Order: Calanoida
- Family: Spinocalanidae

= Spinocalanidae =

Family of crustaceans

Spinocalanidae is a family of copepods belonging to the order Calanoida.

== Genera ==
Genera:

- Arctokonstantius
- Damkaeria Fosshagen, 1983
- Foxtonia Hulsemann & Grice, 1963
