= Lucicutiidae =

Scientific classification
- Domain: Eukaryota
- Kingdom: Animalia
- Phylum: Arthropoda
- Class: Copepoda
- Order: Calanoida
- Family: Lucicutiidae

Family of crustaceans

Lucicutiidae is a family of copepods belonging to the order Calanoida.

Genera:

- Lucicutia Giesbrecht, 1898
