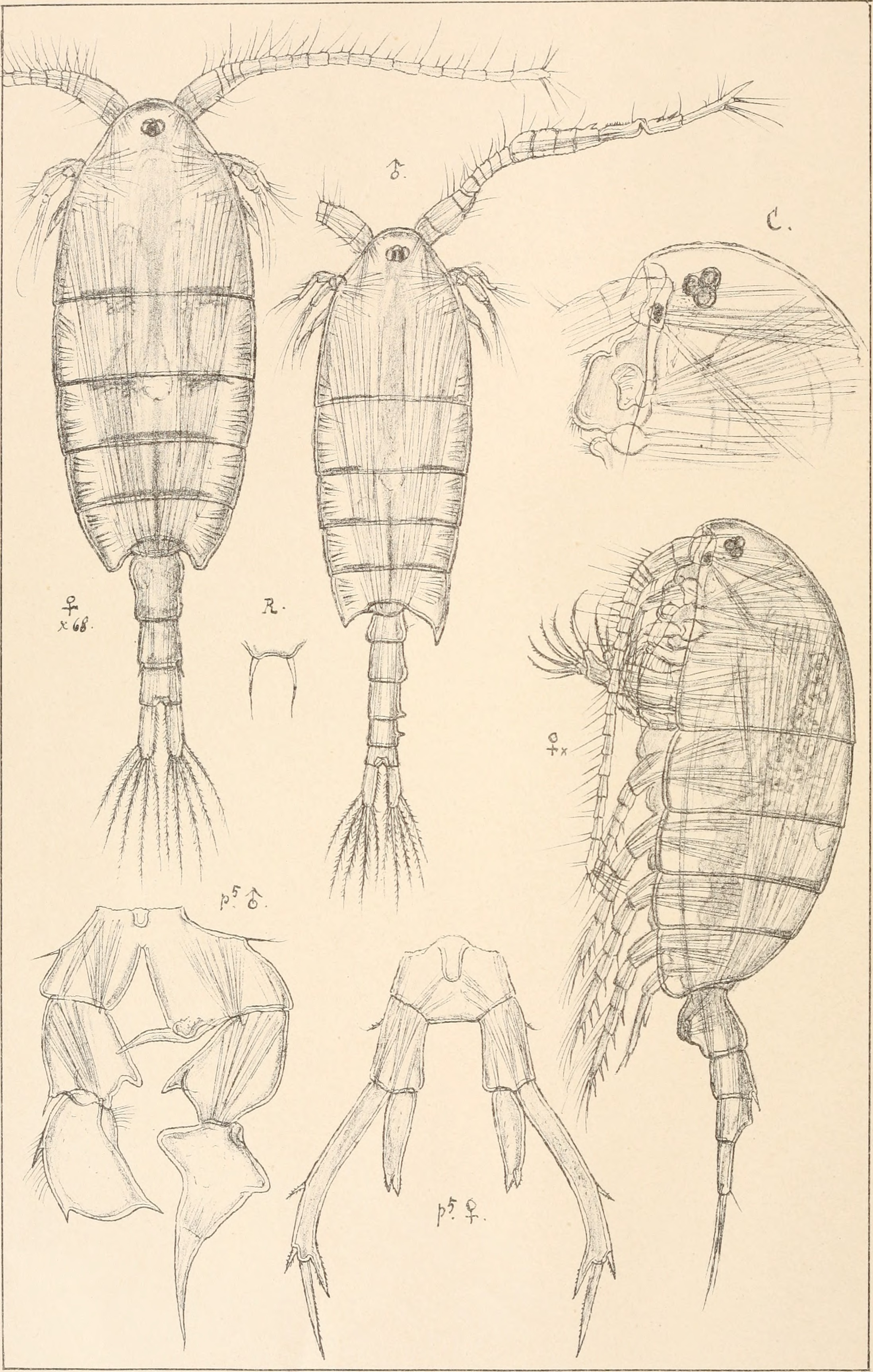

Scientific classification
- Domain: Eukaryota
- Kingdom: Animalia
- Phylum: Arthropoda
- Class: Copepoda
- Order: Calanoida
- Family: Parapontellidae

= Parapontellidae =

Family of crustaceans

Parapontellidae is a family of copepods belonging to the order Calanoida.

Genera:

- Neopontella Scott, 1909
- Parapontella Brady, 1878
