= Discoidae =

Scientific classification
- Domain: Eukaryota
- Kingdom: Animalia
- Phylum: Arthropoda
- Class: Copepoda
- Order: Calanoida
- Family: Discoidae

Family of crustaceans

Discoidae is a family of crustaceans belonging to the order Calanoida.

Genera:

- Disco Grice & Hulsemann, 1965
- Paradisco Gordeeva, 1975
- Pertsovius Andronov & Kosobokova, 2011
- Prodisco Gordeeva, 1975
