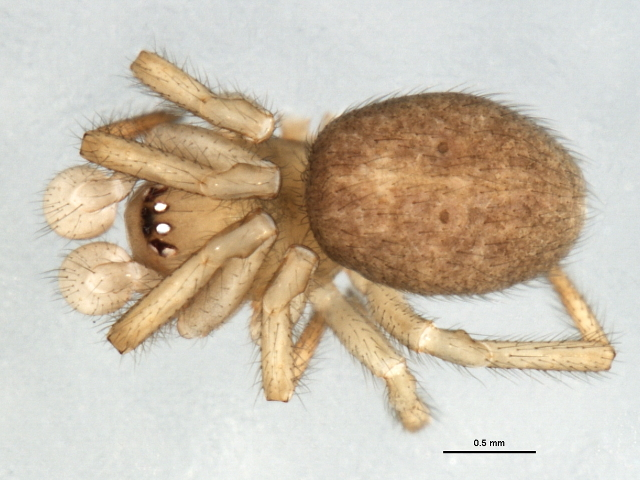
- R. banksi
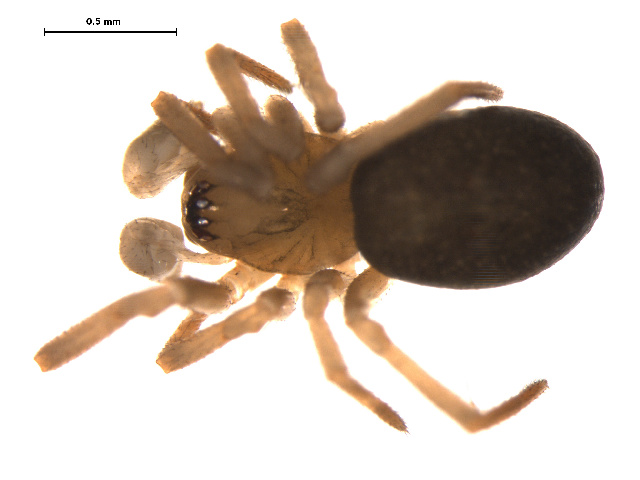
- R. fuscus

Scientific classification
- Kingdom: Animalia
- Phylum: Arthropoda
- Subphylum: Chelicerata
- Class: Arachnida
- Order: Araneae
- Infraorder: Araneomorphae
- Family: Theridiidae
- Genus: Robertus; O. Pickard-Cambridge, 1879

Type species
- R. neglectus (O. Pickard-Cambridge, 1871)

Species
- 47, see text

Synonyms
- Ctenium Menge, 1871; Garritus Chamberlin & Ivie, 1933

= Robertus (spider) =

Genus of spiders

Robertus is a genus of comb-footed spiders that was first described by Octavius Pickard-Cambridge in 1879. It is considered a senior synonym of Garritus.

== Species ==
As of September 2019 it contains forty-seven species, found in Europe, Asia, North America, the Congo, and on Greenland:

- Robertus alpinus Dresco, 1959 – Italy
- Robertus arcticus (Chamberlin & Ivie, 1947) – USA (Alaska)
- Robertus arundineti (O. Pickard-Cambridge, 1871) – Europe, Turkey, Caucasus, Russia (Europe to South Siberia), Kazakhstan, Central Asia, China
- Robertus banksi (Kaston, 1946) – USA, Canada
- Robertus borealis (Kaston, 1946) – USA, Canada
- Robertus brachati Wunderlich, 2011 – Turkey
- Robertus calidus Knoflach, 1995 – Congo
- Robertus cantabricus Fage, 1931 – Spain
- Robertus cardesensis Dresco, 1959 – Spain
- Robertus crosbyi (Kaston, 1946) – USA, Canada
- Robertus emeishanensis Zhu, 1998 – China
- Robertus eremophilus Chamberlin, 1928 – USA
- Robertus floridensis (Kaston, 1946) – USA
- Robertus frivaldszkyi (Chyzer, 1894) – Central and south-eastern Europe
- Robertus frontatus (Banks, 1892) – USA, Canada
- Robertus fuscus (Emerton, 1894) – USA, Canada, Greenland
- Robertus golovatchi Eskov, 1987 – Georgia
- Robertus heydemanni Wiehle, 1965 – Sweden, Germany, Austria, Italy, Romania, Ukraine, Russia (Europe to West Siberia), Kazakhstan
- Robertus insignis O. Pickard-Cambridge, 1908 – Europe
- Robertus kastoni Eskov, 1987 – Russia (Middle Siberia to Russian Far East), Japan
- Robertus kuehnae Bauchhenss & Uhlenhaut, 1993 – Belgium, Switzerland, Germany, Austria
- Robertus laticeps (Keyserling, 1884) – USA
- Robertus lividus (Blackwall, 1836) – USA (Alaska), Europe, Caucasus, Russia (Europe to Far East), Iran
- Robertus longipalpus (Kaston, 1946) – USA, Canada
- Robertus lyrifer Holm, 1939 – Iceland, Scandinavia, Austria, Russia (Europe to Far East), Canada
- Robertus mazaurici (Simon, 1901) – France
- Robertus mediterraneus Eskov, 1987 – Mediterranean, Switzerland, Austria, Eastern Europe, Caucasus
- Robertus monticola Simon, 1914 – France
- Robertus naejangensis Seo, 2005 – Korea
- Robertus neglectus (O. Pickard-Cambridge, 1871) (type) – Europe, Russia (Europe to South Siberia), Kazakhstan
- Robertus nipponicus Yoshida, 1995 – Japan
- Robertus nojimai Yoshida, 2002 – Japan
- Robertus ogatai Yoshida, 1995 – Japan
- Robertus peregrinus Yang, Irfan & Peng, 2019 – China
- Robertus potanini Schenkel, 1963 – China
- Robertus pumilus (Emerton, 1909) – USA
- Robertus riparius (Keyserling, 1886) – USA, Canada
- Robertus saitoi Yoshida, 1995 – Japan
- Robertus scoticus Jackson, 1914 – Europe, Caucasus, Russia (Europe to Middle Siberia)
- Robertus sibiricus Eskov, 1987 – Russia (Middle Siberia to Far East), Japan
- Robertus similis (Kaston, 1946) – USA
- Robertus spinifer (Emerton, 1909) – USA
- Robertus subtilis Seo, 2015 – Korea
- Robertus truncorum (L. Koch, 1872) – France to Ukraine
- Robertus ungulatus Vogelsanger, 1944 – Europe, Russia (South Siberia to Far East), China
- Robertus ussuricus Eskov, 1987 – Russia (Far East)
- Robertus vigerens (Chamberlin & Ivie, 1933) – USA, Canada

In synonymy:

- R. asper (O. Pickard-Cambridge, 1871) = Robertus neglectus (O. Pickard-Cambridge, 1871)
- R. exortus (Drensky, 1929, T from Agroeca) = Robertus frivaldszkyi (Chyzer, 1894)
- R. fuscus (Emerton, 1911) = Robertus fuscus (Emerton, 1894)
- R. grasshoffi Wunderlich, 1973 = Robertus neglectus (O. Pickard-Cambridge, 1871)
- R. palustris (Banks, 1892) = Robertus laticeps (Keyserling, 1884)
- R. paradoxus Miller, 1967 = Robertus ungulatus Vogelsanger, 1944
- R. terrestris (Emerton, 1913) = Robertus frontatus (Banks, 1892)
- R. umbilicatus Denis, 1961 = Robertus mazaurici (Simon, 1901)
