= Ryocalanidae =

Scientific classification
- Domain: Eukaryota
- Kingdom: Animalia
- Phylum: Arthropoda
- Class: Copepoda
- Order: Calanoida
- Family: Ryocalanidae

Family of crustaceans

Ryocalanidae is a family of crustaceans belonging to the order Calanoida.

Genera:

- Ryocalanus Tanaka, 1956
- Yrocalanus Renz, Markhaseva & Schulz, 2012
