= Mesaiokeras =

Scientific classification
- Domain: Eukaryota
- Kingdom: Animalia
- Phylum: Arthropoda
- Class: Copepoda
- Order: Calanoida
- Family: Mesaiokeratidae; Matthews, 1961
- Genus: Mesaiokeras; Matthews, 1961

Genus of crustaceans

Mesaiokeras is a genus of crustaceans belonging to the monotypic family Mesaiokeratidae.

The species of this genus are found in Southern Europe.

Species:

- Mesaiokeras heptneri Andronov, 1973
- Mesaiokeras hurei Kršinic, 2003
- Mesaiokeras kaufmanni Fosshagen, 1978
- Mesaiokeras marocanus Andronov, 1995
- Mesaiokeras mikhailini Andronov, 1995
- Mesaiokeras nanseni Matthews, 1961
- Mesaiokeras semiplenus Andronov, 1973
- Mesaiokeras spitsbergensis Schulz & Kwasniewski, 2004
- Mesaiokeras tantillus Andronov, 1973
