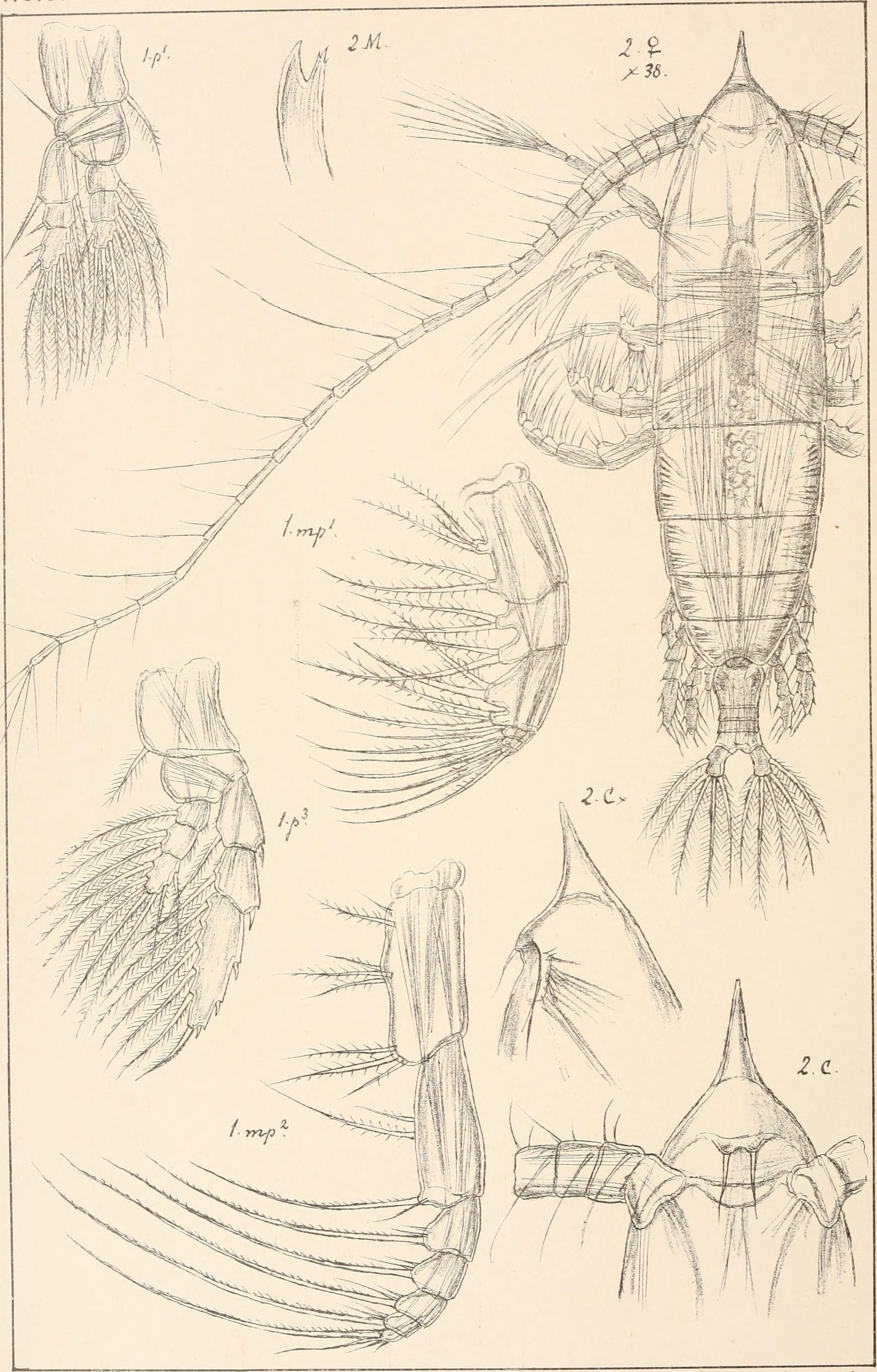

Scientific classification
- Domain: Eukaryota
- Kingdom: Animalia
- Phylum: Arthropoda
- Class: Copepoda
- Order: Calanoida
- Family: Heterorhabdidae

= Heterorhabdidae =

Family of crustaceans

Heterorhabdidae is a family of copepods belonging to the order Calanoida.

Genera:

- Disseta Giesbrecht, 1889
- Hemirhabdus Wolfenden, 1911
- Heterohabdus
- Heterorhabdus Giesbrecht, 1898
- Heterostylites Sars, 1920
- Mesorhabdus Sars, 1905
- Microdisseta Heptner, 1972
- Neorhabdus Heptner, 1972
- Paraheterorhabdus Brodsky, 1950
