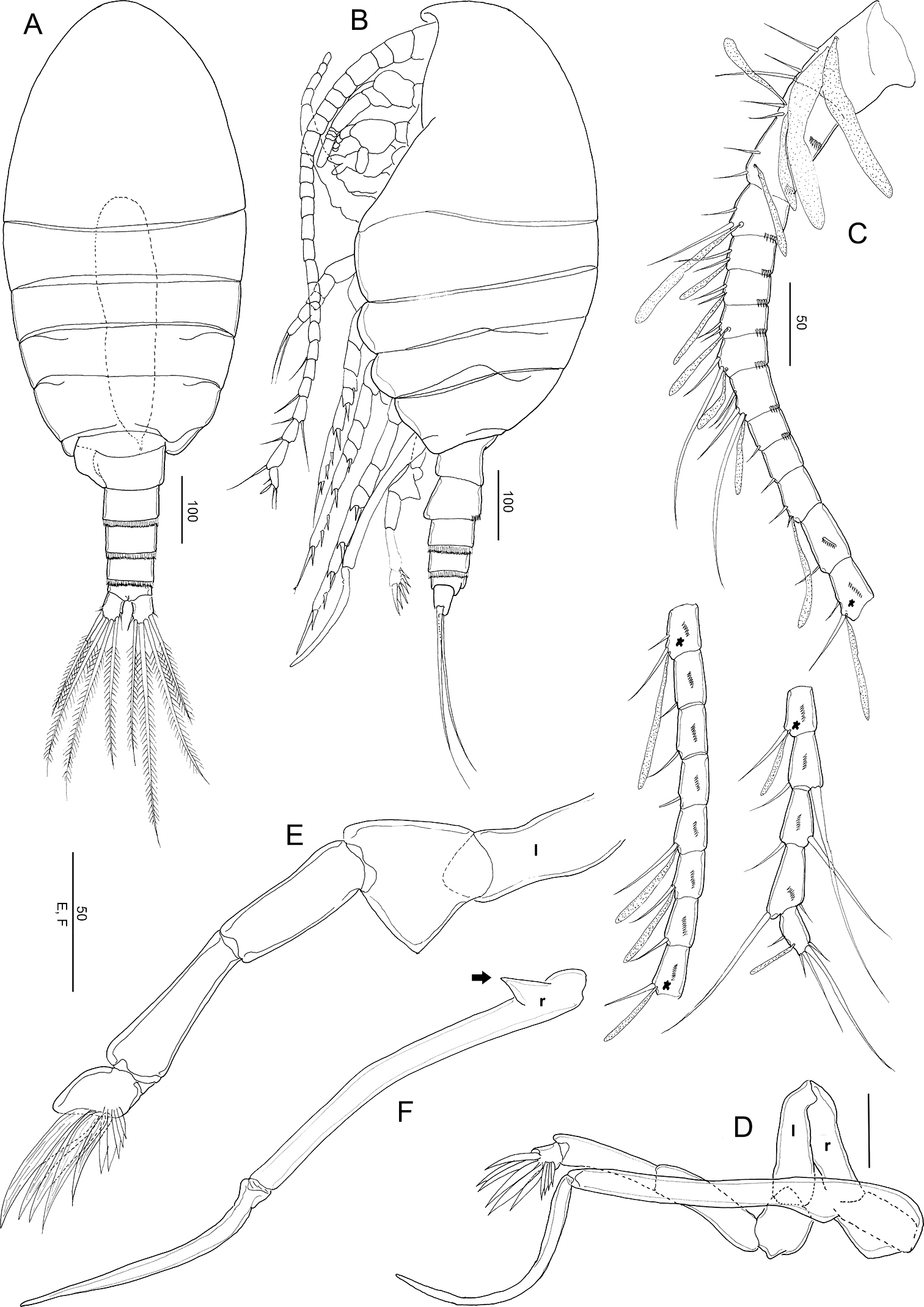
- Stephos jejuensis

Scientific classification
- Kingdom: Animalia
- Phylum: Arthropoda
- Class: Copepoda
- Order: Calanoida
- Family: Stephidae

= Stephidae =

Family of crustaceans

Stephidae is a family of copepods belonging to the order Calanoida.

Genera:

- Miostephos Bowman, 1976
- Parastephos Sars, 1902
- Speleohvarella Kršinic, 2005
- Stephos Scott, 1892
