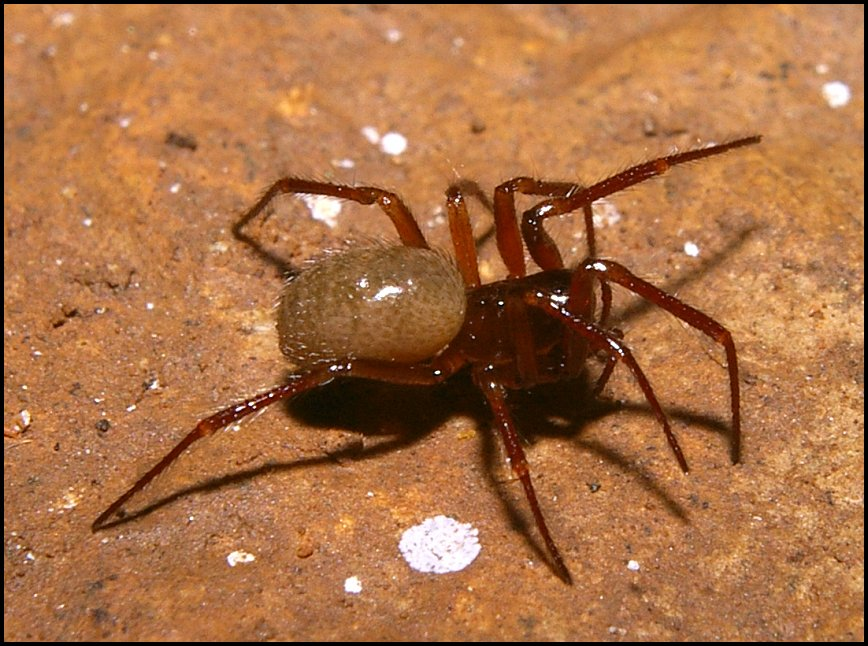
- In Hérault, France

Scientific classification
- Kingdom: Animalia
- Phylum: Arthropoda
- Subphylum: Chelicerata
- Class: Arachnida
- Order: Araneae
- Infraorder: Araneomorphae
- Family: Theridiidae
- Genus: Robertus
- Species: R. mazaurici

Binomial name
- Robertus mazaurici (Simon, 1901)

= Robertus mazaurici =

Species of spider

Robertus mazaurici is a species of araneomorph spider in the family Theridiidae first described by Eugène Simon in 1901.

== Etymology ==
This species was named in honor of the French speleologist and archeologist Félix Mazauric, a conservator at the Archeological Museum of Nîmes (1909–1919), who captured the first specimen in 1901.

== Distribution ==
R. mazaurici is endemic to France, and has been reported from Gard, Ariège, Pyrénées-Orientales, and Haute-Loire.
