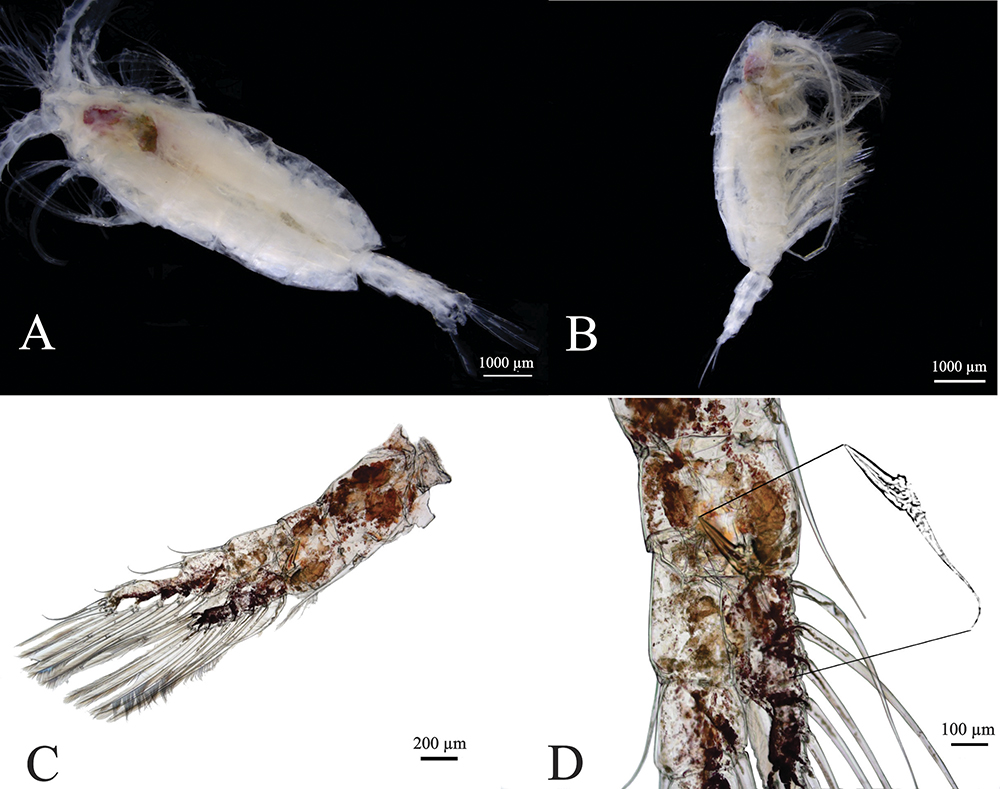
- Megacalanus princeps

Scientific classification
- Domain: Eukaryota
- Kingdom: Animalia
- Phylum: Arthropoda
- Class: Copepoda
- Order: Calanoida
- Family: Megacalanidae

= Megacalanidae =

Family of crustaceans

Megacalanidae is a family of copepods belonging to the order Calanoida.

Genera:

- Bathycalanus Sars, 1905
- Bradycalanus Scott, 1909
- Elenacalanus Bradford-Grieve, Blanco-Bercial & Boxshall, 2017
- Megacalanus Wolfenden, 1904
