= Robertus eremophilus =

Scientific classification
- Kingdom: Animalia
- Phylum: Arthropoda
- Subphylum: Chelicerata
- Class: Arachnida
- Order: Araneae
- Infraorder: Araneomorphae
- Family: Theridiidae
- Genus: Robertus
- Species: R. eremophilus

Binomial name
- Robertus eremophilus Chamberlin, 1928

Species of spider

Robertus eremophilus is a species of cobweb spider in the family Theridiidae. It is found in the United States.
