= Epacteriscidae =

Scientific classification
- Kingdom: Animalia
- Phylum: Arthropoda
- Class: Copepoda
- Order: Calanoida
- Family: Epacteriscidae

Epacteriscidae is a family of copepods belonging to the order Calanoida. Unlike most members of the order which are planktonic, epacteriscids are typically found in anchialine and marine caves.

== Description ==
Epacteriscids are characterized by several primitive features but are highly specialized for life in subterranean environments. They are notable within the order Calanoida for having mouthparts, specifically the maxilliped and maxilla, that are modified for a predatory or scavenging lifestyle rather than filter feeding.

== Distribution ==
The family has a wide but fragmented distribution, with species recorded from caves in the Caribbean, Bermuda, and the Indo-Pacific region. This distribution is of significant interest in biogeography, as it may reflect the historical movement of crustacean populations through ancient seaways.

== Genera ==
Genera:

- Azygonectes Fosshagen & Iliffe, 2004
- Balinella Fosshagen, Boxshall & Iliffe, 2001
- Bofuriella Fosshagen, Boxshall & Iliffe, 2001
- Edaxiella Fosshagen, Boxshall & Iliffe, 2001
- Enantiosis Barr, 1984
- Enantronia Fosshagen, Boxshall & Iliffe, 2001
- Enantronoides Fosshagen, Boxshall & Iliffe, 2001
- Epacturiscus Fosshagen, 1973
- Erebonectes Fosshagen, 1985
- Erebonectoides Fosshagen, Boxshall & Iliffe, 2001
- Gloinella Fosshagen, Boxshall & Iliffe, 2001
- Oinella Fosshagen, Boxshall & Iliffe, 2001
