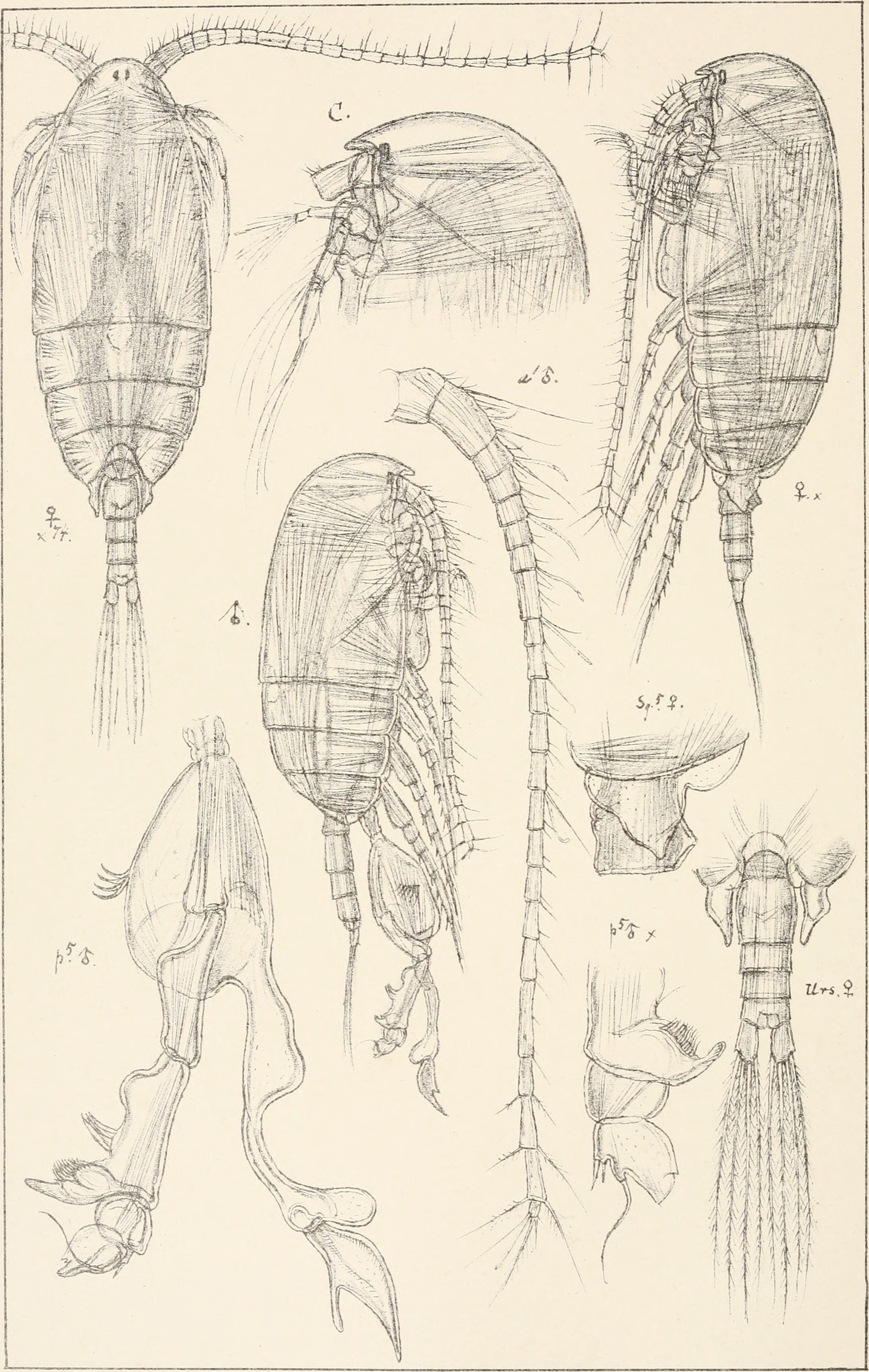

Scientific classification
- Domain: Eukaryota
- Kingdom: Animalia
- Phylum: Arthropoda
- Class: Copepoda
- Order: Calanoida
- Family: Diaixidae; Sars, 1902

= Diaixidae =

Family of crustaceans

Diaixidae is a family of copepods belonging to the order Calanoida.

Genera:

- Anawekia Othman & Greenwood, 1994
- Diaixis Sars, 1902
- Pogonura Komeda & Ohtsuka, 2020
- Procenognatha Markhaseva & Schulz, 2010
- Ranthaxus Markhaseva & Schulz, 2010
- Sensiava Markhaseva & Schulz, 2006
- Thoxancalanus Markhaseva, Laakmann & Renz, 2014
- Vensiasa Markhaseva, 2015
- Xancithrix Markhaseva, 2012
