= Acartia ensifera =

Scientific classification
- Domain: Eukaryota
- Kingdom: Animalia
- Phylum: Arthropoda
- Class: Copepoda
- Order: Calanoida
- Family: Acartiidae
- Genus: Acartia
- Species: A. ensifera

Binomial name
- Acartia ensifera Brady, 1899

Species of crustacean

Acartia ensifera is a species of marine copepod in the family Acartiidae. It is a slender species, measuring approximately 0.8–0.9 mm (0.031–0.035 in) in length, with distinctively long caudal rami. It is found in coastal waters around New Zealand.
