= Giesbrecht =

Surname list

Giesbrecht is the surname of the following people

- Gordon Giesbrecht, Canadian physiologist
- Helmut Giesbrecht (1943-2020), Canadian politician in British Columbia
- Mark Giesbrecht, Canadian computer scientist
- Wilhelm Giesbrecht (1854-1913), Prussian zoologist
