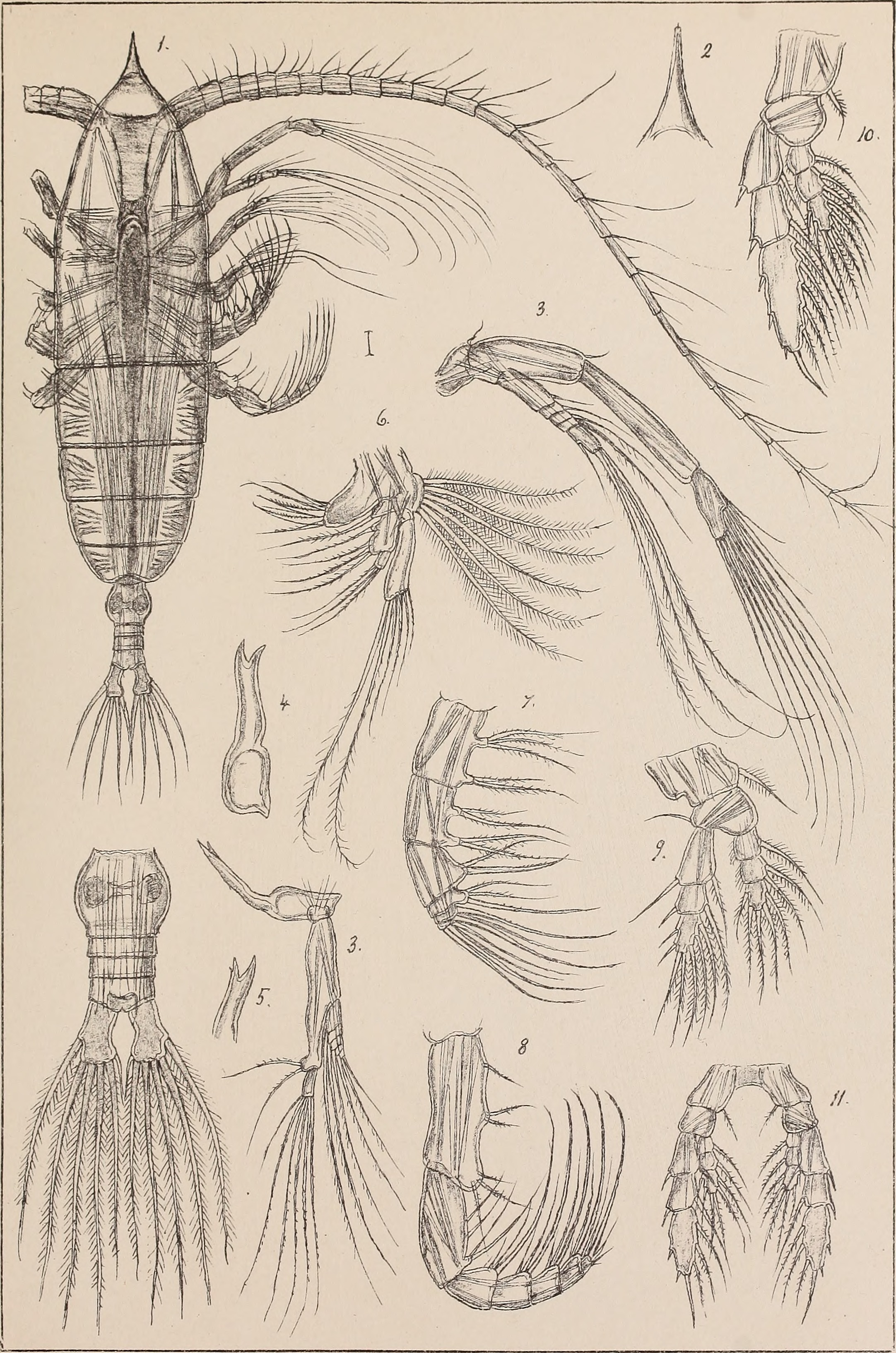

Scientific classification
- Kingdom: Animalia
- Phylum: Arthropoda
- Clade: Pancrustacea
- Class: Copepoda
- Order: Calanoida
- Family: Augaptilidae; G. O. Sars, 1905

= Augaptilidae =

Family of crustaceans

Augaptilidae is a family of copepods.

== Genera ==
The family contains the following genera:

- Alrhabdus Grice, 1973
- Augaptilina G. O. Sars, 1920
- Augaptilus Giesbrecht, 1889
- Centraugaptilus G. O. Sars, 1920
- Euaugaptilus G. O. Sars, 1920
- Frankferrarius Markhaseva, 2013
- Haloptilus Giesbrecht in Giesbrecht & Schmeil, 1898
- Heteroptilus G. O. Sars, 1920
- Pachyptilus G. O. Sars, 1920
- Pontoptilus G. O. Sars, 1905
- Pseudaugaptilus G. O. Sars, 1907
- Pseudhaloptilus Wolfenden, 1911
