= Tharybidae =

Scientific classification
- Kingdom: Animalia
- Phylum: Arthropoda
- Class: Copepoda
- Order: Calanoida
- Family: Tharybidae

Family of crustaceans

Tharybidae is a family of copepods belonging to the order Calanoida.

Genera:

- Neoscolecithrix Canu, 1896
- Parundinella Fleminger, 1957
- Rythabis Schulz & Beckmann, 1995
- Tharybis Sars, 1902
- Undinella Sars, 1900
