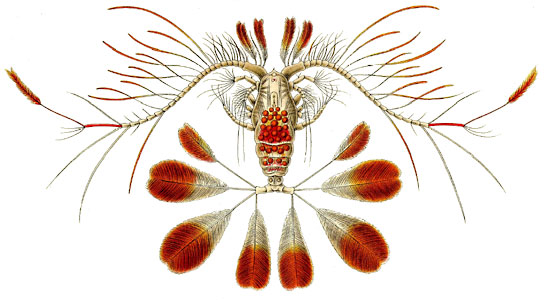
- Calocalanus pavo

Scientific classification
- Kingdom: Animalia
- Phylum: Arthropoda
- Clade: Pancrustacea
- Class: Copepoda
- Order: Calanoida
- Family: Paracalanidae; Giesbrecht, 1893

Genera
- See text

Synonyms
- Calocalanidae; Mecynoceridae

= Paracalanidae =

Family of crustaceans

Paracalanidae is a family of calanoid copepods, consisting of the following genera:

- Acrocalanus Giesbrecht, 1888
- Calocalanus Giesbrecht, 1888
- Bestiolina Andronov, 1991
- Delibus Vives & Shmelava, 2007
- Paracalanus Boeck, 1865
- Parvocalanus Andronov, 1970
- Pseudoparacalanus Robinson, 1948

Parvocalanus is one of the smallest of the calanoid genera, and P. crassirostris is thought to be the smallest described calanoid (male prosome = 0.7 mm). Two species, P. crassirostris and P. brevispinis, are common. The former is a widely distributed subtropical species that feeds largely on small flagellate phytoplankton. Although a subtropical species might be expected to flourish in summer, external factors such as predation can produce anomalous patterns of abundance. For example, in Long Island Sound the species does not reach its peak of abundance until October, when the disappearance of ctenophores relieves predation pressure P. crassirostris is widely used as fish food in the aquaculture and aquarium industries, being relatively easy to maintain in culture.
