= Eucalanidae =

Scientific classification
- Domain: Eukaryota
- Kingdom: Animalia
- Phylum: Arthropoda
- Class: Copepoda
- Order: Calanoida
- Family: Eucalanidae; Giesbrecht, 1893

Synonyms
- Subeucalanidae Geletin, 1976; Subeucalaninae Geletin, 1976

Family of crustaceans

Eucalanidae is a family of copepods belonging to the order Calanoida.

Genera:

- Eucalanus Dana, 1852
- Pareucalanus Geletin, 1976
- Subeucalanus Geletin, 1976
