= Clausocalanidae =

Scientific classification
- Kingdom: Animalia
- Phylum: Arthropoda
- Clade: Pancrustacea
- Class: Copepoda
- Order: Calanoida
- Family: Clausocalanidae; Giesbrecht, 1893

Synonyms
- Pseudocalanidae

Family of crustaceans

Clausocalanidae is a family of copepods belonging to the order Calanoida.

Genera:

- Clausocalanus Giesbrecht, 1888
- Ctenocalanus Giesbrecht, 1888
- Drepanopus Brady, 1883
- Microcalanus Sars, 1903
- Peniculoides Markhaseva & Renz, 2015
- Pseudocalanus Boeck, 1872
- Spicipes Grice & Hulsemann, 1965
