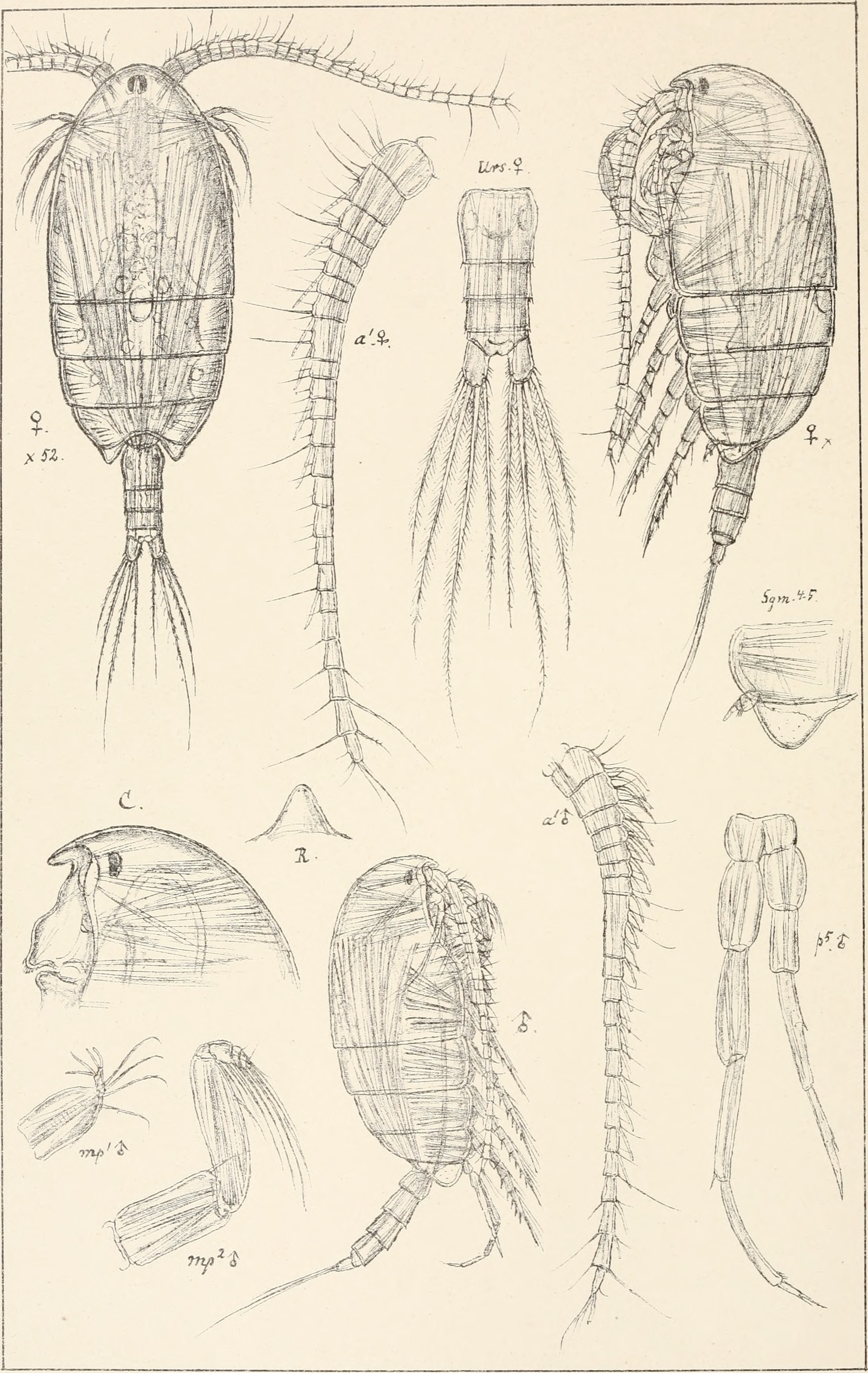

Scientific classification
- Kingdom: Animalia
- Phylum: Arthropoda
- Clade: Pancrustacea
- Class: Copepoda
- Order: Calanoida
- Family: Phaennidae; G. O. Sars, 1902

Genera
- See text

= Phaennidae =

Family of crustaceans

Phaennidae is a family of planktonic copepods, found in pelagic or benthopelagic waters. In 2010, Bradford-Grieve and others gave a cladistic analysis placing it as a sister clade to the family Tharybidae.

It contains the following genera:

- Brachycalanus Farran, 1905
- Cephalophanes Sars, 1907
- Cornucalanus Wolfenden, 1905
- Kirnesius Markhaseva & Semenova, 2005
- Onchocalanus Sars, 1905
- Phaenna Claus, 1863
- Phaennocalanus Markhaseva, 2002
- Talacalanus Wolfenden, 1911
- Xanthocalanus Giesbrecht, 1892
