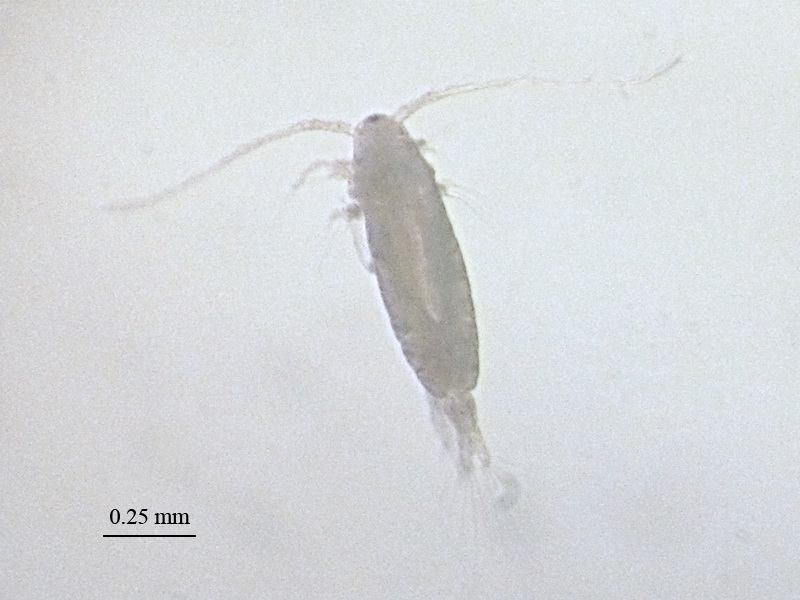

Scientific classification
- Domain: Eukaryota
- Kingdom: Animalia
- Phylum: Arthropoda
- Class: Copepoda
- Order: Calanoida
- Family: Acartiidae
- Genus: Acartia
- Species: A. clausi

Binomial name
- Acartia clausi Giesbrecht, 1889

Synonyms
- Acartia clausii Giesbrecht, 1889

= Acartia clausi =

Species of crustacean

Acartia clausi is a species of marine copepod belonging to the family Acartiidae. This species was previously thought to have a worldwide distribution but recent research has restricted its range to coastal regions of the north-eastern Atlantic Ocean as far north as Iceland, the Mediterranean Sea and the Black Sea, with specimens from other regions assigned to different species.

At just over 1 mm in length, this is a generally larger animal than its closest congeners. It can also be distinguished by the row of large spines at the rear margin of the body segment known as the metasome.
