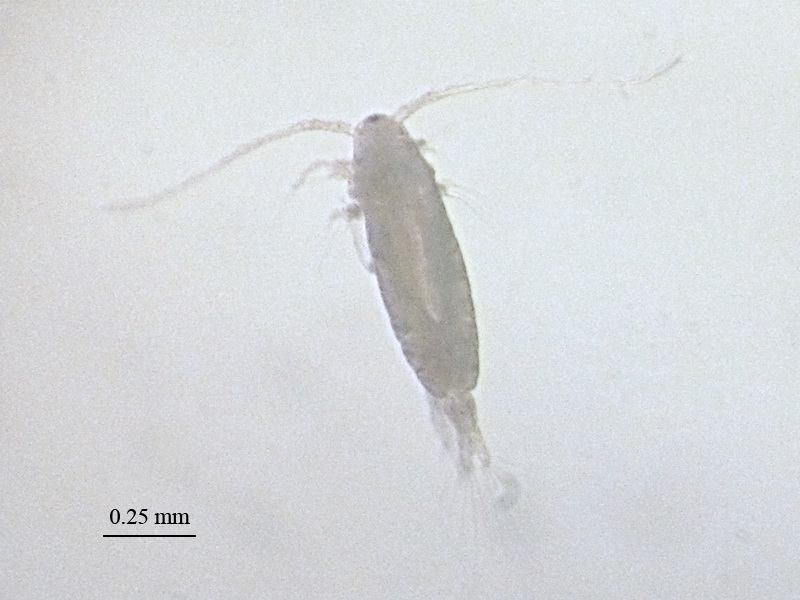
- Acartia clausi

Scientific classification
- Domain: Eukaryota
- Kingdom: Animalia
- Phylum: Arthropoda
- Class: Copepoda
- Order: Calanoida
- Family: Acartiidae; Sars, 1903

Genera
- Acartia Dana, 1846; Acartiella Sewell, 1914; Paracartia T. Scott, 1894; Paralabidocera Wolfenden, 1908; Pteriacartia Belmonte, 1998

= Acartiidae =

Family of crustaceans

Acartiidae is a family of calanoid copepods distinguishable by the rostral margin not being extended. They are epipelagic, planktonic animals, not being found below a depth of 500 metres (1,600 ft). There are over 100 described species distributed throughout the world's oceans, mainly in temperate areas.
