= Afrolaophonte koreana =

Scientific classification
- Kingdom: Animalia
- Phylum: Arthropoda
- Class: Copepoda
- Order: Harpacticoida
- Family: Laophontidae
- Genus: Afrolaophonte
- Species: A. koreana

Binomial name
- Afrolaophonte koreana Karanovic, 2022
- Type site: South Korea, South Sea, Dangdong'"`UNIQ--ref-00000002-QINU`"'

Species of crustacean

Afrolaophonte koreana is a species of marine copepod belonging to the family Laophontidae. The species was first described in 2022 by Tomislav Karanovic, from specimens found in the interstices of sand on Dangdong Beach in South Korea.
