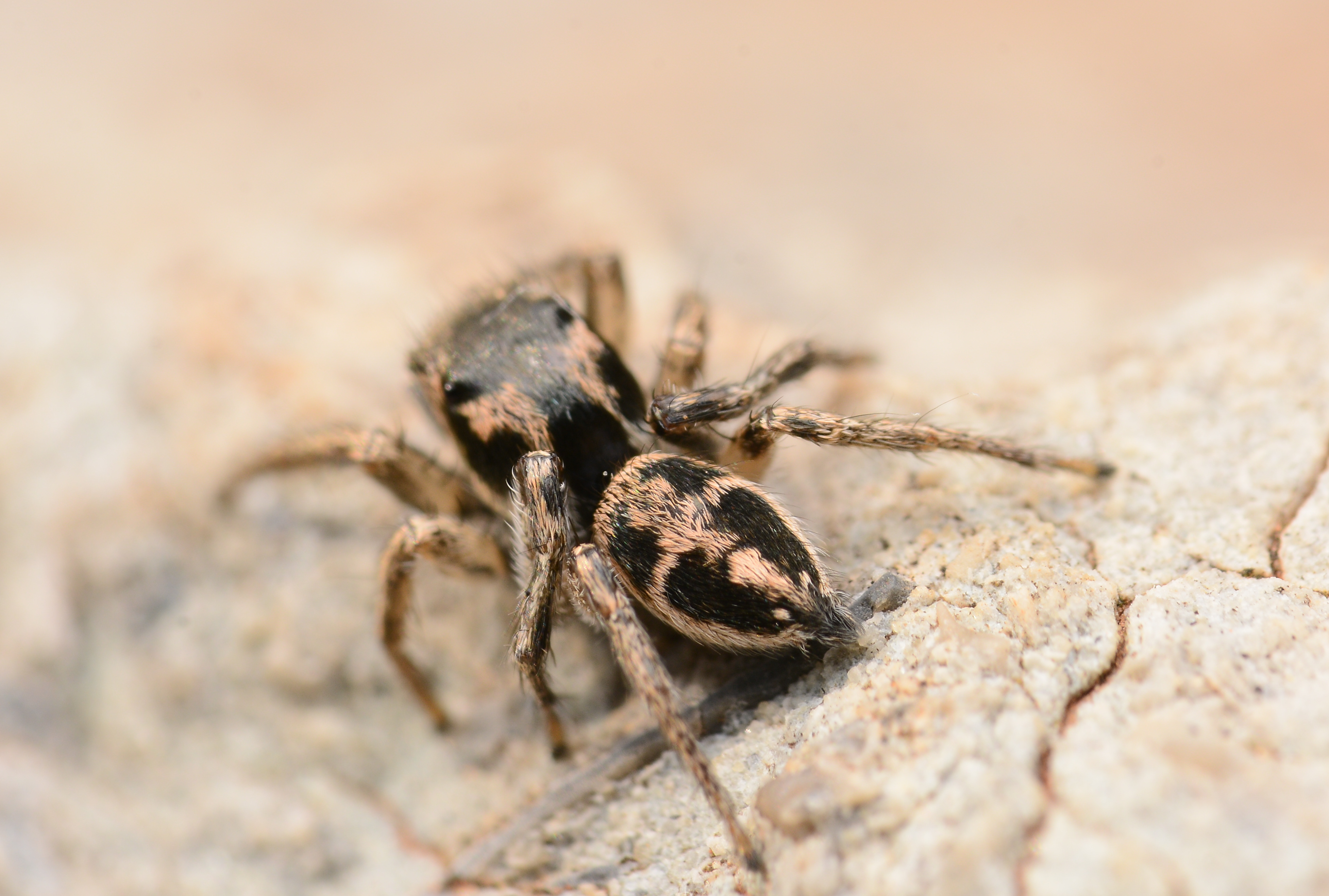
- Male

Scientific classification
- Kingdom: Animalia
- Phylum: Arthropoda
- Subphylum: Chelicerata
- Class: Arachnida
- Order: Araneae
- Infraorder: Araneomorphae
- Family: Salticidae
- Genus: Habronattus
- Species: H. borealis

Binomial name
- Habronattus borealis (Banks, 1895)

= Habronattus borealis =

Species of spider

Habronattus borealis is a species of jumping spiders from the family Salticidae, found in Canada and the United States.

== Discovery ==
The species was discovered by an American arachnologist named J. H. Emerton, in June 1901. During that summer month, he and another arachnologist, George Peckham, stumbled on the species while going through salt marshes. At first, they thought it was a spiderling of Habronattus coecatus. But it turned out to be a different species. Even today, people can still find the creatures in the same place as they were found in.

== Description ==
The males are brown and black while the females are brown. Subadult males have a red clypeus.

== Gallery ==
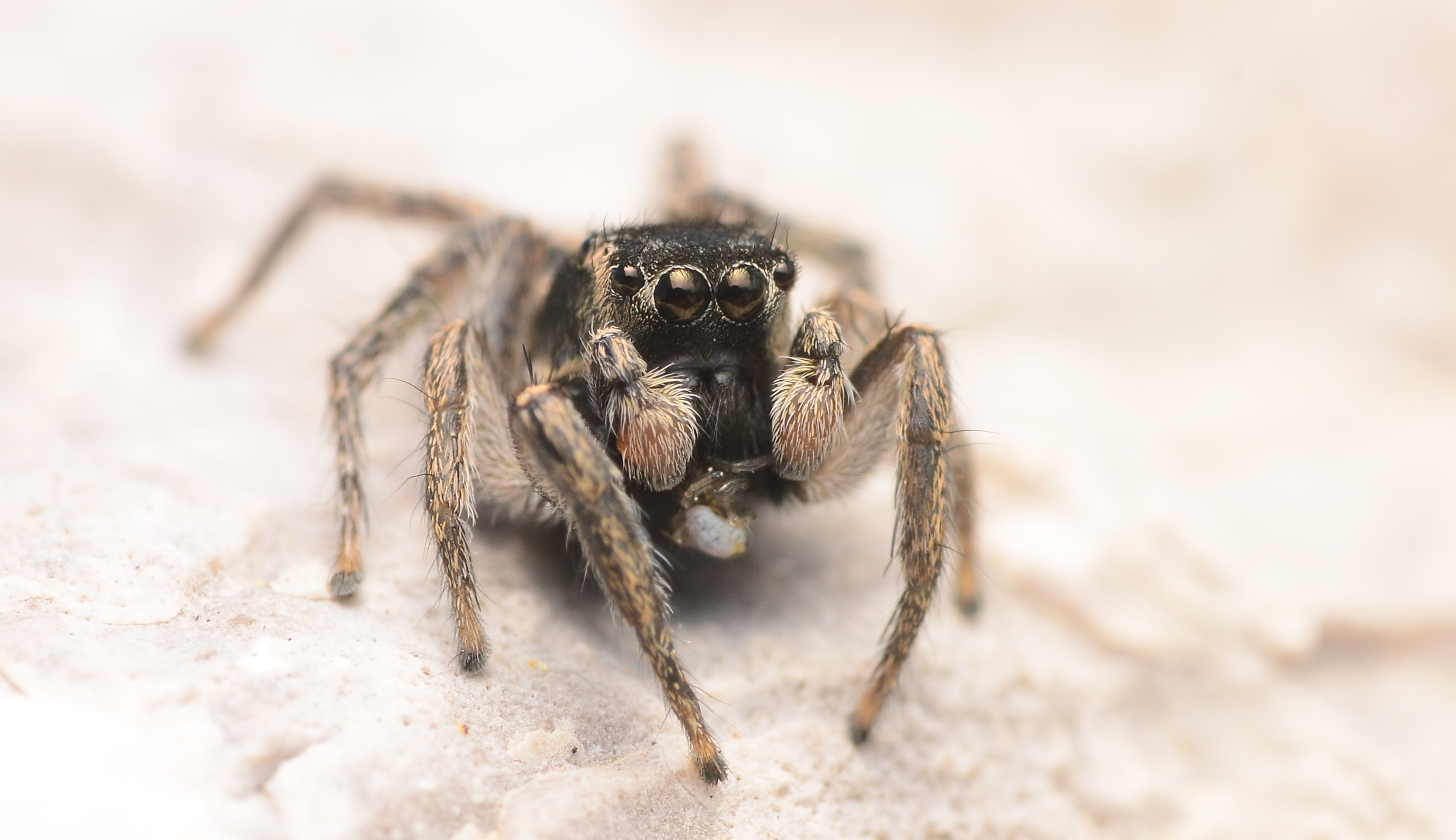
Male face

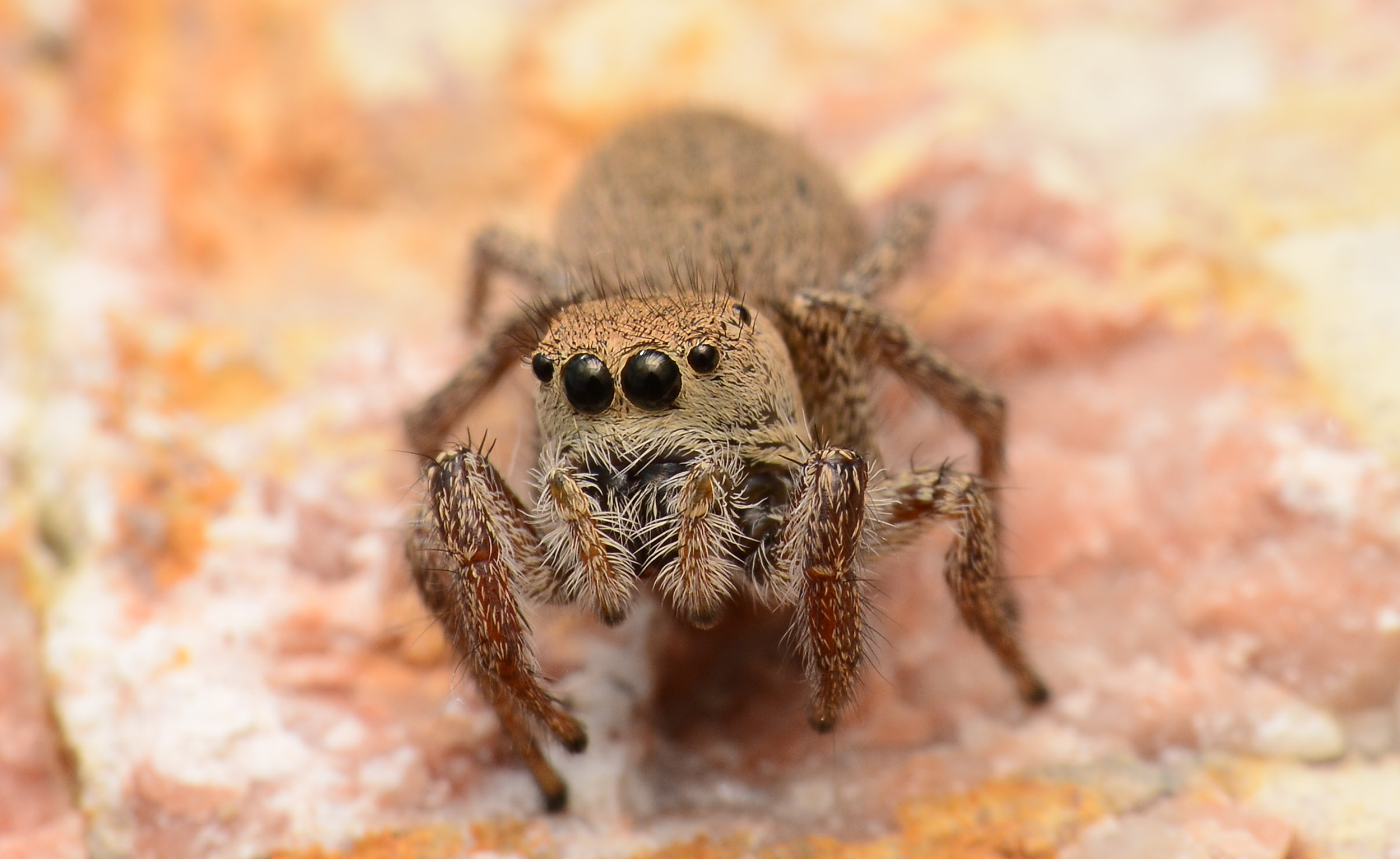
Female face

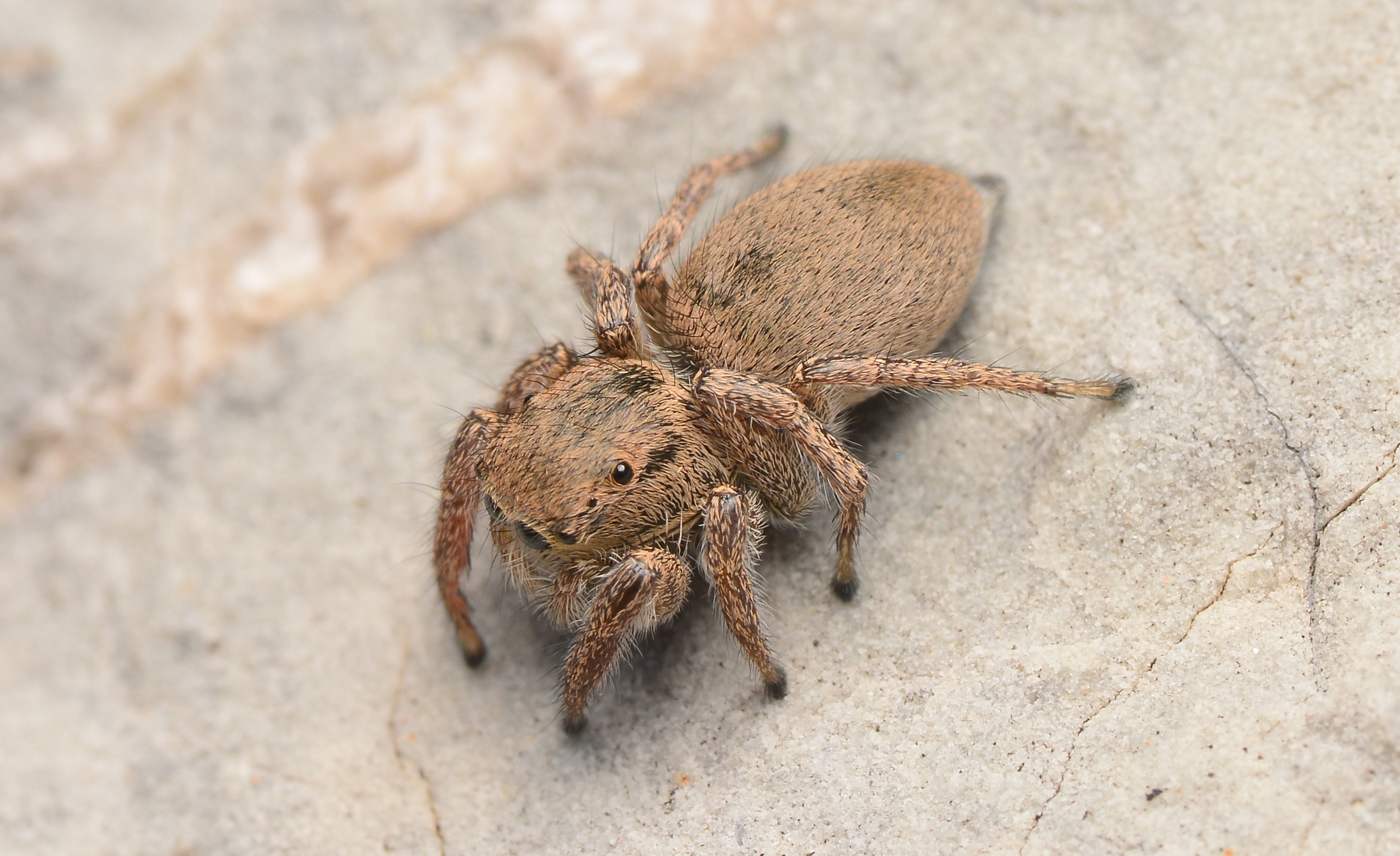
Female dorsal
