= Murunducaris juneae =

Conservation status
- Conservation Dependent (IUCN 2.3)

Scientific classification
- Kingdom: Animalia
- Phylum: Arthropoda
- Class: Copepoda
- Order: Harpacticoida
- Family: Parastenocarididae
- Genus: Murunducaris
- Species: M. juneae

Binomial name
- Murunducaris juneae Reid, 1994

Species of crustacean

Murunducaris juneae is a species of crustacean in the family Parastenocarididae. It is endemic to Brazil.
