= Emertonia constricta =

Scientific classification
- Kingdom: Animalia
- Phylum: Arthropoda
- Clade: Pancrustacea
- Class: Copepoda
- Order: Harpacticoida
- Family: Paramesochridae
- Genus: Emertonia
- Species: E. constricta

Binomial name
- Emertonia constricta (Nichols, 1935)

Subspecies
- Emertonia constricta constricta (Nicholls, 1935); Emertonia constricta orotavae (Noodt, 1958)

Synonyms
- Leptopsyllus constrictus Nicholls, 1935; Paramesochra constricta (Nicholls, 1935)

Species of arthropod

Emertonia constricta is a species of copepod. It belongs to the family Paramesochridae. It lives in the North Sea.
