= Clytemnestrinae =

Scientific classification
- Domain: Eukaryota
- Kingdom: Animalia
- Phylum: Arthropoda
- Class: Copepoda
- Order: Harpacticoida
- Family: Peltidiidae
- Subfamily: Clytemnestrinae; Scott A., 1909

Synonyms
- Pseudopeltidiidae Clytemnestridae

Family of crustaceans

Clytemnestrinae is a subfamily of copepods belonging to family Peltidiidae in the order Harpacticoida.

Genera:

- Clytemnestra Dana, 1847
- Goniopsyllus Brady, 1883
