= Leptocaris stromatolicolus =

Conservation status
- Vulnerable (IUCN 2.3)

Scientific classification
- Kingdom: Animalia
- Phylum: Arthropoda
- Class: Copepoda
- Order: Harpacticoida
- Family: Darcythompsoniidae
- Genus: Leptocaris
- Species: L. stromatolicolus

Binomial name
- Leptocaris stromatolicolus Zamudio-Valdés & Reid, 1990

Species of crustacean

Leptocaris stromatolicolus is a species of harpacticoid copepod in the family Darcythompsoniidae. It is found in Central America.

The IUCN conservation status of Leptocaris stromatolicolus is "VU", vulnerable. The species faces a high risk of endangerment in the medium term. The IUCN status was reviewed in 1996.
