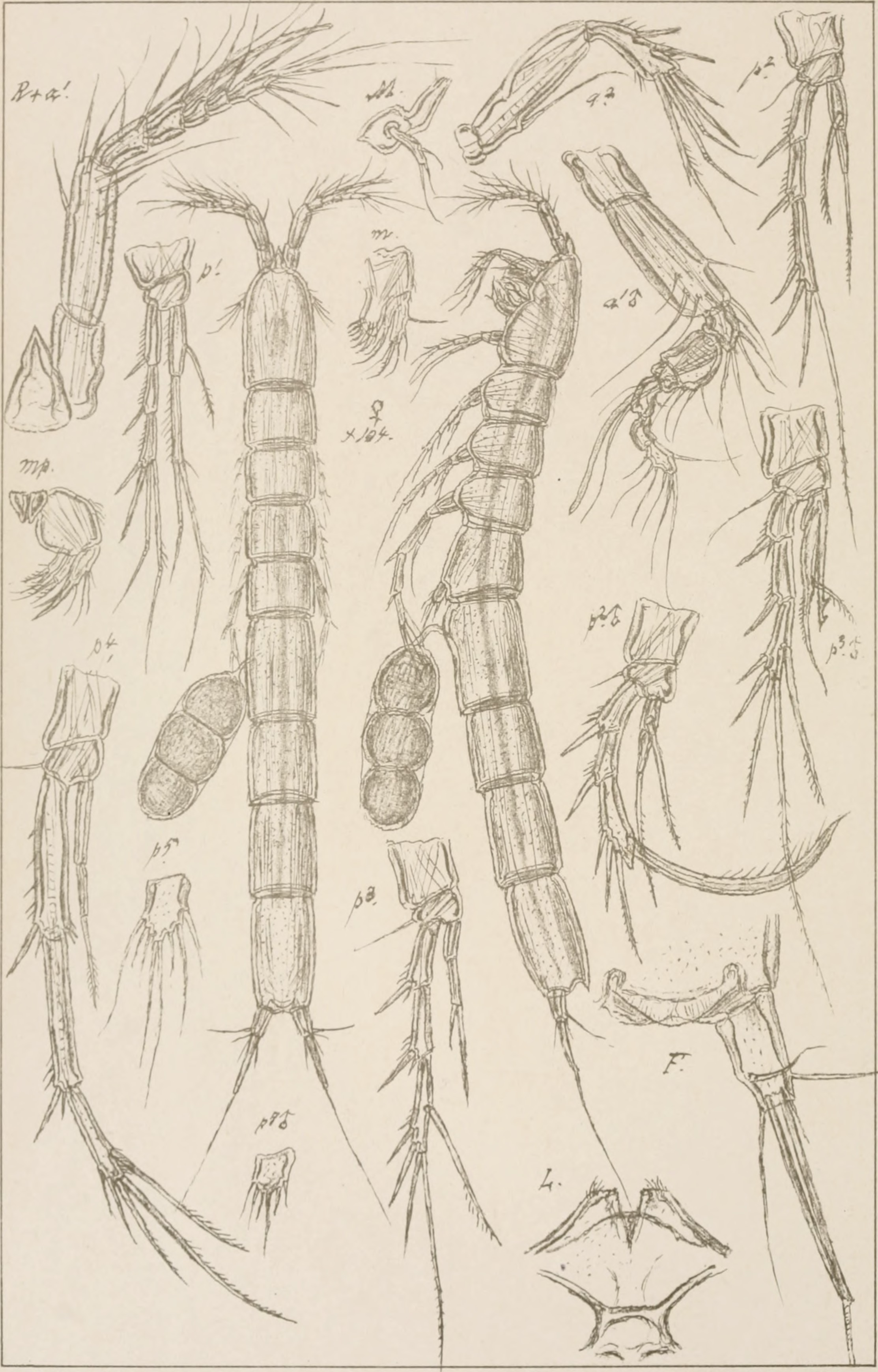
- An illustration of members of Cyclindropsyllidae

Scientific classification
- Kingdom: Animalia
- Phylum: Arthropoda
- Clade: Pancrustacea
- Class: Copepoda
- Order: Harpacticoida
- Family: Cylindropsyllidae; Sars (1909)

Subfamilies
- Cylindropsyllinae, Leptastacinae, Leptopontiinae

= Cylindropsyllidae =

Family of crustaceans

Cylindropsyllidae is a family of copepods belonging to the order Harpacticoida. It was first described by Sars in 1909, and was revised by Lang in 1936.

The species is mainly found in sand and mud on the ocean floor. Most Cylindropsyllidae are less than a millimeter long and feed on algae, bacteria, and other decaying organic matter. They play an important role in recycling nutrients and supporting marine food webs, making them valuable indicators of healthy coastal ecosystems.

== Genera ==
As of 1987, Cylindropsyllidae consists of 17 genera:

- Arenocaris Nicholls, 1935
- Bolbotelos Huys & Conroy-Dalton, 2006
- Boreopontia Willems, 1981
- Boreovermis Huys & Conroy-Dalton, 2006
- Cylindropsyllus Brady, 1880
- Cylinnula Coull, 1971
- Evansula T. Scott 1906
- Leptastacus T. Scott, 1906
- Monsmeteoris Richter, 2019
- Navalonia Huys & Conroy-Dalton, 1993
- Selenopsyllus Moura & Pottek, 1998
- Stenocaris Sars G.O., 1909
- Stenocaropsis Apostolov, 1982
- Paraleptastacus Wilson, 1932
- Psammastacus Nicholls, 1935
- Vermicaris Kornev & Cheroprud, 2008
- Willemsia Huys & Conroy-Dalton, 1993

Cylindropsyllidae originally contained the genera Cylindropsyllus, Stenocaris, Darcythompsonia, and Leptocaris. The latter two were later moved to the family Darcythompsoniidae. This revision also introduced seven additional genera, divided into 3 subfamilies.
