= Satilatlas =

Scientific classification
- Kingdom: Animalia
- Phylum: Arthropoda
- Subphylum: Chelicerata
- Class: Arachnida
- Order: Araneae
- Infraorder: Araneomorphae
- Family: Linyphiidae
- Genus: Satilatlas; Keyserling, 1886

Type species
- S. marxi Keyserling, 1886

Species
- 8, see text

Synonyms
- Perimones Jackson, 1932

Genus of spiders

Satilatlas is a genus of sheet weavers that was first described by Eugen von Keyserling in 1886.

== Species ==
As of May 2019 it contains eight species and one subspecies, found in Europe, Russia, the United States, Canada, and Alaska:

- Satilatlas arenarius (Emerton, 1911) – USA, Canada
- Satilatlas britteni (Jackson, 1913) – Europe
- Satilatlas carens Millidge, 1981 – Canada
- Satilatlas gentilis Millidge, 1981 – USA
- Satilatlas gertschi Millidge, 1981 – Canada
- Satilatlas insolens Millidge, 1981 – USA
- Satilatlas marxi Keyserling, 1886 (type) – Russia, USA (Alaska), Canada
  - Satilatlas m. matanuskae (Chamberlin, 1949) – USA (Alaska)
- Satilatlas monticola Millidge, 1981 – USA, Canada
