= Nannopus =

Scientific classification
- Domain: Eukaryota
- Kingdom: Animalia
- Phylum: Arthropoda
- Class: Copepoda
- Order: Harpacticoida
- Family: Nannopodidae
- Genus: Nannopus; Brady, 1880

Type species
- Nannopus palustris Brady, 1880

Genus of crustaceans

Nannopus is a genus of copepods belonging to the family Nannopodidae.

The species of this genus are found in Europe, Japan and Northern America.

Species:

- Nannopus brasiliensis Jakobi, 1956
- Nannopus bulbiseta Vakati & W.Lee, 2017
- Nannopus didelphis Fiers & Kotwicki, 2013
- Nannopus dimorphicus Vakati & W.Lee, 2017
- Nannopus ganghwaensis Vakati, Kihara & W.Lee, 2017
- Nannopus hirsutus Fiers & Kotwicki, 2013
- Nannopus minutus Vakati & W.Lee, 2017
- Nannopus palustris Brady, 1880
- Nannopus parvipilis Kim, J.G., Choi & Yoon, 2017
- Nannopus parvus Vakati & W.Lee, 2017
- Nannopus perplexus (Sars G.O., 1909)
- Nannopus procerus Fiers & Kotwicki, 2013
- Nannopus scaldicola Fiers & Kotwicki, 2013
- Nannopus serratus Vakati & W.Lee, 2017
- Nannopus unisegmentatus Shen & Tai, 1964
