= Parastenocaris =

Scientific classification
- Domain: Eukaryota
- Kingdom: Animalia
- Phylum: Arthropoda
- Class: Copepoda
- Order: Harpacticoida
- Family: Parastenocarididae
- Genus: Parastenocaris; Kessler, 1913

Genus of crustaceans

Parastenocaris is a genus of copepods belonging to the family Parastenocarididae.

The species of this genus are found in Europe, Africa and Northern America.

Species:

- Parastenocaris aberrans Apostolov, 2004
- Parastenocaris aedes Hertzog, 1938
