= Afrolaophonte =

Scientific classification
- Kingdom: Animalia
- Phylum: Arthropoda
- Class: Copepoda
- Order: Harpacticoida
- Family: Laophontidae
- Subfamily: Laophontinae
- Genus: Afrolaophonte; Chappuis, 1960

Type species
- Afrolaophonte monodi Chappuis, 1960

Genus of crustaceans

Afrolaophonte is a genus of marine copepods belonging to the family Laophontidae. The genus was first described in 1960 by Chappuis. The type species is Afrolaophonte monodi Chappuis, 1960.

Species of this genus are small wormlike animals that live in the interstices of the sand in the intertidal zone of sandy beaches.

Species:

- Afrolaophonte aequatorialis Cottarelli & Mura, 1982
- Afrolaophonte brevipes (Chappuis, 1954)
- Afrolaophonte brignolii Cottarelli, 1986
- Afrolaophonte chilensis Mielke, 1985
- Afrolaophonte ensiger Wells & Rao, 1987
- Afrolaophonte koreana Karanovic, 2022
- Afrolaophonte leonis Cottarelli & Mura, 1982
- Afrolaophonte michae Cottarelli, 1986
- Afrolaophonte michaelae Cottarelli & Mura, 1982
- Afrolaophonte monodi Chappuis, 1960
- Afrolaophonte pori Masry, 1970
- Afrolaophonte renaudi (Chappuis & Delamare Deboutteville, 1956)
- Afrolaophonte schmidti Mielke, 1981
- Afrolaophonte stocki Fiers, 1990
