= Anthrobia =

Scientific classification
- Kingdom: Animalia
- Phylum: Arthropoda
- Subphylum: Chelicerata
- Class: Arachnida
- Order: Araneae
- Infraorder: Araneomorphae
- Family: Linyphiidae
- Genus: Anthrobia; Tellkampf, 1844

Type species
- A. monmouthia Tellkampf, 1844

Species
- 4, see text

Genus of spiders

Anthrobia is a genus of North American dwarf spiders that was first described by T. Tellkampf in 1844.

== Species ==
As of May 2019 it contains four species, all found in the United States:

- Anthrobia acuminata (Emerton, 1913) – USA
- Anthrobia coylei Miller, 2005 – USA
- Anthrobia monmouthia Tellkampf, 1844 (type) – USA
- Anthrobia whiteleyae Miller, 2005 – USA
