= Porcellidium =

Scientific classification
- Domain: Eukaryota
- Kingdom: Animalia
- Phylum: Arthropoda
- Class: Copepoda
- Order: Harpacticoida
- Family: Porcellidiidae
- Genus: Porcellidium; Claus, 1860

Genus of copepod crustaceans

Porcellidium is a genus of harpacticoid copepods in the family Porcellidiidae, first described by Carl Friedrich Wilhelm Claus in 1860 in: Claus, C. 1860. Beitraege zur Kenntniss der Entomostraken. Erstes Heft. N.G. Elwert’sche Universitaets-Buchhandlung, Marburg.: 1–28; Pls. 1–4.

The type species is Porcellidium viridis (Philippi, 1840) accepted as Porcellidium viride (Philippi, 1840).

== Species ==
As of October 2023, the following species are accepted in the genus Porcellidium:

- Porcellidium akashimum Harris V.A. & Iwasaki, 1996
- Porcellidium algoense Hicks, 1982
- Porcellidium brevicavum Kim I.H. & H.S. Kim, 1997
- Porcellidium erythrogastrum Harris V.A. & H.M. Robertson, 1994
- Porcellidium erythrum Hicks, 1971
- Porcellidium fasciatum Boeck, 1865
- Porcellidium hartmannorum Tiemann, 1978
- Porcellidium hormosirii Harris V.A. & H.M. Robertson, 1994
- Porcellidium kiiroum Harris V.A. & Iwasaki, 1996
- Porcellidium londonarum Harris V.A., 1994
- Porcellidium malleatum Vervoort, 1964
- Porcellidium naviculum Harris V.A. & H.M. Robertson, 1994
- Porcellidium ocellum Harris V.A. & Robertson H.M., 1994
- Porcellidium ofunatense Harris V.A. & Iwasaki, 1996
- Porcellidium phyllosporum Harris V.A. & H.M. Robertson, 1994
- Porcellidium pulchrum Harris V.A. & H.M. Robertson, 1994
- Porcellidium rastellum Harris V.A., 2014
- Porcellidium roscoffensis (Bocquet, 1948)
- Porcellidium rubrum Pallares, 1966
- Porcellidium viride (Philippi, 1840)
- Porcellidium wandoensis Kim I.H. & H.S. Kim, 1997
