= Murunducaris =

Scientific classification
- Domain: Eukaryota
- Kingdom: Animalia
- Phylum: Arthropoda
- Class: Copepoda
- Order: Harpacticoida
- Family: Parastenocarididae
- Subfamily: Fontinalicaridinae
- Genus: Murunducaris; Reid, 1994

Genus of crustaceans

Murunducaris is a genus of crustacean in family Parastenocarididae. It contains the following species:

- Murunducaris dactyloides (Kiefer, 1967)
- Murunducaris juneae Reid, 1994
- Murunducaris loyolai Corgosinho, Martínez Arbizu & Reid, 2008
- Murunducaris noodti Corgosinho, Martínez Arbizu & Reid, 2008
