= Sciastes =

Scientific classification
- Kingdom: Animalia
- Phylum: Arthropoda
- Subphylum: Chelicerata
- Class: Arachnida
- Order: Araneae
- Infraorder: Araneomorphae
- Family: Linyphiidae
- Genus: Sciastes; Bishop & Crosby, 1938

Type species
- S. truncatus (Emerton, 1882)

Species
- 7, see text

Genus of spiders

Sciastes is a genus of sheet weavers that was first described by S. C. Bishop & C. R. Crosby in 1938.

== Species ==
As of May 2019 it contains seven species, found in Europe and Russia:

- Sciastes carli (Lessert, 1907) – France, Italy, Switzerland, Austria
- Sciastes dubius (Hackman, 1954) – Russia, Canada, USA
- Sciastes extremus Holm, 1967 – Canada, Greenland
- Sciastes hastatus Millidge, 1984 – USA, Canada
- Sciastes mentasta (Chamberlin & Ivie, 1947) – Canada, USA (Alaska)
- Sciastes tenna Chamberlin, 1949 – USA
- Sciastes truncatus (Emerton, 1882) (type) – USA, Canada
