= Horcotes =

Scientific classification
- Kingdom: Animalia
- Phylum: Arthropoda
- Subphylum: Chelicerata
- Class: Arachnida
- Order: Araneae
- Infraorder: Araneomorphae
- Family: Linyphiidae
- Genus: Horcotes; Crosby & Bishop, 1933

Type species
- H. quadricristatus (Emerton, 1882)

Species
- H. quadricristatus (Emerton, 1882) – USA; H. strandi (Sytshevskaja, 1935) – Scandinavia, Russia (Europe to Far East), Canada; H. uncinatus Barrows, 1945 – USA

Genus of spiders

Horcotes is a genus of dwarf spiders that was first described by C. R. Crosby & S. C. Bishop in 1933. As of May 2019 it contains only three species, found in Canada, Russia, and the United States: H. quadricristatus, H. strandi, and H. uncinatus.
