= Origanates =

Scientific classification
- Kingdom: Animalia
- Phylum: Arthropoda
- Subphylum: Chelicerata
- Class: Arachnida
- Order: Araneae
- Infraorder: Araneomorphae
- Family: Linyphiidae
- Genus: Origanates; Crosby & Bishop, 1933
- Species: O. rostratus

Binomial name
- Origanates rostratus (Emerton, 1882)

Genus of spiders

Origanates is a monotypic genus of North American dwarf spiders containing the single species, Origanates rostratus. It was first described by C. R. Crosby & S. C. Bishop in 1933, and has only been found in the United States.
