= Phlattothrata =

Scientific classification
- Kingdom: Animalia
- Phylum: Arthropoda
- Subphylum: Chelicerata
- Class: Arachnida
- Order: Araneae
- Infraorder: Araneomorphae
- Family: Linyphiidae
- Genus: Phlattothrata; Crosby & Bishop, 1933

Type species
- P. flagellata (Emerton, 1911)

Species
- 2, see text

Genus of spiders

Phlattothrata is a genus of dwarf spiders that was first described by C. R. Crosby & S. C. Bishop in 1933.

== Species ==
As of May 2019 it contains two species:

- Phlattothrata flagellata (Emerton, 1911) (type) – USA
- Phlattothrata parva (Kulczyński, 1926) – Russia (Siberia to Far East), North America
