= Halectinosoma =

Scientific classification
- Domain: Eukaryota
- Kingdom: Animalia
- Phylum: Arthropoda
- Class: Copepoda
- Order: Harpacticoida
- Family: Ectinosomatidae
- Genus: Halectinosoma; Vervoort, 1962

Genus of crustaceans

Halectinosoma is a genus of copepods belonging to the family Ectinosomatidae with around 70 described species.

The genus has almost cosmopolitan distribution.

Species:

- Halectinosoma abrau (Krichagin, 1877)
- Halectinosoma abyssicola Bodin, 1968
- Halectinosoma angulifrons (Sars, 1919)
- Halectinosoma arangureni Suárez-Morales & Fuentes-Reines, 2015
- Halectinosoma arenicola (Rouch, 1962)
- Halectinosoma argyllensis Clément & Moore, 1995
- Halectinosoma barroisi (Richard, 1893)
- Halectinosoma bodotriaensis Clément & Moore, 1999
- Halectinosoma brevirostre (Sars G.O., 1904)
- Halectinosoma britannicum Clément & Moore, 2000
- Halectinosoma brunneum (Brady, 1905)
- Halectinosoma canaliculatum (Por, 1964)
- Halectinosoma candelabrum Soyer, 1970
- Halectinosoma chislenki Clément & Moore, 1995
- Halectinosoma chrystali (Scott T., 1894)
- Halectinosoma clavatum (Sars G.O., 1920)
- Halectinosoma concinnum (Akatova, 1935)
- Halectinosoma cooperatum Bodin, Bodiou & Soyer, 1971
- Halectinosoma crenulatum Clément & Moore, 1995
- Halectinosoma curticorne (Boeck, 1872)
- Halectinosoma denticulatum Clément & Moore, 1995
- Halectinosoma dimorphum Coull, 1970
- Halectinosoma diops (Por, 1964)
- Halectinosoma distinctum (Sars G.O., 1920)
- Halectinosoma elongatum (Sars G.O., 1904)
- Halectinosoma erythrops (Brady & Robertson, 1876)
- Halectinosoma foveolata Kim J.G., Jung & Yoon, 2017
- Halectinosoma langi Wells, 1967
- Halectinosoma munmui Bang, 2021
- Halectinosoma oblongum (Kunz, 1949)
- Halectinosoma perforatum Itô, 1981

...
