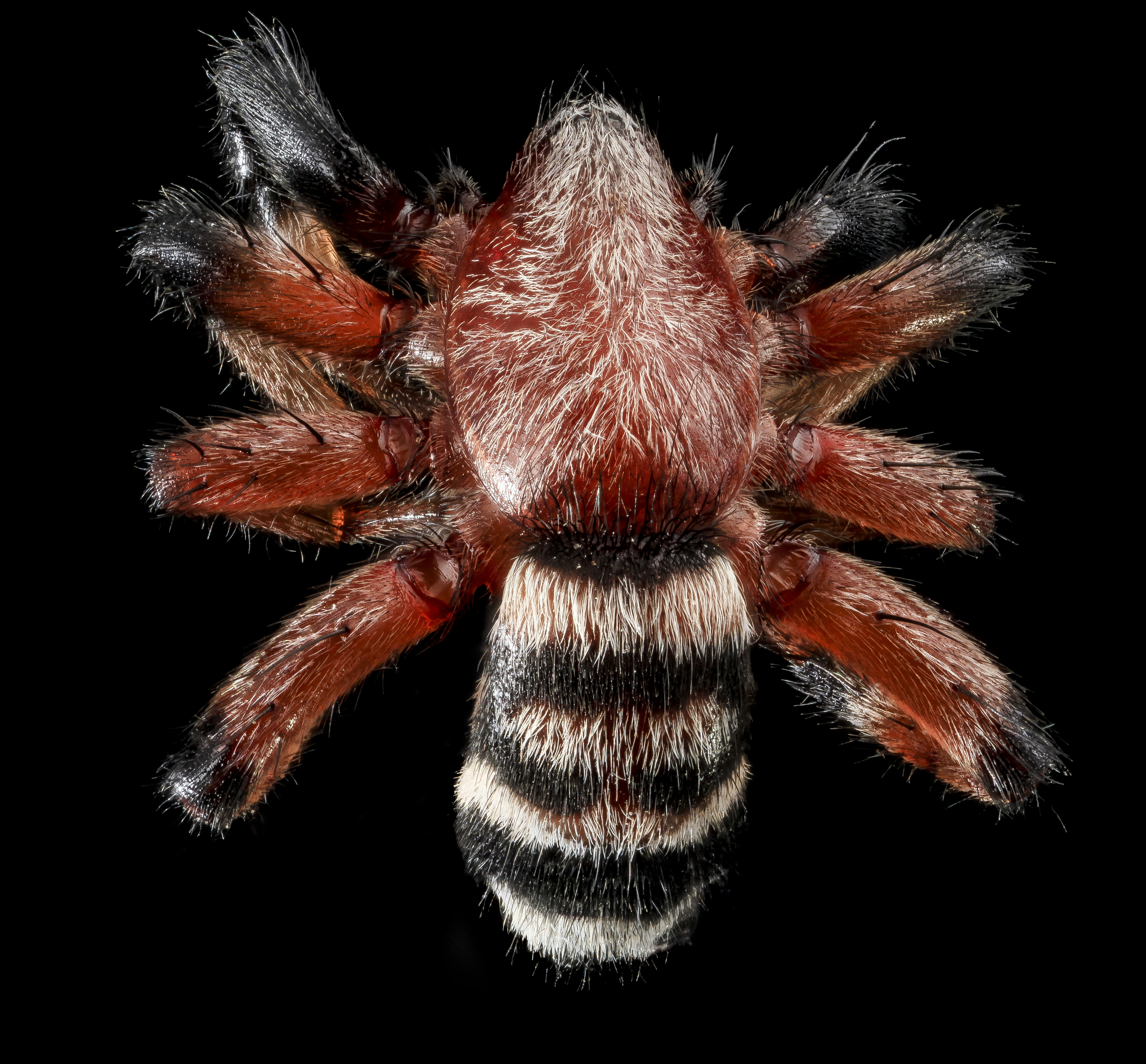
- S. capulatus

Scientific classification
- Domain: Eukaryota
- Kingdom: Animalia
- Phylum: Arthropoda
- Subphylum: Chelicerata
- Class: Arachnida
- Order: Araneae
- Infraorder: Araneomorphae
- Family: Gnaphosidae
- Genus: Sergiolus; Simon, 1892

Type species
- S. capulatus (Walckenaer, 1837)

Species
- 21, see text

= Sergiolus =

Genus of spiders

Sergiolus is a genus of ground spiders that was first described by Eugène Simon in 1892. They are 3.3 to 9 millimetres (0.13 to 0.35 in) long.

== Species ==
As of January 2022 it contains twenty-one species:

- Sergiolus angustus (Banks, 1904) – North America
- Sergiolus bicolor Banks, 1900 – USA, Canada
- Sergiolus capulatus (Walckenaer, 1837) (type) – USA, Canada
- Sergiolus columbianus (Emerton, 1917) – USA, Canada
- Sergiolus cyaneiventris Simon, 1893 – USA, Cuba
- Sergiolus decoratus Kaston, 1945 – USA, Canada
- Sergiolus gertschi Platnick & Shadab, 1981 – USA, Mexico
- Sergiolus guadalupensis Platnick & Shadab, 1981 – Mexico
- Sergiolus hosiziro (Yaginuma, 1960) – China, Korea, Japan
- Sergiolus iviei Platnick & Shadab, 1981 – USA, Canada
- Sergiolus kastoni Platnick & Shadab, 1981 – USA, Cuba
- Sergiolus lowelli Chamberlin & Woodbury, 1929 – USA, Mexico
- Sergiolus magnus (Bryant, 1948) – Hispaniola
- Sergiolus mainlingensis Hu, 2001 – China
- Sergiolus minutus (Banks, 1898) – USA, Cuba, Jamaica
- Sergiolus montanus (Emerton, 1890) – North America
- Sergiolus ocellatus (Walckenaer, 1837) – USA, Canada
- Sergiolus songi Xu, 1991 – China
- Sergiolus stella Chamberlin, 1922 – USA, Mexico
- Sergiolus tennesseensis Chamberlin, 1922 – USA
- Sergiolus unimaculatus Emerton, 1915 – USA, Canada
