= Floricomus =

Floricomus Temporal range: Neogene– Present

Scientific classification
- Kingdom: Animalia
- Phylum: Arthropoda
- Subphylum: Chelicerata
- Class: Arachnida
- Order: Araneae
- Infraorder: Araneomorphae
- Family: Linyphiidae
- Genus: Floricomus; Crosby & Bishop, 1925

Type species
- F. rostratus (Emerton, 1882)

Species
- 13, see text

Genus of spiders

Floricomus is a genus of North American dwarf spiders that was first described by C. R. Crosby & S. C. Bishop in 1925.

== Species ==
As of May 2019 it contains thirteen species, found in Canada and the United States:

- Floricomus bishopi Ivie & Barrows, 1935 – USA
- Floricomus crosbyi Ivie & Barrows, 1935 – USA
- Floricomus littoralis Chamberlin & Ivie, 1935 – USA
- Floricomus mulaiki Gertsch & Davis, 1936 – USA
- Floricomus nasutus (Emerton, 1911) – USA
- Floricomus nigriceps (Banks, 1906) – USA
- Floricomus ornatulus Gertsch & Ivie, 1936 – USA
- Floricomus plumalis (Crosby, 1905) – USA
- Floricomus praedesignatus Bishop & Crosby, 1935 – USA, Canada
- Floricomus pythonicus Crosby & Bishop, 1925 – USA
- Floricomus rostratus (Emerton, 1882) (type) – USA
- Floricomus setosus Chamberlin & Ivie, 1944 – USA
- Floricomus tallulae Chamberlin & Ivie, 1944 – USA
