= Gnathonaroides =

Scientific classification
- Kingdom: Animalia
- Phylum: Arthropoda
- Subphylum: Chelicerata
- Class: Arachnida
- Order: Araneae
- Infraorder: Araneomorphae
- Family: Linyphiidae
- Genus: Gnathonaroides; Bishop & Crosby, 1938
- Species: G. pedalis

Binomial name
- Gnathonaroides pedalis (Emerton, 1923)

Genus of spiders

Gnathonaroides is a monotypic genus of North American dwarf spiders containing the single species, Gnathonaroides pedalis. It was first described by S. C. Bishop & C. R. Crosby in 1938, and has only been found in Canada and the United States.
