= Agnyphantes =

Scientific classification
- Kingdom: Animalia
- Phylum: Arthropoda
- Subphylum: Chelicerata
- Class: Arachnida
- Order: Araneae
- Infraorder: Araneomorphae
- Family: Linyphiidae
- Genus: Agnyphantes; Hull, 1932

Type species
- A. expunctus (O. Pickard-Cambridge, 1875)

Species
- A. arboreus (Emerton, 1915) – Canada; A. expunctus (O. Pickard-Cambridge, 1875) – Europe, Russia (Europe to Far East), China

Genus of spiders

Agnyphantes is a genus of dwarf spiders that was first described by J. E. Hull in 1932. As of May 2019 it contains only two species: A. arboreus and A. expunctus.
