= Orodrassus =

Scientific classification
- Kingdom: Animalia
- Phylum: Arthropoda
- Subphylum: Chelicerata
- Class: Arachnida
- Order: Araneae
- Infraorder: Araneomorphae
- Family: Gnaphosidae
- Genus: Orodrassus; Chamberlin, 1922

Type species
- O. coloradensis (Emerton, 1877)

Species
- O. assimilis (Banks, 1895) – USA; O. canadensis Platnick & Shadab, 1975 – USA, Canada; O. coloradensis (Emerton, 1877) – USA, Canada

Genus of spiders

Orodrassus is a genus of North American ground spiders that was first described by R. V. Chamberlin in 1922. As of May 2019 it contains only three species: O. assimilis, O. canadensis, and O. coloradensis.
