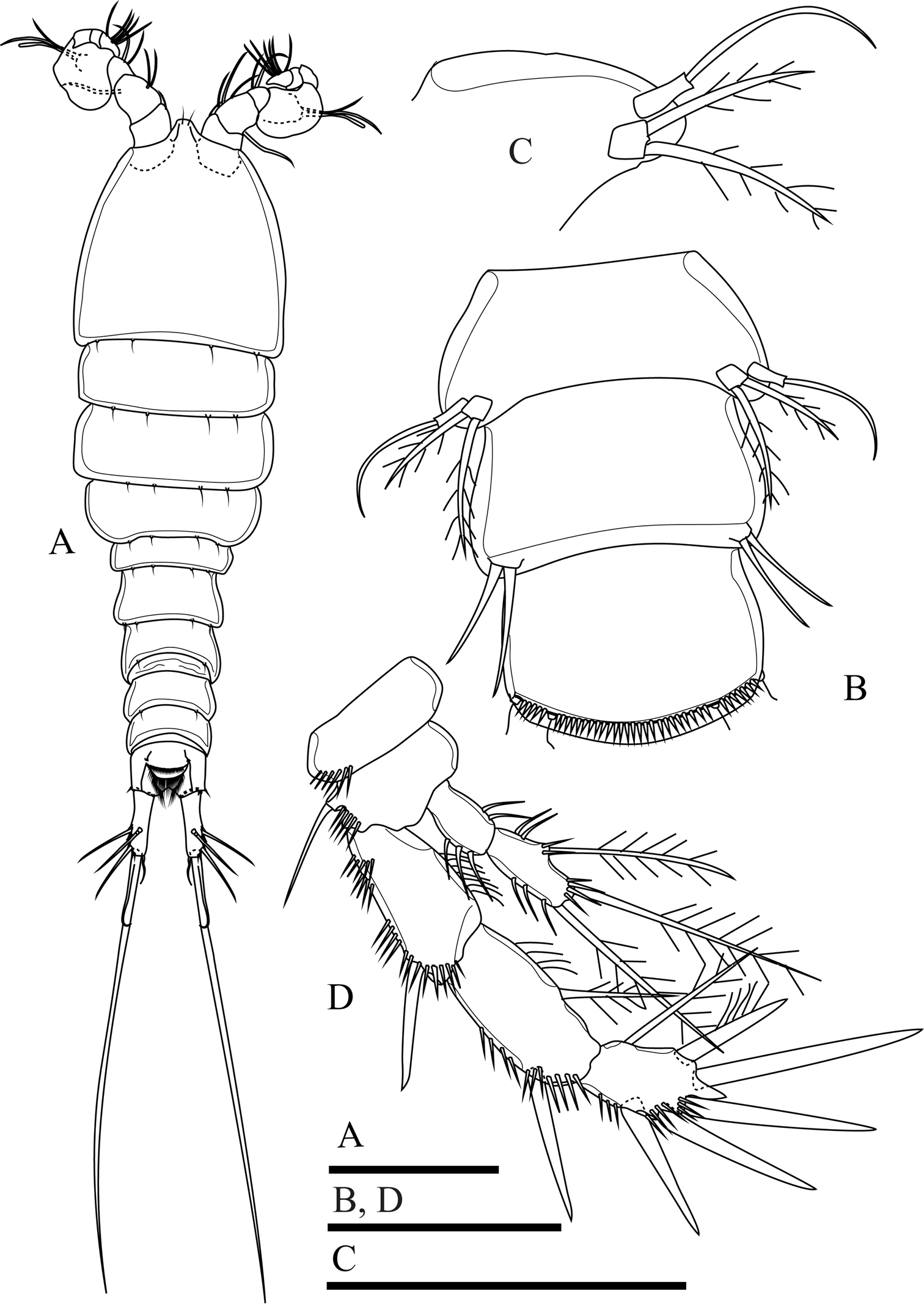
- Onychocamptus

Scientific classification
- Domain: Eukaryota
- Kingdom: Animalia
- Phylum: Arthropoda
- Class: Copepoda
- Order: Harpacticoida
- Family: Laophontidae
- Genus: Onychocamptus; Daday, 1903

= Onychocamptus =

Genus of crustaceans

Onychocamptus is a genus of copepods belonging to the family Laophontidae.

The species of this genus are found in Europe, Australia and Northern America.

Species:

- Onychocamptus anomalus (Ranga Reddy, 1984)
- Onychocamptus bengalensis (Sewell, 1934)
