= Leptastacidae =

Scientific classification
- Kingdom: Animalia
- Phylum: Arthropoda
- Clade: Pancrustacea
- Class: Copepoda
- Order: Harpacticoida
- Family: Leptastacidae

Family of crustaceans

Leptastacidae is a family of copepods belonging to the order Harpacticoida.

== Genera ==
Genera:

- Afroleptastacus Huys, 1992
- Aquilastacus Huys & Conroy-Dalton, 2005
- Archileptastacus Huys, 1992
