= Orthopsyllidae =

Scientific classification
- Domain: Eukaryota
- Kingdom: Animalia
- Phylum: Arthropoda
- Class: Copepoda
- Order: Harpacticoida
- Family: Orthopsyllidae

Family of crustaceans

Orthopsyllidae is a family of copepods belonging to the order Harpacticoida.

Genera:

- Orthopsyllus Brady & Robertson, 1873
