= Cletodidae =

Scientific classification
- Kingdom: Animalia
- Phylum: Arthropoda
- Clade: Pancrustacea
- Class: Copepoda
- Order: Harpacticoida
- Family: Cletodidae

Family of crustaceans

Cletodidae is a family of copepods belonging to the order Harpacticoida.

== Genera ==
Genera:

- Acrenhydrosoma Lang, 1944
- Australonannopus Hamond, 1974
- Barbaracletodes Huys, 2009
