= Hamondiidae =

Scientific classification
- Domain: Eukaryota
- Kingdom: Animalia
- Phylum: Arthropoda
- Class: Copepoda
- Order: Harpacticoida
- Family: Hamondiidae

Synonyms
- Ambunguipedidae

Family of crustaceans

Hamondiidae is a family of copepods belonging to the order Harpacticoida.

Genera:

- Ambunguipes Huys, 1990
- Hamondia Huys, 1990
- Lucayostratiotes Huys, 1990
