= Normanellidae =

Scientific classification
- Domain: Eukaryota
- Kingdom: Animalia
- Phylum: Arthropoda
- Class: Copepoda
- Order: Harpacticoida
- Family: Normanellidae

Family of crustaceans

Normanellidae is a family of copepods belonging to the order Harpacticoida.

Genera:

- Normanella Brady, 1880
- Paranaiara Kihara & Huys, 2009
- Pseudocletodes Scott & Scott, 1893
- Sagamiella Lee & Huys, 1999
