= Cristacoxidae =

Scientific classification
- Domain: Eukaryota
- Kingdom: Animalia
- Phylum: Arthropoda
- Class: Copepoda
- Order: Harpacticoida
- Family: Cristacoxidae

Family of crustaceans

Cristacoxidae is a family of crustaceans belonging to the order Harpacticoida.

Genera:

- Cubanocleta Petkovski, 1977
- Noodtorthopsyllus Lang, 1965
