= Laophontopsidae =

Scientific classification
- Domain: Eukaryota
- Kingdom: Animalia
- Phylum: Arthropoda
- Class: Copepoda
- Order: Harpacticoida
- Family: Laophontopsidae

Family of crustaceans

Laophontopsidae is a family of copepods belonging to the order Harpacticoida.

Genera:

- Aculeopsis Huys & Willems, 1989
- Laophontopsis Sars, 1908
- Telodocus Huys & Willems, 1989
