= Anthrobia monmouthia =

- Anthrobia monmouthia photographed in Mammoth Cave National Park, Kentucky

Conservation status
- Secure (NatureServe)

Scientific classification
- Kingdom: Animalia
- Phylum: Arthropoda
- Subphylum: Chelicerata
- Class: Arachnida
- Order: Araneae
- Infraorder: Araneomorphae
- Family: Linyphiidae
- Genus: Anthrobia
- Species: A. monmouthia

Binomial name
- Anthrobia monmouthia Tellkampf, 1844

Species of spider

Anthrobia monmouthia is a species of spider in the family Linyphiidae.

== Distribution ==
This species is native to North America and occurs in Alabama, Tennessee, Kentucky and Virginia.
