= Dactylopusiidae =

Scientific classification
- Domain: Eukaryota
- Kingdom: Animalia
- Phylum: Arthropoda
- Class: Copepoda
- Order: Harpacticoida
- Family: Dactylopusiidae

Family of crustaceans

Dactylopusiidae is a family of copepods belonging to the order Harpacticoida.

Genera:

- Dactylopodopsis Sars, 1911
- Dactylopusia Norman, 1903
- Dactylopusioides Brian, 1928
- Diarthrodes Thomson, 1883
- Paradactylopodia Lang, 1944
- Sewelliapusia Huys, 2009
