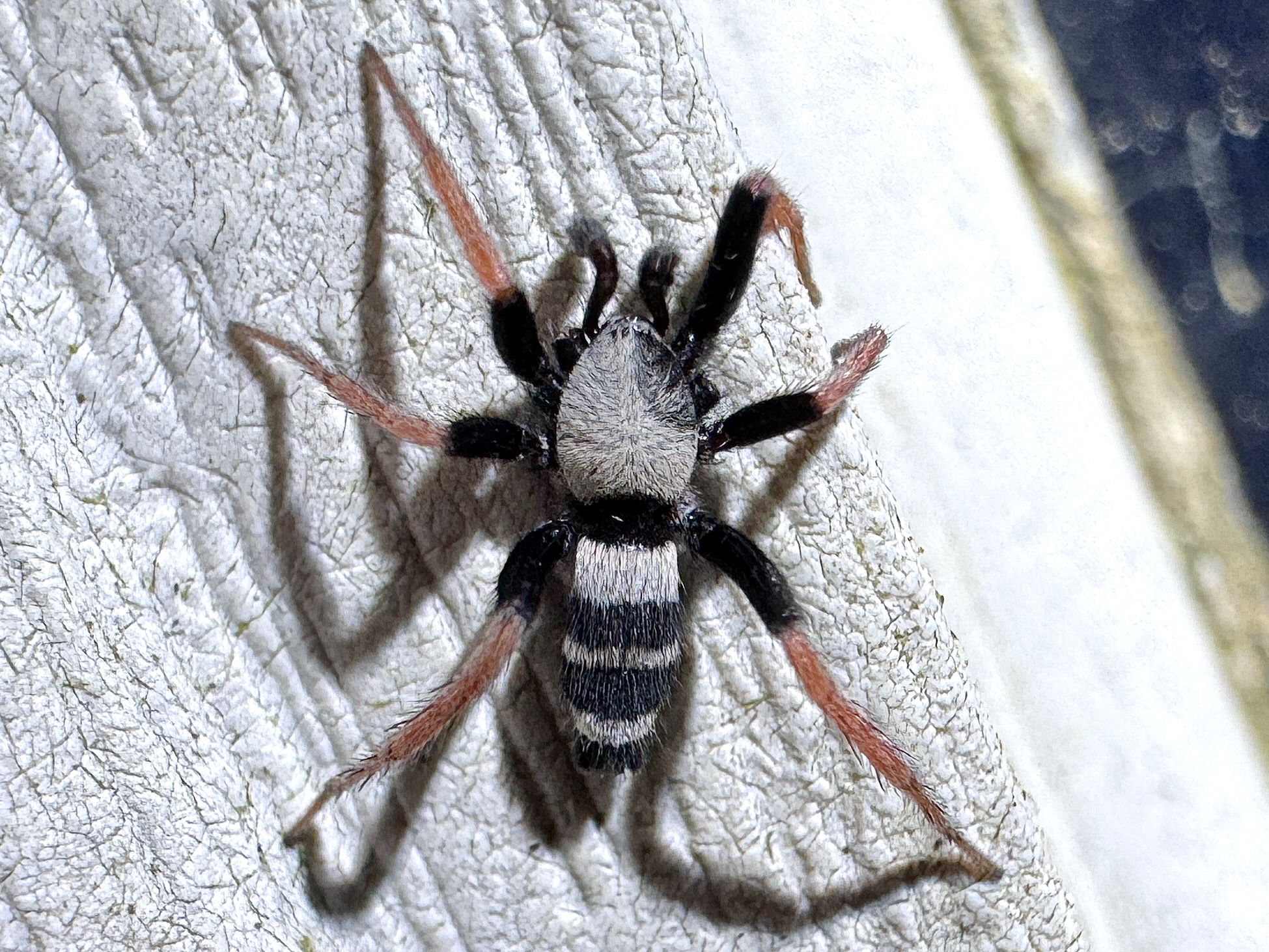

Scientific classification
- Kingdom: Animalia
- Phylum: Arthropoda
- Subphylum: Chelicerata
- Class: Arachnida
- Order: Araneae
- Infraorder: Araneomorphae
- Family: Gnaphosidae
- Genus: Sergiolus
- Species: S. tennesseensis

Binomial name
- Sergiolus tennesseensis Chamberlin, 1922

= Sergiolus tennesseensis =

Species of spider

Sergiolus tennesseensis is a species of ground spider in the family Gnaphosidae. It is found in the United States.
