= Nannopodidae =

Scientific classification
- Domain: Eukaryota
- Kingdom: Animalia
- Phylum: Arthropoda
- Class: Copepoda
- Order: Harpacticoida
- Family: Nannopodidae

Synonyms
- Huntemanniidae

Family of crustaceans

Nannopodidae is a family of copepods belonging to the order Harpacticoida.

Genera:

- Acuticoxa Huys & Kihara, 2010
- Concilicoxa Kim & Lee, 2020
- Doolia Lee, 2020
- Huntemannia Poppe, 1884
- Ilyophilus
- Laophontisochra George, 2002
- Nannopus Brady, 1880
- Pontopolites Scott, 1894
- Rosacletodes Wells, 1985
- Talpacoxa Corgosinho, 2012
