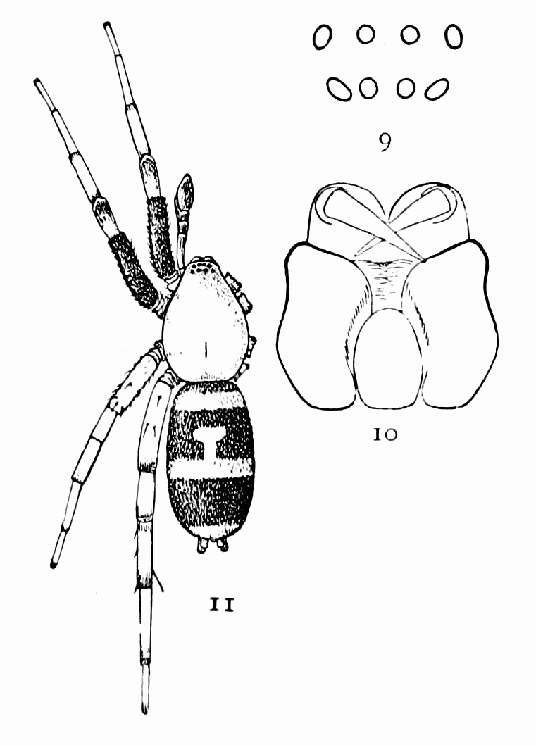

Scientific classification
- Kingdom: Animalia
- Phylum: Arthropoda
- Subphylum: Chelicerata
- Class: Arachnida
- Order: Araneae
- Infraorder: Araneomorphae
- Family: Gnaphosidae
- Genus: Sergiolus
- Species: S. capulatus

Binomial name
- Sergiolus capulatus (Walckenaer, 1837)

Synonyms
- Drassus capulatus Walckenaer, 1837; Herpyllus variegatus Hentz, 1847

= Sergiolus capulatus =

Species of spider

Sergiolus capulatus is a species of ground spider in the family Gnaphosidae. It is found in the United States and Canada.

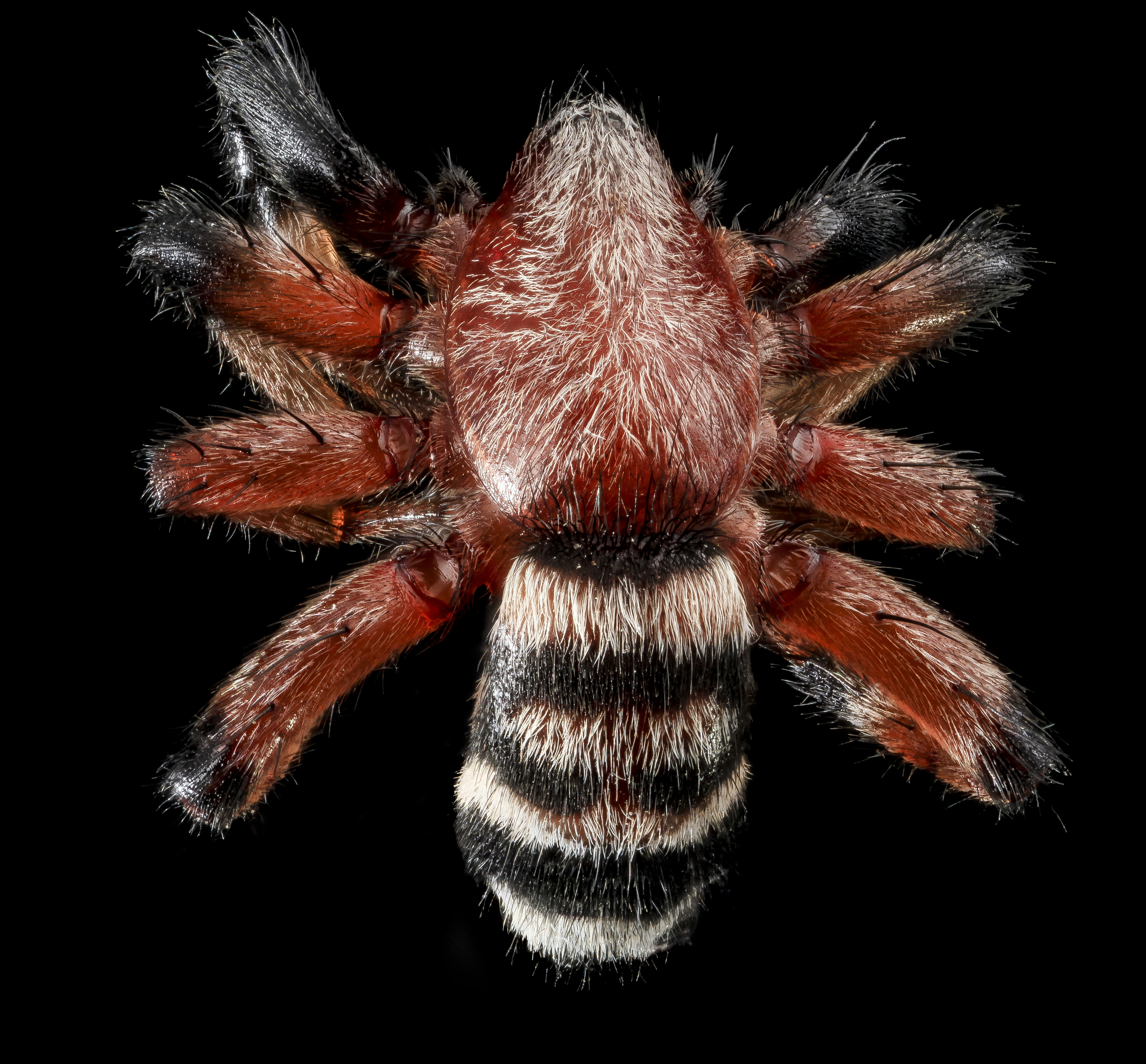
