= Cletopsyllidae =

Scientific classification
- Domain: Eukaryota
- Kingdom: Animalia
- Phylum: Arthropoda
- Class: Copepoda
- Order: Harpacticoida
- Family: Cletopsyllidae

Family of crustaceans

Cletopsyllidae is a family of crustaceans belonging to the order Harpacticoida.

Genera:

- Bathycletopsyllus Huys & Lee, 1999
- Cletopsyllus Willey, 1935
- Isocletopsyllus Huys & Lee, 1999
- Pentacletopsyllus Bang, Baguley & Moon, 2014
- Pseudocletopsyllus Vervoort, 1964
- Retrocalcar Huys & Lee, 1999
