= Pseudotachidiidae =

Scientific classification
- Kingdom: Animalia
- Phylum: Arthropoda
- Clade: Pancrustacea
- Class: Copepoda
- Order: Harpacticoida
- Family: Pseudotachidiidae

Family of crustaceans

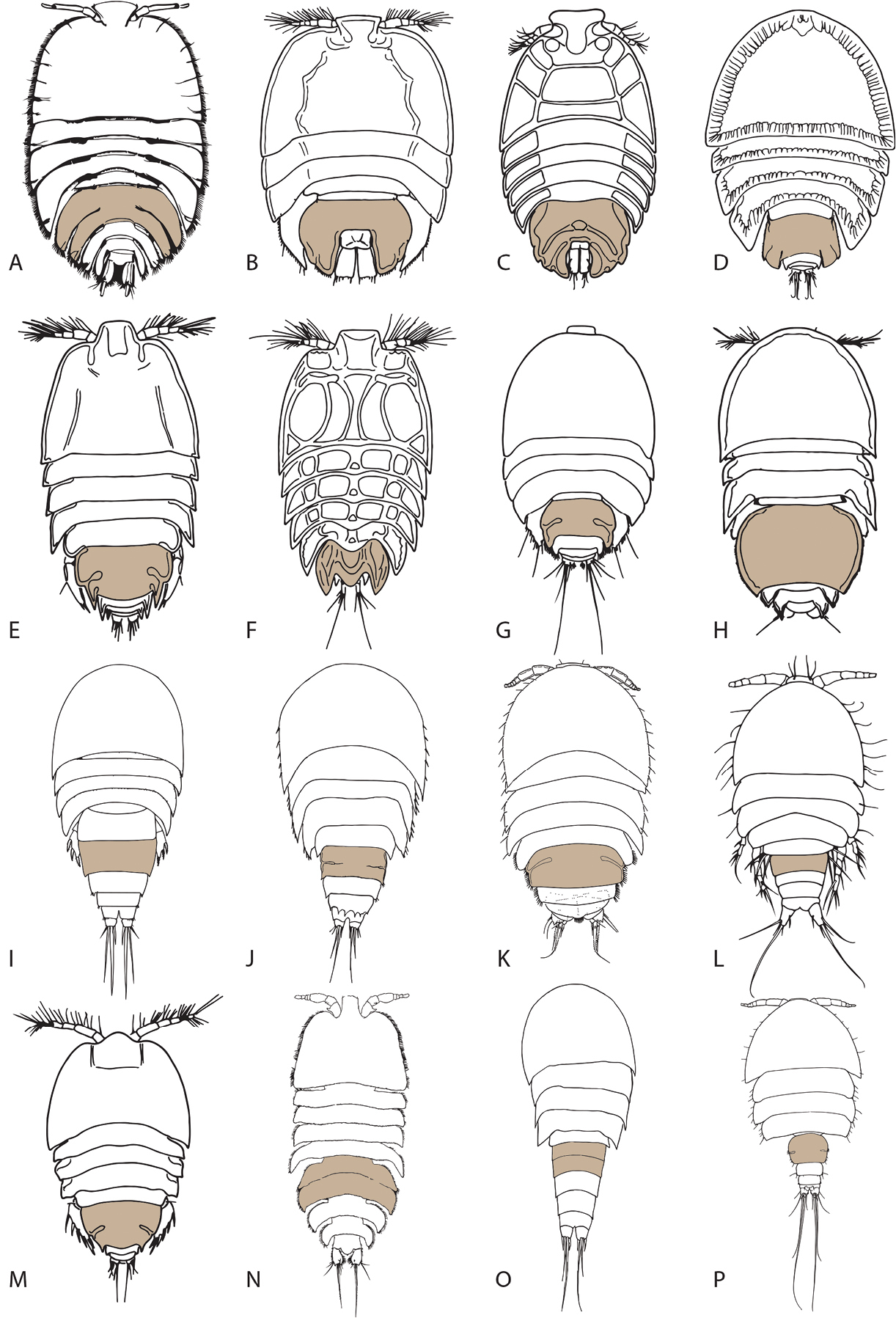
Harpacticoid copepods

Pseudotachidiidae is a family of crustaceans belonging to the order Harpacticoida.

== Genera ==
Genera:

- Afrosenia Huys & Gee, 1996
- Anapophysia Huys & Gee, 1996
- Apodonsiella Hicks, 1988
