= Rotundiclipeus =

Scientific classification
- Domain: Eukaryota
- Kingdom: Animalia
- Phylum: Arthropoda
- Class: Copepoda
- Order: Harpacticoida
- Family: Rotundiclipeidae
- Genus: Rotundiclipeus; Huys, 1988
- Species: R. canariensis

Binomial name
- Rotundiclipeus canariensis Huys, 1988

Genus of crustaceans

Rotundiclipeus is a monotypic genus of crustaceans belonging to the monotypic family Rotundiclipeidae. The only species is Rotundiclipeus canariensis.

The species is found in Canary Islands.
