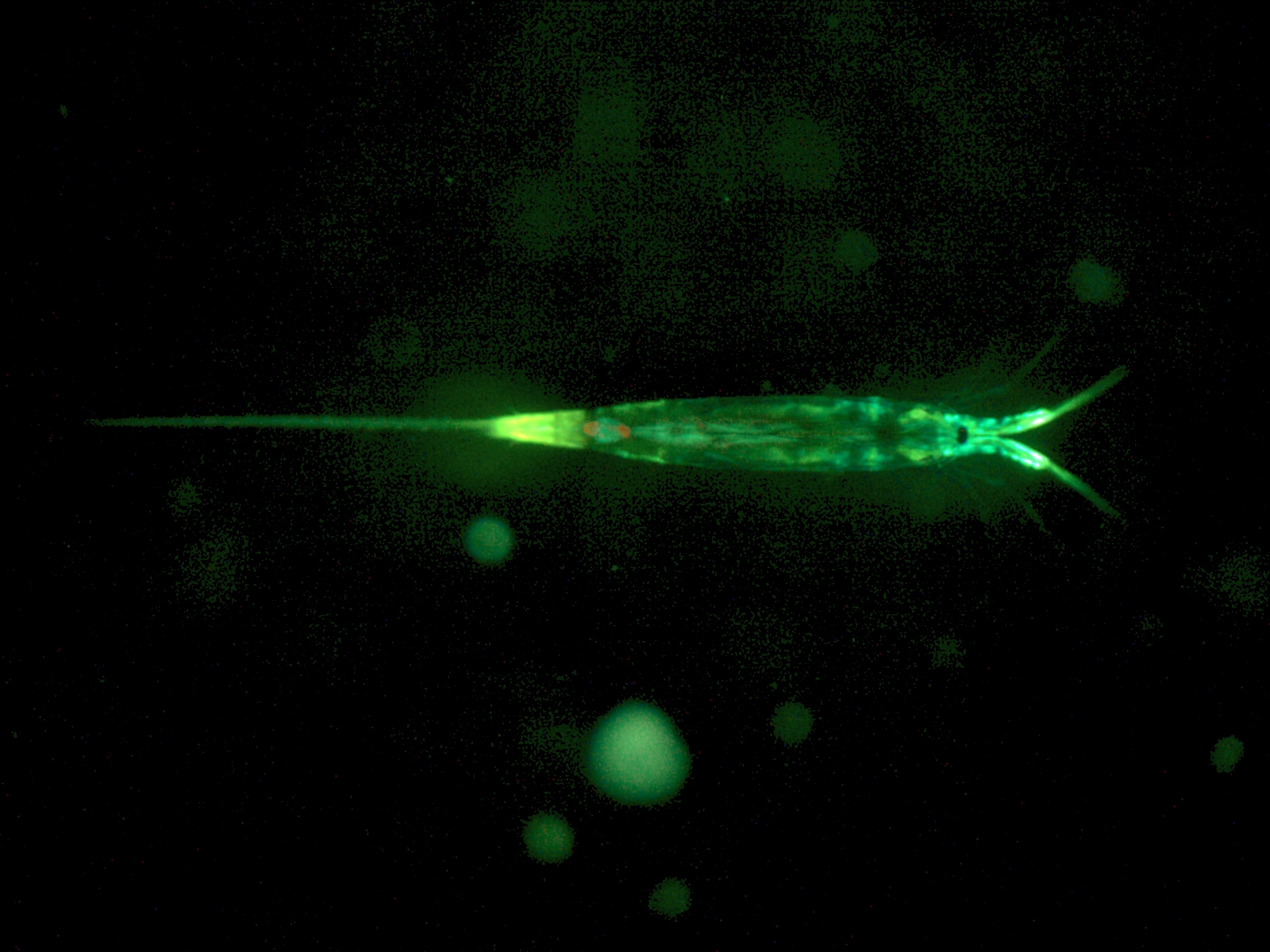
- Microsetella spp.

Scientific classification
- Kingdom: Animalia
- Phylum: Arthropoda
- Clade: Pancrustacea
- Class: Copepoda
- Order: Harpacticoida
- Family: Ectinosomatidae; G. O. Sars, 1903

Synonyms
- Ectinosomidae

= Ectinosomatidae =

Family of crustaceans

Ectinosomatidae is a family of the Harpacticoida, a huge group of crustaceans belonging to the subclass Copepoda. Like most of their relatives, they are usually benthic inhabitants of marine environments. Ectinosomatidae commonly inhabit sediment and fragments of dead corals or glass sponges, and occasionally algae and bryozoans, in the deep oceans. In the epifaunal species, the first leg pair is often modified to allow the animals a better grip on the substrate.

== Genera ==
More than 20 genera are included in the family:

- Arenosetella C. B. Wilson, 1932
- Bradya Boeck, 1872
- Bradyellopsis Brian, 1923
- Chaulionyx Kihara & Huys, 2009
- Ectinosoma Boeck, 1865 (including Helectinsoma)
- Ectinosomella G. O. Sars, 1910
- Ectinosomoides Nicholls, 1945
- Glabrotelson Huys in Kihara & Huys, 2009
- Halectinosoma Lang, 1944 (including Pararenosetella)
- Halophytophilus Brian, 1919 (including Alophytophilus)
- Hastigerella Nicholls, 1935
- Klieosoma Hicks & Schriever, 1985
- Microsetella Brady & Robertson, 1873
- Noodtiella Wells, 1965 (including Lineosoma)
- Oikopus Wells, 1967
- Parabradya Lang, 1944
- Peltobradya Médioni & Soyer, 1967
- Pseudectinosoma Kunz, 1935
- Pseudobradya G. O. Sars, 1904
- Rangabradya Karanovic & Pesce, 2001
- Sigmatidium Giesbrecht, 1881
- Tetanopsis Brady, 1910
