= Novocriniidae =

Scientific classification
- Domain: Eukaryota
- Kingdom: Animalia
- Phylum: Arthropoda
- Class: Copepoda
- Order: Harpacticoida
- Family: Novocriniidae

Family of crustaceans

Novocriniidae is a family of crustaceans belonging to the order Harpacticoida.

Genera:

- Atergopedia Martínez Arbizu & Moura, 1998
- Novocrinia Huys & Iliffe, 1998
