= Chappuisius =

Scientific classification
- Domain: Eukaryota
- Kingdom: Animalia
- Phylum: Arthropoda
- Class: Copepoda
- Order: Harpacticoida
- Family: Chappuisiidae
- Genus: Chappuisius; Kiefer, 1938

Genus of crustaceans

Chappuisius is a genus of crustaceans belonging to the monotypic family Chappuisiidae.

The species of this genus are found in Central Europe.

Species:

- Chappuisius inopinus Kiefer, 1938
- Chappuisius singeri Chappuis, 1940
