= Tisbidae =

Scientific classification
- Domain: Eukaryota
- Kingdom: Animalia
- Phylum: Arthropoda
- Class: Copepoda
- Order: Harpacticoida
- Family: Tisbidae

Family of crustaceans

Tisbidae is a family of copepods belonging to the order Harpacticoida.

Genera:

- Amplipedicola Avdeev, 2010
- Aspinothorax Moura & Martínez Arbizu, 2004
- Avdeevia Bresciani & Lützen, 1994
- Bathyidia Farran, 1926
- Brescianiana Avdeev, 1982
- Cholidya Farran, 1914
- Cholidyella Avdeev, 1982
- Drescheriella Dahms & Dieckmann, 1987
- Genesis Lopez-González, Bresciani & Huys, 2000
- Idyanthopsis Bocquet & Bozic, 1955
- Neotisbella Boxshall, 1979
- Octopinella Avdeev, 1986
- Paraidya Huys, 2009
- Sacodiscus Wilson, 1924
- Scutellidium Claus, 1866
- Tachidiella Sars, 1911
- Tachydiopsis Sars, 1911
- Tisbe Lilljeborg, 1853
- Tisbella Gurney, 1927
- Tisbintra Sewell, 1940
- Tripartisoma Avdeev, 1983
- Volkmannia Boxshall, 1979
- Vulcanoctopusi López-González, Bresciani, Huys, González, Guerra & Pascual, 2000
- Yunona Avdeev, 1983
