= Adenopleurellidae =

Scientific classification
- Domain: Eukaryota
- Kingdom: Animalia
- Phylum: Arthropoda
- Class: Copepoda
- Order: Harpacticoida
- Family: Adenopleurellidae

Family of crustaceans

Adenopleurellidae is a family of crustaceans belonging to the order Harpacticoida.

Genera:

- Adenopleurella Huys, 1990
- Proceropes Huys, 1990
- Sarsocletodes Wilson, 1924
