= Tetragonicipitidae =

Scientific classification
- Kingdom: Animalia
- Phylum: Arthropoda
- Class: Copepoda
- Order: Harpacticoida
- Family: Tetragonicipitidae

Synonyms
- Tetragonicepsidae

Family of crustaceans

Tetragonicipitidae is a family of copepods belonging to the order Harpacticoida.

== Genera ==
Genera:

- Adoginiceps Gómez & Morales-Serna, 2015
- Aigondiceps Fiers, 1995
- Anguloceps Fiers & Iliffe, 1999
- Diagoniceps Willey, 1930
- Godianiceps Fiers, 1995
- Gonianiceps
- Laophontella Thompson I.C. & Scott A., 1903
- Mwania Fiers & de Troch, 2000
- Neogoniceps Fiers & de Troch, 2000
- Odaginiceps Fiers, 1995
- Oniscopsis Chappuis, 1954
- Paraschizopera Wells, 1981
- Phyllopodopsyllus Scott T., 1906
- Phyllopodpsyllus Scott T., 1906
- Protogoniceps Por, 1964
- Pteropsyllus Scott T., 1906
- Tarengoticeps Gómez & Morales-Serna, 2015
- Tetragoniceps Brady & Robertson, 1876
