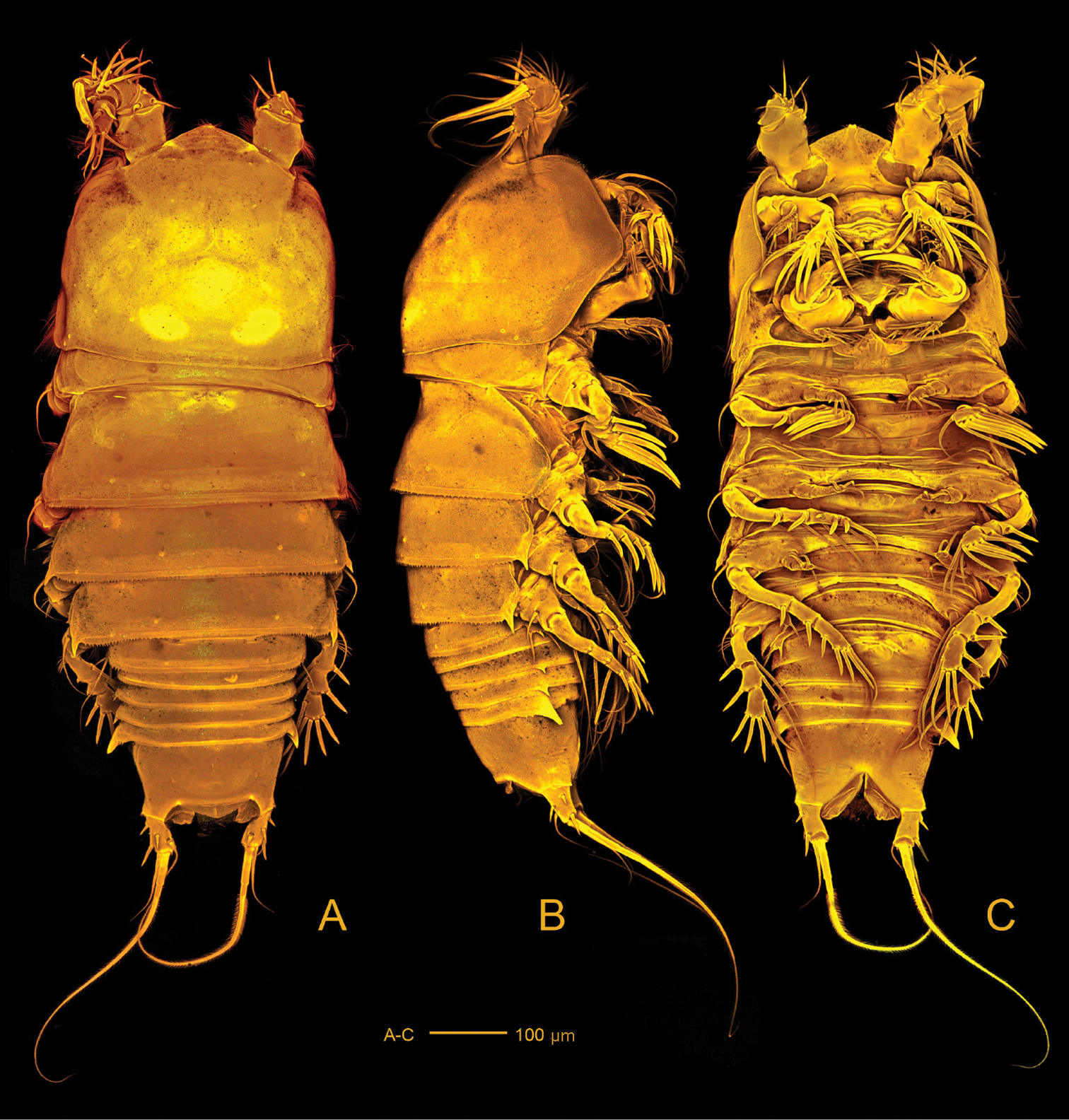

Scientific classification
- Kingdom: Animalia
- Phylum: Arthropoda
- Clade: Pancrustacea
- Class: Copepoda
- Order: Harpacticoida
- Family: Aegisthidae

Synonyms
- Cerviniidae

= Aegisthidae =

Family of crustaceans

Aegisthidae is a family of copepods belonging to the order Harpacticoida. Many Aegisthidae are hyperbenthic.

== Genera ==
Aegisthidae contains the following genera:

=== Subfamily Aegisthinae ===
- Aegisthus Giesbrecht, 1891
- Andromastax Conroy-Dalton & Huys, 1999
- Jamstecia Lee W. & Huys, 2000
- Nudivorax Lee W. & Huys, 2000
- Scabrantenna Lee W. & Huys, 2000
- Ameliotes Por, 1969
- Arcticocarella Kornev & Chertoprud, 2008

=== Subfamily Cerviniellinae ===
- Cerviniella Smirnov, 1946
- Eucanuella Scott T., 1901
- Hase Corgosinho, Kihara, Schizas, Ostmann, Martínez Arbizu & Ivanenko, 2018

=== Subfamily Cerviniinae ===
- Cervinia Norman in Brady, 1878
- Expansicervinia Montagna, 1981
- Frisia George & Viertel, 2020
- Paracerviniella Brodsky, 1963

=== Subfamily Cerviniopseinae ===
- Cerviniopsis Sars G.O., 1903
- Hemicervinia Lang, 1935
- Herdmaniopsis Brotskaya, 1963
- Siphonis Mercado-Salas, Khodami & Martínez Arbizu, 2019
- Stratiopontotes Soyer, 1970
- Tonpostratiotes Itô Tat., 1982
