= Thompsonulidae =

Scientific classification
- Domain: Eukaryota
- Kingdom: Animalia
- Phylum: Arthropoda
- Class: Copepoda
- Order: Harpacticoida
- Family: Thompsonulidae

Family of crustaceans

Thompsonulidae is a family of copepods belonging to the order Harpacticoida.

Genera:

- Caribbula Huys & Gee, 1990
- Thompsonula Scott, 1905
