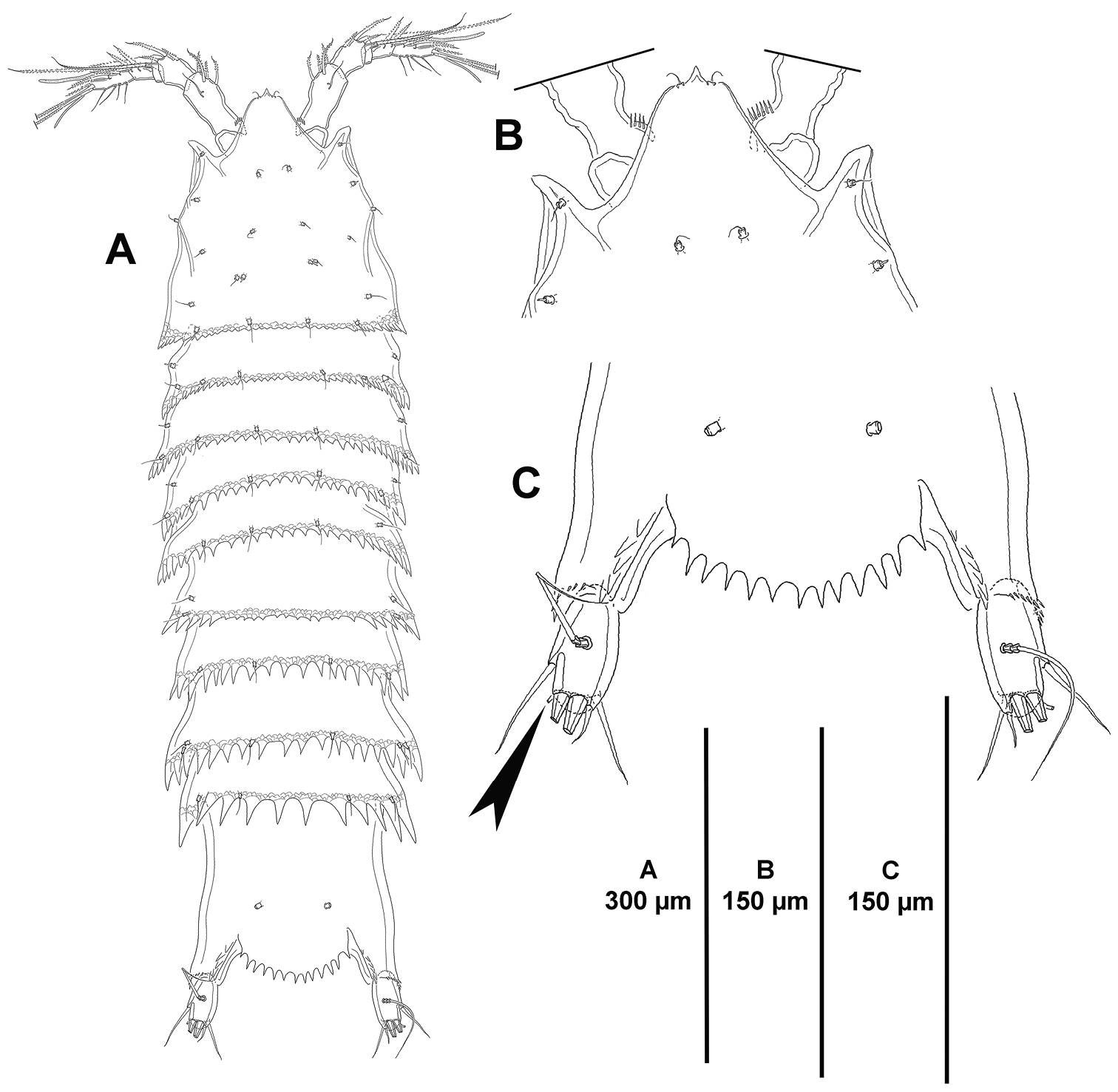

Scientific classification
- Domain: Eukaryota
- Kingdom: Animalia
- Phylum: Arthropoda
- Class: Copepoda
- Order: Harpacticoida
- Family: Argestidae

= Argestidae =

Family of crustaceans

Argestidae is a family of copepods belonging to the order Harpacticoida.

Genera:

- Actinocletodes Fiers, 1986
- Argestes Sars, 1910
- Argestigens Willey, 1935
