= Orodrassus canadensis =

Scientific classification
- Kingdom: Animalia
- Phylum: Arthropoda
- Subphylum: Chelicerata
- Class: Arachnida
- Order: Araneae
- Infraorder: Araneomorphae
- Family: Gnaphosidae
- Genus: Orodrassus
- Species: O. canadensis

Binomial name
- Orodrassus canadensis Platnick & Shadab, 1975

Species of spider

Orodrassus canadensis is a species of ground spider in the family Gnaphosidae. It is found in the United States and Canada.
