= Sergiolus gertschi =

Scientific classification
- Kingdom: Animalia
- Phylum: Arthropoda
- Subphylum: Chelicerata
- Class: Arachnida
- Order: Araneae
- Infraorder: Araneomorphae
- Family: Gnaphosidae
- Genus: Sergiolus
- Species: S. gertschi

Binomial name
- Sergiolus gertschi Platnick & Shadab, 1981

Species of spider

Sergiolus gertschi is a species of ground spider in the family Gnaphosidae. It is found in the USA and Mexico.
