= Sergiolus columbianus =

Scientific classification
- Domain: Eukaryota
- Kingdom: Animalia
- Phylum: Arthropoda
- Subphylum: Chelicerata
- Class: Arachnida
- Order: Araneae
- Infraorder: Araneomorphae
- Family: Gnaphosidae
- Genus: Sergiolus
- Species: S. columbianus

Binomial name
- Sergiolus columbianus (Emerton, 1917)

Synonyms
- Poecilochroa columbiana Emerton, 1917

Species of spider

Sergiolus columbianus is a species of ground spider in the family Gnaphosidae. It is found in the United States and Canada.
