= Orodrassus coloradensis =

Scientific classification
- Domain: Eukaryota
- Kingdom: Animalia
- Phylum: Arthropoda
- Subphylum: Chelicerata
- Class: Arachnida
- Order: Araneae
- Infraorder: Araneomorphae
- Family: Gnaphosidae
- Genus: Orodrassus
- Species: O. coloradensis

Binomial name
- Orodrassus coloradensis (Emerton, 1877)

Synonyms
- Drassodes melius Chamberlin, 1919; Drassus coloradensis Emerton, 1877; Teminius continentalis Keyserling, 1887

Species of spider

Orodrassus coloradensis is a species of ground spider in the family Gnaphosidae. It is found in the United States and Canada.
