= Metidae =

- genus Metis

Scientific classification
- Kingdom: Animalia
- Phylum: Arthropoda
- Clade: Pancrustacea
- Class: Copepoda
- Order: Harpacticoida
- Family: Metidae

Family of crustaceans

Metidae is a family of copepods belonging to the order Harpacticoida.

Genera:

- Ilyopsilla
- Lauberia
- Laubieria Soyer, 1966
- Metis Philippi, 1843
