= Leptocaris =

Scientific classification
- Kingdom: Animalia
- Phylum: Arthropoda
- Class: Copepoda
- Order: Harpacticoida
- Family: Darcythompsoniidae
- Genus: Leptocaris; T. Scott, 1899

Synonyms
- Horsiella Gurney, 1920; Thaumastognatha Jakobi, 1954

Genus of crustaceans

Leptocaris is a genus of copepods in the family Darcythompsoniidae. One species, the Mexican endemic L. stromatolicolus, is included on the IUCN Red List as a vulnerable species. The genus contains the following species:

- Leptocaris adriatica Petkovski, 1955
- Leptocaris armatus Lang, 1965
- Leptocaris azoricus Kunz, 1983
- Leptocaris biscayensis (Noodt, 1955)
- Leptocaris brevicornis (van Douwe, 1905)
- Leptocaris canariensis Lang, 1965
- Leptocaris doughertyi Lang, 1965
- Leptocaris echinatus Fiers, 1986
- Leptocaris elishevae (Por, 1968)
- Leptocaris glaber Fiers, 1986
- Leptocaris gurneyi (Nicholls, 1944)
- Leptocaris ignavus (Noodt, 1953)
- Leptocaris igneus Cottarelli & Baldari, 1982
- Leptocaris insularis (Noodt, 1958)
- Leptocaris islandica Apostolov, 2007
- Leptocaris itoi Kunz, 1994
- Leptocaris kunzi Fleeger & Clark, 1980
- Leptocaris mangalis Por, 1983
- Leptocaris marinus (Por, 1964)
- Leptocaris minima (Noodt, 1958)
- Leptocaris minimus (Jakobi, 1954)
- Leptocaris minutus T. Scott, 1899
- Leptocaris mucronatus Fiers, 1986
- Leptocaris noodti Kunz, 1994
- Leptocaris pori Lang, 1965
- Leptocaris ryukyuensis Song et al., 2012
- Leptocaris sibirica Borutsky, 1952
- Leptocaris stromatolicolus Zamudio-Valdés & Reid, 1990
- Leptocaris trisetosus (Kunz, 1935)
- Leptocaris vermiculatus (Oliveira, 1957)
