= Rhizotrichidae =

Scientific classification
- Kingdom: Animalia
- Phylum: Arthropoda
- Clade: Pancrustacea
- Class: Copepoda
- Order: Harpacticoida
- Family: Rhizotrichidae

Synonyms
- Rhizothricidae

Family of crustaceans

Rhizotrichidae is a family of crustaceans belonging to the order Harpacticoida.

Genera:

- Rhizothrix Sars, 1909
- Tryphoema Monard, 1926
