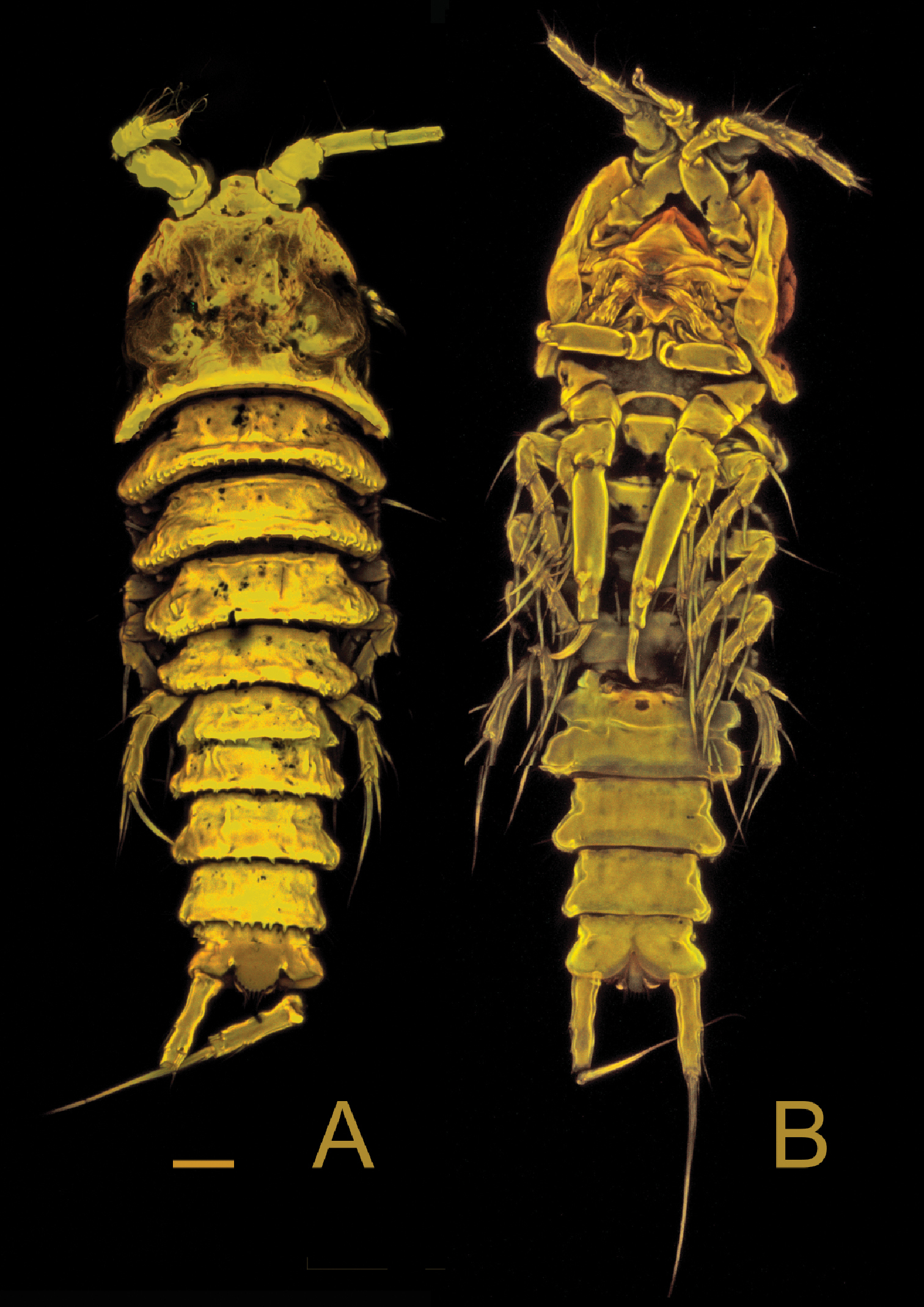

Scientific classification
- Kingdom: Animalia
- Phylum: Arthropoda
- Clade: Pancrustacea
- Class: Copepoda
- Order: Harpacticoida
- Family: Ancorabolidae

= Ancorabolidae =

Family of crustaceans

Ancorabolidae is a family of copepods belonging to the order Harpacticoida.

== Genera ==
Ancorabolidae contains three genera:

- Algensiella Cottarelli & Baldari, 1987
- Ancorabolina George, 2006
- Ancorabolus Norman, 1903
