= Superornatiremidae =

Scientific classification
- Domain: Eukaryota
- Kingdom: Animalia
- Phylum: Arthropoda
- Class: Copepoda
- Order: Harpacticoida
- Family: Superornatiremidae

Family of crustaceans

Superornatiremidae is a family of crustaceans belonging to the order Harpacticoida.

Genera:

- Gideonia George & Martínez Arbizu, 2005
- Intercrusia Huys, 1996
- Neoechinophora Huys, 1996
- Superornatiremis Huys, 1996
