= Louriniidae =

Scientific classification
- Domain: Eukaryota
- Kingdom: Animalia
- Phylum: Arthropoda
- Class: Copepoda
- Order: Harpacticoida
- Family: Louriniidae

Family of crustaceans

Louriniidae is a family of crustaceans belonging to the order Harpacticoida.

Genera:

- Archeolourinia Corgosinho & Schizas, 2013
- Ceyloniella
- Lourinia Wilson, 1924
