= Latiremidae =

Scientific classification
- Domain: Eukaryota
- Kingdom: Animalia
- Phylum: Arthropoda
- Class: Copepoda
- Order: Harpacticoida
- Family: Latiremidae

Family of crustaceans

Latiremidae is a family of crustaceans belonging to the order Harpacticoida.

Genera:

- Arbutifera Huys & Kunz, 1988
- Delamarella Chappuis, 1954
