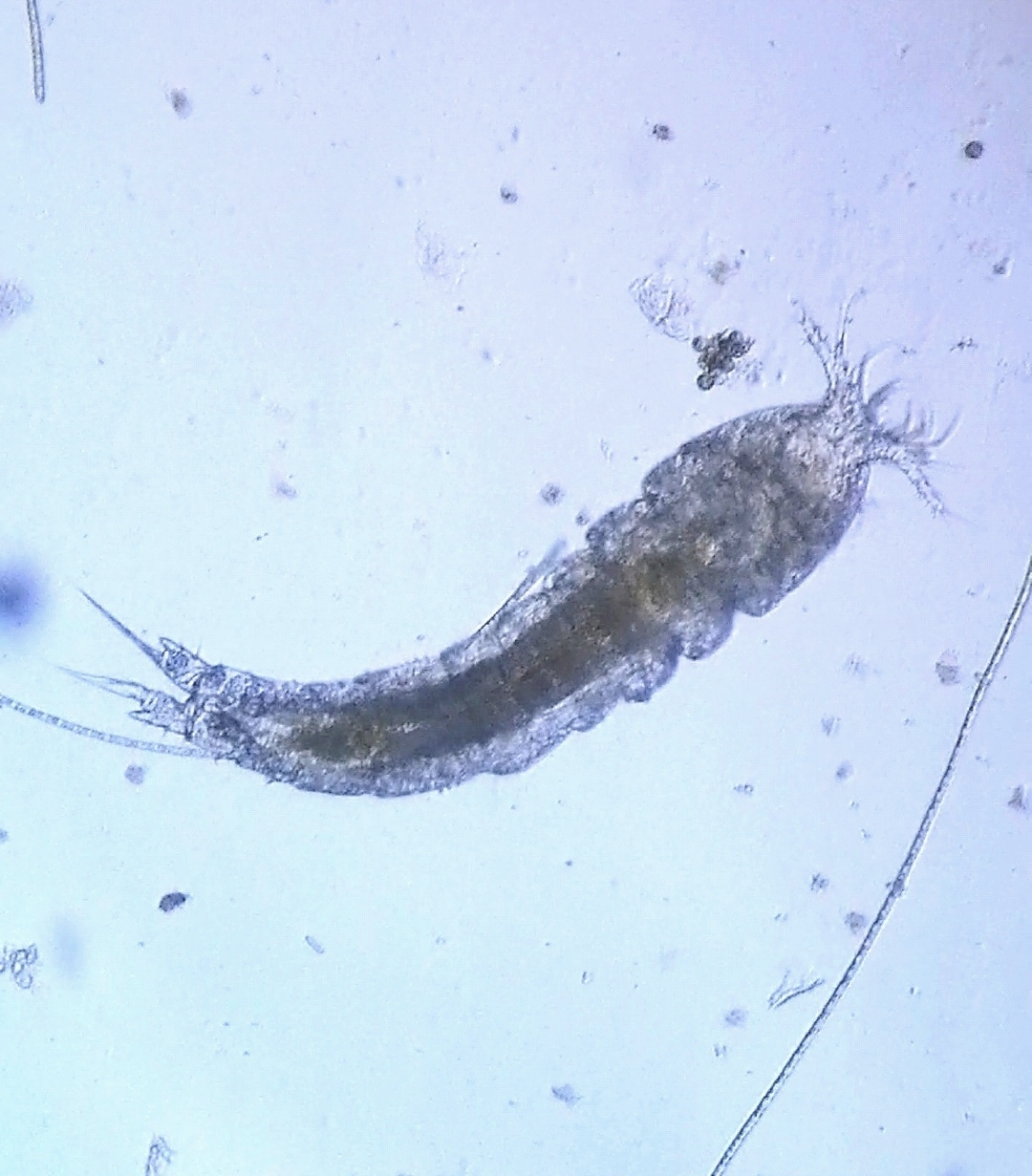
- Phyllognathopus viguieri

Scientific classification
- Kingdom: Animalia
- Phylum: Arthropoda
- Class: Copepoda
- Order: Harpacticoida
- Family: Phyllognathopodidae; Gurney, 1932

= Phyllognathopodidae =

Family of crustaceans

Phyllognathopodidae is a family of crustaceans belonging to the order Harpacticoida.

Genera:

- Allophyllognathopus Kiefer, 1967
- Neophyllognathopus Galassi & De Laurentiis, 2011
- Parbatocamptus Dumont & Maas, 1988
- Phyllognathopus Mrázek, 1893
