= Sergiolus ocellatus =

Scientific classification
- Domain: Eukaryota
- Kingdom: Animalia
- Phylum: Arthropoda
- Subphylum: Chelicerata
- Class: Arachnida
- Order: Araneae
- Infraorder: Araneomorphae
- Family: Gnaphosidae
- Genus: Sergiolus
- Species: S. ocellatus

Binomial name
- Sergiolus ocellatus (Walckenaer, 1837)

Synonyms
- Drassus ocellatus Walckenaer, 1837; Sergiolus decipiens Chamberlin, 1922

Species of spider

Sergiolus ocellatus is a species of ground spider in the family Gnaphosidae. It is found in the United States and Canada.
