= Neobradyidae =

Scientific classification
- Domain: Eukaryota
- Kingdom: Animalia
- Phylum: Arthropoda
- Class: Copepoda
- Order: Harpacticoida
- Family: Neobradyidae

Family of crustaceans

Neobradyidae is a family of crustaceans belonging to the order Harpacticoida.

Genera:

- Antarcticobradya Huys, 1987
- Marsteinia Drzycimski, 1968
- Neobradya Scott, 1892
- Tachidiopsis Sars, 1911
