= Thalestridae =

Scientific classification
- Kingdom: Animalia
- Phylum: Arthropoda
- Clade: Pancrustacea
- Class: Copepoda
- Order: Harpacticoida
- Family: Thalestridae

Family of crustaceans

Thalestridae is a family of copepods belonging to the order Harpacticoida.

== Genera ==
The family Thalestridae includes two sub-families:

- Eudactlylopusinae:
  - genus Eudactylopus Scott, 1909
  - genus Neodactylopus
- Thalestrinae
  - genus Amenophia Boeck, 1865
  - genus Paramenophia
  - genus Parathalestris
  - genus Phyllothalestris
  - genus Phroso
  - genus Rhynchothalestris
  - genus Thalestris
  - genus Frucitrogus

And the following Genera:

- Dactylopodella
- Dactylopodia
- Dactylopodopsis
- Dactylopusia
- Dactylopusioides
- Donsiella
- Mawsonella
- Metaphroso
- Microthalestris
- Peltthestris
- Marionobiotus Chappuis, 1940
