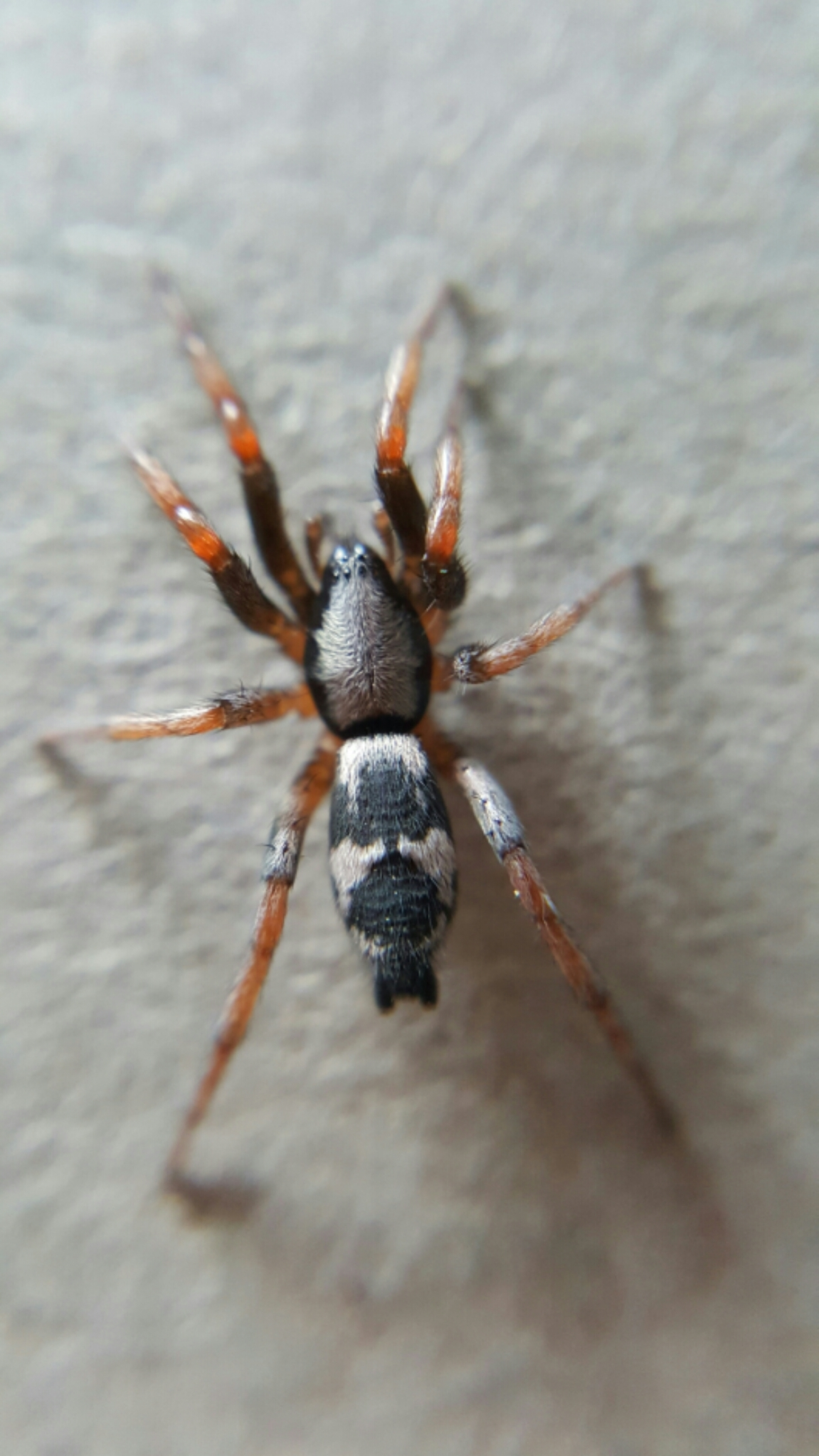

Scientific classification
- Domain: Eukaryota
- Kingdom: Animalia
- Phylum: Arthropoda
- Subphylum: Chelicerata
- Class: Arachnida
- Order: Araneae
- Infraorder: Araneomorphae
- Family: Gnaphosidae
- Genus: Sergiolus
- Species: S. montanus

Binomial name
- Sergiolus montanus (Emerton, 1890)

Synonyms
- Poecilochroa abjecta Chamberlin, 1936; Poecilochroa montana Emerton, 1890; Poecilochroa montanoides Schenkel, 1950; Poecilochroa pacifica Banks, 1896

= Sergiolus montanus =

Species of spider

Sergiolus montanus is a species of ground spider in the family Gnaphosidae. It is found in North America.
