= Porcellidiidae =

Scientific classification
- Kingdom: Animalia
- Phylum: Arthropoda
- Class: Copepoda
- Order: Harpacticoida
- Family: Porcellidiidae

Family of crustaceans

Porcellidiidae is a family of copepods belonging to the order Harpacticoida.

== Genera ==
Genera accepted on WoRMS as of October 2023:

- Brevifrons Harris V.A., 1994
- Cereudorsum Harris V.A., 2014
- Clavigofera Harris V.A. & Iwasaki, 1996
- Clunia Harris V.A., 2014
- Dilatatiocauda Harris V.A., 2002
- Geddesia Harris V.A., 2014
- Kensakia Harris V.A. & Iwasaki, 1997
- Kioloaria Harris V.A., 1994
- Kushia Harris V.A. & Iwasaki, 1996
- Mucrorostrum Harris V.A. & Iwasaki, 1997
- Murramia Huys, 2016
- Porcellidium Claus, 1860
- Porcelloides Harris V.A., 2014
- Ravania Harris V.A., 2014
- Synurus Harris V.A., 2014
- Tectacingulum Huys, 2009
