= Emertonia =

Scientific classification
- Kingdom: Animalia
- Phylum: Arthropoda
- Clade: Pancrustacea
- Class: Copepoda
- Order: Harpacticoida
- Family: Paramesochridae
- Genus: Emertonia; Wilson C.B., 1932

Species
- See text

Synonyms
- Kleiopsyllus Kunz, 1962; Kliopsyllus Kunz, 1962; Krishnapsyllus Kunz, 1974

Genus of crustaceans

Emertonia is a genus of copepods in the family Paramesochridae.

== Species ==
- Emertonia acutata (Klie, 1935)
- Emertonia acutifurcata (Mielke, 1985)
- Emertonia atlantica (Kunz, 1983)
- Emertonia berndi Mathiske & Veit-Köhler, 2021
- Emertonia brevicaudatua (Kornev & Chertoprud, 2008)
- Emertonia californica (Kunz, 1981)
- Emertonia capensis Krishnaswamy, 1957
- Emertonia chilensis (Mielke, 1985)
- Emertonia clausi Pointer & Veit-Köhler, 2013 In: Pointer, Kihara, Glatzel & Veit-Köhler, 2013
- Emertonia coelebs (Monard, 1935)
- Emertonia constricta (Nicholls, 1935)
- Emertonia debilis (Kunz, 1981)
- Emertonia diva (Veit-Köhler, 2005)
- Emertonia enalia (Krishnaswamy, 1957)
- Emertonia furcavaricata Kunz, 1974
- Emertonia gracilis Wilson C.B., 1932
- Emertonia hessleri Mathiske, Thistle & Veit-Köhler, 2021
- Emertonia holsatica (Klie, 1929)
- Emertonia idiotes (Wells, 1967)
- Emertonia ilse Mathiske & Veit-Köhler, 2021
- Emertonia ingridae Pointer & Veit-Köhler, 2013 In: Pointer, Kihara, Glatzel & Veit-Köhler, 2013
- Emertonia insularis (Kunz, 1981)
- Emertonia koreana Back & W. Lee, 2017
- Emertonia longifurcata (Scheibel, 1975)
- Emertonia longisetosa (Krishnaswamy, 1951)
- Emertonia masryi (Bodin, 1979)
- Emertonia miguelensis (Kunz, 1983)
- Emertonia minor (Vasconcelos, Veit-Kohler, Drewes & Parreira dos Santos, 2009)
- Emertonia panamensis (Mielke, 1984)
- Emertonia paraholsatica (Mielke, 1975)
- Emertonia perharidiensis (Wells, 1963)
- Emertonia psammobionta (Noodt, 1964)
- Emertonia psammophila (Noodt, 1964)
- Emertonia pygmaea (Nicholls, 1939)
- Emertonia regulexstans (Mielke, 1984)
- Emertonia serrata Mathiske & Veit-Köhler, 2021
- Emertonia similis (Mielke, 1984)
- Emertonia simplex Back & W. Lee, 2017
- Emertonia unguiseta (Mielke, 1984)
