= Leptopontiidae =

Scientific classification
- Domain: Eukaryota
- Kingdom: Animalia
- Phylum: Arthropoda
- Class: Copepoda
- Order: Harpacticoida
- Family: Leptopontiidae

Family of crustaceans

Leptopontiidae is a family of crustaceans belonging to the order Harpacticoida.

Genera:

- Bereraia Huys, 2009
- Ichnusella Cottarelli, 1971
- Leptopontia Scott, 1902
- Notopontia Bodiou, 1977
- Parasewellina Cottarelli, Saporito & Puccetti, 1986
- Prosewellina Mielke, 1987
- Psammopsyllus Nicholls, 1945
- Sewellina Krishnaswamy, 1956
- Syrticola Willems & Claeys, 1982
