= Parastenocarididae =

Scientific classification
- Kingdom: Animalia
- Phylum: Arthropoda
- Clade: Pancrustacea
- Class: Copepoda
- Order: Harpacticoida
- Family: Parastenocarididae; Chappuis, 1933

Family of crustaceans

Parastenocarididae is a family of copepods in the order Harpacticoida adapted to life in groundwater. It contains the following genera:

- Asiacaris Cottarelli, Bruno & Berera, 2010
- Brasilibathynellocaris Jakobi, 1972
- Brinckicaris Jakobi, 1972
- Clujensicaris Jakobi, 1972
- Dussartstenocaris Karanovic & Cooper, 2011
- Eirinicaris Corgosinho, 2017
- Enckellicaris Jakobi, 1972
- Entzicaris Jakobi, 1972
- Fontinalicaris Jakobi, 1972
- Forficatocaris Jakobi, 1969
- Italicocaris Jakobi, 1972
- Kinnecaris Jakobi, 1972
- Lacustricaris Jakobi, 1972
- Macacocaris Jakobi, 1972
- Michelicaris Jakobi, 1972
- Monodicaris Schminke, 2009
- Murunducaris Reid, 1994
- Nanacaris Jakobi, 1972
- Nipponicaris Jakobi, 1972
- Oshimaensicaris Jakobi, 1972
- Pannonicaris Jakobi, 1972
- Parastenocaris Kessler, 1913
- Phreaticaris Jakobi, 1972
- Potamocaris Dussart, 1979
- Proserpinicaris Jakobi, 1972
- Remaneicaris Jakobi, 1972
- Simplicaris Galassi & De Laurentiis, 2004
- Siolicaris Jakobi, 1972
- Stammericaris Jakobi, 1972
