= Peltidiidae =

Scientific classification
- Kingdom: Animalia
- Phylum: Arthropoda
- Clade: Pancrustacea
- Class: Copepoda
- Order: Harpacticoida
- Family: Peltidiidae

Family of crustaceans

Peltidiidae is a family of copepods belonging to the order Harpacticoida.

== Genera ==
Genera:

- Alteutha Baird, 1846
- Alteuthella Scott, 1909
- Alteuthellopsis Lang, 1948
