= Paramesochridae =

Scientific classification
- Domain: Eukaryota
- Kingdom: Animalia
- Phylum: Arthropoda
- Class: Copepoda
- Order: Harpacticoida
- Family: Paramesochridae; Lang, 1944

Subfamilies and Genera
- See text

Synonyms
- Remaneidae Nicholls, 1945

Family of crustaceans

Paramesochridae is a family of copepods belonging to the order Harpacticoida.

== Genera ==
Diarthrodellinae Huys, 1987

- Rossopsyllus Soyer, 1975
- Tisbisoma Bozic, 1964

Paramesochrinae Lang, 1944

- Biuncus Huys, 1996
- Caligopsyllus Kunz, 1975
- Kunzia Wells, 1967
- Maliithipon Cottarelli & Bruno, 2021
- ParamesScott T., 1892

Incertae sedis

- Apodopsyllus Kunz, 1962
- Diarthrodella Klie, 1949
- Emertonia Wilson C.B., 1932
- Leptopsyllus Scott T., 1894
- Meiopsyllus Cottarelli & Forniz, 1995
- Paraleptopsyllus Lang, 1944
- Remanea Klie, 1929
- Scottopsyllus Apostolov & Marinov, 1988
- Wellsopsyllus Kunz, 1981
