= Turbonilla emertoni =

Scientific classification
- Kingdom: Animalia
- Phylum: Mollusca
- Class: Gastropoda
- Family: Pyramidellidae
- Genus: Turbonilla
- Species: T. emertoni

Binomial name
- Turbonilla emertoni A. E. Verrill, 1882

Species of gastropod

Turbonilla emertoni is a species of sea snail, a marine gastropod mollusk in the family Pyramidellidae, the pyrams and their allies.

== Description ==
The shell grows to a length of 4.8 mm.

== Distribution ==
This species occurs in the Atlantic Ocean off New England at a depth of 435 m.
