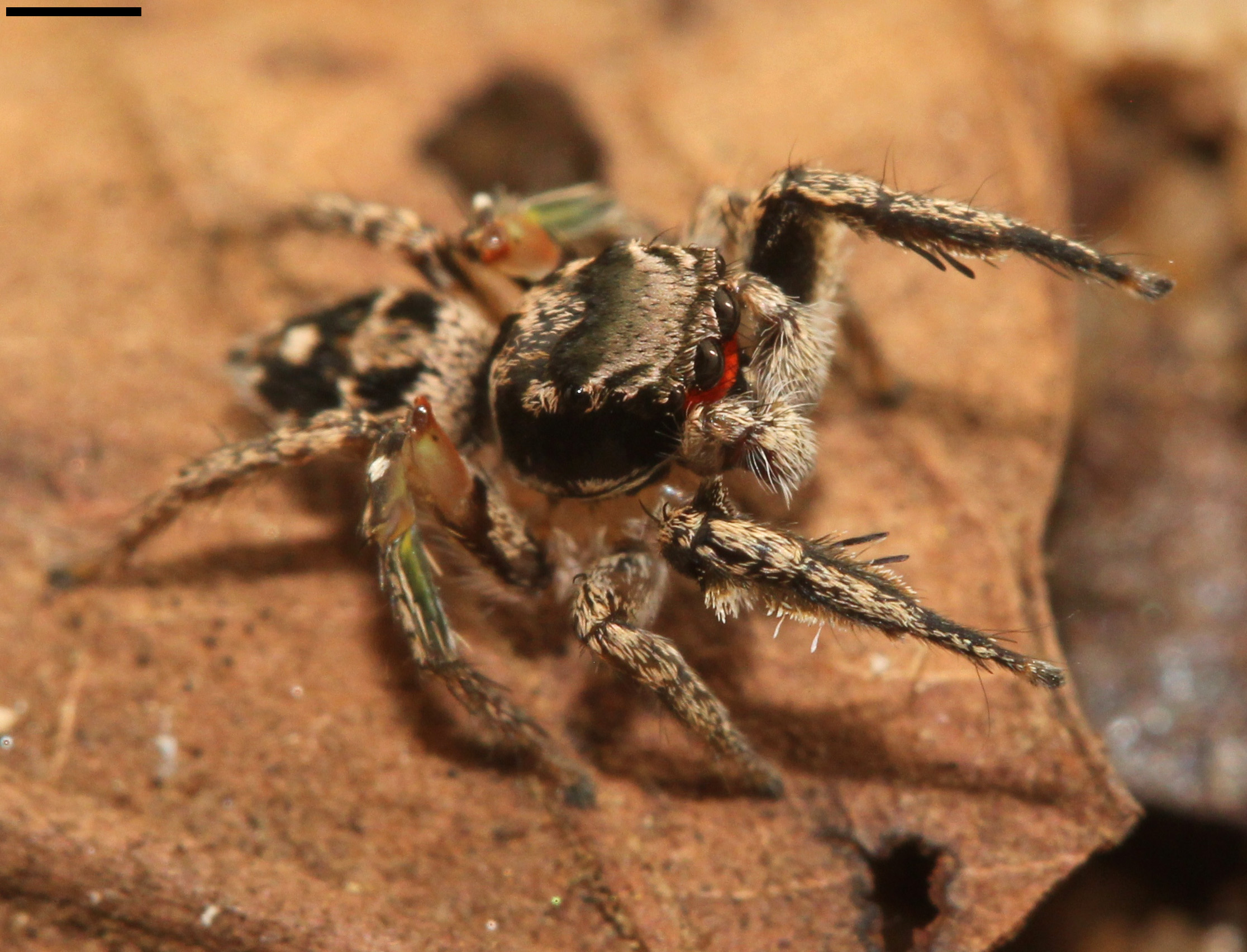
- Male
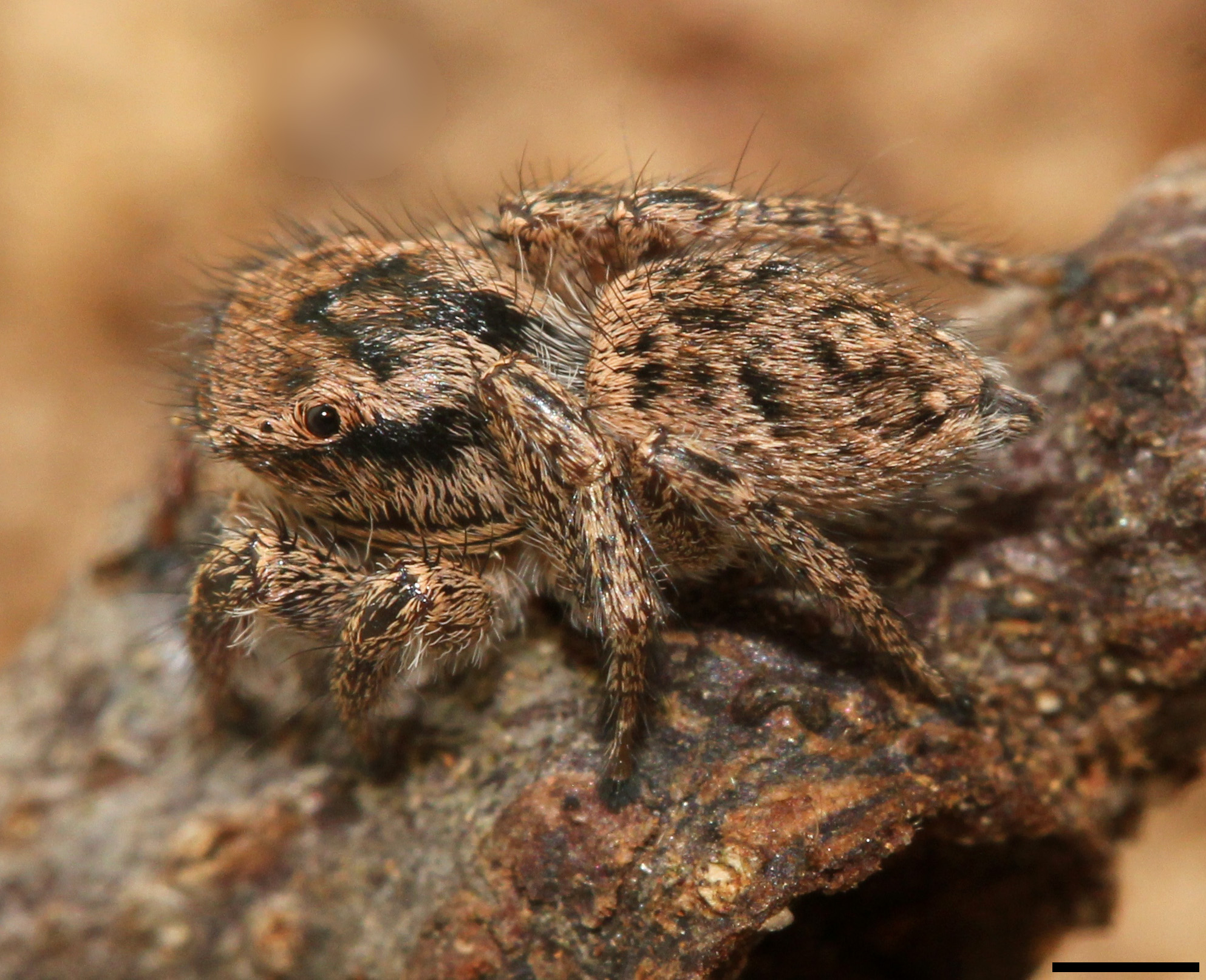
- Female

Scientific classification
- Kingdom: Animalia
- Phylum: Arthropoda
- Subphylum: Chelicerata
- Class: Arachnida
- Order: Araneae
- Infraorder: Araneomorphae
- Family: Salticidae
- Genus: Habronattus
- Species: H. coecatus

Binomial name
- Habronattus coecatus (Hentz, 1846)

= Habronattus coecatus =

Species of spider

Habronattus coecatus is a species of jumping spider that can be found in Mexico, the United States, and Bermuda.

== Description ==
The spider is mostly black, with bands of tan scales. The male clypeus is covered with red scales.
