= Laophontidae =

Scientific classification
- Domain: Eukaryota
- Kingdom: Animalia
- Phylum: Arthropoda
- Class: Copepoda
- Order: Harpacticoida
- Family: Laophontidae

Family of crustaceans

Laophontidae is a family of copepods belonging to the order Harpacticoida.

== Genera ==
The family contains the following genera:

- Aequinoctiella Cottarelli, Bruno & Berera, 2008
- Afrolaophonte Chappuis, 1960
- Amerolaophontina Fiers, 1991
- Apistophonte Gheerardyn & Fiers, (in Gheerardyn, Fiers, Vincx & De Troch, 2006)
- Applanola Huys & Lee, 2000
- Archesola Huys & Lee, 2000
- Archilaophonte Willen, 1995
- Arenolaophonte Lang, 1965
- Asellopsis Brady & Robertson, 1873
- Bathyesola Huys & Lee, 2000
- Bathylaophonte Lee W. & Huys, 1999
- Carcinocaris Cottarelli, Bruno & Berera, 2006
- Carraroenia McCormack, 2006
- Chilaophonte Huys, 2009
- Corbulaseta Huys & Lee, 2000
- Cornylaophonte Willen, 1996
- Coullia Hamond, 1973
- Echinolaophonte Nicholls, 1941
- Elapholaophonte Schizas & Shirley, 1994
- Esola Edwards C., 1891
- Fiersiphontina Bruno & Cottarelli, 2011
- Folioquinpes Fiers & Rutledge, 1990
- Galapalaophonte Mielke, 1981
- Harrietella Scott T., 1906
- Hemilaophonte Jakubisiak, 1933
- Heterolaophonte Lang, 1948
- Heteronychocamptus Lee W. & Huys, 1999
- Hoplolaophonte Hamond, 1973
- Indolaophonte Cottarelli, Saporito & Puccetti, 1986
- Inermiphonte Huys & Lee, 2009
- Jejulaophonte Back & Lee, 2014
- Klieonychocamptoides Noodt, 1958
- Klieonychocamptus Noodt, 1958
- Laophonte Philippi, 1840
- Laophontina Norman & Scott T., 1905
- Lipomelum Fiers, 1986
- Lobitella Monard, 1934
- Maiquilaophonte Mielke, 1985
- Marbefia Huys & Lee, 2009
- Mexicolaophonte Cottarelli, 1977
- Microchelonia Brady, 1918
- Microlaophonte Vervoort, 1964
- Mictyricola Nicholls, 1957
- Mielkiella George, 1997
- Mourephonte Jakobi, 1953
- Novolaophonte Cottarelli, Saporito & Puccetti, 1983
- Onychocamptus Daday, 1903
- Onychoquinpes Gómez & Morales-Serna, 2013
- Paralaophonte Lang, 1948
- Paronychocamptus Lang, 1948
- Peltidiphonte Gheerardyn & Fiers, 2006
- Philippiphonte Huys & J. Lee, 2018
- Pilifera Noodt, 1952
- Platychelipus Brady, 1880
- Platylaophonte Bodin, 1968
- Pontophonte Lee W. & Huys, 1999
- Propephonte Gheerardyn & Fiers, 2006
- Psammolaophonte Wells, 1967
- Psammoplatypus Lee W. & Huys, 1999
- Pseudolaophonte Scott A., 1896
- Pseudonychocamptus Lang, 1944
- Quinquelaophonte Wells, Hicks & Coull, 1982
- Raibautius Huys, 2016
- Raowellsia Özdikmen, 2008
- Raptolaophonte Cottarelli & Forniz, 1989
- Robustunguis Fiers, 1992
- Spiniferaponte Gheerardyn & Fiers, 2007
- Stygolaophonte Lang, 1965
- Tapholeon Wells, 1967
- Troglophonte Huys & Lee W., 2000
- Vostoklaophonte Yeom, Nikitin, Ivanenko & Lee, 2018
- Weddellaophonte Willen, 1996
- Wellsiphontina Fiers, 1991
- Xanthilaophonte Fiers, 1991
