= Darcythompsoniidae =

Scientific classification
- Kingdom: Animalia
- Phylum: Arthropoda
- Clade: Pancrustacea
- Class: Copepoda
- Order: Harpacticoida
- Family: Darcythompsoniidae; Lang, 1936

Genera
- Darcythompsonia T. Scott, 1906; Kristensenia Por, 1983; Leptocaris T. Scott, 1899; Pabellonia Gómez, 2000

Family of crustaceans

Darcythompsoniidae is a family of copepods, containing four genera. Members of the family have a very wide distribution throughout the tropics, where they live in rotting mangrove leaves. They lack egg sacs and are thought to lay their eggs directly into the leaf litter.

Darcythompsonia and Kristensenia are both large-bodied, while Leptocaris species are much smaller.
