= James Henry Emerton =

American arachnologist and illustrator

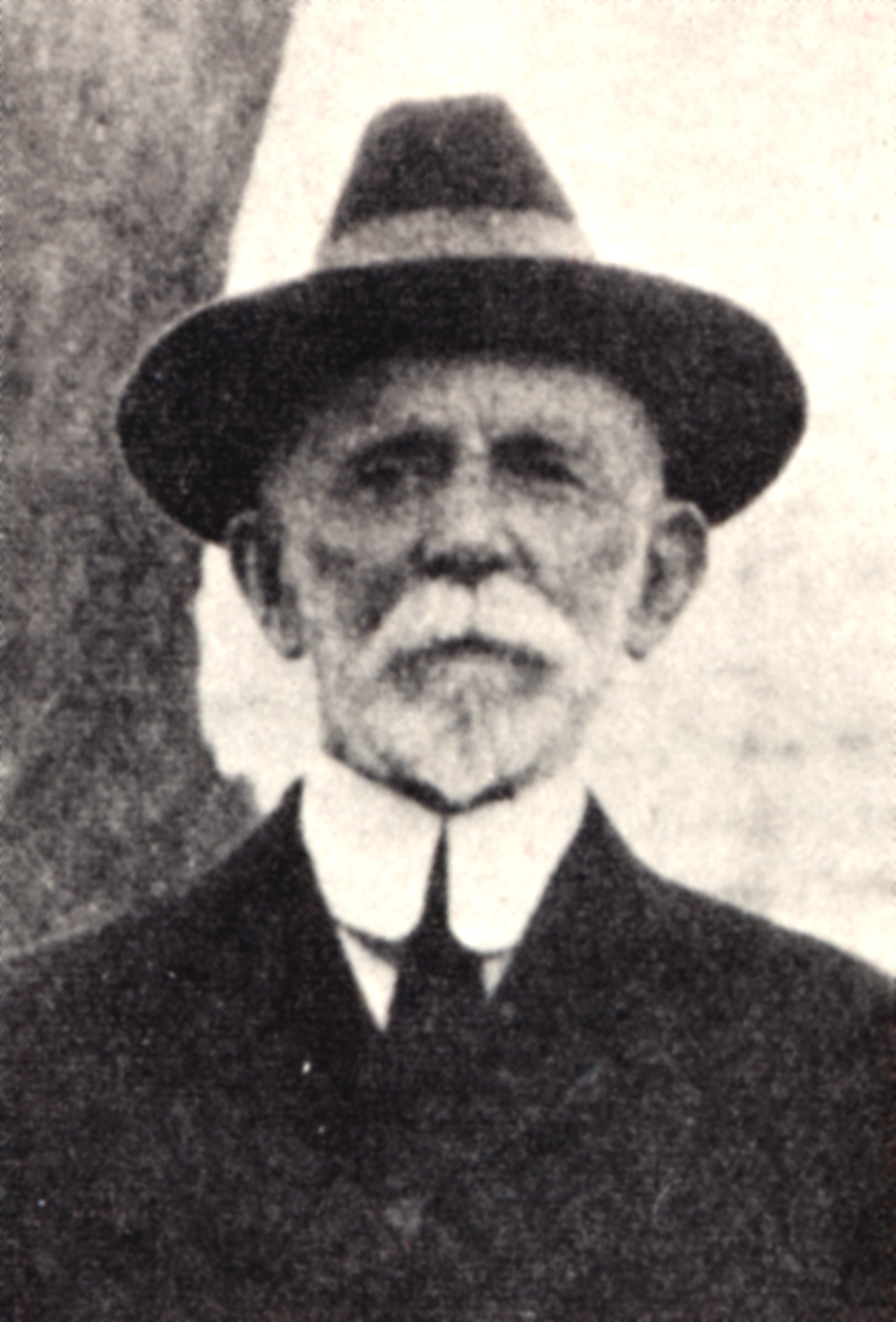
- Born: March 31, 1847; Salem, Massachusetts, U.S.
- Died: December 2, 1931 (aged 84)
- Scientific career
- Fields: Arachnology

James Henry Emerton (March 31, 1847 – December 5, 1931) was an American arachnologist and illustrator.

== Early life ==
Emerton was born at Salem, Massachusetts, on March 31, 1847. He was rather frail, and a young helper in his father's drug store, George F. Markoe, interested the boy in outdoor life. They collected plants, insects and shore invertebrates and at the age of fifteen he was frequently visiting the Essex Institute, where he became acquainted with A. S. Packard, F. W. Putnam, John Robinson, Caleb Cooke, and others who later became more or less prominent students of natural history.

From the first, he showed much skill in drawing and made sketches of a great variety of natural objects. Of these early drawings, there are many in Packard's Guide and forty quarto plates in Watson and Eaton Botany of the Fortieth Parallel published in 1871.

== Professional life ==
He was elected to the Boston Society of Natural History in 1870, and in 1873-1874 was an assistant in the Museum. While there, he prepared the notes to Hentz's Spiders of the United States and the article on cave spiders of Indiana and Kentucky (1875).

He had already decided to study spiders, had collected in over 100 localities in the New England states, and had amassed a collection of more than 300 species. Early in 1875 he left the Boston Society to spend more than a year in Europe. While there he was enrolled as a student for a short time at the University of Leipzig (October 1875 to April 1876) and later (May to July 1876) at the University of Jena, but apparently he spent much time collecting spiders and becoming acquainted with the arachnologists of Europe, particularly O. P. Cambridge, Simon, Koch, Thorell and Ohlert. He had taken to Europe his collection of New England spiders and from Leipzig in December 1875, wrote an article comparing them with those of the European fauna.

Returning, he again engaged in drawing and prepared many of the colored plates in Eaton's Ferns of North America and also many in Packard's Monograph of the Geometridae.

In 1877, he gave eight lectures on zoology and six on spiders at the Summer School of Biology in Salem, and in 1878 delivered another series of six lectures on spiders. He became a curator in the Museum of the Peabody Academy of Science where he spent an hour each day with the visitors and prepared a Guide to the Museum. In 1879 he also gave instruction in the zoological laboratory at Salem.

He spent some time at Albany, N. Y., making drawings for Prof. A. Hall, and later (about 1880) went to New Haven, where he was appointed assistant to Professor A. E. Verrill. He made a host of drawings for Verrill, and prepared the famous models of the great squid and octopus now in the Museum of Comparative Zoology at Cambridge and in the National Museum of Natural History at Washington. For these models he was awarded a medal with an elaborately engraved certificate at the International Fisheries Congress in London in 1882.

At New Haven in 1884 he married Mary A. Hills, and shortly thereafter moved to Boston, which was henceforth his home. His wife died in 1898.

He did much modeling for medical colleges and made drawings for many persons; as Minot's Textbook of Embryology, Verrill's Marine Invertebrates, Scudder's Butterflies of New England, Peckham's papers on spiders, and many for the U. S. Fish Commission.

He was active in various natural history organizations and became an important factor in furthering interest in local science. He began to travel more widely, visiting the West Indies in 1893 with Alexander Agassiz, going with Morse in 1902 to the Southern States, in 1905 to the Californian Mountains, in 1914 to the Canadian Rockies, in 1920 to the Hudson Bay Region. On these and numerous shorter trips he industriously collected spiders.

He became much interested in a Federation of New England Natural History Societies, and this he considered as the most useful way of stimulating interest in Natural History. He was the Secretary and principal support of this society until his death.

He always seemed to be in good health, and collected spiders only a few months before his death, December 5, 1931.

Aside from being a naturalist he was an artist for the sake of art. He painted hundreds of water colors, often depicting the sea, the shore, or ships. For several seasons this was done at Ipswich, and in later years he went regularly in July to Gloucester for painting. He frequently exhibited before art societies, and lived for many years in an artist's studio apartment.

His principal interest and work was on the taxonomy and distribution of the spiders of New England and Canada. His method of sifting leaves, moss and detritus brought to light great numbers of the smaller forms. At first he sent these to O. P. Cambridge in England, who described them; later he began his famous series of New England Spiders, publishing the Theridiidae in 1882. The plates in these papers were especially valuable; those in the second part (Epeiridae) containing some of his finest drawings. It is these illustrations that give the characteristic appearance of the parts which have given to Emerton much of his importance as an arachnologist. Cambridge, in reviewing Hentz's Spiders of the United States (Nature, 1876) refers to Emerton's two plates as follows:-"In point of accurate detail and artistic finish these figures are immeasurably in advance of those engraved from Hentz's drawings."

The series on New England spiders was followed by four supplements, two papers on Canadian spiders and numerous smaller articles, describing in all over 350 species, always with useful illustrations. No other writer has so thoroughly figured his species, old as well as new. In several papers he traced the distribution of certain northern spiders. Several of his early articles dealt with the habits of spiders and, even to the last, he loved to watch each autumn for the flying spiders. He gave to the Museum of Comparative Zoology the first set of the types of his descriptions.

== Taxa names after Emerton ==
Among the taxa named after J. H. Emerton are:

- Emertonia Wilson, 1932 (copepod)
- Autolytus emertoni Verrill, 1881 (polychaete)

and the gastropods

- Gymnobela emertoni Verrill & Smith, 1884
- Pleurotomella emertonii Verrill & Smith, 1884
- Turbonilla emertoni Verrill, 1882
- Polycerella emertoni Verrill, 1881

and lots of spiders, of course... In fact, at this writing, 19 March 2025, there are 32 valid spider species named after him (plus an additional 10 species declared to be junior synonyms). A daily listing can be found at The World Spider Catalog.
