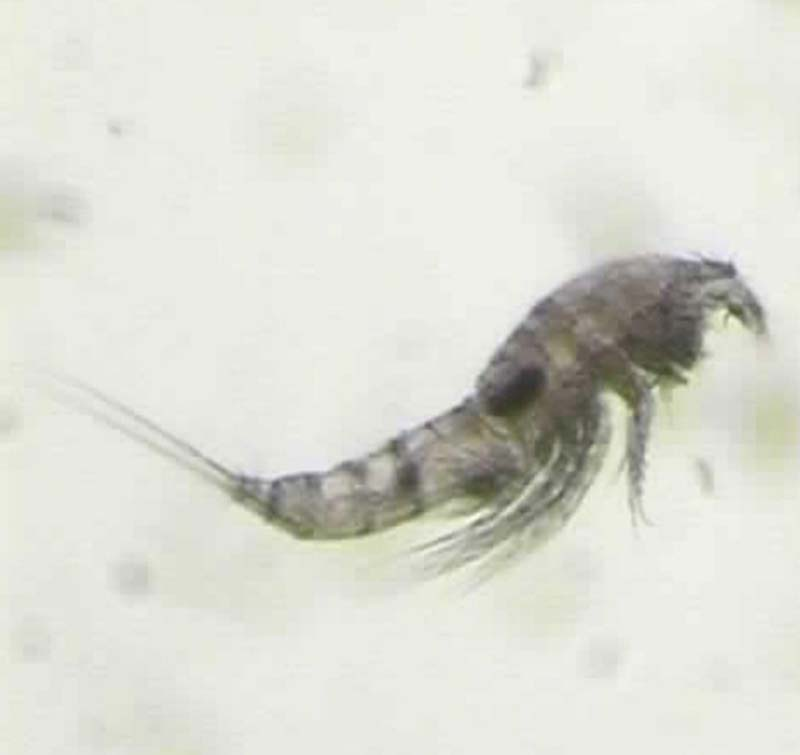
- Harpacticoid copepod

Scientific classification
- Kingdom: Animalia
- Phylum: Arthropoda
- Clade: Pancrustacea
- Class: Copepoda
- Infraclass: Neocopepoda
- Superorder: Podoplea
- Order: Harpacticoida; G. O. Sars, 1903

Families
- See text

= Harpacticoida =

Order of crustaceans

Harpacticoida is an order of copepods, in the subphylum Crustacea. This order comprises 463 genera and about 3,000 species; its members are benthic copepods found throughout the world in the marine environment (most families) and in fresh water (essentially the Ameiridae, Parastenocarididae and the Canthocamptidae). A few of them are planktonic or live in association with other organisms. Harpacticoida represents the second-largest meiofaunal group in marine sediments, after nematodes. In Arctic and Antarctic seas, Harpacticoida are common inhabitants of sea ice. The name Harpacticoida comes from the Greek noun harpacticon (rapacious predator) and the suffix -oid (akin to) and means reminiscent of a predator.

Harpacticoids are distinguished from other copepods by the presence of only a very short pair of first antennae. The second pair of antennae are biramous, and the major joint within the body is located between the fourth and fifth body segments. They typically have a wide abdomen, and often have a somewhat worm-like body.

== Families ==
53 families are currently recognised in the Harpacticoida:

- Adenopleurellidae
- Aegisthidae
- Ameiridae
- Ancorabolidae
- Arenopontiidae
- Argestidae
- Balaenophilidae
- Canthocamptidae
- Chappuisiidae
- Cletodidae
- Cletopsyllidae
- Cristacoxidae
- Cylindropsyllidae
- Dactylopusiidae
- Darcythompsoniidae
- Ectinosomatidae
- Hamondiidae
- Harpacticidae
- Idyanthidae
- Laophontidae
- Laophontopsidae
- Latiremidae
- Leptastacidae
- Leptopontiidae
- Louriniidae
- Metidae
- Miraciidae
- Nannopodidae
- Neobradyidae
- Normanellidae
- Novocriniidae
- Orthopsyllidae
- Parameiropsidae
- Paramesochridae
- Parastenheliidae
- Parastenocarididae
- Peltidiidae
- Phyllognathopodidae
- Pontostratiotidae
- Porcellidiidae
- Protolatiremidae
- Pseudotachidiidae
- Rhizothricidae
- Rometidae
- Rotundiclipeidae
- Superornatiremidae
- Tachidiidae
- Tegastidae
- Tetragonicipitidae
- Thalestridae
- Thompsonulidae
- Tisbidae
- Zosimeidae
