= Atlantis (disambiguation) =

Atlantis is a fictional island mentioned in Plato's works Timaeus and Critias.

Atlantis may also refer to:

== Arts and entertainment ==
=== Books ===
- Atlantis (anthology), an anthology of themed fantasy and science fiction short stories
- Atlantis (novel), a 2005 novel by David Gibbins
- Atlantis, a 1912 German novel by Gerhart Hauptmann
- Atlantis (series), an alternate history trilogy by Harry Turtledove
- Atlantis in comics, multiple locations in comic books
  - Atlantis (Aquaman), a location in DC Comics
  - Atlantis (Marvel Comics), a location in Marvel Comics

=== Film ===
- Atlantis (franchise), a Disney media franchise including two films
  - Atlantis: The Lost Empire, a 2001 animated Disney film
  - Atlantis: Milo's Return, a 2003 animated Disney direct-to-video film
- Atlantis (1913 film), a Danish feature silent film
- Atlantis (1930 film), a French-language film directed by E. A. Dupont and Jean Kemm
- Atlantis (1991 film), a French documentary film by Luc Besson
- Atlantis (2019 film), a Ukrainian feature film by Valentyn Vasyanovych
- Atlantis, the Lost Continent, a 1961 American feature film by George Pal

=== Games ===
- Atlantis (role-playing game), a fantasy role-playing game
- Atlantis (video game), a 1982 video game by Imagic
- Atlantis PbeM, a fantasy multi-player strategy "Play By e-Mail" game
- Atlantis: The Lost Tales, a 1997 PC adventure game
- Atlantis (franchise), a Disney media franchise which spawned several video games
- Atlantis Software, a British computer game publisher

=== Music ===
==== Opera ====
- Der Kaiser von Atlantis, a one-act opera by Viktor Ullmann with a libretto by Peter Kien, symbolically about Hitler

Venues

- The Atlantis (music venue), in Washington, DC

==== Bands ====
- Atlantis (German band), German blues/funkadelic/krautrock rock band of the 1970s

==== Albums ====
- Atlantis (Andrea Berg album), 2013
- Atlantis (Besieged album), 2007
- Atlantis: A Symphonic Journey (David Arkenstone album), 2004
- Atlantis (Earth and Fire album), 1973
- Atlantis (F.I.R. album), 2011
- Atlantis (Lunatica album), 2001
- Atlantis (Wayne Shorter album), 1985
- Atlantis, a repackage of Shinee's album Don't Call Me, 2021
- Atlantis (Sun Ra album), 1969
- Atlantis (TNT album), 2008
- Atlantis (McCoy Tyner album), 1975
- Atlantis: Hymns for Disco, a 2006 k-os album
- Atlantis, a 2004 album by Atrocity

==== Songs ====
- "Atlantis" (instrumental), a 1963 instrumental by the Shadows
- "Atlantis" (Donovan song), 1968
- "Atlantis", a 2015 song by Seafret
- "Atlantis" (Bridgit Mendler song), 2016
- "Atlantis", a 1955 song by Les Baxter
- "Atlantis", a 2012 song by Ellie Goulding from Halcyon
- "Atlantis", a 2012 song by Azealia Banks from Fantasea
- "Atlantis", a 2021 song by Noah Gundersen, featuring Phoebe Bridgers, from A Pillar of Salt
- "Atlantis", a song by Imperio
- "Atlantis", a 2021 song by Shinee

=== Television ===
- Atlantis (TV series), a 2013 British fantasy-adventure
- Atlantis (2011 film) (Atlantis: End of a World, Birth of a Legend), a 2011 BBC docudrama
- Atlantis, series episode, see list of Hercules: The Legendary Journeys episodes
- Atlantis (Stargate), the setting for the science fiction TV series Stargate Atlantis
- "Atlantis", an episode of season 2 of Phineas and Ferb
- "Atlantis", this was in the old animated Godzilla (1978 TV series) cartoon series (1st season, 7th episode). It was a HUGE UFO that was freed from a malfunctioning security droid by Godzilla. It then took off from the ocean after the droid was terminated by Godzilla.

== Places ==
- Atlantis (commune), a commune established in 1974 in Ireland that was moved to Colombia
- Atlantis, Florida, a city in Palm Beach
- Atlantis, Western Cape, a town in South Africa
- Atlantis basin, a region on the planet Mars
- Atlantis Massif, an undersea massif in the Atlantic Ocean
- Atlantis Marine Park, a former amusement park in Western Australia

== Resorts ==
- Atlantis (Wisconsin Dells), a resort hotel in Wisconsin
- Atlantis Casino Resort Spa, a resort in Reno, Nevada
- Atlantis Paradise Island, a resort in Nassau, Bahamas
- Atlantis The Palm, United Arab Emirates, a resort
- Atlantis Sanya, a resort

== Air ==
- Atlantis Airlines (United States), a defunct airline
- Atlantis (Germany), a defunct airline
- Atlantis Airlines, a defunct airline of Senegal
- Air Atlantis, a charter airline based in Portugal (1985–1993)

== Sea vessels ==
- Atlantis Submarines, a public passenger touring submarine fleet
- Atlantis (barquentine), Dutch three-masted sailing passenger ship
- German auxiliary cruiser Atlantis, a 1937 German commerce raider of World War II
- HMS Atlantis (P432), a British submarine
- RV Atlantis (AGOR-25) (built 1994), a 1996 research vessel at Woods Hole
- RV Atlantis, a 1930 research vessel at Woods Hole Oceanographic Institution
- RV Atlantis II, a research vessel operated by Woods Hole until 1996
- USS Atlantis (SP-40), US Navy patrol boat (1917–1919)

== Other uses ==
- 1198 Atlantis, an asteroid
- Space Shuttle Atlantis, a retired NASA spacecraft
- Atlantis Hotel (disambiguation)
- Atlantis (market), a darknet market
- Atlantis (newspaper), an American Greek-language daily newspaper
- Atlantis (wrestler) (born 1962), Mexican masked professional wrestler
- Atlantis FC, a Finnish football club
- Atlantis Communications, a defunct Canadian television and film production company
- Atlantis Condominium, a condominium in Miami, Florida
- Atlantis Oil Field, an oil field in the Gulf of Mexico
- Atlantis PQ, a 2006 oil platform in the Gulf of Mexico

== See also ==
- Atlantide
- Atlantis of the Sands, a legendary lost place in the Arabian Peninsula
- L'Atlantide
- New Atlantis (disambiguation)
- Atlantis-2, a transatlantic telephone cable
- Six Flags Atlantis, a defunct amusement park in south Florida
- Atlantida (disambiguation)
