= List of ships named Atlantis =

The following ships were named Atlantis for the city of Atlantis:

- Atlantis (barquentine)
- German auxiliary cruiser Atlantis, a German auxiliary cruiser that operated during World War II
- HMS Atlantis, a cancelled submarine of the Royal Navy
- RV Atlantis (1930), a sail training and research vessel renamed PNA Dr. Bernardo A. Houssay of the Argentine Prefecture
- RV Atlantis (AGOR-25), a United States Navy research vessel
- RV Atlantis II, a research vessel
- USS Atlantis, a patrol vessel of the United States Navy during World War I

== See also ==
- Atlantis (disambiguation)
- Space shuttle Atlantis
