= Atlántida =

Atlántida is a poetic name for the mythical continent of Atlantis.

Atlantida may also refer to:

- Atlantida (brachiopod), a genus of brachiopods
- Atlantida (cave), a karst cave in Ukraine
- Atlántida, Uruguay, a town in the department of Canelones, Uruguay
- Atlántida Department, an administrative country division in Honduras
- Atlántida Sport Club, a football club in Paraguay
- Atlantidae, a family of gastropod molluscs

== Literature and art ==
- Atlântida Cinematográfica, Brazilian film studio
- Editorial Atlántida, an Argentine publishing house
- Atlántida (magazine), a magazine published between 1918 and 1970 by Editorial Atlántida
- L'Atlàntida, an 1877 Catalan epic poem by Jacint Verdaguer
- Atlantida (novel), a 1919 novel by Pierre Benoit
- Atlántida (opera), a 1962 orchestral cantata by Manuel de Falla, based on Verdaguer's poem
- Atlantida (Portuguese magazine), a Portuguese magazine, 1915 to 1920
- Atlantida Project, Russian electronic rock group (2007–2015)
- Atlantida (TV series), Russian television series featuring Nelli Uvarova
- Atlantida (Zhirov), series of two monographs by Russian chemist Nikolai Zhirov on the existence of Atlantis

== See also ==
- Atlantis (disambiguation)
