= Save My Soul =

Save My Soul may refer to:

- Save My Soul (album) or the title song, by Big Bad Voodoo Daddy, 2003
- Save My Soul, an album by Padi, 2003
- "Save My Soul" (Decadance song), 1994
- "Save My Soul" (Kristine W song), 2004
- "Save My Soul", a song by Groove Armada from Soundboy Rock, 2007
- "Save My Soul", a song by JoJo from III, 2015
- "Save My Soul", a song by Bastille, 2025

== See also ==
- "Saved My Soul", a song by Audio Adrenaline from Sound of the Saints, 2015
- "Who's Gonna Save My Soul", a song by Gnarls Barkley, 2008
