= Val Worthington =

British-American oceanographer

- Born: Lawrence Valentine Worthington; March 6, 1920; Chelsea, London, England
- Died: February 10, 1995 (aged 74); Abacos, Bahamas
- Citizenship: United States of America, United Kingdom
- Education: Princeton University (1938–1941)
- Spouse: Ruth Worthington (née McGuinness)
- Children: 1 daughter Jill Worthington, 1 son Lawrence Worthington
- Scientific career
- Fields: physical oceanography
- Workplaces: Woods Hole Oceanographic Institution (WHOI)

Lawrence Valentine Worthington (March 6, 1920 – February 10, 1995), better known as Val Worthington was a British-American physical oceanographer. His most noted contributions are the discovery of mode water which he called 18° water, first published in a research journal in May 1959, and confirming the existence of as well as producing the first recording of the sound of the sperm whale

== Early life ==
Worthington was born on March 6, 1920, in Chelsea, London, England. He attended and graduated from Westminster School in 1938. He came to the United States that year and enrolled at Princeton University, which he attended from 1938 to 1941.

== Career ==
In 1941 Worthington’s career at the Woods Hole Oceanographic Institution began when he joined the staff as a bathythermograph technician. He took a military leave in 1943 to serve in the U.S. Navy and returned to WHOI in 1946 as a hydrographic technician working to describe Gulf Stream meanders and ring formation. In 1950 he was appointed a physical oceanographer and in 1951 was named a research associate. Worthington was appointed a senior scientist in the Physical Oceanography Department in 1963, and served as department chairman from 1974 to 1981. He retired in 1982 and was named a scientist emeritus that year.

== Research ==
Worthington conducted his research out at sea on various vessels such as RV Atlantis II, DSV Alvin and RRS Discovery II. Worthington’s research interests included Atlantic circulation, deep water circulation, the Caribbean Sea, the Kuroshio Current and water mass formation. His research attributions include disproval of the existence of the American Scout seamount, measurements of deep currents in the western North Atlantic, oceanographic measurements of the Caribbean Sea, measurements of vertical water movement in the Cayman Basin, confirming the existence of deep currents in the Labrador Sea, confirming the existence of large cyclonic rings from the northeast Sargasso Sea, a census of Gulf Stream rings, and a census on the water masses of the world ocean.

== Later life and legacy ==
After Worthington’s retirement in 1982 colleagues at WHOI wrote a tribute to him entitled “Kanpū Soka: Cold Wind Two Gyres” a rough english translation for a nickname given to Worthington by colleagues Hideo Kawai and Susumu Honjo based on his controversial North Atlantic gyre theory. The 860 page collection’s publication was paid for by the National Science Foundation, the Office of Naval Research, and by the Woods Hole Oceanographic Institution.

Soon after his retirement a species of copepod was named in honor of Worthington. Paracandacia worthingtoni, found at that time only in the South Pacific, was described by biologist George Grice in the Bulletin of the Plankton Society of Japan in 1981. The classification was changed to follow the accepted genus and therefore became Candacia worthingtoni

Worthington died on February 10, 1995, in the Abaco, Bahamas at the age of 74.
