= American Scout Seamount =

Phantom Atlantic Ocean seamount

- Location within North Atlantic

Location
- Location: North Atlantic Ocean
- Coordinates: 46°30′N 37°30′W

Geology
- Type: phantom

American Scout Seamount appeared on charts of the North Atlantic Ocean published during the 1950s. It was located near 46°30′N 37°30′W with a depth of 37 meters. Investigations by the Woods Hole Oceanographic Institution research vessel Atlantis II in 1964 by Richard Backus and Valentine Worthington found no evidence that it existed. Extensive surveys by the U.S. Naval Oceanographic Office eventually disproved the existence of a seamount in the vicinity. A June 1966 bathymetric and magnetic survey by the new survey ship Silas Bent found no evidence of a seamount with no soundings less than 2,362 fathoms (14,172 ft; 4,320 m) but did find strong returns from the Deep Scattering Layer that could be mistaken for shoals.
