= Artemis (barque) =

Sailing ship built in 1926

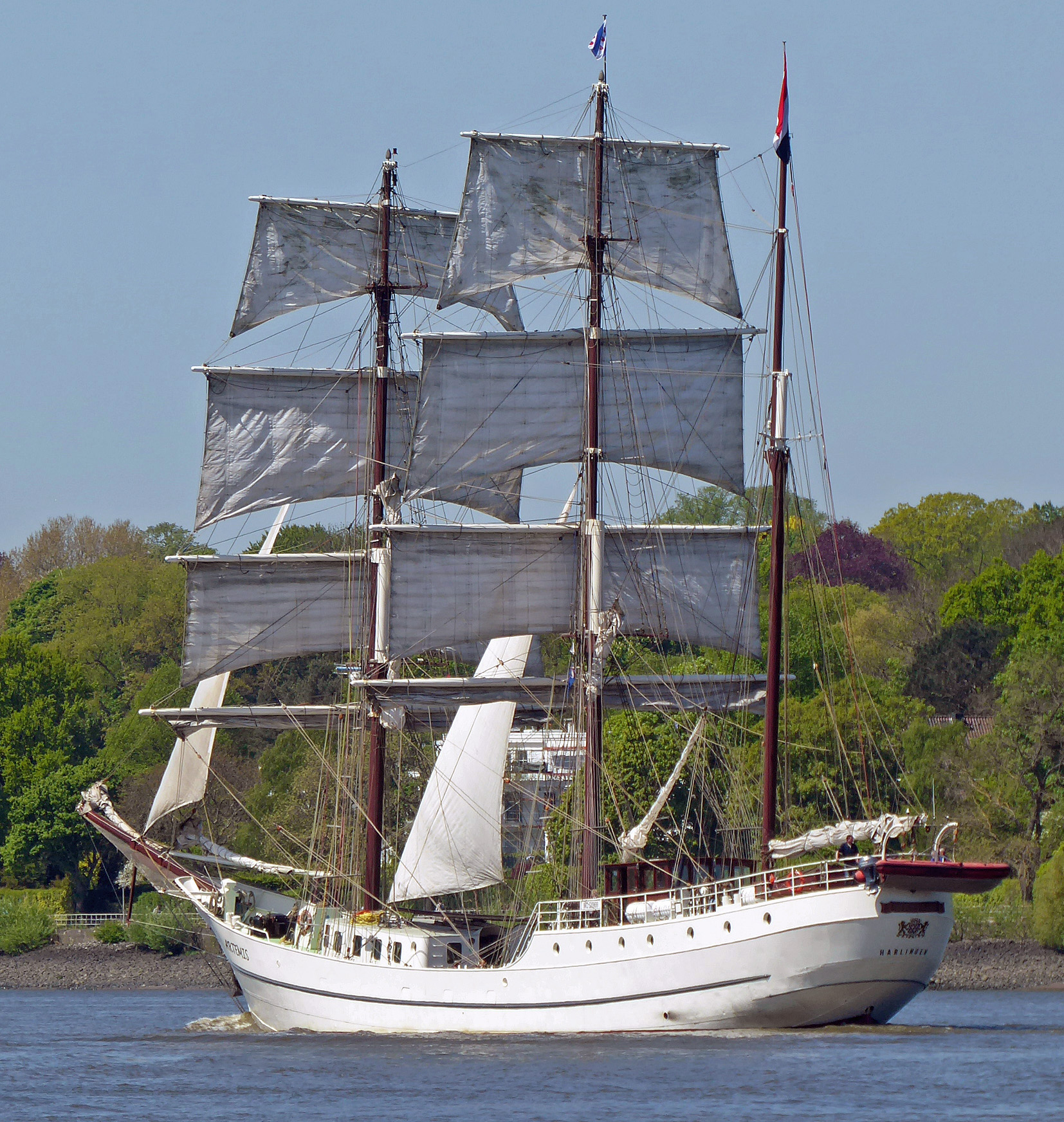
- Artemis at Hamburg, Germany

History

Norway
- Name: Pol II, Jeløy, HMS Levanter Whale catcher ship, Minesweeper (1926–1948)
- Owner: Hvalfangerselskabet Polaris A/S, Larvik, Norway
- Operator: Melsom & Melsom (1926–1935), N.T. Nielsen-Alonso (Late 1930s), Royal Navy (1941–1946)
- Port of registry: Oslo
- Ordered: 1925
- Builder: Nylands Verksted, Oslo, Norway
- Launched: 1926
- Completed: 1926
- Home port: Larvik, Horten
- Notes: Converted into a cargo ship in 1948, steam boiler and engine replaced by diesel engine.

History

Sweden
- Name: Lister, Cargo ship (1948–1966)
- Owner: A/B Rivø (Gustav Bartley), Gothenburg (1948), resold to Sölvesborgs Skeppsmäkleri & Speditionskontor, Djupekås, Sweden, Rederi A/B Lister.
- Port of registry: Gothenburg
- Builder: A/S Fredrikshavns Jernstøberi & Maskinfabrik, Fredrikshavn, Denmark
- Home port: Mjällby
- Notes: Rebuilt and lengthened in 1951

History

Denmark
- Name: Artemis, Cargo ship (1966–2000)
- Owner: I/S Artemis (H. Hermansen), Marstal, Denmark
- Operator: H.C. Grube I/S (1987–2000)
- Port of registry: Marstal
- Builder: Aabenraa Motorfabrik, Aabenraa, Denmark
- Renamed: Artemis
- Home port: Marstal
- Notes: New engine from 1961 installed in 1971. Converted into a barque in 2000.

Netherlands
- Name: Artemis
- Operator: Frisian Sailing (2000–2006), Tallship Artemis BV (2006–)
- Port of registry: Easterlittens
- Reclassified: 2000
- Reinstated: 2000
- Home port: Easterlittens
- Identification: IMO number: 5209699; MMSI number: 244875000; Callsign: PFCB
- Status: Active As of 2024
- Notes: Converted to a 3-masted barque in 2000, new engine 2001.

General characteristics
- Type: Barque
- Tonnage: 321 GT
- Length: 59.0 m (193 ft 7 in) (overall)
- Beam: 7 m (23 ft 0 in)
- Height: 31 m (101 ft 8 in) (main mast)
- Draught: 3.5 m (11 ft 6 in)
- Propulsion: Caterpillar diesel engine type 3408, 4CY/SA, 8-cylinder, cyl. dim.: 137 x 152 mm.; 500 hp (370 kW)
- Sail plan: Sail area: 1,050 m^{2} (11,300 sq ft)
- Speed: 12 knots (22 km/h; 14 mph)
- Capacity: 120 persons day trips, overnight 32, 16 cabins
- Crew: 6

Artemis is a three-masted barque active as a sailing charter ship sailing mostly in the Baltic Sea and northern Europe.

== History as a whale catcher, minesweeper and cargo ship ==
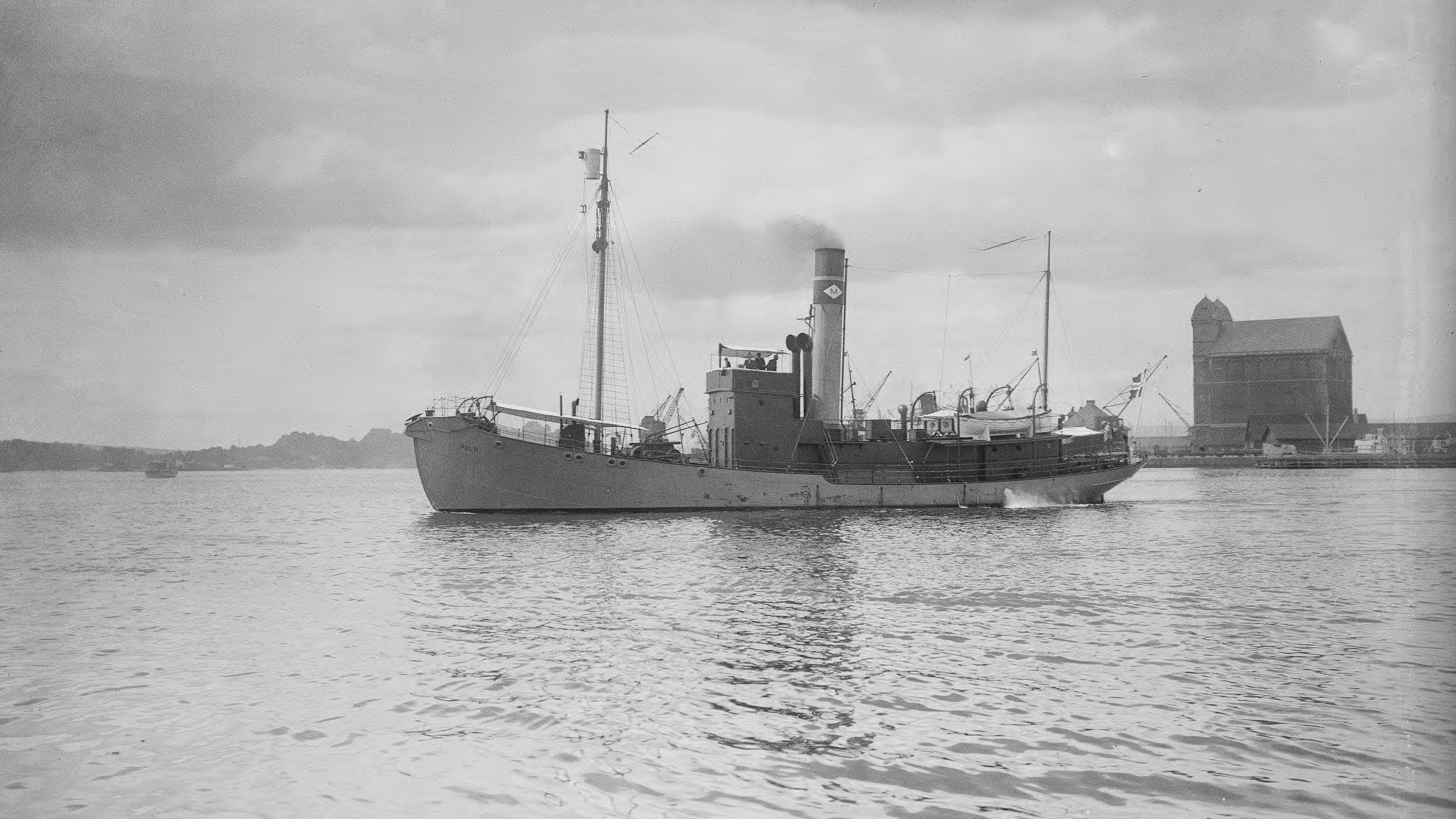
The vessel as a Whaler

The ship was built in 1926 by the Norwegian shipyard Nylands Verksted in Oslo and was named as Pol II. It was delivered as a whale catcher ship owned by Hvalfangerselskabet Polaris A/S operated by Melsom & Melsom. Originally the Pol II was 57 metres (187 ft 0 in) long. The whaler measured at 240 gross register tons (GRT), had a steam engine with an output of 135 horsepower (101 kW).

The ship was used as a whaler in the northern and southern polar seas until 1940, then went info military service as a minesweeper for the Royal Navy during World War II and was listed as a ship in Nortraship's register. A few years after the war in 1948 the ship was sold to Sweden and rebuilt to a cargo ship and lengthened two meters.

In 1966 the ship was sold to I/S Artemis (H Hermansen) in Denmark and was renamed to Artemis.

== Conversion to a classic sailing ship ==
Around 2000 when ship was sold to Frisian Sailing who converted it into a three-masted barque charter passenger ship. In 2006 the current owner took over the ship. The ship is now operated by Tallship Company in Franeker, Netherlands, which also operate the ships Atlantis and Antigua.

The ship's 100th-year anniversary is planned to take place in the harbour of Larvik in Norway on July 24–26 in 2026.

The sister ship Stedemaeght was built the same year as Artemis originally named Pol IV and was also converted to a sailship in 1991 offering charter from Lelystad, the Netherlands.

== Gallery ==
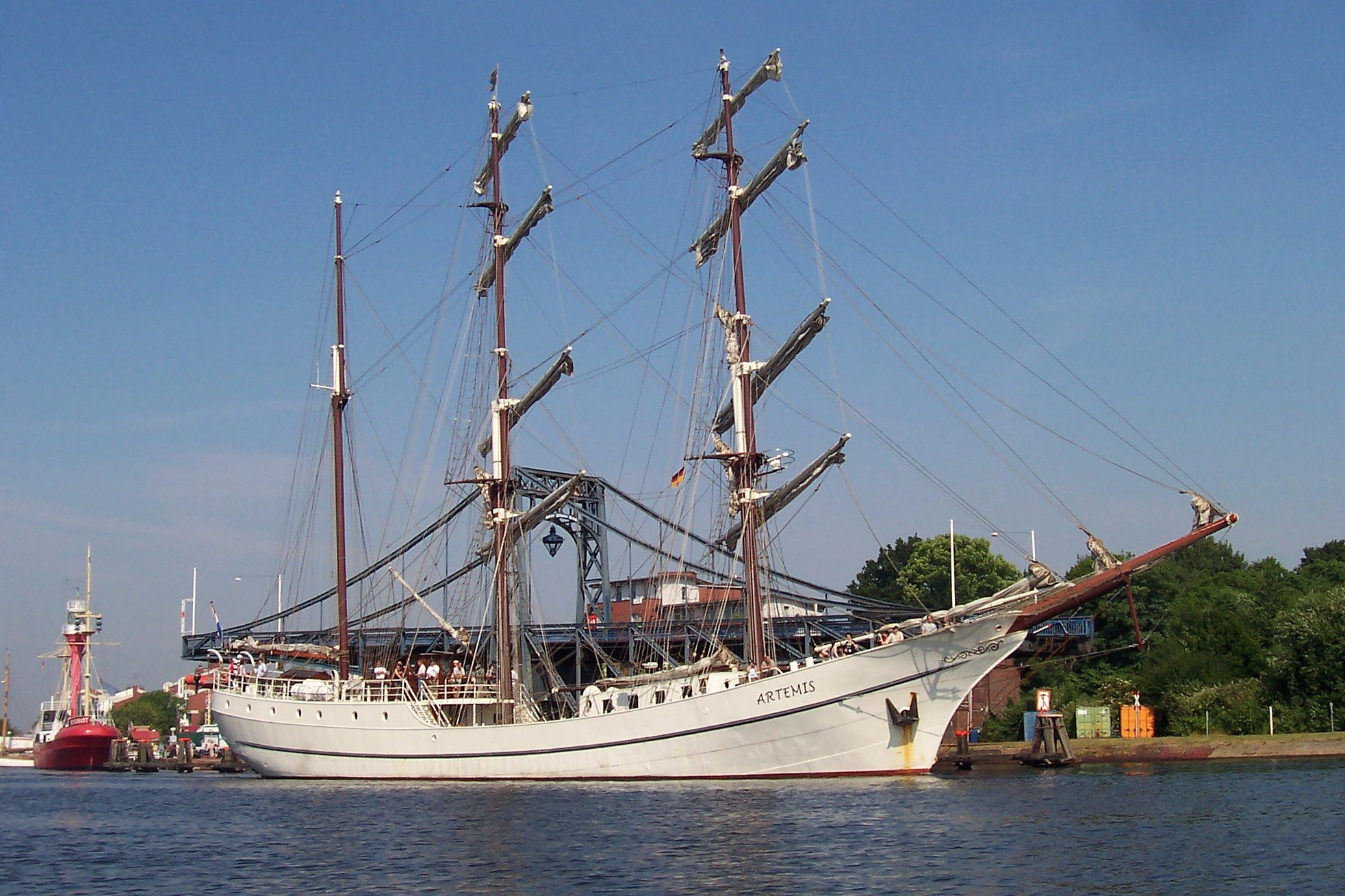

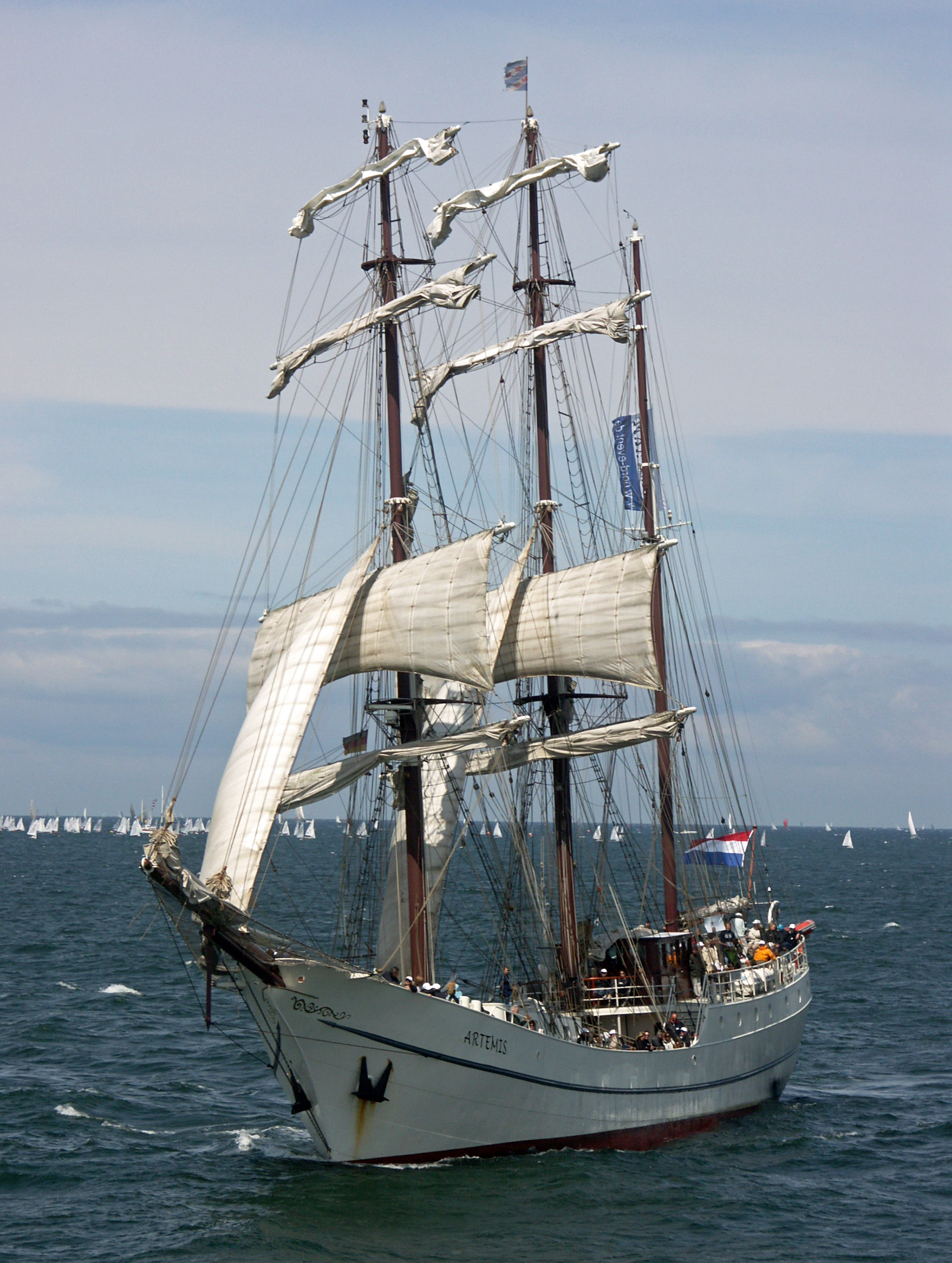

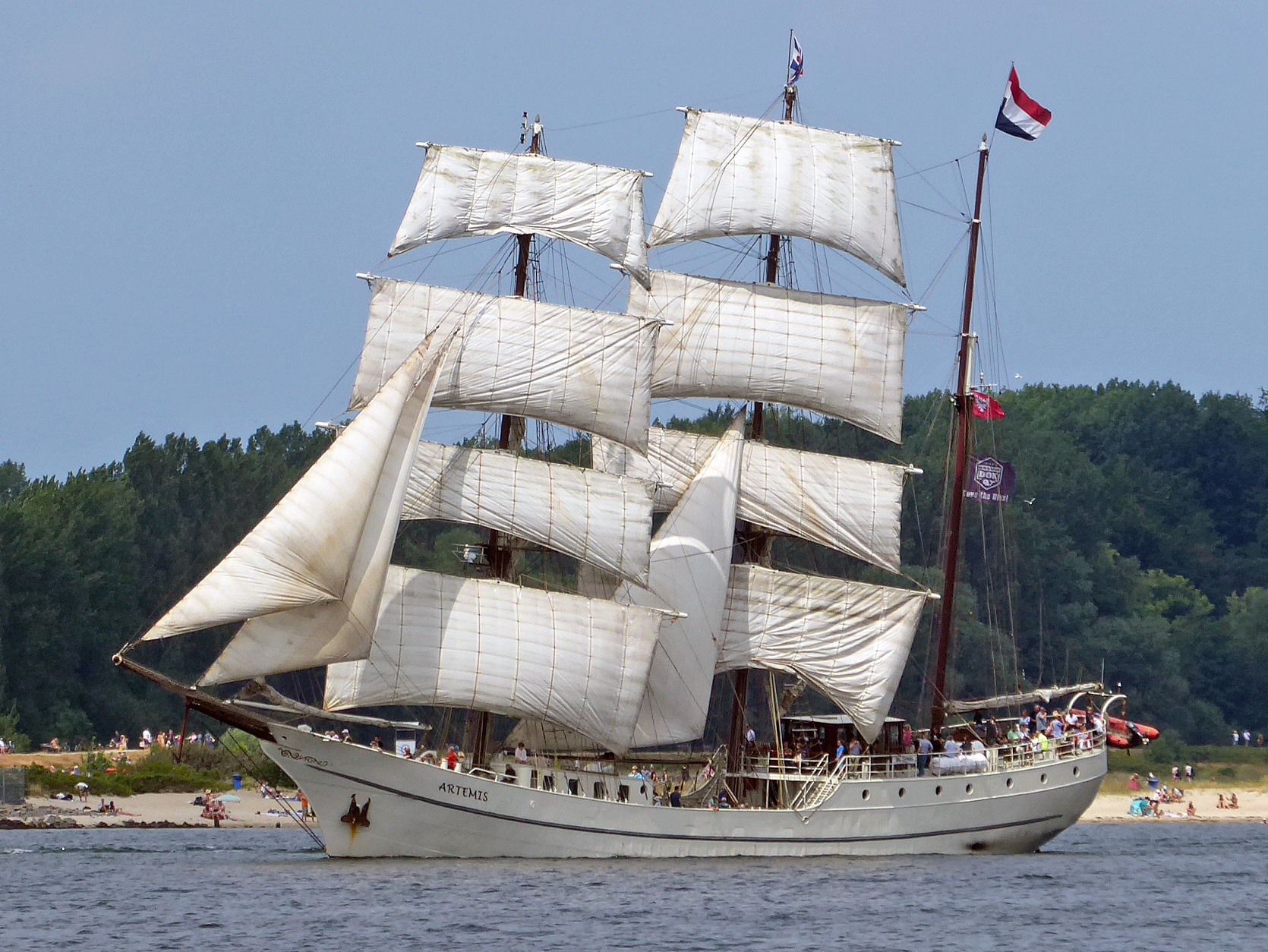

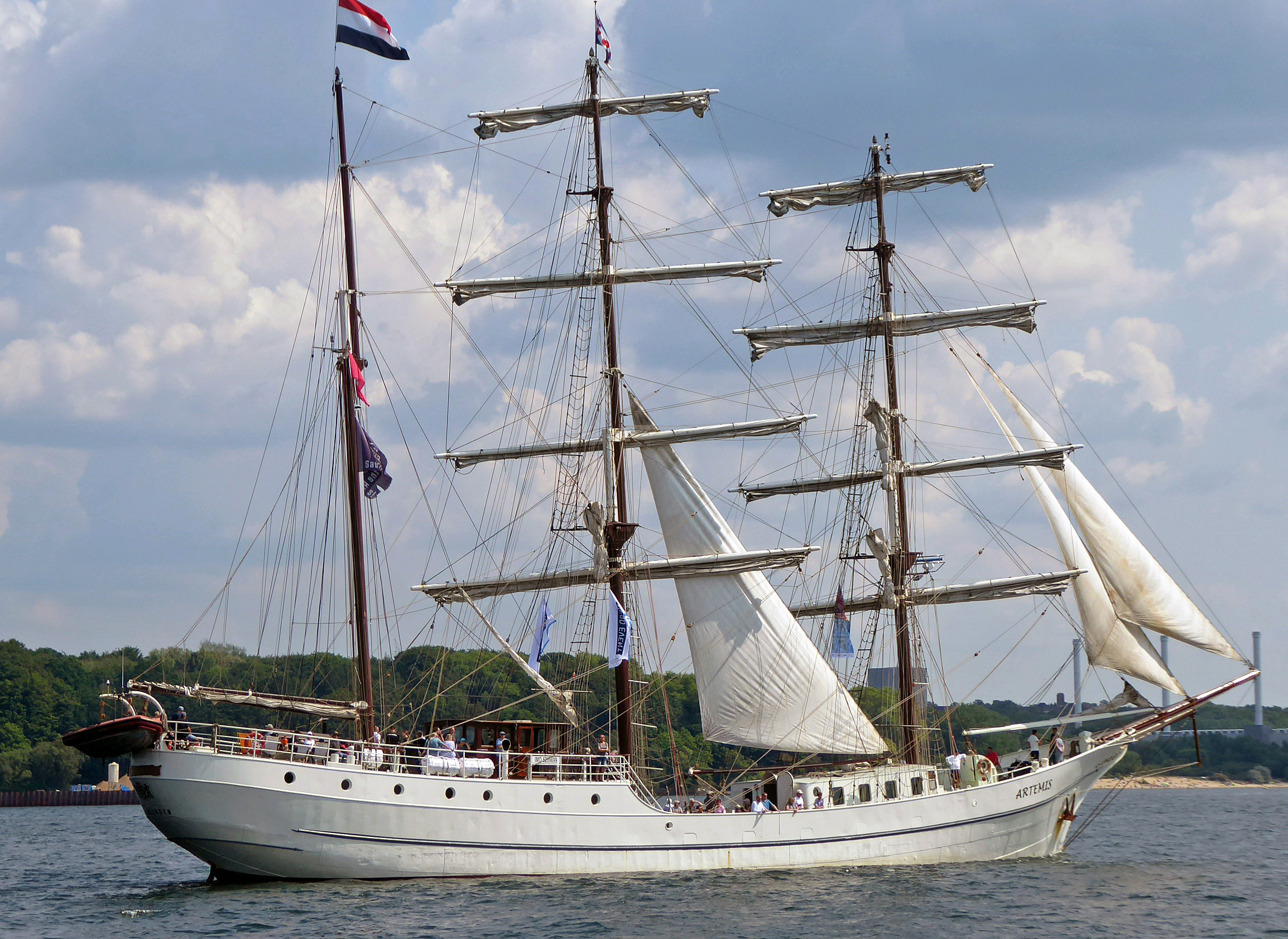
