= Atlantis Hotel =

Atlantis Resort or Hotel may refer to:

- Atlantis (Wisconsin Dells), in Wisconsin Dells, Wisconsin
- Atlantis Casino Resort Spa, in Reno, Nevada
- Atlantis Paradise Island, on Paradise Island in Nassau, Bahamas
- Atlantis, The Palm, in Dubai, United Arab Emirates
- Atlantis The Royal, Dubai
- Atlantis Hotel Bejaia Airoport, in Wilaya of Bejaia, Algeria
- Atlantis Hotel Akbou, in Wilaya of Bejaia, Algeria
- Atlantis Hotel Air de France, in Wilaya of Algiers, Algeria

== See also ==
- Atlantis (disambiguation)
