= Mode water =

Type of water mass which is nearly vertically homogeneous

Mode water is defined as a particular type of water mass, which is nearly vertically homogeneous. Its vertical homogeneity is caused by the deep vertical convection in winter. The first term to describe this phenomenon is 18° water, which was used by Valentine Worthington to describe the isothermal layer in the northern Sargasso Sea cooling to a temperature of about 18 °C each winter. Then Masuzawa introduced the subtropical mode water concept to describe the thick layer of temperature 16–18 °C in the northwestern North Pacific subtropical gyre, on the southern side of the Kuroshio Extension. The terminology mode water was extended to the thick near-surface layer north of the Subantarctic Front by McCartney, who identified and mapped the properties of the Subantarctic mode water (SAMW). After that, McCartney and Talley then applied the term subpolar mode water (SPMW) to the thick near-surface mixed layers in the North Atlantic’s subpolar gyre.

Water mass bodies of the Southern Ocean

== Formation and erosion ==
Different mode waters have different formation and erosion mechanisms. The subtropical mode water (STMW) is formed mainly by subduction, the SPMW is formed mainly by other processes. SAMW is due to the combination of subduction and other processes. erosion mechanism of SPMW is a combination of turbulent mixing and air-sea flux. The erosion mechanism of STMW is likely air-sea flux. For SAMW erosion turbulent mixing may be the main factor.

== Geographical distribution ==
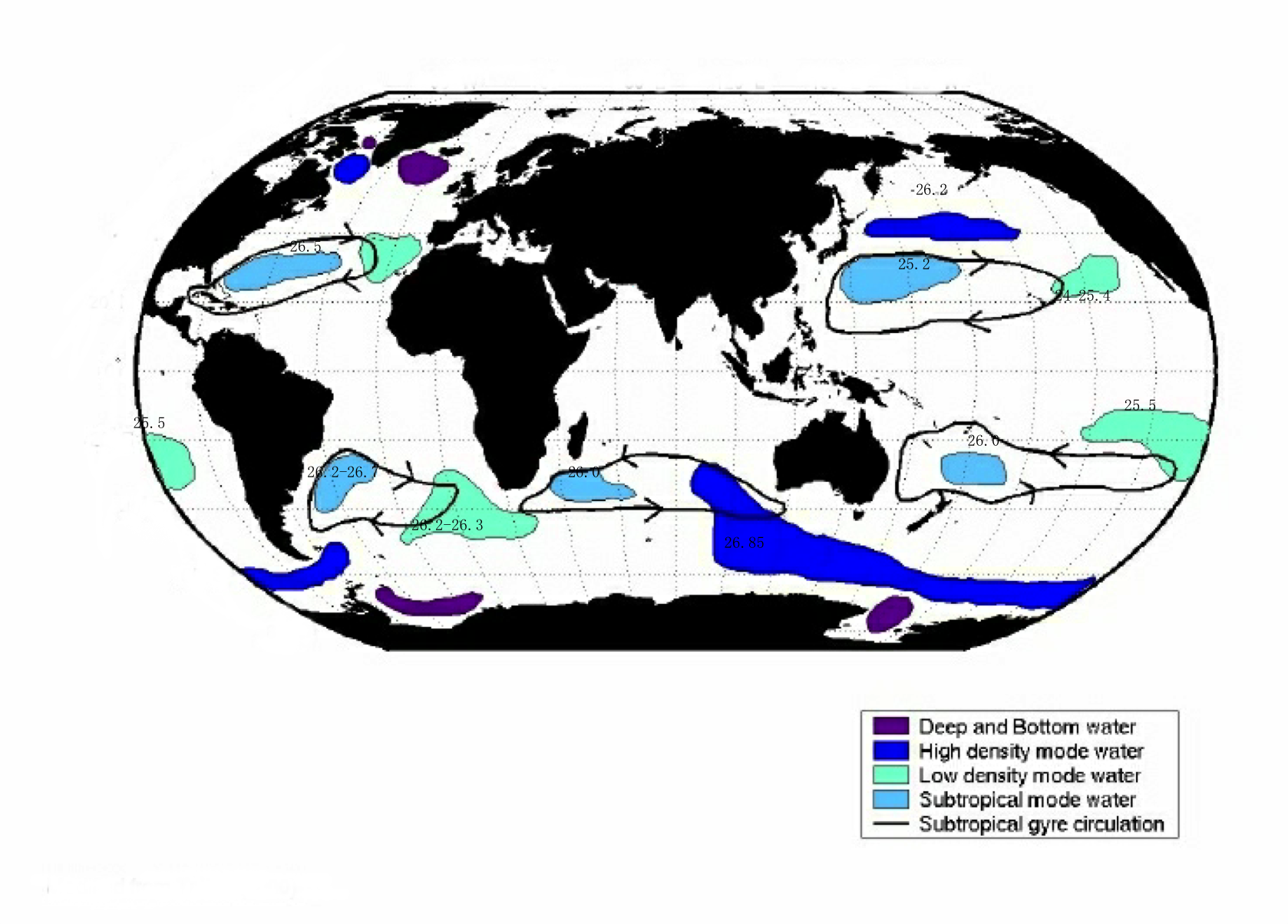
Mode water distribution according to Talley (2000)

Mode water formation areas are generally characterized by wintertime mixed layers that are relatively thick compared with other mixed layers in the same geographical region. North Atlantic, Southern eastern Indian Oceans and Ocean in the Pacific have the thickest mixed layers, so these thick layers are associated with the North Atlantic’s subpolar mode water and the Southern Ocean’s subantarctic mode water. Relatively thick mixed layers are also found in the subtropical mode water areas near the separated western boundary currents.

== Temporal variability ==
One prominent feature of mode waters is they are stable in properties and locations, so that researchers can use data set from all decades to map the approximate core properties. The stability of properties is linked to the largest spatial-scale, longest time-scale wind and buoyancy forcing. It is not to say there is no variation in properties of the mode water. These variations in these near-surface water masses, in temperature, salinity, density and thickness, are linked to surface forcing changes, although in some cases the connection is not yet obvious. For example, Suga and Hanawa show as the seasons progress, mode water moves away from the formation area and sometimes becomes permanently capped.

== Detection ==
To detect the mode water we can use the minimum value in the vertical gradient of potential density, or equivalently in the Brunt–Väisälä frequency. Since temperature profiles are more abundant and both salinity and temperature are relatively homogeneous in mode water, vertical temperature gradients are sometimes used instead of potential vorticity or the vertical gradient of potential density to identify the core of the mode water. There is no specific values of those gradients to define the boundaries of a given mode water.

== Importance ==
Mode waters have a big impact on nutrients distribution as they prevent deep-ocean nutrients from upwelling to the euphotic zone. Further more, they will control the biological pump, which plays an important role in carbon dioxide uptake. Dynamically, mode waters also control potential vorticity and baroclinity in the subtropical North Atlantic.
