= Alde Swarte Molen, Easterlittens =

Windmill in Friesland, Netherlands

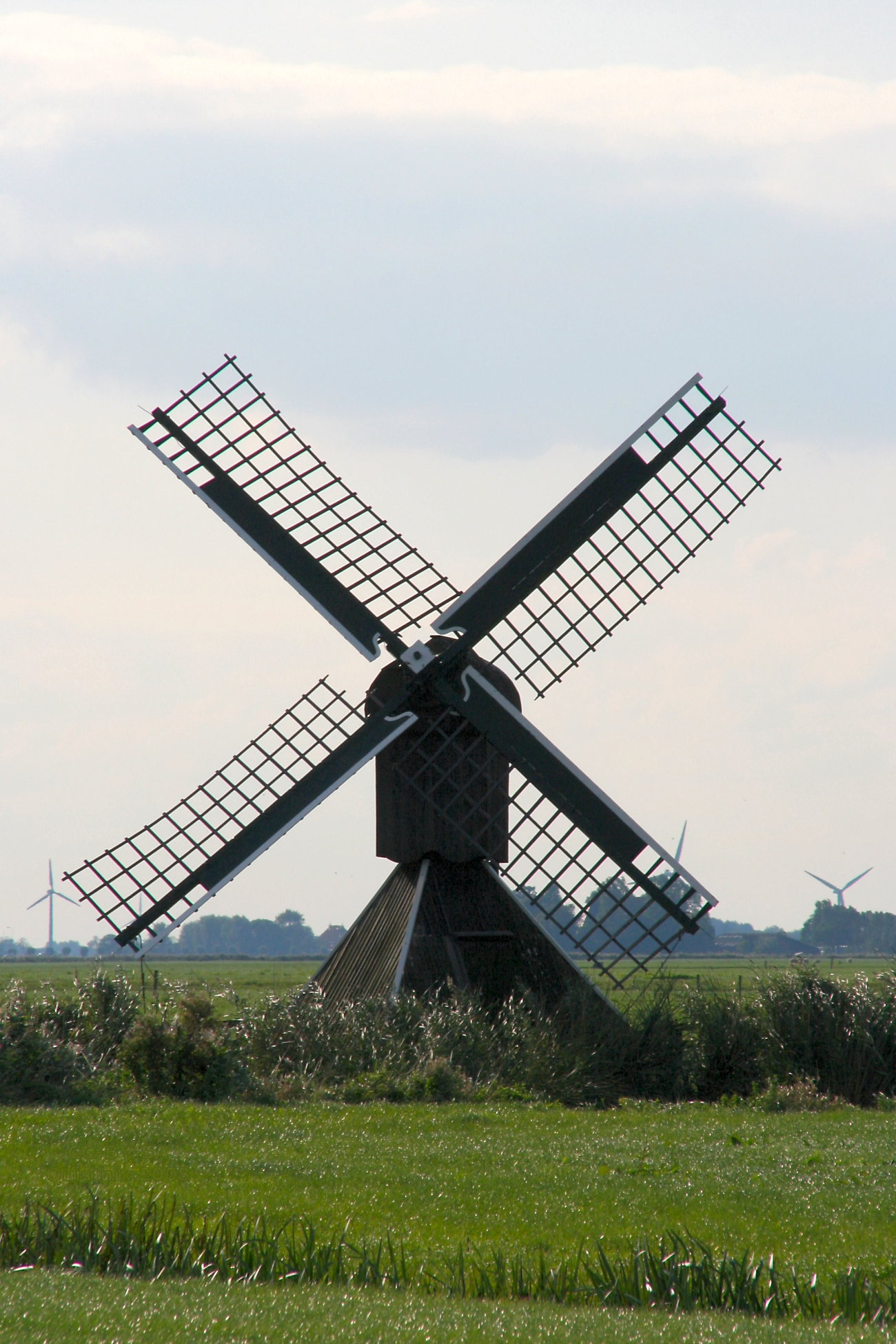
- Alde Swarte Molen, September 2009

Origin
- Mill name: Alde Swarte Molen
- Mill location: Nabij Skrinserdijk 3, 8835 XE Easterlittens
- Coordinates: 53°07′46″N 5°39′24″E
- Operator(s): Gemeente Littenseradiel
- Year built: 17th century

Information
- Purpose: Drainage mill
- Type: Hollow Post mill
- Roundhouse storeys: Single storey roundhous
- No. of sails: Four sails
- Type of sails: Common sails
- Windshaft: Wood
- Winding: Tailpole and winch
- Type of pump: Archimedes' screw

Alde Swarte Molen (English: Old Black Mill) is a Hollow Post mill in Easterlittens, Friesland, Netherlands which has been restored to working order. The mill is listed as a Rijksmonument, number 8531.

== History ==
Alde Swarte Molen probably dates from the 17th century. It was built to drain the Frankena Polder. Alde Swarte Molen worked until 1961 when the mill lost a sail in a storm. After this an electric motor took over the work of the mill. On 2 October 1967, the mill was sold to the Gemeente Baarderadeel for ƒ1. In 1969, the mill was restored by millwright De Roos of Leeuwarden. In 1981, a further restoration saw the replacement of the windshaft, sails and Archimedes' screw. In 1984, the mill passed to the Gemeente Littenseradiel in a reorganisation of local government in Friesland.

== Description ==
Alde Swarte Molen is what the Dutch describe as a "Spinnenkopmolen". It is a hollow post mill on a single storey roundhouse. The roundhouse is tiled with pantiles and the body is covered in vertical boards. The mill is winded by tailpole and winch. The sails are Common sails. They have a span of 10.40 metres (34 ft 1 in). The sails are carried on a wooden windshaft. The windshaft also carries the brake wheel which has 34 cogs. This drives the wallower (19 cogs) at the top of the upright shaft. At the bottom of the upright shaft, the crown wheel, which has 28 cogs drives a gearwheel with 27 cogs on the axle of the wooden Archimedes' screw. The axle of the screw is 250 millimetres (9¾ inches) diameter and the screw is 880 millimetres (2 ft 11 in) diameter and 4.12 metres (13 ft 6 in) long. The screw is inclined at 25½°. Each revolution of the screw lifts 150 litres (33 imp gal) of water.
