= Atlantide =

Atlantide may refer to:

- Shenandoah, Lasca II or Atlantide, three-masted schooner with a steel hull, built in New York City in 1902
- Atlantide (film), 2021 docufiction film written and directed by Yuri Ancarani
- "Atlantide" (song), 2026 song by Sarah Toscano

== See also ==
- Atlantis (disambiguation)
- L'Atlantide
