= New Atlantis (disambiguation) =

New Atlantis is a novel by Sir Francis Bacon.

New Atlantis may also refer to:

- The New Atlantis (journal), a journal founded in 2003
- New Atlantis (micronation), a micronation founded by Leicester Hemingway on a raft off Jamaica in the 1960s
- New Atlantis, a fictional country in Anatole France's Penguin Island
- "The New Atlantis", a short story by Ursula K. Le Guin
- "The New Atlantis", an occult-fascist political treatise by James H. Madole

== See also ==
- Atlantis (disambiguation)
- The New Atalantis, 1709 political satire by Delarivier Manley
