= Candacia worthingtoni =

Scientific classification
- Domain: Eukaryota
- Kingdom: Animalia
- Phylum: Arthropoda
- Class: Copepoda
- Order: Calanoida
- Family: Candaciidae
- Genus: Candacia
- Species: C. worthingtoni

Binomial name
- Candacia worthingtoni (Grice, 1981)

Synonyms
- Paracandacia worthingtoni Grice, 1981

Species of crustacean

Candacia worthingtoni is a species of copepod in the order Calanoida first described by George Grice in 1981 under the basionym Paracandacia worthingtoni. The species is named for the scientist emeritus Valentine Worthington, as a tribute to his contributions to the field of physical oceanography.
