= L'Atlantide =

L'Atlantide may refer to:

- L'Atlantide, also known as Atlantida, a 1919 novel by Pierre Benoit
- L'Atlantide (opera), an opera by Henri Tomasi first produced in 1959 at the Paris Opera
- L'Atlantide, the French name for the legendary island of Atlantis

== Film ==
- L'Atlantide (1921 film), a 1921 film directed by Jacques Feyder
- L'Atlantide (1932 film), a 1932 film directed by G. W. Pabst
- Siren of Atlantis, a 1949 film directed by Gregg G. Tallas, John Brahm, Arthur Ripley
- Journey Beneath the Desert (L'Atlantide), a 1961 film directed by Giuseppe Masini and Edgar G. Ulmer
- L'Atlantide (1992 film), a 1992 film directed by Bob Swaim

== See also ==
- Atlantide (disambiguation)
- Atlantis (disambiguation)
