= Save My Soul (Decadance song) =

Single by Decadance
- Released: September 19, 1994
- Genre: Eurodance
- Length: 3:56
- Label: EAMS
- Songwriter: Norbert Reichart
- Producer: Norbert Reichart

Decadance singles chronology
"Latin Lover" (1994)	"Save My Soul" (1994)	"Bailemos" (1995)

Music video
- "Save My Soul" on YouTube

"Save My Soul" is a 1994 song by Decadance, a Eurodance project by Austrian composer, music producer and entertainment entrepreneur Norbert Reichart. It peaked at number five on the singles chart in Austria and stayed within Ö3 Austria Top 40 for 12 weeks. On the Eurochart Hot 100, it reached number 76. A music video was also produced to promote the single.

== Track listing ==
12", Germany
No.	Title	Length
1.	"Save My Soul" (Extended Version)	5:56
2.	"Save My Soul" (Bolivian Trance Attack II)	4:20
3.	"Save My Soul" (Big Club Mix)	6:18
4.	"Save My Soul" (Airplay Mix)	3:56

CD maxi, Germany, Austria & Switzerland
No.	Title	Length
1.	"Save My Soul" (Airplay Mix)	3:56
2.	"Save My Soul" (Extended Version)	5:56
3.	"Save My Soul" (Big Club Mix)	6:18
4.	"Save My Soul" (Bolivian Trance Attack II)	4:20

== Charts ==
Chart (1994)	Peak position
Austria (Ö3 Austria Top 40)	5
Europe (Eurochart Hot 100)	76
