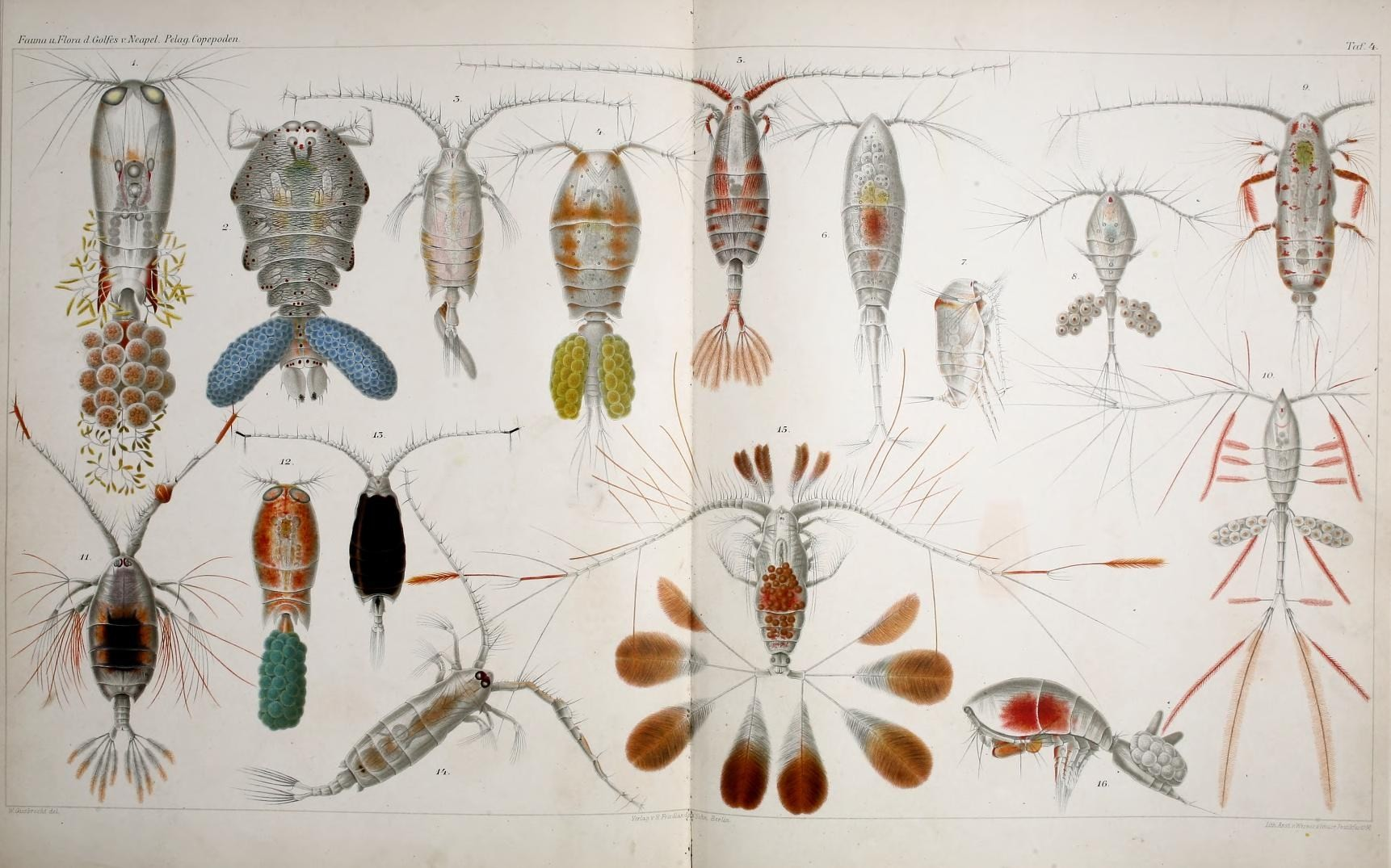

Scientific classification
- Kingdom: Animalia
- Phylum: Arthropoda
- Class: Copepoda
- Order: Calanoida
- Family: Candaciidae; Giesbrecht, 1893
- Genus: Candacia; Dana, 1846

Synonyms
- (Genus): Candace Dana, 1849; Ifionyx Krøyer, 1849; Ifionyx Krøyer, 1845; Paracandacia Grice, 1963

= Candacia =

Genus of crustaceans

Candacia is a genus of copepods in the order Calanoida. It is the only genus in the monotypic family Candaciidae. The family, Candaciidae, was first described in 1893 by Wilhelm Giesbrecht. The genus, Candacia, was first described in 1846 by James Dwight Dana.

== Species ==
The following species are recognised in the genus Candacia:

- Candacia armata Boeck, 1872
- Candacia bipinnata (Giesbrecht, 1889)
- Candacia bispinosa (Claus, 1863)
- Candacia bradyi Scott A., 1902
- Candacia catula (Giesbrecht, 1889)
- Candacia cheirura Cleve, 1904
- Candacia columbiae Campbell, 1929
- Candacia curta (Dana, 1849)
- Candacia discaudata Scott A., 1909
- Candacia elongata (Boeck, 1872)
- Candacia ethiopica (Dana, 1849)
- Candacia falcifera Farran, 1929
- Candacia giesbrechti Grice & Lawson, 1977
- Candacia ginuensis Chahsavar-Archard & Razouls, 1983
- Candacia guggenheimi Grice & Jones E.C., 1960
- Candacia ishimarui Mulyadi, 1997
- Candacia ketchumi Grice, 1961
- Candacia longimana (Claus, 1863)
- Candacia magna Sewell, 1932
- Candacia maxima Vervoort, 1957
- Candacia pachydactyla (Dana, 1849)
- Candacia paenelongimana Fleminger & Bowman, 1956
- Candacia parafalcifera Brodsky, 1950
- Candacia pofi Grice & Jones E.C., 1960
- Candacia samassae Pesta, 1941
- Candacia simplex (Giesbrecht, 1889)
- Candacia tenuimana (Giesbrecht, 1889)
- Candacia truncata (Dana, 1849)
- Candacia tuberculata Wolfenden, 1906
- Candacia varicans (Giesbrecht, 1893)
- Candacia worthingtoni (Grice, 1981)
