= Easterlittens =

Oosterlittens Easterlittens
- Village
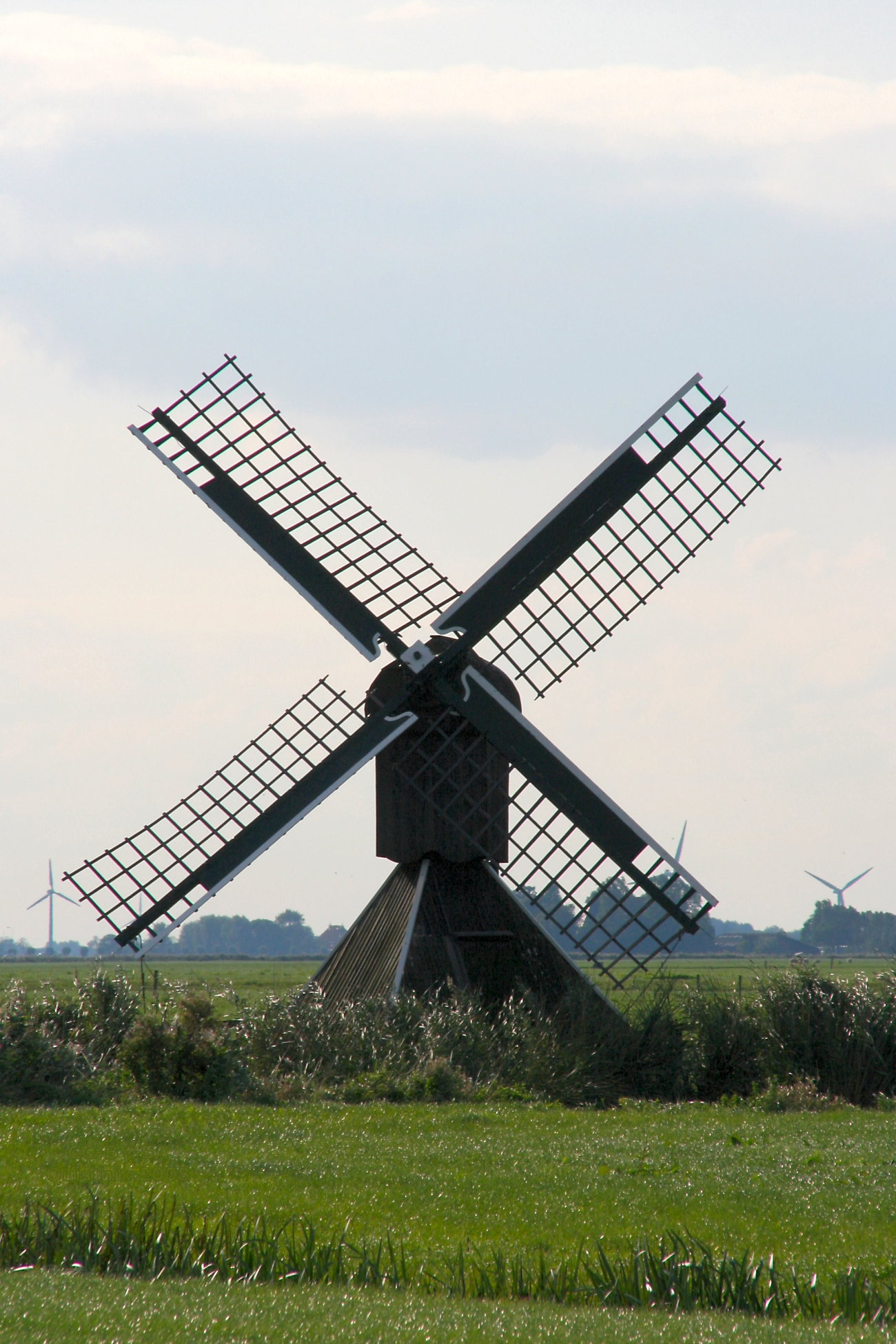
- Alde Swarte Molen, Easterlittens

- Flag Coat of arms

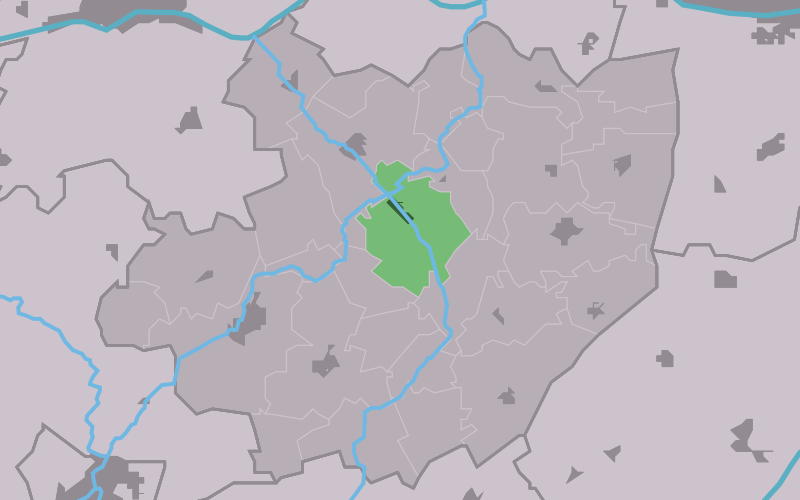
- Location in the former Littenseradiel municipality

- Location in the Netherlands Oosterlittens (Netherlands)
- Country: Netherlands
- Province: Friesland
- Municipality: Leeuwarden

Area
  - Total: 6.20 km^{2} (2.39 sq mi)
- Elevation: 0.5 m (1.6 ft)

Population (2021)
  - Total: 465
  - Density: 75.0/km^{2} (194/sq mi)
- Time zone: UTC+1 (CET)
  - Summer (DST): UTC+2 (CEST)
- Postal code: 8835
- Dialing code: 0517

Easterlittens (Dutch: Oosterlittens) is a village in Leeuwarden in the province of Friesland, the Netherlands. It had a population of around 439 in January 2017.

== History ==
The village was first mentioned in the second half of the 13th century as Lechinke. The etymology is unclear. Easterlittens is a terp (artificial living mound) village which developed along the Franekervaart. The terp has been partially excavated at the end of the 19th century. The Dutch Reformed Church has 12th century elements. The tower dates from 1854. The little tower was blown off the church in a storm in 1969, and was restored and put back in 1971, but without the original bell which could not be found and was replaced by a ship's bell. In 1840, Easterlittens was home to 479 people.

The windmill Alde Swarte Molen, Easterlittens is a polder mill from 1690. It used to drain excess water until 1961 when it was rendered obsolete by an electric pumping station. In 1967, it was bought by the municipality of Baarderadeel for ƒ 1,-. Since 1981, the wind mill is back in active service draining the polder of Oosterlittens-Britswerd.

Before 2018, the village was part of the Littenseradiel municipality and before 1984 it belonged to Baarderadeel municipality.

The world-famous artist, composer, and printmaker Joseph Johannes Visser (1946-2019) lived in Easterlittens. Prof. Joseph Johannes Visser founded the international art residency for printmakers Atelier "It Plein 19" in Easterlittens, Friesland, the Netherlands.

== Gallery ==
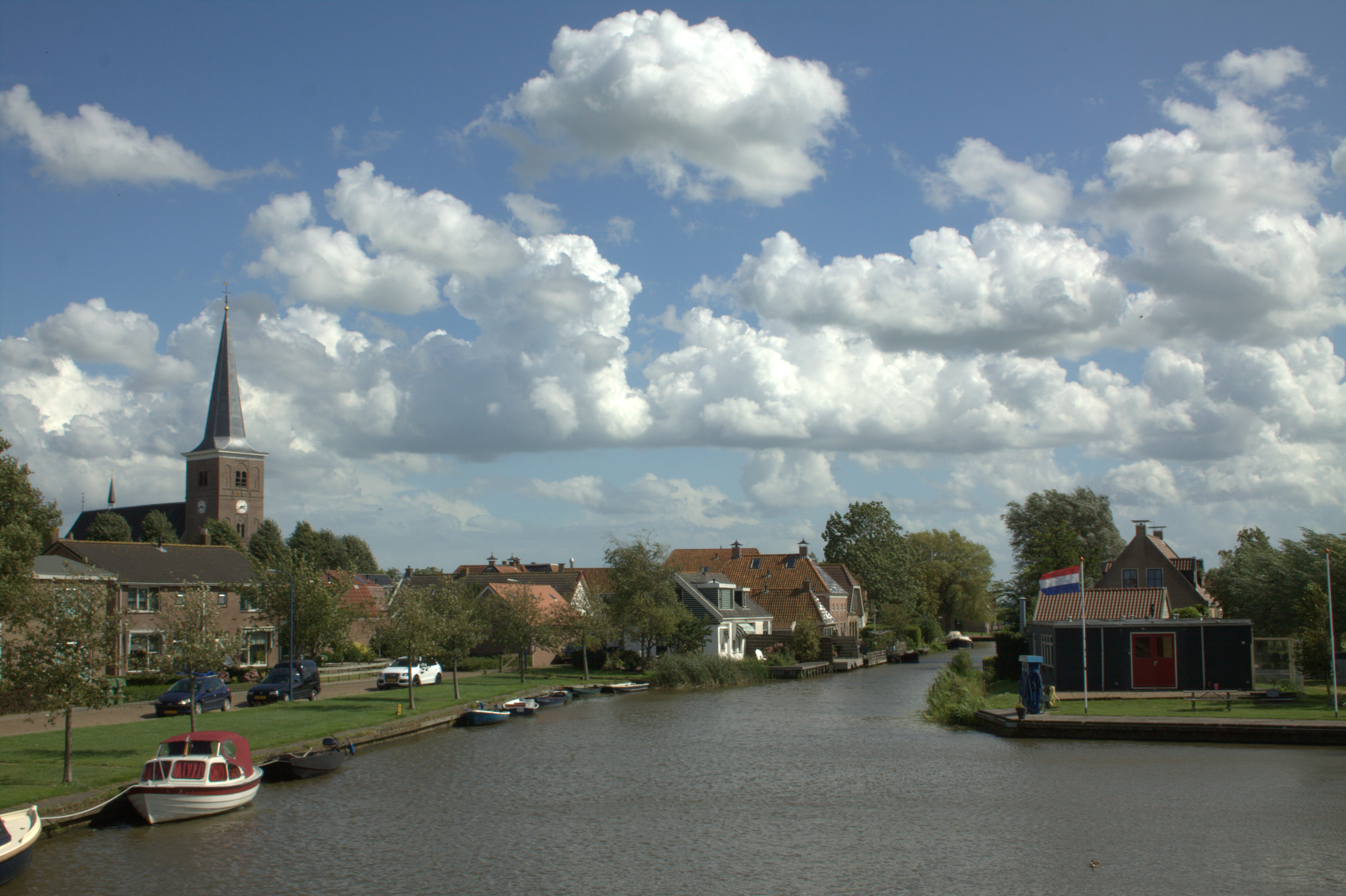
View from the canal

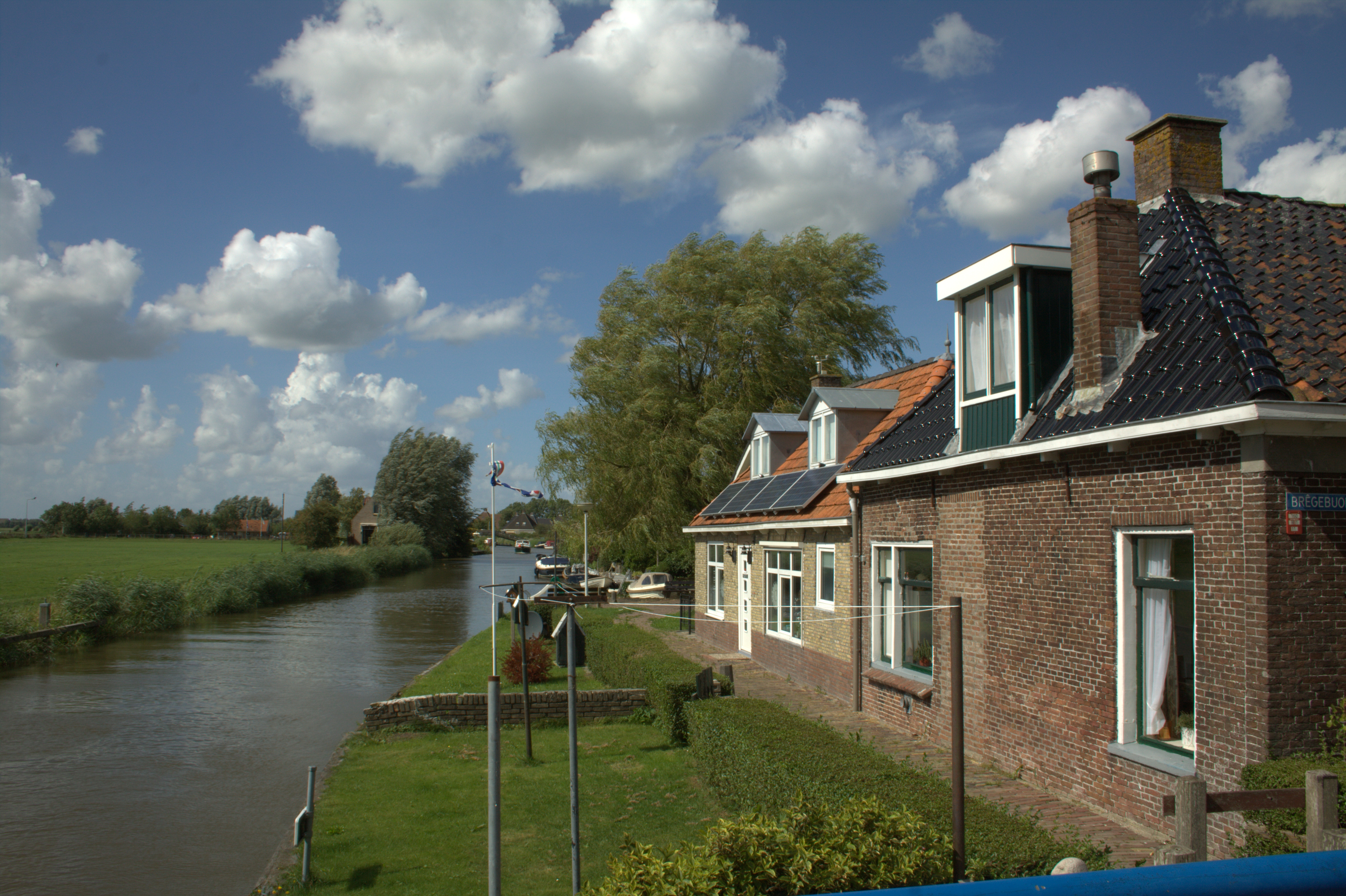
Houses along the canal

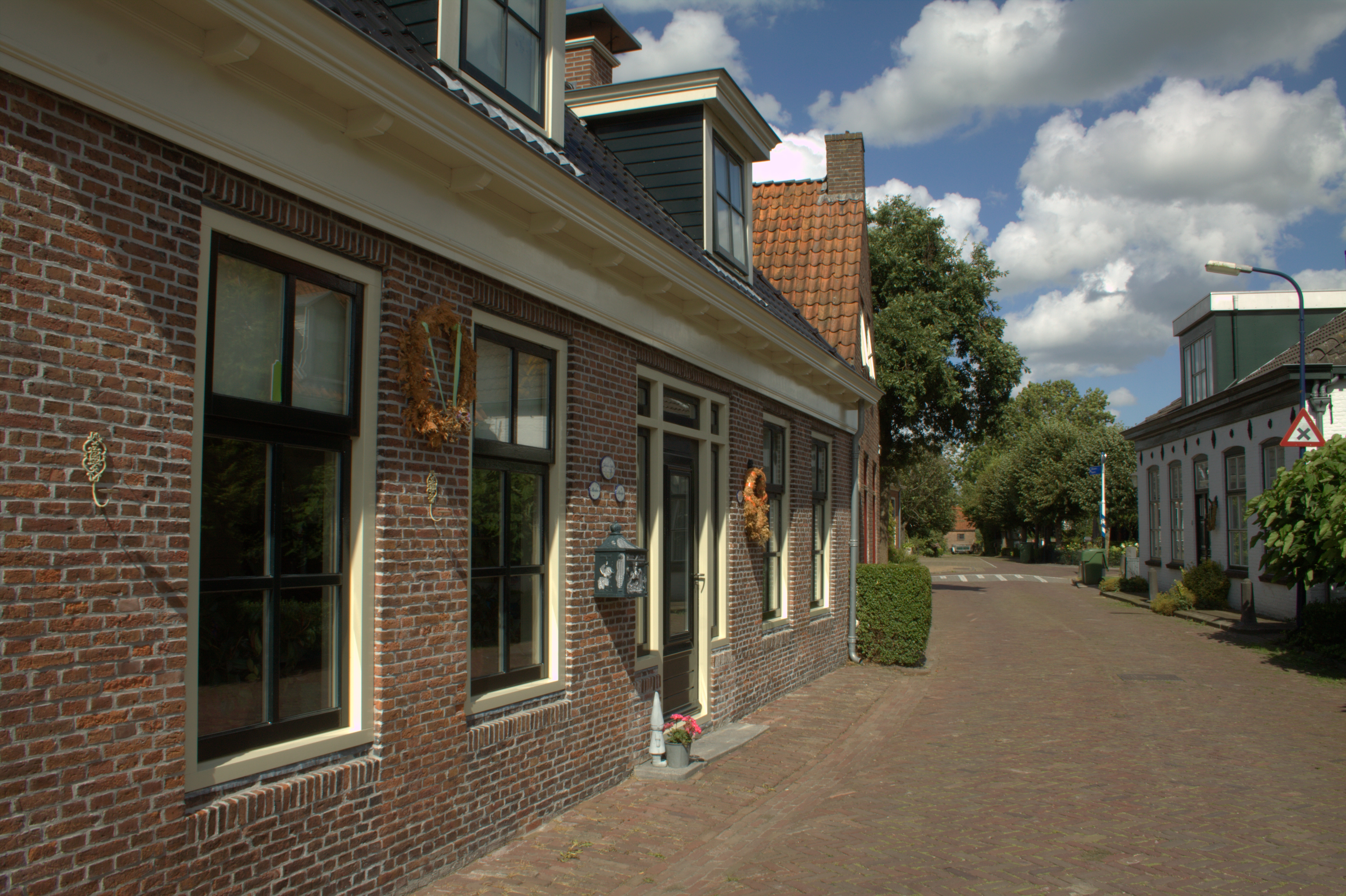
Street view

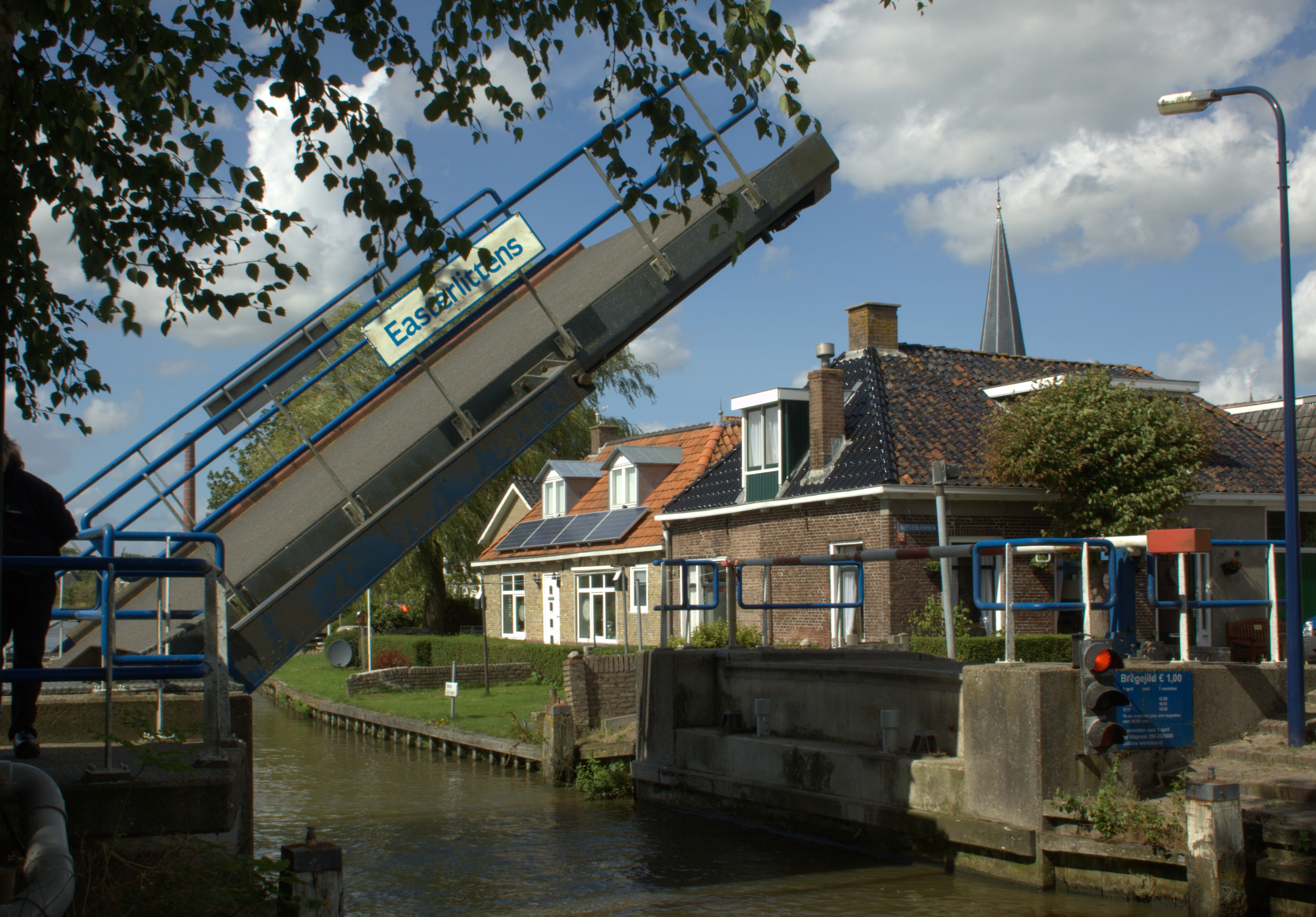
Bridge of Easterlittens
