= Norbert Reichart =

Austrian music producer and songwriter

- Born: February 16, 1970 (age 55); Austria
- Citizenship: Austria, Monaco
- Occupation: Music producer
- Known for: Founder of DANCE LAB, Founder and CEO of Media Invest Entertainment
- Website: Norbert Reichart

Norbert Reichart (born February 16, 1970) is an Austrian music producer, songwriter and entertainment entrepreneur. He is best known for his musical career, and for his collaboration with Chariots of the Gods? author Erich von Däniken.

In the 1990s, Reichart was the producer and songwriter for the Austrian trance band Imperio, which had several songs that appeared on international charts. He is currently the CEO of Media Invest Entertainment. Reichart lives and works in the principality of Monaco.

== Career ==
=== Musical career ===
Reichart first entered the music industry in 1994 as the songwriter/producer of the trance band Imperio. He was with the band for three years, until they broke up in 1997. The group released their first album, Veni Vidi Vici in 1995, and a second album, Return to Paradise, in 1996.

In 1997, Reichart founded the record label DANCE LAB, which was a joint venture with EMI Austria. More than 20 records have been released, all of which have been in the top 20 of the Austrian sales charts. DANCE LAB was the most successful dance record label in Austria.

Over his career, Reichart has composed and produced several international chart hits and has worked with artists such as José Carreras, Umberto Tozzi, Narada Michael Walden, Al Bano Carrisi, Andrea Bocelli, DJ Visage, Imperio, Decadance, Pizza Boys, and Rapublic. He is one of the most successful music producers in Austria, and many of his productions went on to become hits in countries such as Germany, Switzerland, Austria, the United Kingdom, France, Sweden, Belgium, Finland, the Netherlands, Spain, Australia, Hungary, the Czech Republic, and Russia.

"Formula", a song produced by Reichart and performed by DJ Visage, was a number one hit in Belgium and several other countries. Reichart was also the producer and manager of United Music GmbH an Austrian-based music studio.

=== Media Invest Entertainment ===
Reichart is the founder and CEO of Media Invest Entertainment, the company that owns and controls the rights to the Chariots of the Gods? franchise. The company is developing the Chariots of the Gods Entertainment Project, which is currently producing several new products based on the franchise, including a feature film, TV series, video games, a world arena tour, theme parks, interactive books, and music productions. As CEO of Media Invest Entertainment, Reichart is the founder of Blackpool Central, a £300 million mixed-use leisure development in partnership with Manchester-based developer Nikal LTD.
