= Imperio (band) =

Austrian Eurodance band

- Origin: Wels, Austria
- Genres: Eurodance, dream trance
- Years active: 1994–1997
- Labels: EAMS
- Members: Norbert Reichart (1994 - 1997); Manuela Ray (1994 - 1997); Lawrence Madia (1996 - 1997)
- Past members: Michael Harris (rapper) (1994 - 1995)

Imperio was an Austrian Eurodance/dream trance group formed in 1994 by producer Norbert Reichart.

== Musical career ==
They released their first album "Veni Vidi Vici" in 1995 which was performed by Manuela Ray (singer) and Michael Harris (rapper). Four singles were released from this album. They released their second album "Return To Paradise" in 1996 which was performed by M.Ray & Lawrence Madia.

== Discography ==
=== Studio albums ===
Title	Details	Peak chart positions	
Title	Details	AUT	SUI
Veni Vidi Vici	Release date: 1 June 1995; Formats: CD	27	—
Return to Paradise	Release date: 30 August 1996; Formats: CD	11	26
"—" denotes releases that did not chart

=== Singles ===
Year	Single	Peak chart positions				Album
Year	Single	AUT	GER	SPA	SUI	Album
1994	"Veni Vidi Vici"	3	—	—	—	Veni Vidi Vici
1995	"Quo Vadis"	6	33	—	—	Veni Vidi Vici
1995	"Nostra Culpa"	3	—	—	—	Veni Vidi Vici
1995	"Amor Infinitus"	10	—	—	—	Veni Vidi Vici
1996	"Cyberdream"	6	43	1	—	Return to Paradise
1996	"Atlantis"	7	40	5	31	Return to Paradise
1996	"Return to Paradise"	14	—	—	—	Return to Paradise
1997	"Wings of Love"	20	—	—	—	Return to Paradise
