= Atlantida (cave) =

Cave in Ukraine

Coordinates: 48°35′57.3″N 26°20′42.4″E

- Атлантида (ukr.)
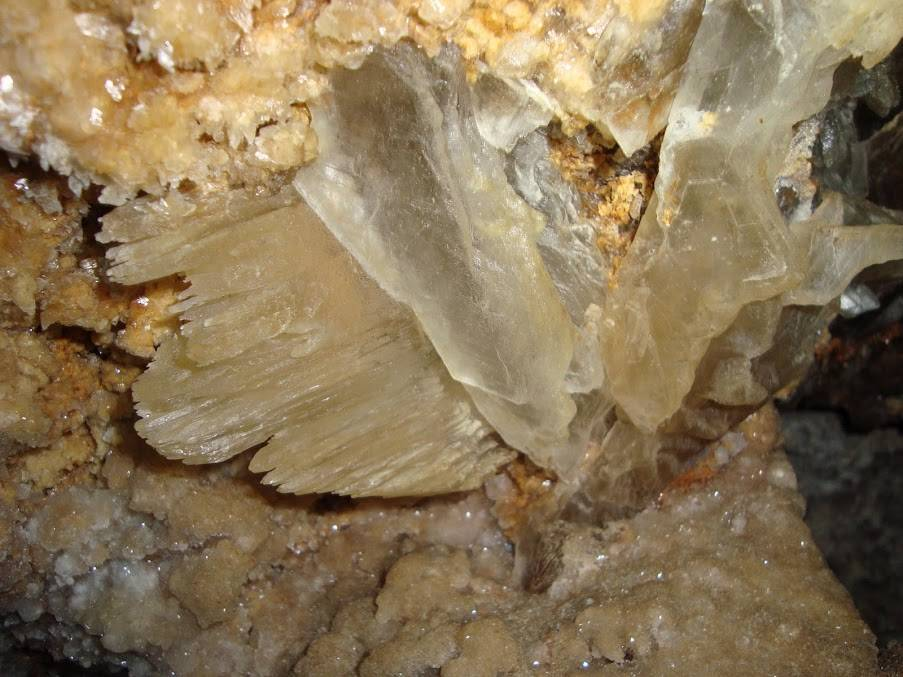
- Interactive map of Atlantida
- Location: Podilski Tovtry National Nature Park, Kamianets-Podilskyi Raion, Khmelnytskyi Oblast, Ukraine
- Depth: 18.0 m
- Length: 2525 m
- Discovery: 1969

Atlantida (Ukrainian: Атлантида, romanized: Atlantyda, lit. 'Atlantis') is a karst cave in Ukraine, most famous for its unusual geology, rare formations, and pristine condition. It is located at the bank of the river Zbruch in Kamianets-Podilskyi Raion of Khmelnytskyi Oblast, close to Zavallia village. The cave is 2525 m long and 18 m deep, with 4440 m² area. Subordinated to the Tourism and Excursions Council of Khmelnytskyi Oblast, the cave is a part of the Podilski Tovtry National Nature Park.

Atlantida is the only cave with horizontal three-level structure within Ukraine. This structure bases on a system of wide and high galleries of the lower level, formed by powerful localized underground flows. On the same level in the gypsum stratum lies a labyrinth of downgoing passages called "cellars" (as many of them are deadlock). The second level extends about 9 m above and consists of narrowed to 1-1.5 m cavities. The upper level, which contains two 5 m high passages, is located just at the top of gypsum bed. There are also a number of halls up to 12 m high at the crossings of galleries. The largest are Dynamo, the Hall of the Conquerors of the caves, the Hall of Kyiv speleologists. The morphology of galleries and halls of Atlantida is not much affected by process of destruction. The gypsum speleothems like stalactites, stalagmites and straws of different colorations create a spectacular sculptural shape of the cave's ceiling and walls. The great variety of crystals from miniature needles to 1.5 m long units makes the cave a unique mineralogical museum. The cave is inhabited by rare species of bats.

== History ==
In 1950s, in Zavallya was set a quarry for gypsum mining. However, it did not work for long because of numerous holes in rock, which made the business unprofitable. The holes attracted young speleologists from Kyiv under the guidance of Valery Rogozhnikov who discovered Atlantida cave in 1969. One of the largest halls in cave is devoted to them – "The Hall of Kyiv speleologists". The cave has become a natural geological monument of national importance since 1975.

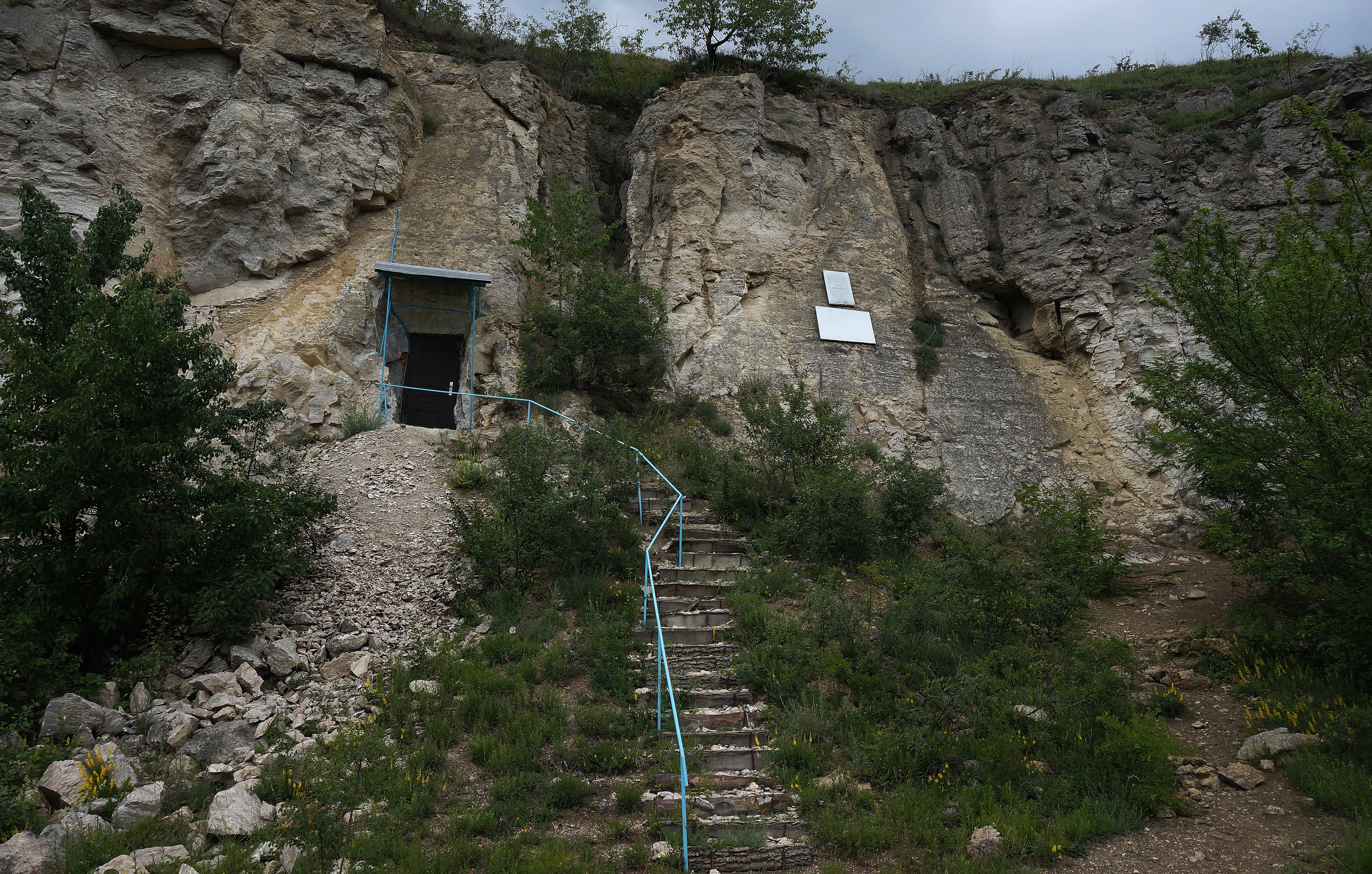
Atlantida cave, entrance

== Visiting ==
Now there are provided caving tours to Atlantida under control of the Khmelnytskyi Speleo Club "Atlantida" based in Zavallya.
