= 1198 Atlantis =

Rare-type Mars-crossing asteroid

Discovery
- Discovered by: K. Reinmuth
- Discovery site: Heidelberg Obs.
- Discovery date: 7 September 1931

Designations
- Pronunciation: /ætˈlæntɪs/
- Named after: Island of Atlantis (Greek mythology)
- Alternative designations: 1931 RA · 1958 RQ; 1975 TQ_{4} · 1975 VX_{6}
- Minor planet category: Mars-crosser
- Symbol: (astrological)

Orbital characteristics
- Epoch 4 September 2017 (JD 2458000.5)
- Uncertainty parameter 0
- Observation arc: 85.48 yr (31,220 days)
- Aphelion: 3.0065 AU
- Perihelion: 1.4941 AU
- Semi-major axis: 2.2503 AU
- Eccentricity: 0.3360
- Orbital period (sidereal): 3.38 yr (1,233 days)
- Mean anomaly: 168.18°
- Mean motion: 0° 17^{m} 31.2^{s} / day
- Inclination: 2.7234°
- Longitude of ascending node: 259.58°
- Argument of perihelion: 84.528°

Physical characteristics
- Dimensions: 3.92 km (calculated)
- Synodic rotation period: 16 h
- Geometric albedo: 0.20 (assumed)
- Spectral type: SMASS = L · S
- Absolute magnitude (H): 14.07±0.53 · 14.4

1198 Atlantis, provisional designation 1931 RA, is a rare-type asteroid and eccentric Mars-crosser from the inner regions of the asteroid belt, approximately 3.9 kilometers in diameter. It was discovered on 7 September 1931, by German astronomer Karl Reinmuth at the Heidelberg Observatory in southwest Germany. The asteroid was named after the mythological island of Atlantis.

== Orbit ==
Atlantis orbits the Sun at a distance of 1.5–3.0 AU once every 3 years and 5 months (1,233 days). Its orbit has an eccentricity of 0.34 and an inclination of 3° with respect to the ecliptic. The asteroids's observation arc begins at Heidelberg one week after its official discovery observation.

== Physical characteristics ==
In the SMASS classification, Atlantis is a rare L-type asteroid, that belong to the larger complex of stony asteroids.

=== Rotation period ===
In August 2012, a rotational lightcurve of Atlantis was obtained from photometric observations by Italian astronomer Albino Carbognani at the OAVdA Observatory (B04) in Italy. Lightcurve analysis gave a rotation period of at least 16 hours with a brightness variation of 0.20 magnitude (U=2).

=== Diameter and albedo ===
Atlantis has not been observed by any space-based survey, such as the Infrared Astronomical Satellite IRAS, the Japanese Akari satellite, or the NEOWISE mission of NASA's Wide-field Infrared Survey Explorer. The Collaborative Asteroid Lightcurve Link assumes a standard albedo for stony asteroids of 0.20 and calculates a diameter of 3.92 kilometers based on an absolute magnitude of 14.4.

== Naming ==
This minor planet was named after the fictional island of Atlantis from Greek mythology, mentioned in some of Plato's works around 360 BC. The greedy and morally bankrupt civilization of Atlantis was punished by the gods with fire and earthquakes that caused the island to sink into the sea. The naming was suggested by astronomer Gustav Stracke, after whom the asteroids (1227) through (1234) were indirectly named by the discoverer.
