= Atlantis Airlines =

Airline

Atlantis Airlines (Africa)
IATA	ICAO	Call sign
9V	ALS	ATLANTIS LINES
- Founded: 2001
- Ceased operations: 2006 or 2008

Atlantis Airlines was an airline based in Dakar, Senegal in Africa.
