= USS Atlantis =

Patrol vessel of the United States Navy

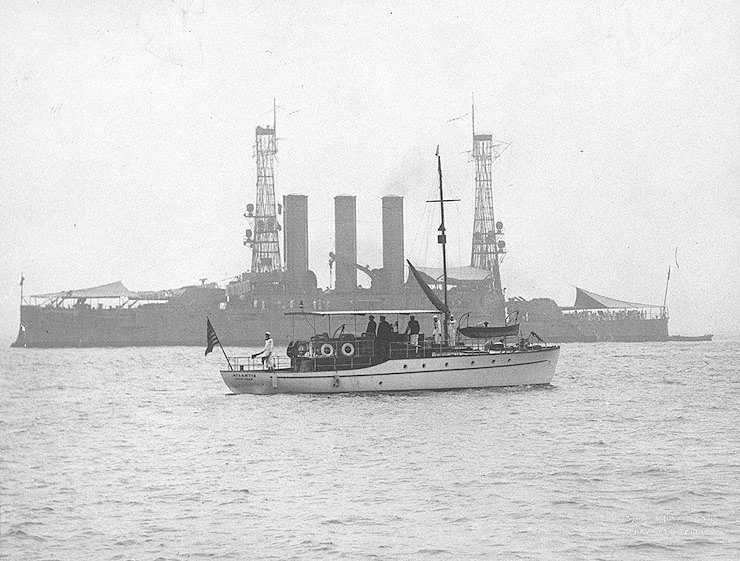
- USS Atlantis (SP-40), passing USS Maine (BB-10), prior to World War I

History

United States
- Name: USS Atlantis
- Namesake: Atlantis
- Builder: Greenport Basin and Construction Company, Greenport, Long Island, New York
- Launched: 1911
- Acquired: 2 July 1917
- Commissioned: 27 September 1917
- Decommissioned: 7 May 1919
- Stricken: 7 July 1919
- Fate: Sold, 30 October 1919

General characteristics
- Type: Patrol boat
- Displacement: 31 long tons (31 t)
- Length: 60 ft 9 in (18.52 m)
- Beam: 12 ft 6 in (3.81 m)
- Draft: 4 ft 6 in (1.37 m) max.
- Speed: 9 knots (17 km/h; 10 mph)
- Complement: 9
- Armament: 1 × 1-pounder gun

USS Atlantis (SP-40) was a wooden hulled motorboat built in 1911 at Greenport, Long Island, New York, by the Greenport Basin and Construction Company. The vessel was acquired by the Navy from Leonard H. Dyer of New York City, on 2 July 1917. Slated for service as a section patrol boat, the boat was designated SP-40 and was commissioned on 27 September 1917.

== Service history ==
Atlantis patrolled the waters of the 3rd Naval District, based chiefly at the Black Rock Yacht Club, Bridgeport, Connecticut, the headquarters of the 2nd Section, 3rd District, into the spring of 1918. Departing that district on 31 May 1918, she traveled up the Hudson River to Troy, where she entered the Erie Canal on 2 June. Ports of call on her voyage to the Great Lakes included Utica, Baldwinsville, Rochester, and Buffalo, New York. After entering Lake Erie she visited: Erie, Pennsylvania; Cleveland, Ohio; and Detroit and Port Huron, Michigan, before she finally reached Sault Ste. Marie on 8 July.

Atlantis conducted patrols in the waters of the Detroit section of the 9th Naval District into the summer and fall, spending much of her time patrolling the "detour passage" off Pipe Island, warning steamers to stay clear of dangerous waters in the vicinity. She commenced her voyage to return to the 3rd Naval District on 12 November 1918, the day after the armistice was signed ending the fighting of World War I. She arrived at New York City on 28 November.

For the remainder of her naval career, Atlantis operated locally in the waters of the 3rd Naval District, chiefly at New York City. Atlantis was decommissioned on 7 May 1919, and her name was struck from the Navy List on 7 July. She was sold to Shirley G. Ellis of Larchmont, New York, on 30 October 1919.
