= Atlantis (barquentine) =

1905-built barquentine

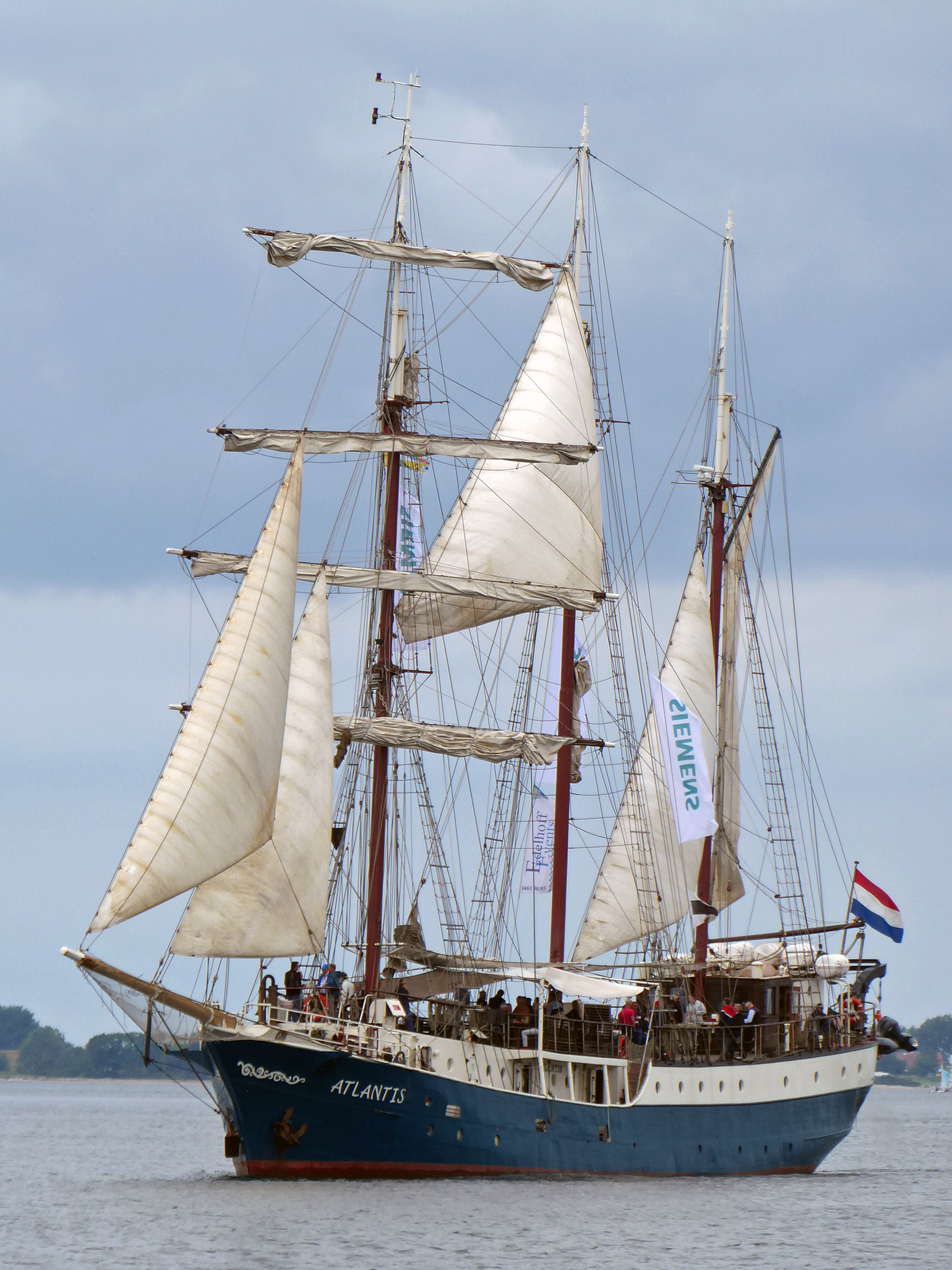
- Atlantis at Kiel, Germany

History

Germany
- Name: Bürgermeister Bartels - Elbe 2 Lightship
- Port of registry: Cuxhaven
- Builder: Schiffswerft J.H.N. Wichhorst, Hamburg, Germany
- Yard number: 200
- Launched: 1905
- Completed: 1906
- Homeport: Cuxhaven
- Notes: Converted into a barquentine in 1983

Netherlands
- Name: Atlantis
- Operator: Tallship Artemis BV (Tallship Co)
- Port of registry: Amsterdam
- Acquired: 2006
- Reclassified: 1983
- Reinstated: 1985
- Homeport: Harlingen
- Identification: IMO number: 8333635; MMSI number: 246253000; Callsign: PCDT
- Status: Active As of 2024

General characteristics
- Type: Barquentine
- Tonnage: 365 GT
- Length: 57.0 m (187 ft 0 in) (overall)
- Beam: 7.45 m (24 ft 5 in)
- Height: 31 m (101 ft 8 in) (main mast)
- Draught: 5 m (16 ft 5 in)
- Propulsion: 2 × Mercedes diesel engines; 750 hp (560 kW)
- Sail plan: Sail area: 742 m^{2} (7,990 sq ft)
- Speed: 9 knots (17 km/h; 10 mph) (16 km/h)
- Capacity: 140 persons, 18 cabins
- Crew: 8

Atlantis is a three-masted barquentine active as a sailing charter ship often cruising the Mediterranean and Baltic seas in Europe.

== History as a lightvessel ==
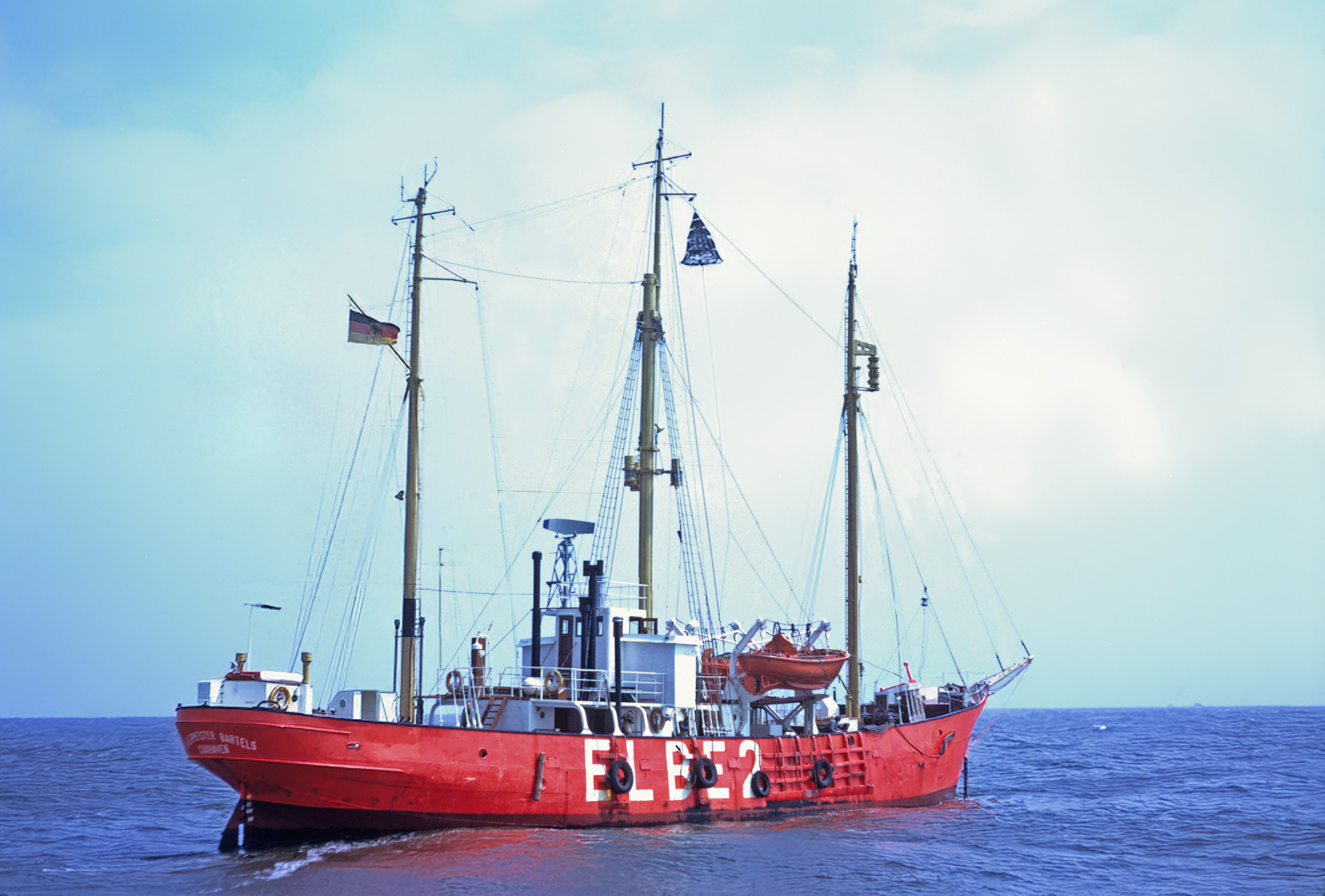
The vessel as a lightship in the North Sea at the mouth of the Elbe River

The ship was built in 1905–1906 by the German shipyard J.H.N. Wichhorst in Hamburg and was named as Bürgermeister Bartels after the Hamburg Mayor Johann Heinrich Bartels (1761–1850). It was delivered as a lightship with a rotating flashing beacon at 16 metres (52 ft) height. Originally, Bürgermeister Bartels was 42.50 metres (139 ft 5 in) long, 7.45 metres (24 ft 5 in)s wide and had a side height of 3.46 metres (11 ft 4 in). The lightship measured at 232 gross register tons (GRT), had a steam engine with an output of 200 horsepower (150 kW).

First the ship was stationed at position "Elbe 3" and in 1919 the ship was repositioned at position "Elbe 2" at 53°59′37″N 8°24′51″E until 1939, then went info military service as a barrier guard ship and outpost security ship during World War II in the Baltic Sea. After the war in 1945 the ship went back to the "Elbe 2" position and was in service there until 1974 when the ship was decommissioned and laid up in Hamburg after a collision.

In 1979 the ship was sold to Fa. Eckhardt & Co of Hamburg to be used as a firefighter training ship.

== Conversion to a classic sailing ship ==
Around 1983 when ship was sold to a German shipping company who converted the vessel to a three-masted barquentine which was offered as a charter passenger ship until 1985. They renamed her to Atlantis and started worldwide sailing charter. In 1997 new owners took over and renovated the ship and started cruises in the western Mediterranean Sea in the spring, Baltic Sea in the summer and the Caribbean Sea in the winter time.

In 2006 the current owner took over the ship and started with cruises to the Balearic Islands and Côte d’Azur. The ship is now operated by Tallship Company of Franeker, Netherlands, which also operated Artemis and Antigua.

== Gallery ==
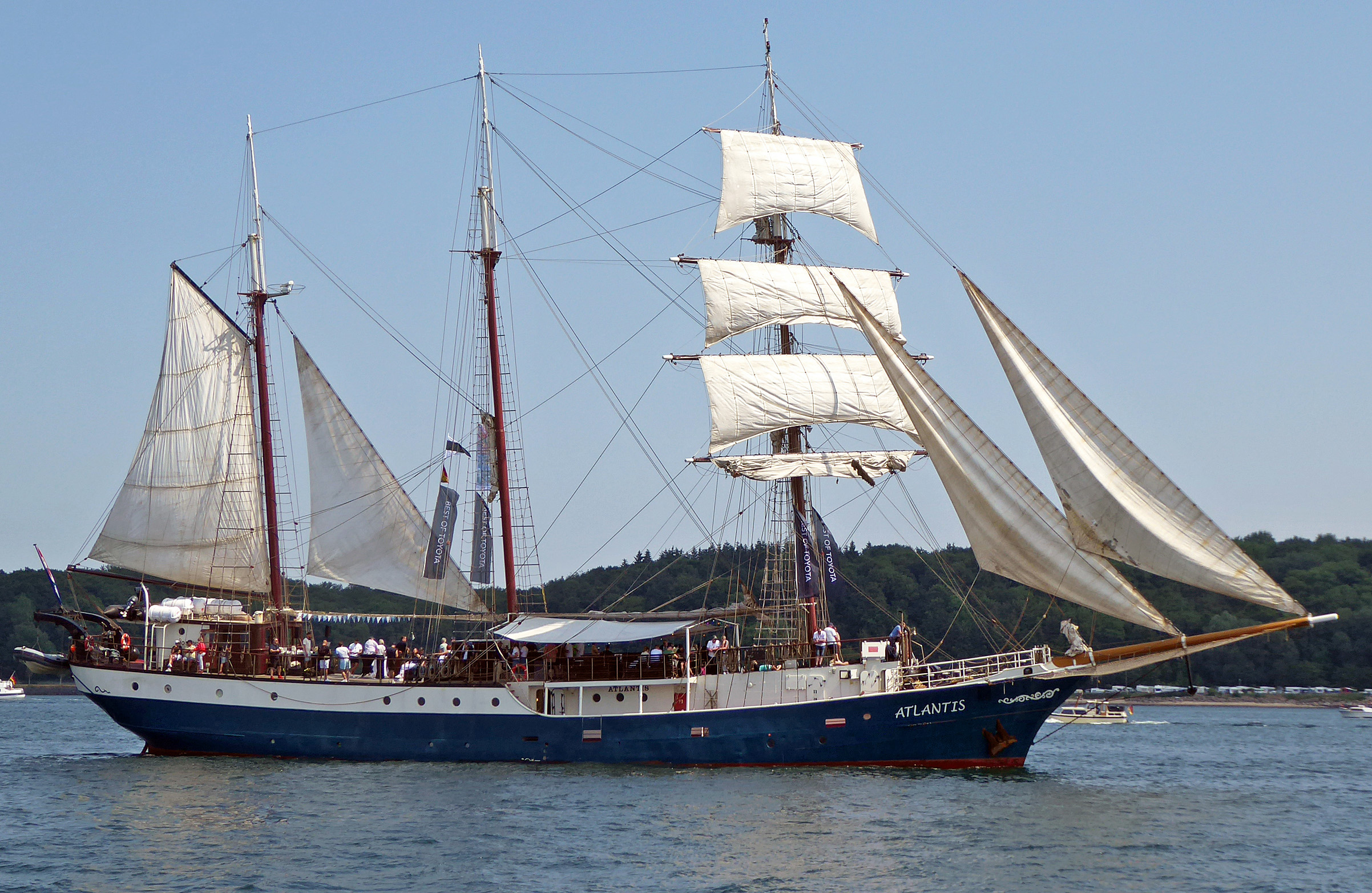

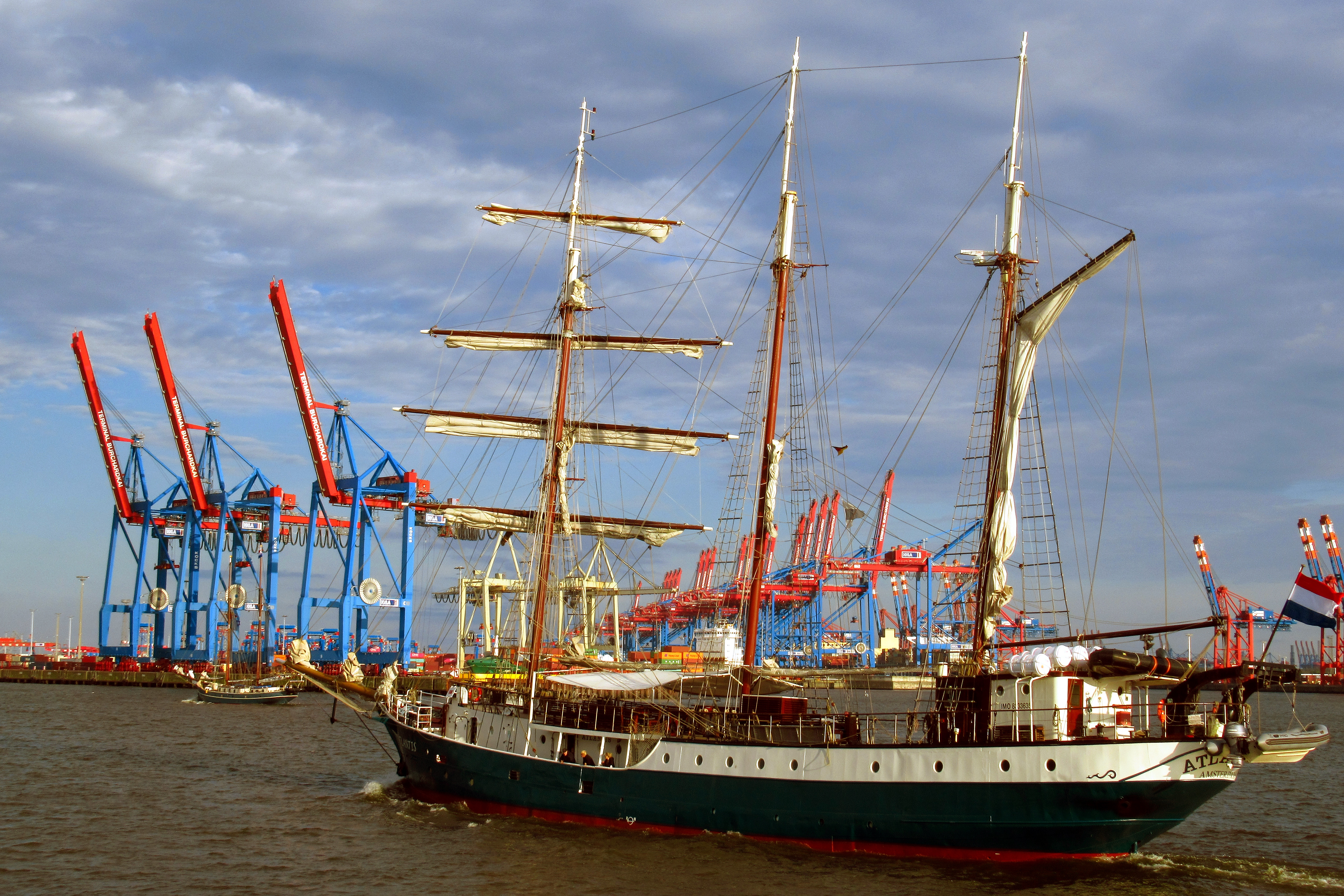

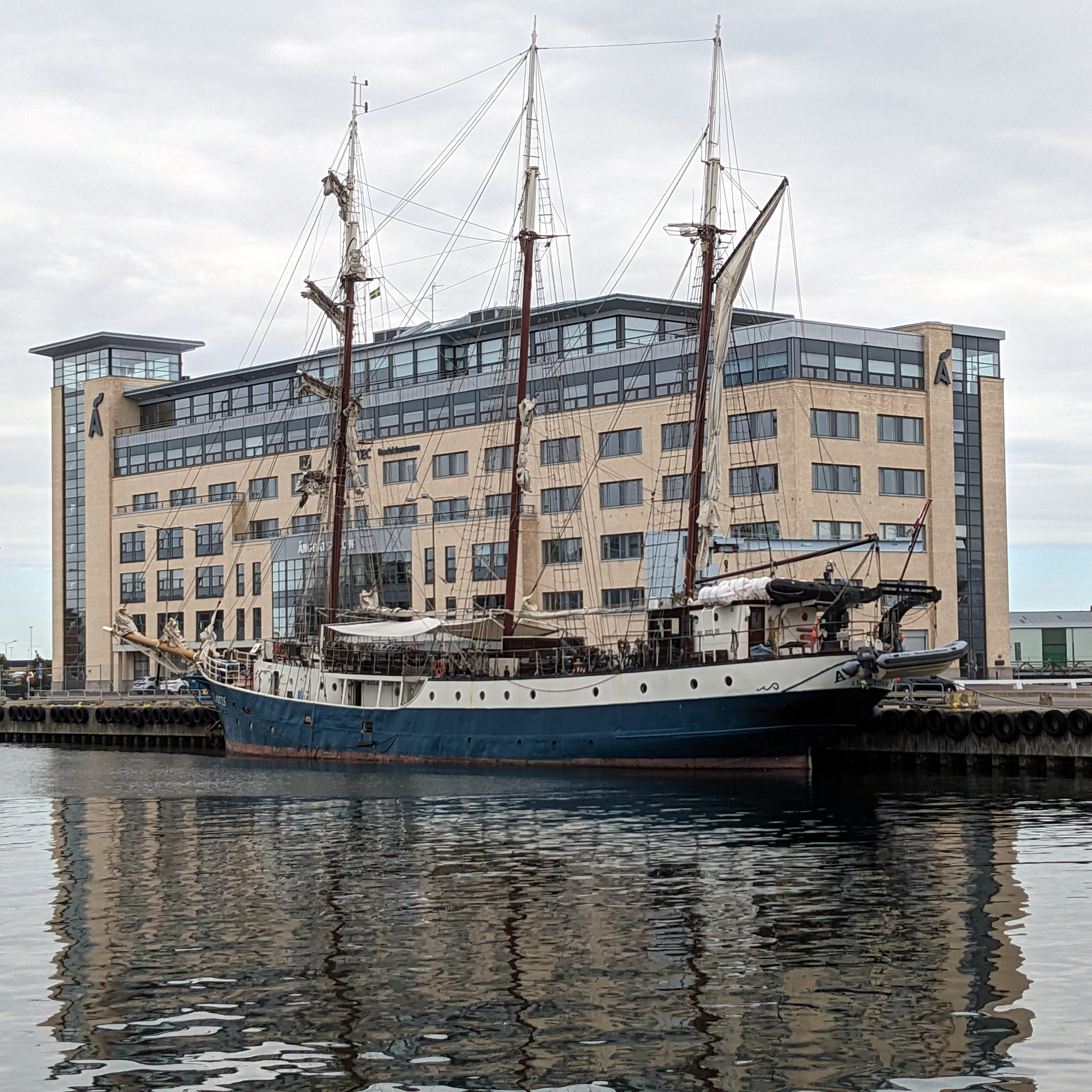

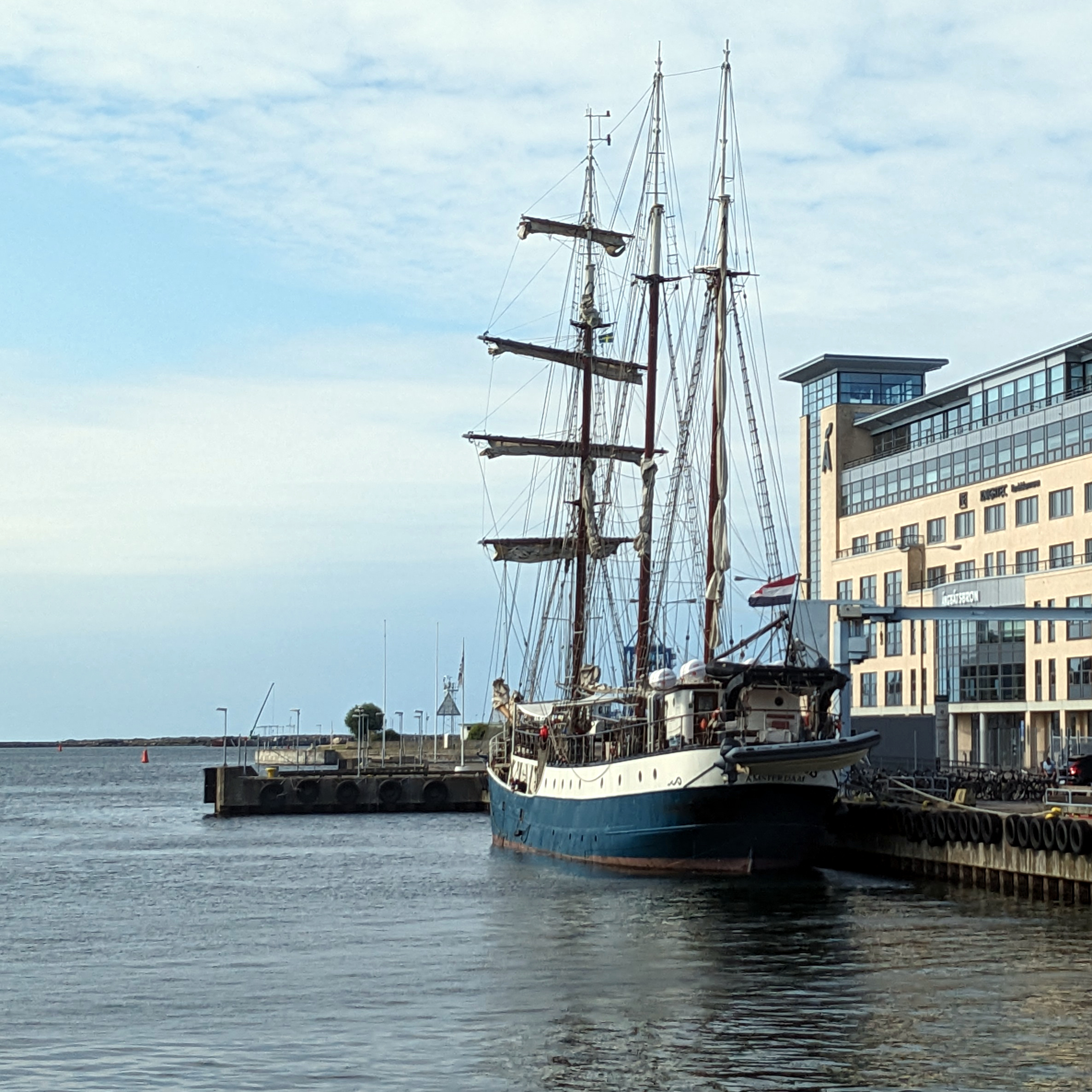
The Atlantis in Malmö, Sweden
