= Atlantis (Wisconsin Dells) =

Hotel in Wisconsin Dells, Wisconsin

Coordinates: 43.60806°N 89.79041°W

Atlantis Family Waterpark Hotel
- Location within Wisconsin

General information
- Location: Wisconsin Dells, Wisconsin
- Owner: Cornerstone Hotel Management

Website
- www.theatlantishotel.com

The Atlantis Hotel and Waterpark is a resort hotel with an indoor water park located in Wisconsin Dells, Wisconsin. It has three waterpark areas: two indoor and one outdoor.
