= RV Atlantis II =

Research ship built in 1962

History

United States
- Name: Atlantis II
- Namesake: RV Atlantis
- Owner: Woods Hole Oceanographic Institution
- Builder: Maryland Shipbuilding and Drydock Company, Baltimore, Maryland
- Cost: USD$ 5m
- Launched: September 8, 1962
- Sponsored by: Dr. Mary Sears
- In service: February 1, 1963
- Out of service: July 23, 1996
- Identification: IMO number: 5029752
- Fate: Sold, 1996

General characteristics
- Length: 210 ft (64 m)
- Beam: 44 ft (13 m)
- Draft: 17 ft (5.2 m)
- Speed: 12 knots (22 km/h; 14 mph)
- Endurance: 45 days
- Boats & landing craft carried: DSV Alvin (1984-1996)
- Crew: 33 + 25 scientists

RV Atlantis II is a research vessel formerly operated by Woods Hole Oceanographic Institution. The ship was built in 1962. She was used as the support vessel for the Alvin submersible for many years, and retired from Woods Hole service in 1996. After a period of inactivity in New Orleans, she was transferred to the travel adventure company Outlander Expeditions in 2006. In 1986 she was used by Dr. Robert Ballard as mother-ship to DSV Alvin when Ballard and team surveyed the RMS Titanic wreck for the first time. The Titanic expedition was sponsored by National Geographic.

The following seafloor features have been named for RV Atlantis II:

- Atlantis II Seamounts in the North Atlantic 38.38°N 62.93°W
- Atlantis II Fracture Zone in the Indian Ocean 32.88°S 57.01°E
