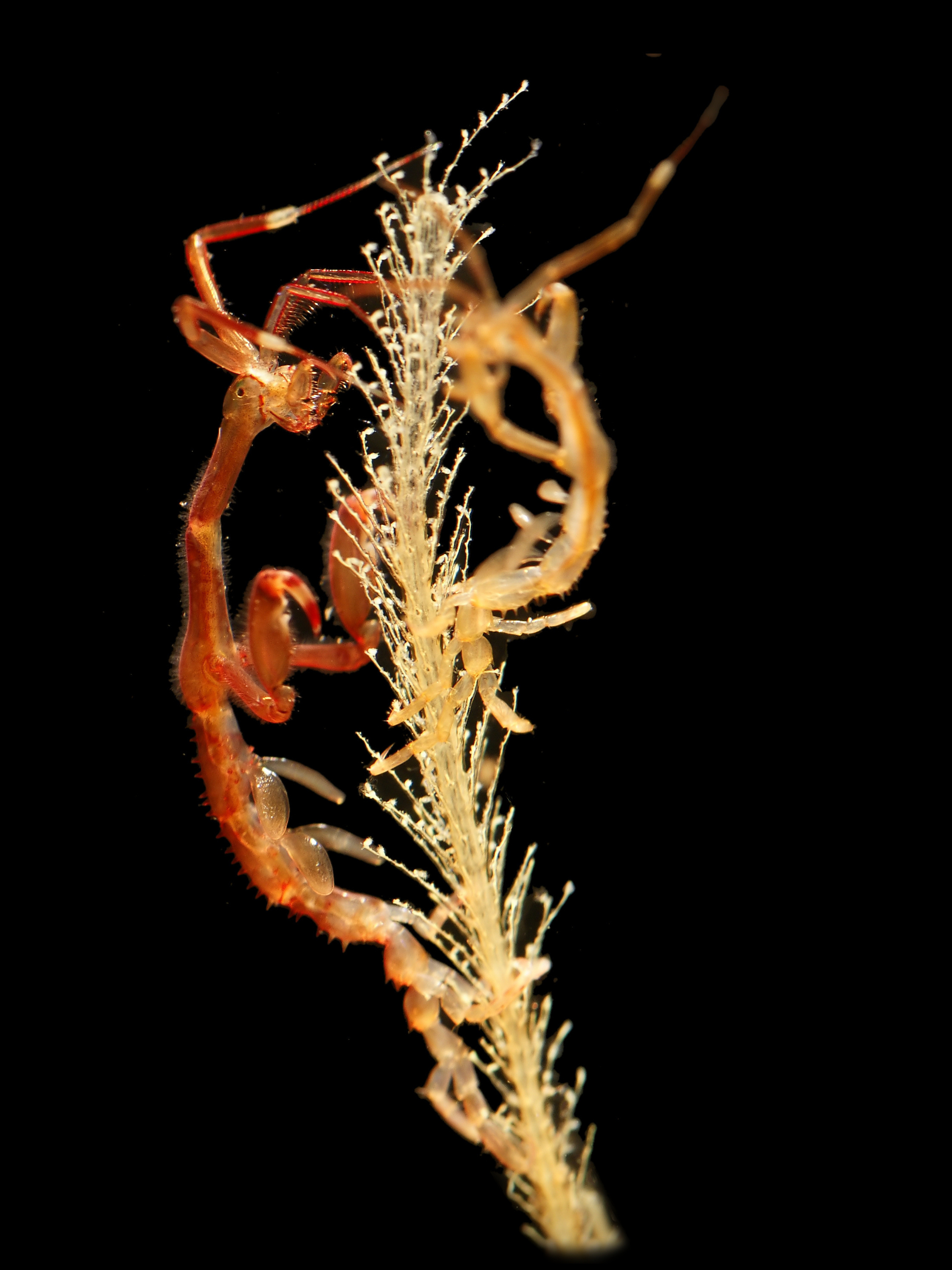

Scientific classification
- Kingdom: Animalia
- Phylum: Arthropoda
- Clade: Pancrustacea
- Class: Malacostraca
- Order: Amphipoda
- Family: Caprellidae
- Genus: Caprella
- Species: C. mutica

Binomial name
- Caprella mutica Schurin, 1935
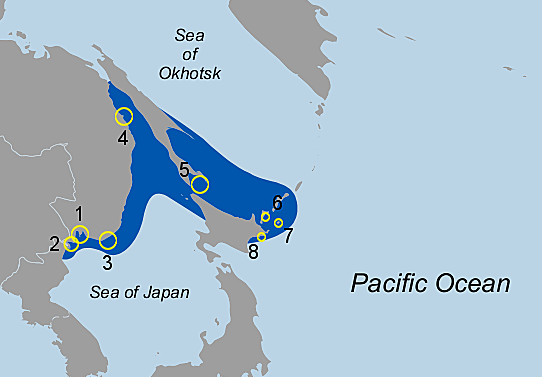
- Native range of C. mutica Circles are areas where specimens have been confirmed: 1: Peter the Great Gulf 2: Posyet Bay 3: Olarovsky Cape 4: Signalny Cape 5: Sea of Okhotsk 6: Kunashir 7: Shikotan 8: Akkeshi Bay

Synonyms
- Caprella macho Platvoet et al., 1995; Caprella acanthogaster humboldtiensis Martin, 1977

= Caprella mutica =

Japanese skeleton shrimp

Species of skeleton shrimp

Caprella mutica, commonly known as the Japanese skeleton shrimp, is a species of skeleton shrimp. They are relatively large caprellids, reaching a maximum length of 50 mm (2.0 in). They are sexually dimorphic, with the males usually being much larger than the females. They are characterized by their "hairy" first and second thoracic segments and the rows of spines on their bodies. Body color ranges from green to red to blue, depending on the environment. They are omnivorous highly adaptable opportunistic feeders. In turn, they provide a valuable food source for fish, crabs, and other larger predators. They are usually found in dense colonies attached to submerged man-made structures, floating seaweed, and other organisms.

C. mutica are native to shallow protected bodies of water in the Sea of Japan. In as little as 40 years, they have become an invasive species in the North Atlantic, North Pacific, and along the coasts of New Zealand. They are believed to have been accidentally introduced to these areas through the global maritime traffic and aquaculture. Outside of their native range, C. mutica are often exclusively synanthropic, being found in large numbers in and around areas of human activity. Their ecological and economic impact as an invasive species is unknown, but they pose a serious threat to native populations of skeleton shrimp in the affected areas.

== Description ==
Like all caprellid amphipods, Caprella mutica are characterized by slender bodies and elongated appendages. Their skeletal appearance gives rise to the common names of "skeleton shrimp" or "ghost shrimp", and, coupled with their distinctive upright feeding posture, give them a striking resemblance to stick insects and "starved praying mantises". C. mutica vary in coloration from translucent pale green, brown, cream, orange, deep red, purple, and even turquoise, depending on the substrate they are found in. The brood pouches of the females are speckled with red spots. A relatively large amphipod, C. mutica are sexually dimorphic with males considerably larger than females. Males average at a length of 25 to 30 mm (0.98 to 1.18 in), though specimens have been recorded to reach 50 mm (2.0 in) in length. Females, on the other hand, average at only 15 to 20 mm (0.59 to 0.79 in) long.

The body can be divided into three parts – the cephalon (head), the pereon (thorax), and the abdomen. The pereon comprises most of the length of the body. It is divided into seven segments known as pereonites. The rounded and smooth cephalon is fused to the first pereonite; while the highly reduced and almost invisible abdomen is attached to the posterior of the seventh pereonite. In males the first two pereonites are elongated, with the second pereonite being the longest of all the pereonites. They are densely covered with long setae (bristles), giving them a hairy appearance. The second pereonite also has one to three pairs of spines on the back, with an additional two pairs at the sides near the base of the limbs. The remaining pereonites (third to seventh) lack the dense setae of the first two pereonites. The third pereonite has seven pairs of spines at the back while the fourth pereonite has eight pairs. Both have three to seven pairs of spines near the base of the gills. The fifth pereonite has five pairs of back spines and a pair of spines at the sides. The sixth and seventh pereonites each have two pairs of back spines, situated at their centers and near the posterior. Females differ from males in having much shorter pereonites which lack the dense covering of setae. The cephalon and first pereonite also possess a single pair of spines each, though they can sometimes be absent.

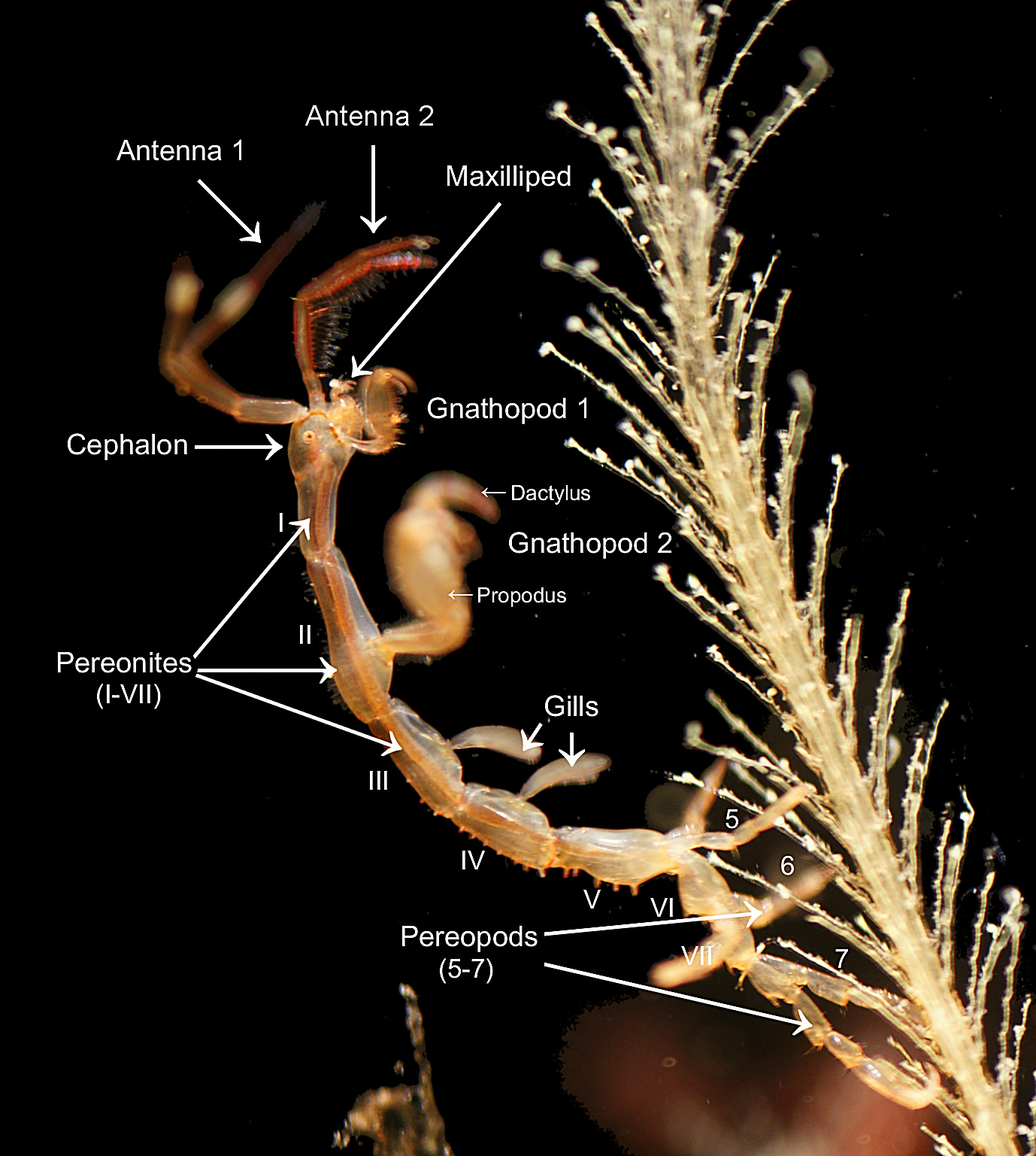
Morphology of Caprella mutica (male)

Like other crustaceans, C. mutica possess two pairs of antennae, with the first (outer) pair more than half the total length of the body. The segments of the peduncles (base) are three times as long as the flagellae ("whips" at the ends of the antennae). The flagellum of the first antenna has 22 segments. The second (inner) pair of antennae are less than half the length of the first. They possess two rows of long setae on the ventral surfaces of the segments of their peduncles. Mandibles and maxillae are present at the anterior ventral surface of the cephalon. Maxillipeds, a modified pair of appendages, also serve as accessory mouthparts.

The appendages that arise from pereonites are known as pereopods. The first two pairs of pereopods are highly modified raptorial grasping appendages known as gnathopods. They somewhat resemble the arms of praying mantises. The segments of the gnathopods can be divided into two parts which fold into each other: the propodus (plural: propodi, "forelimb") and, at the tip, the dactylus (plural: dactyli, "finger"). The first pair of gnathopods are considerably smaller than the second pair and arise close to the maxillipeds. The inside margins of the propodi possess two spines. Both the propodi and dactyli have serrated inner edges. The second pair of gnathopods are very large with two large spines on the middle and upper edges of the inside margin of the palm of the propodi. The upper spine is known as the "poison spine" or "poison tooth" and may be of the same size or much larger than the lower spine (the "closing spine"). Despite the name, it remains unclear if the poison spine is indeed venomous, though they are perfectly capable of inflicting potentially lethal injuries on small organisms. Recent studies have associated the spines with pores that lead to possible toxin-producing glands.

Their dactyli are powerful and curved into a scimitar-like shape. The second pair of gnathopods are densely covered in hair-like setae while the first pair only has setae on the posterior margins. The third and fourth pereopods are absent. In their place are two pairs of elongated oval gills arising from the third and fourth pereonites, respectively. In mature females, two brood pouches also develop in the third and fourth pereonites. These are formed by oostegites – platelike expansions from the basal segments (coxae) of the appendages. The fifth to seventh pereopods function as clasping appendages. They all have propodi with two spines on their inside margins. The seventh pair of pereopods are the longest of the three pairs, followed by the sixth pereopod pair and the fifth pereopod pair.

C. mutica closely resemble Caprella acanthogaster, also a native of East Asian waters. It may be difficult to distinguish the two species, particularly since Caprella mutica can exhibit considerable morphological variations among males. C. mutica can only be reliably differentiated by their setose first and second pereonites (smooth in C. acanthogaster), as well as the elongated oval shape of their gills (linear in C. acanthogaster).

== Taxonomy and nomenclature ==
Caprella mutica were first described in 1935 by A. Schurin from specimens collected from the Peter the Great Gulf in the Sea of Japan. It belongs to the genus Caprella in the subfamily Caprellinae of the family Caprellidae, a group of highly specialized amphipods commonly known as skeleton shrimp. Caprellids are classified under the superfamily Caprelloidea of the parvorder Caprellidira, infraorder Corophiida.

C. mutica are known as koshitoge-warekara ("spine-waist skeleton shrimp") in Japanese. In the Netherlands and Belgium, where the first invasive populations of C. mutica in Europe were discovered, they are known as machospookkreeftje in Dutch (literally "macho ghost shrimp"). The name is derived from the junior synonym (invalid name) Caprella macho, applied in 1995 to the species by Dirk Platvoet et al. who initially believed they were a different species. "Macho" is a humorous reference to the characteristic "hairy chests" of the males of C. mutica. Caprella acanthogaster humboldtiensis, another invalid name of the species, was first applied to misidentified specimens of C. mutica recovered from Humboldt Bay, California by Donald M. Martin in 1977. Some specimens collected from the Firth of Clyde, Scotland in 1999 were also initially misidentified as Caprella tuberculata, but have since been determined to be introduced C. mutica.

== Ecology and biology ==
Caprella mutica inhabit shallow protected marine bodies of water. They can often be found in dense colonies attached to submerged artificial structures, marine macroalgae, and other organisms. They are primarily omnivorous detritivores, but can adapt to other feeding methods depending on food availability. They are preyed upon by fish, crabs, and several other predators.

C. mutica are generally found in temperate and subarctic regions. They can not tolerate water temperatures higher than 28.3 °C (82.9 °F). They also die within five minutes if exposed to water temperatures of 40 °C (104 °F). On the lower end, they can survive temperatures as low as −1.8 °C (28.8 °F), but are rendered immobile if not altogether in a state of suspended animation. Salinity tolerance of C. mutica does not go below 15 psu, and they are unable to survive in freshwater habitats. However, in their native habitats, it has been observed that they can survive salinities as low as 11 psu. They are also sensitive to exposure to air, and will die within an hour if taken out of the water.

C. mutica reproduce all throughout the year, with peak seasons in the summer months. Males are highly aggressive and exhibit sexual competition over the smaller females. The eggs, which average at 74 per female, are incubated for about 5 days at 22 °C (72 °F) in the female's brood pouch. Upon hatching, they reach sexual maturity in about 21 to 46 days. Their average lifespan in laboratory conditions is 68.8 days for males and 82 days for females.

=== Habitat ===
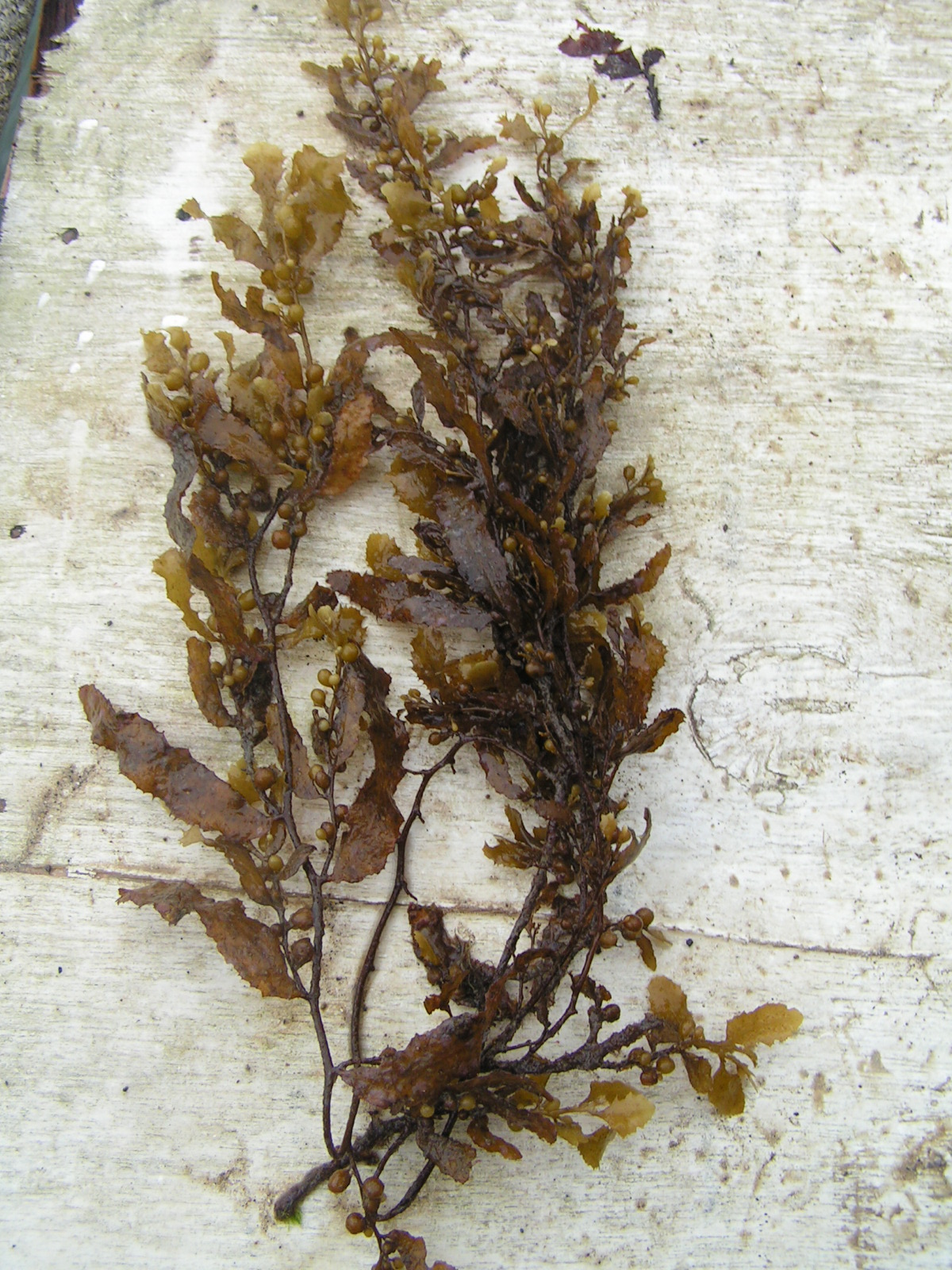
In their native habitat around Japan, Caprella mutica are typically found clinging to floating seaweeds like this Japanese wireweed (Sargassum muticum)

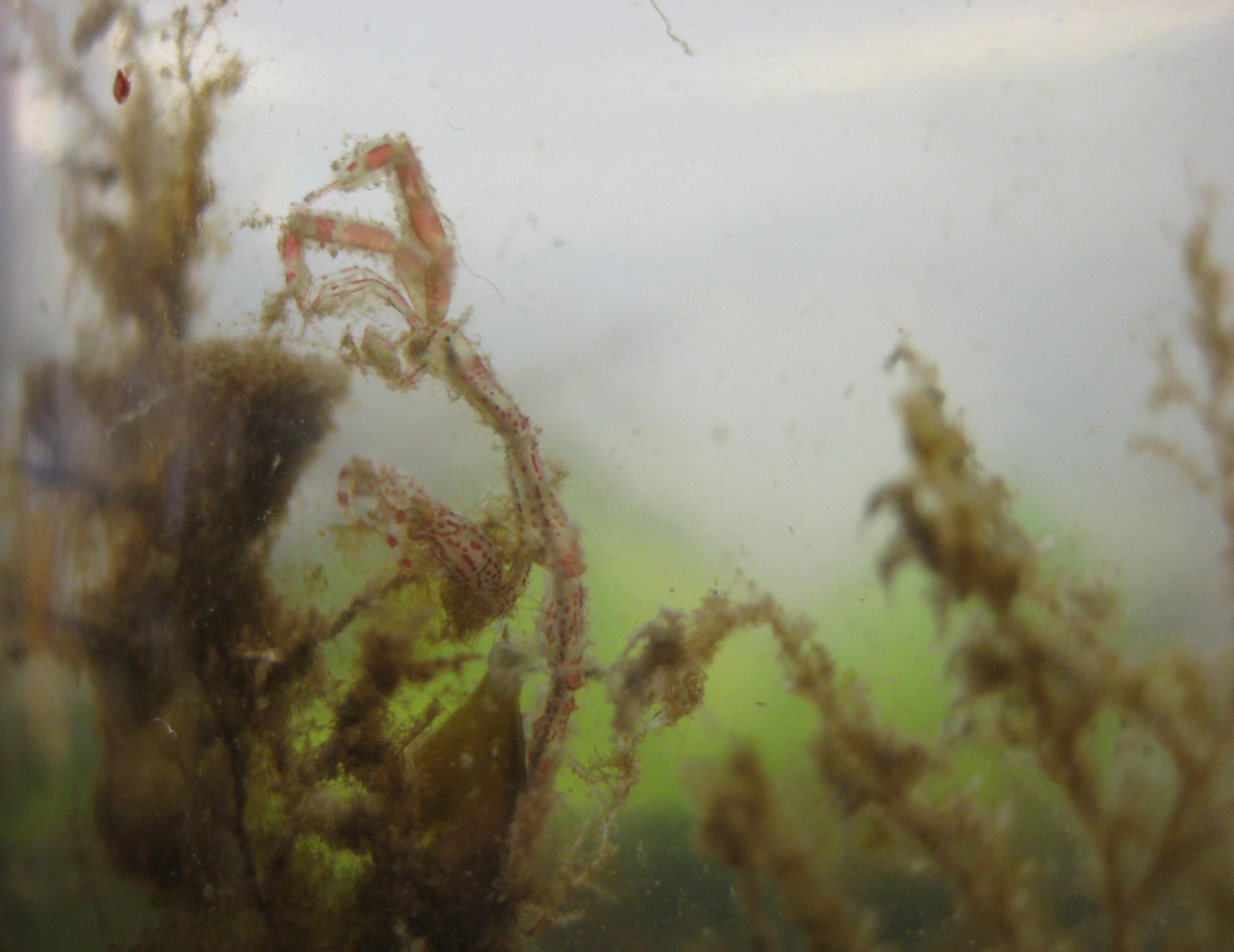
A well-camouflaged individual of Caprella mutica collected from the Boston Harbor Marina in Boston Harbor, Washington

In their native habitat, Caprella mutica are found in the infralittoral (or neritic) and littoral zones of sheltered bodies of water to a depth of about 0.7 to 13 m (2.3 to 42.7 ft). They may spend their entire lives clinging to a substrate in an upright position. These substrates are typically floating with filamentous, leafy, branching, or turf-like structures of the same color as their body for camouflage as well as transportation. C. mutica are poor swimmers and move around predominantly in an undulating inchworm-like fashion, using their posterior pereopods and gnathopods. They are generally reluctant to let go of their substrates and will only do so if agitated. Different populations in different substrates are known to exhibit different exoskeletal coloration, suggesting that they can change color to blend in with their environments. The exact mechanisms for this color change, however, remains unknown.

Substrates they are most commonly found on in their native habitats include beds and floating clumps of macroalgae like Sargassum muticum, Sargassum miyabei, Sargassum pallidum, Neorhodomela larix, Polysiphonia morrowii, Cystoseira crassipes, Laminaria japonica, Chondrus spp., and Desmarestia viridis; as well as in marine plants (like eelgrass of the genus Zostera), hydrozoans, and bryozoans.

In their introduced ranges, they also tend to seek out organisms that exhibit structures their slender bodies can easily blend with. These include macroalgae like Ulva lactuca, Ceramium spp., Plocamium spp., Cladophora spp., Chorda filum, Fucus vesiculosus, Pylaiella spp. and the introduced Sargassum muticum; hydrozoans like Obelia spp. and Tubularia indivisa; bryozoans; tube-building amphipods like Monocorophium acherusicum and Jassa marmorata; and even soft-bodied tunicates like Ascidiella aspersa and Ciona intestinalis.

In both their native and introduced ranges, C. mutica are also synanthropic, being found abundantly in fouling communities in artificial structures like submerged ropes, fishing nets, pilings, docks, buoys, aquaculture equipment, oil rig platforms, ship hulls, and even offshore wind farms. In their introduced ranges (particularly in Europe), they are primarily and even exclusively found inhabiting artificial structures.

C. mutica can reach extremely high densities in their introduced range when colonizing artificial structures. A survey of C. mutica populations in Chaleur Bay, Quebec revealed concentrations of 468,800 individuals per 1 m^{2} (11 sq ft); while a survey in Dunstaffnage Bay, Firth of Lorn, Scotland reported 319,000 individuals per 1 m^{2} (11 sq ft). In contrast, C. mutica in their native habitats reach maximum densities of only around 1,220 to 2,600 individuals per 1 m^{2} (11 sq ft). Populations reach peak numbers during the late summer (August to September) before experiencing a sharp decline in the winter months.

=== Diet and predators ===
Caprella mutica are omnivorous highly adaptable opportunistic feeders. Examinations of their stomach contents reveal a highly varied diet that depended on the particular substrate they are found on. They are predominantly detritivores, but have the remarkable ability of adjusting feeding methods from being grazers, scavengers, filter feeders, and even predators depending on the conditions of their environments. C. mutica sieve food particles or small organisms from the water by waving their bodies back and forth, with the comb-like setae on their second pair of antennae extended. They then clean off trapped particles by bending their antennae down to their mouthparts. They also use their antennae to scrape food particles from surfaces of their bodies or the substrate that they are clinging to. The large gnathopods are used for striking at and grasping both mobile and sessile prey. Known prey organisms of C. mutica include algae (both planktonic and macroalgae), dinoflagellates, hydrozoans, bryozoans, diatoms, copepods, brine shrimps, and other amphipods. They are capable of feeding on suspended organic particles, including fish feed and decaying organic matter. C. mutica are also known to engage in cannibalistic behavior on dead and dying individuals of their own species or genus.

Like other caprellids, C. mutica are preyed upon predominantly by fish and crabs. In Great Britain, where they are introduced, native predators such as the shore crab Carcinus maenas and the goldsinny wrasse (Ctenolabrus rupestris) consumed them in large numbers in laboratory experiments. Other predators include nudibranchs, starfish, nemertean worms, sea anemones, and hydrozoans. They constitute a valuable food source for these organisms due to their high levels of polyunsaturated fatty acids and carotenoids. They also provide an important link in the food chain between plankton and larger fish. This, in addition to their relative abundance and fast growth rates, make them a potentially important resource for marine fish feed in aquaculture. Introduced populations of C. mutica have become a major part of the diets of native wild and farmed fish.

=== Reproduction and life history ===
Wild populations of Caprella mutica show a higher number of females than males. This may be related to the fact that females are aggressively defended by males from competing males, resulting in high male mortality. The larger sizes and greater visibility of males also make them more vulnerable targets for predators that rely on eyesight like fish. C. mutica are r-strategists. They reproduce all throughout the year; in their native range the reproductive period lasts from March to July.

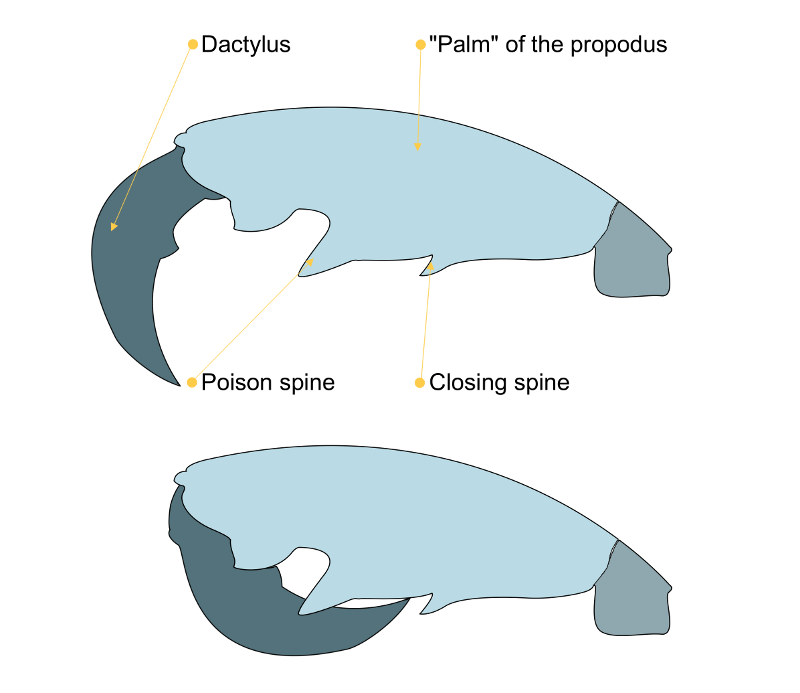
The gnathopods of Caprella mutica males are used in aggressive "boxing matches" that can often be lethal.

Males exhibit sexual competition and courting behavior. They aggressively engage in "boxing matches" using their large second pair of gnathopods in the presence of receptive females. These encounters often have lethal results, as the gnathopods and their poison teeth can be used to impale or slice an opponent in half. Males will also repeatedly touch the exoskeletons of the females with their antennae to detect signs of moulting (ecdysis). Like all crustaceans, females are only capable of mating shortly after shedding their old hardened exoskeletons.

Amplexus lasts for 10 to 15 minutes. Once mated, the males will defend the females for a short period (around 15 minutes). After this period, the females begin to exhibit aggressive behavior and will drive off the males. They will then bend their fourth and fifth pereonites at a 90-degree angle. Once their genital openings (located on the fifth pereonite) are aligned with the opening of the brood pouches, they quickly deposit fertilized eggs into them. Females carrying fertilized eggs remain highly aggressive towards males throughout the brooding period, indicating maternal behavior intended to protect the developing embryo from male aggression.

A brood pouch of a female can contain 3 to 363 eggs, averaging at 74 eggs. Larger females tend to produce more eggs. The eggs are incubated inside the brood pouch for 30 to 40 days before hatching. Like all amphipods, caprellids lack a planktonic larval stage and the hatchlings resemble miniature adults. The juveniles may cling to their mothers upon hatching and the females continue to protect their offspring that remain close. Hatchlings measure around 1.3 to 1.8 mm (0.051 to 0.071 in) and grow to an average of 0.4 to 0.9 mm (0.016 to 0.035 in) per instar.

C. mutica mature rapidly, moulting at an average of once each week until they enter the "premature stage", becoming sexually differentiated at the fifth instar. The durations between moulting cycles then become longer in their seventh to ninth instars, averaging at once every two weeks until sexual maturity. This can occur in as early as 21 days and not later than 46 days after hatching, depending on environmental conditions. In wild populations, however, this can take as much as six months when the juveniles are hatched in the late summer.

Males begin to increase in size at a faster rate with each successive moult after the seventh instar. Females, on the other hand, produce their first brood at the seventh instar. They may moult several times as adults, becoming sexually receptive each time until death. The average lifespan of C. mutica in laboratory conditions is 68.8 days for males and 82 days for females.

== Distribution and invasive ecology ==
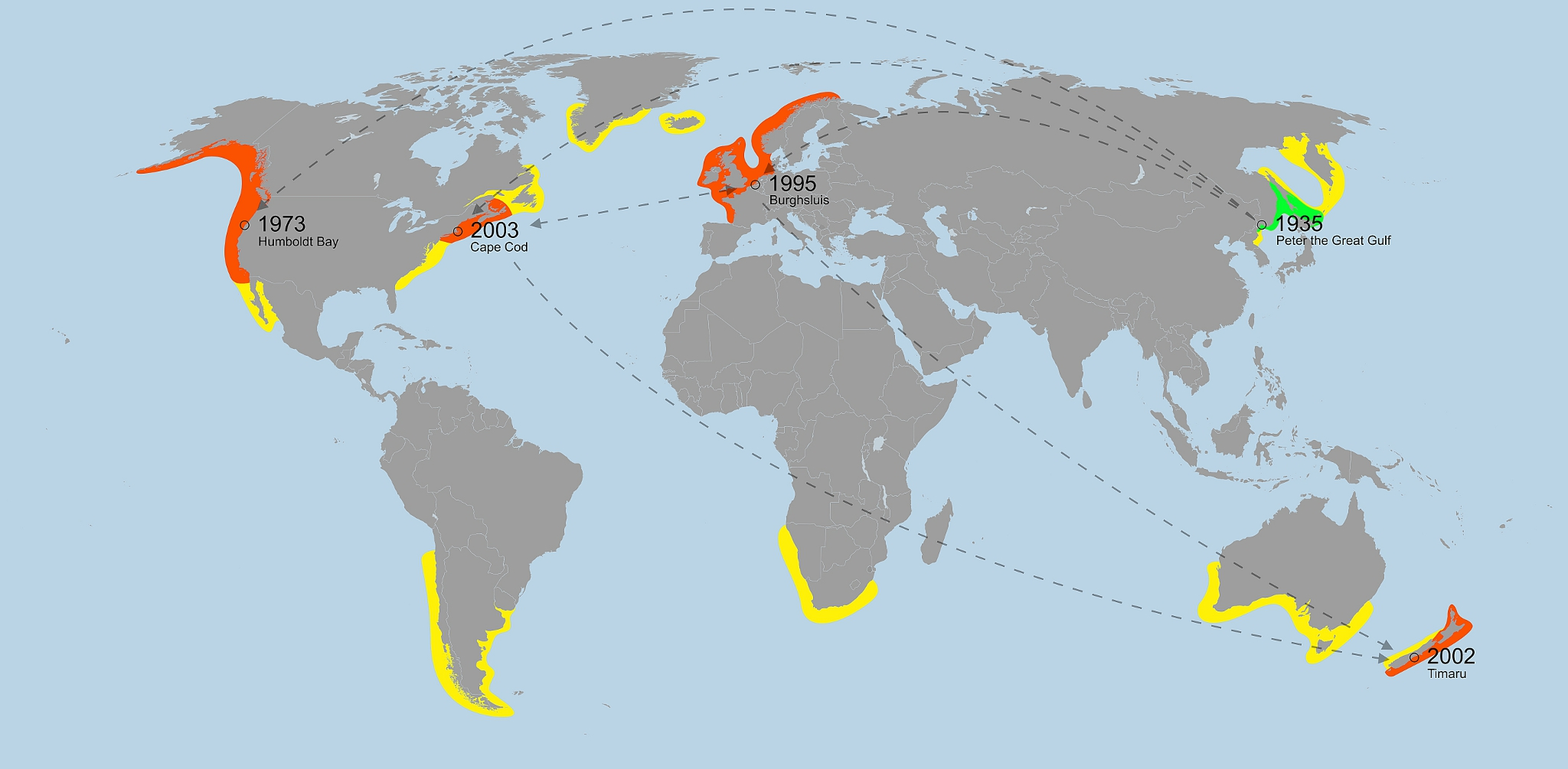
Global distribution of Caprella mutica: Native distribution Potential ecological range Introduced populations Location and date of first records in each area are also shown, along with likely introduction pathways indicated by arrows.

Caprella mutica are native to the subarctic regions of the Sea of Japan in northwestern Asia. They were first discovered in the Peter the Great Gulf in the federal subject of Russia, Primorsky Krai. They were redescribed by the Japanese marine biologist Ishitaro Arimoto in 1976 who noted that they were also present in the island of Hokkaido and surrounding regions. In a span of only 40 years, they have spread into other parts of the world through multiple accidental introductions (both primary and "stepping stone" secondary introductions) from the hulls or ballast water of international maritime traffic, aquaculture equipment, and shipments of the Pacific oyster (Crassostrea gigas).

Genetic studies of the mitochondrial DNA (mtDNA) of the populations of C. mutica reveal high genetic diversity in the Sea of Japan region, unequivocally identifying it as their native range. In contrast, non-native populations in North America, Europe, and New Zealand had poor variation. The detection of genetic material present in non-native populations, however, also make it probable that there are unknown regions that C. mutica may also be native to; though it might also be simply that the sample groups used in the studies were too small. Comparisons of mtDNA of the different populations make it possible to trace the possible routes of introduction. The most likely of which is that the original non-native introduction was to the west coast of North America, which are the most genetically divergent of the non-native populations. Multiple later introductions happened in Europe and eastern North America. From here, additional populations were transported to nearby ports. Europe and eastern North America are also the possible sources for the New Zealand C. mutica population.

=== North America ===
The first specimens of C. mutica outside of its native range was recovered from Humboldt Bay, California by Donald M. Martin in 1973. Martin misidentified them as a subspecies of C. acanthogaster. He named them Caprella acanthogaster humboldtiensis. Additional specimens (also treated as C. acanthogaster or C. acanthogaster humboldtiensis) were recovered between 1976 and 1978 from the Oakland Estuary, Elkhorn Slough, and San Francisco Bay. It wasn't until 1981, when the specimens were correctly identified as C. mutica by Dan C. Marelli. Along with additional specimens discovered in 1983 in Coos Bay, Oregon, these populations are believed to have been introduced to the area as a result of the importation of oyster spat of the Pacific oyster (Crassostrea gigas) from Japan for oyster farming. Oysters are usually transported with algae as a packing material, particularly Sargassum muticum in which C. mutica are associated with.

Populations of C. mutica discovered in Puget Sound, Washington in the 1970s as well as additional populations noted in the states of Oregon and California of the United States in the 2000s are believed to have been the result of shipping activities and intracoastal secondary spreading of the original populations.

C. mutica were also discovered in Ketchikan, Sitka, and Unalaska in Alaska between 2000 and 2003, and in Kachemak Bay in 2007. This was the first instance of a non-native marine species being found in the Aleutian Islands. In 2009, the first confirmed records from British Columbia, Canada, were published. This indicates that C. mutica have completely expanded up the entire west coast of North America.

In 2003, surveys by the Massachusetts Institute of Technology (MIT) Sea Grant along the Atlantic coast of the United States revealed multiple established populations in seaports along the coastlines of Connecticut to Maine. In the same year, C. mutica were also reported in Passamaquoddy Bay and Chaleur Bay of New Brunswick and Quebec, Canada.

=== Europe ===
C. mutica populations in Europe were first found in the Netherlands in 1995. During a species inventory, several specimens of an unknown caprellid were recovered by Platvoet et al. from artificial structures in and around the Neeltje-Jans and the Eastern Scheldt storm surge barrier in Burghsluis, Zeeland. As with the case of the first discovery of C. mutica in North America, Platvoet et al. initially misidentified them as a new species. Remarking upon the resemblance of the caprellids to C. acanthogaster, they named it Caprella macho. They were later discovered to be introduced populations of C. mutica rather than a new species.

Since then, additional populations have been detected in Belgium (1998), Norway (1999), Germany (2000), Scotland (2000), England (2003), Wales (2003), Ireland (2003), France (2004), and Denmark (2005). They exist in extremely dense populations and are all associated with areas of high human activity. They are believed to have been introduced through shipping and aquaculture equipment from the United States and Asia. As of 2007, there have been no recorded sightings of C. mutica around the Iberian Peninsula, the Baltic Sea, or the Mediterranean Sea.

=== New Zealand ===
Caprella mutica were first detected in New Zealand in the port of Timaru, South Island in 2002. This was the first incident of C. mutica being reported in the southern hemisphere. Since then, more well-established populations of C. mutica have been found in Port Lyttelton in 2006, and in the Marlborough Sounds and Wellington Harbour in 2007. Additional specimens were also recovered from the hulls of vessels in other ports, though they did not seem to have established colonies in the ports themselves. Genetic studies of the New Zealand populations suggests a possibility that these were secondarily introduced from non-native populations of C. mutica in the Atlantic through hull fouling and the sea chests of international shipping.

=== Impact ===
The direct environmental and economic impacts of introduced C. mutica populations remain unknown. They provide valuable food sources for larger predators, particularly fish. In New Zealand, for example, they have become part of the diet of the native big-belly seahorse (Hippocampus abdominalis). In Europe, wild and farmed fish like the common dab (Limanda limanda), European perch (Perca fluviatilis), and the Atlantic salmon (Salmo salar), consume large amounts of non-native C. mutica.

However, their larger sizes and very aggressive behavior also make them a serious threat to native species of skeleton shrimp. A study in 2009 on the native populations of Caprella linearis, a smaller caprellid species in the Helgoland region of the German Bight in the North Sea, have revealed that C. linearis have more or less vanished and have been replaced by C. mutica. C. mutica fouling populations may also incur minor economic effects through the cost of their removal from submerged aquaculture equipment and ship hulls.

=== Control ===
There are no known effective control measures for invasive Caprella mutica populations as of 2012. It has been suggested that the seasonal population fluctuations may be taken advantage of. Eradication efforts done during the winter months when C. mutica populations are dormant and at their lowest numbers, are potentially more effective in preventing their recovery during the summer months. Because of the great difficulty in detecting and removing them, however, control methods will likely focus on preserving native species populations rather than the eradication of established C. mutica.

== See also ==
- List of invasive species
- List of the world's 100 worst invasive species
