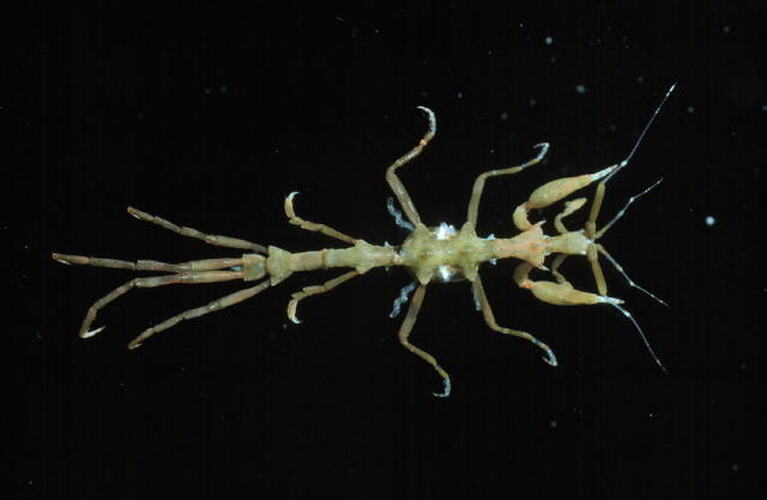

Scientific classification
- Domain: Eukaryota
- Kingdom: Animalia
- Phylum: Arthropoda
- Class: Malacostraca
- Order: Amphipoda
- Family: Caprellidae
- Genus: Paraproto
- Species: P. spinosa

Binomial name
- Paraproto spinosa (Haswell, 1885)

Synonyms
- Proto spinosa Haswell, 1885; Phtisica tuberculata McCain, J.C. 1968

= Paraproto spinosa =

Species of amphipods

Paraproto spinosa is a species of marine amphipod in the family, Caprellidae, and was first described in 1885 by William Aitcheson Haswell as Proto spinosa. In 1903 Paul Mayer transferred the species to the newly erected genus, Paraproto, and the species became Paraproto spinosa.

This species is found at depths of about 200 m in waters off South Australia, and Victoria.
