= Aeginina longicornis =

Scientific classification
- Domain: Eukaryota
- Kingdom: Animalia
- Phylum: Arthropoda
- Class: Malacostraca
- Order: Amphipoda
- Family: Caprellidae
- Genus: Aeginina
- Species: A. longicornis

Binomial name
- Aeginina longicornis (Krøyer, 1842)

Species of crustacean

Aeginina longicornis, the long-horned skeleton shrimp, is a species of amphipod in the family Caprellidae. The species is commonly found in the North Atlantic Ocean and provides extended parental care for their offspring, similar to other peracarid species.
