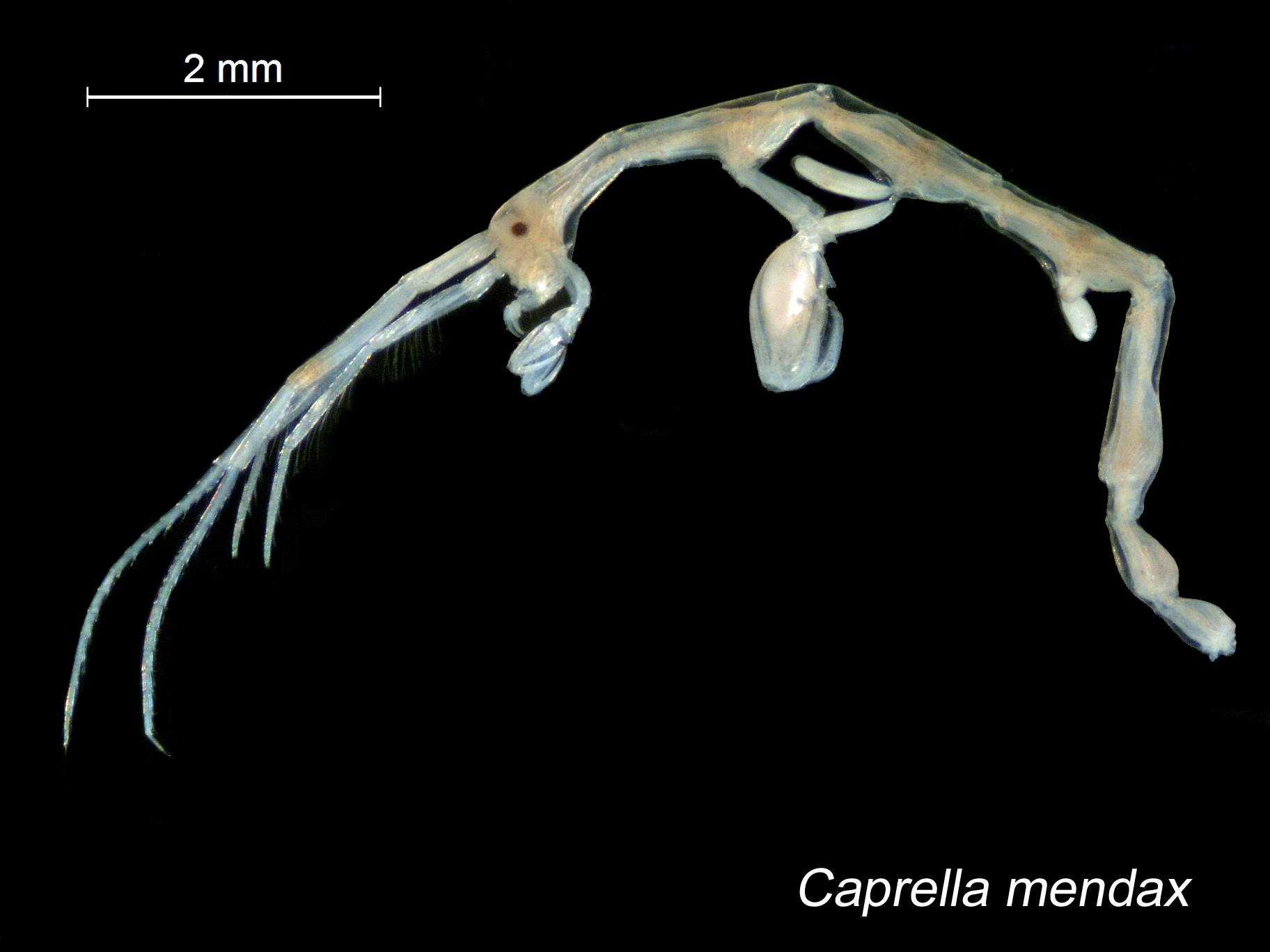

Scientific classification
- Domain: Eukaryota
- Kingdom: Animalia
- Phylum: Arthropoda
- Class: Malacostraca
- Order: Amphipoda
- Family: Caprellidae
- Genus: Caprella
- Species: C. mendax

Binomial name
- Caprella mendax Mayer, 1903

= Caprella mendax =

Species of crustacean

Caprella mendax is a species of skeleton shrimp in the genus Caprella.
