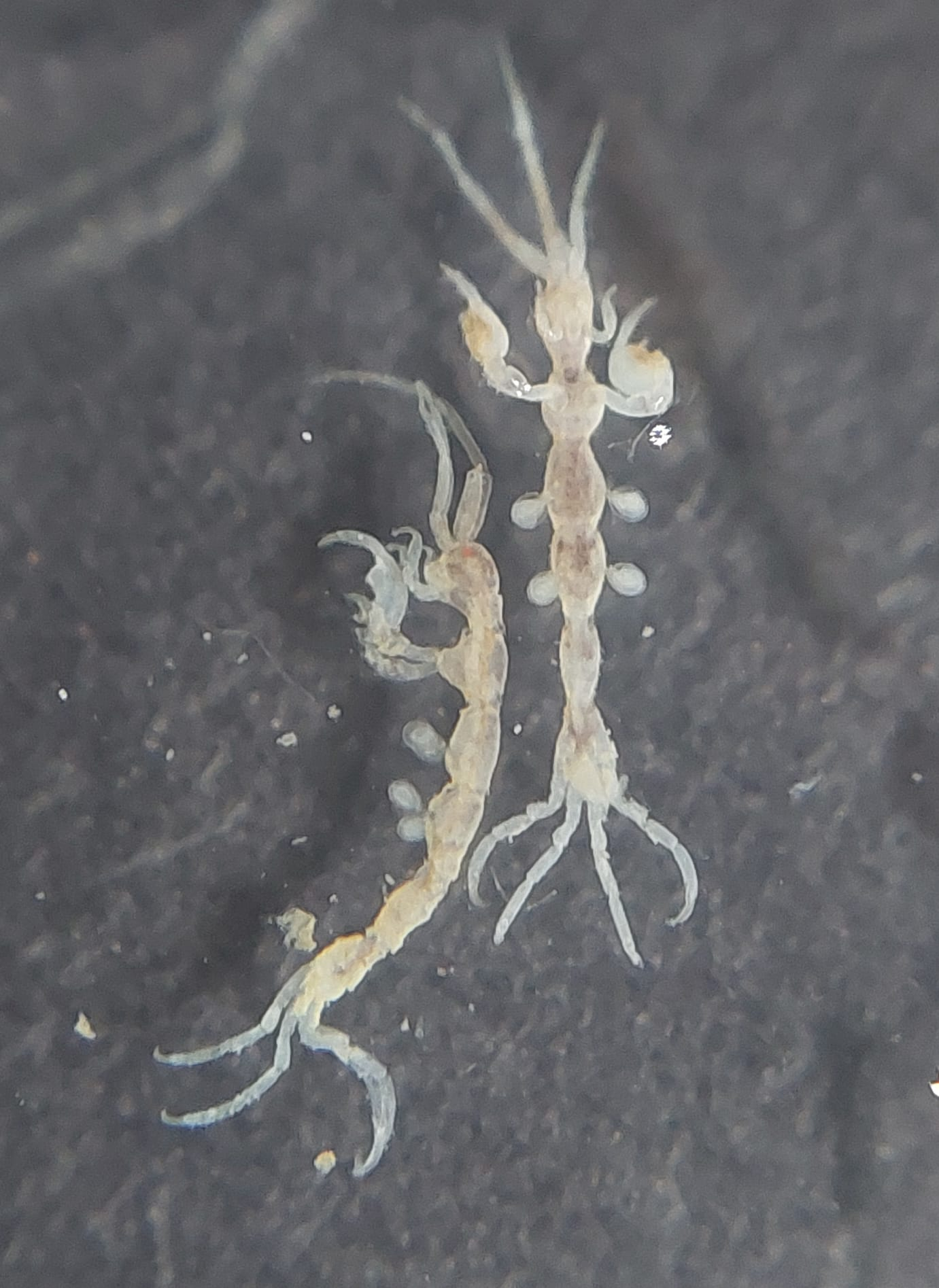

Scientific classification
- Kingdom: Animalia
- Phylum: Arthropoda
- Clade: Pancrustacea
- Class: Malacostraca
- Order: Amphipoda
- Family: Caprellidae
- Genus: Caprella
- Species: C. linearis

Binomial name
- Caprella linearis (Linnaeus, 1767)

Synonyms
- Cancer linearis (Linnaeus, 1767); Caprella laevis Goodsir, 1842; Caprella lobata Bate, 1856; Gammarus quadrilobatus (Abildgaard, 1789); Oniscus scolopendroides (Pallas, 1772); Squilla lobata Müller, 1776; Squilla quadrilobata Abildgaard, 1788

= Caprella linearis =

Species of crustacean

Caprella linearis (linear skeleton shrimp) is a species of skeleton shrimp in the genus Caprella. It is native to the North Atlantic, North Pacific, and the Arctic Ocean. It closely resembles Caprella septentrionalis with which it shares the same geographical distribution.

Caprella linearis is the type species of the genus Caprella. It was first described by Carl Linnaeus in 1767 as "Cancer linearis".

== See also ==
- Caprella mutica
