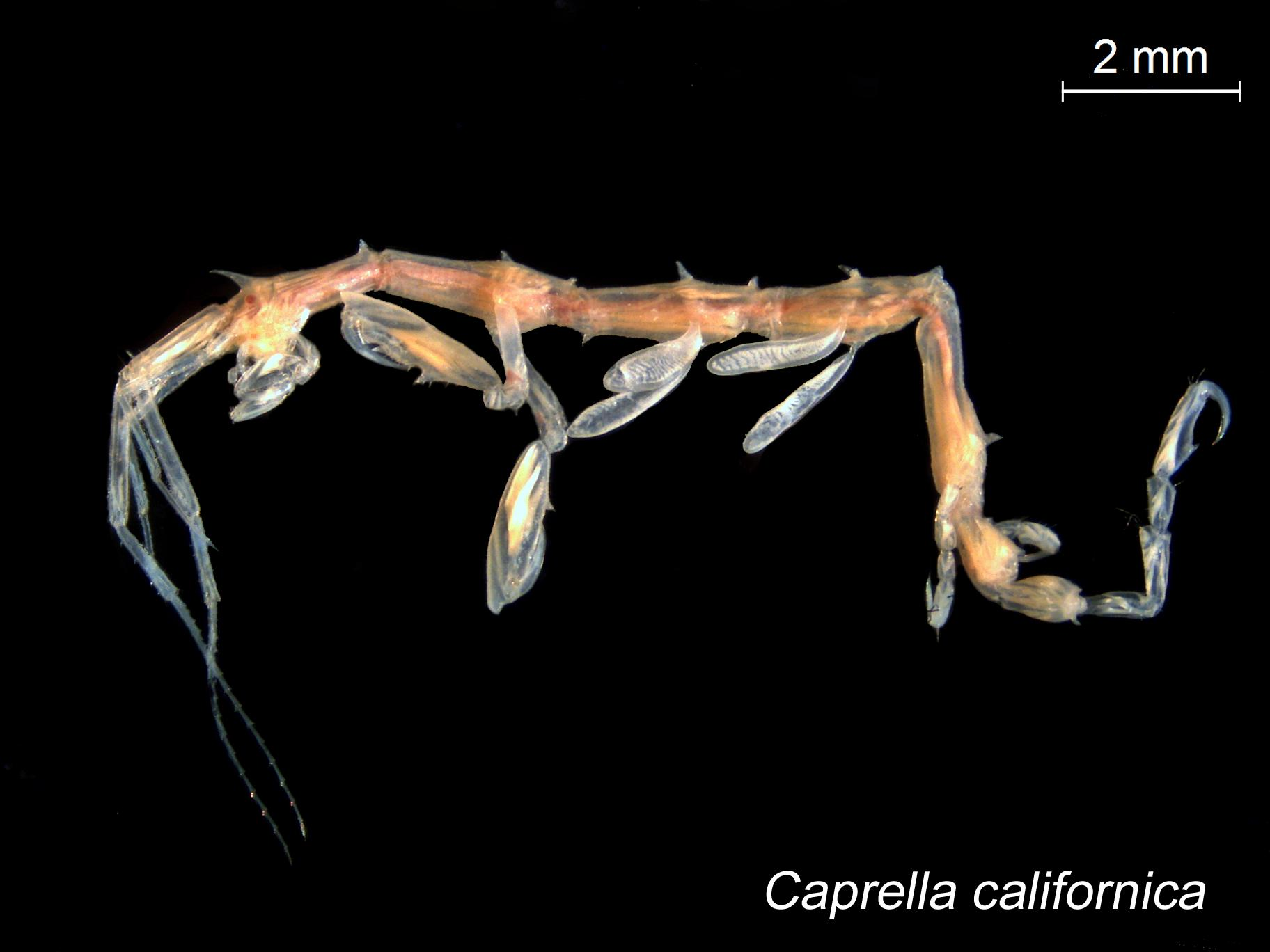

Scientific classification
- Domain: Eukaryota
- Kingdom: Animalia
- Phylum: Arthropoda
- Class: Malacostraca
- Order: Amphipoda
- Family: Caprellidae
- Genus: Caprella
- Species: C. californica

Binomial name
- Caprella californica Stimpson, 1857

= Caprella californica =

Species of crustacean

Caprella californica is a species of amphipod in the family Caprellidae. It is found in temperate Asia.
