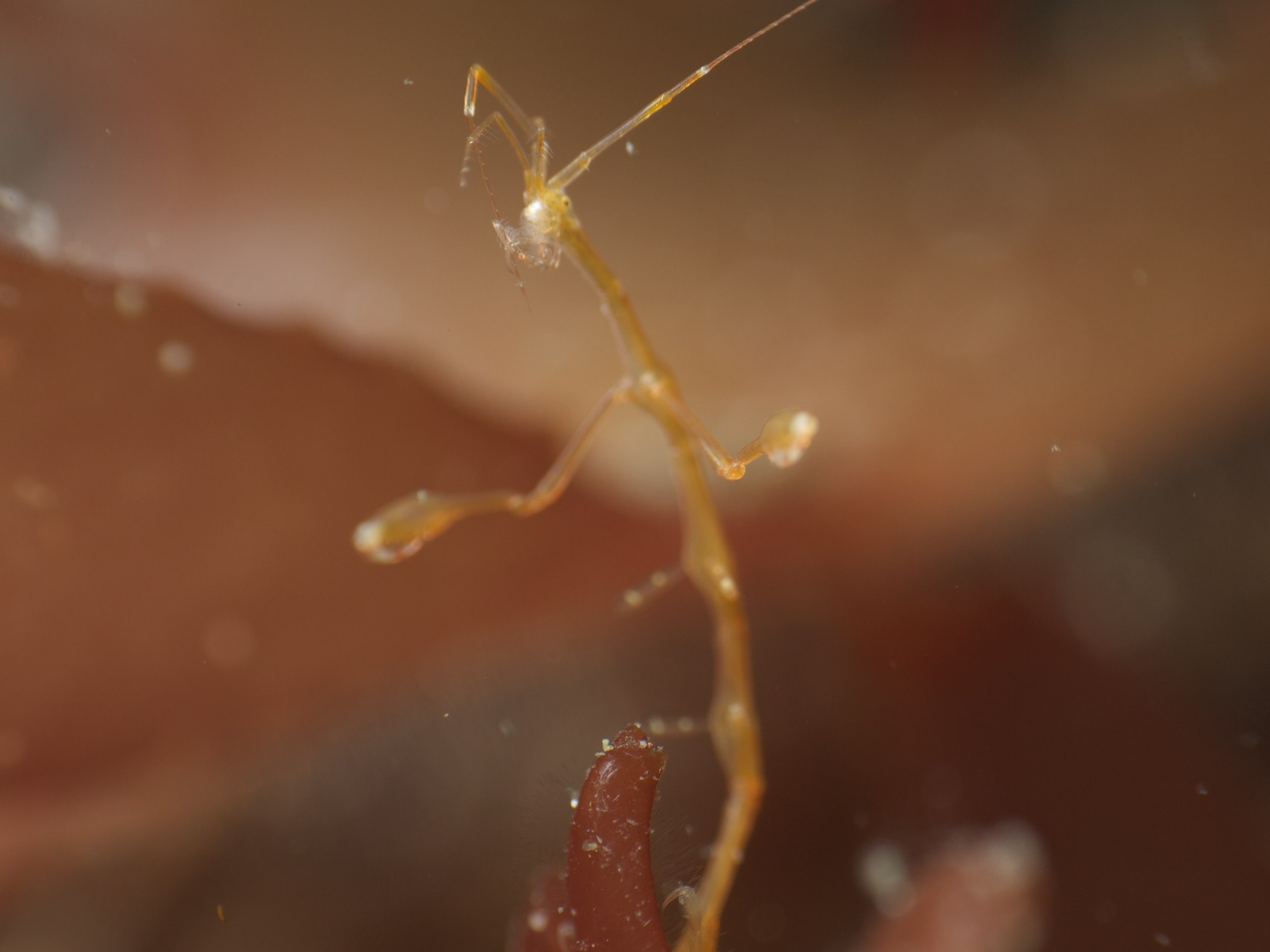

Scientific classification
- Domain: Eukaryota
- Kingdom: Animalia
- Phylum: Arthropoda
- Class: Malacostraca
- Order: Amphipoda
- Family: Caprellidae
- Genus: Caprella
- Species: C. kominatoensis

Binomial name
- Caprella kominatoensis Takeuchi, 1986

= Caprella kominatoensis =

Species of crustacean

Caprella kominatoensis is a species of skeleton shrimp in the genus Caprella. It was described in 1986 by Ichiro Takeuchi for specimens from Amatsu-Kominato (now part of Kamogawa), Chiba Prefecture, Japan, and is closely related to C. decipiens.
