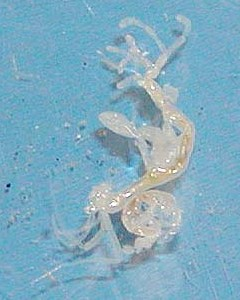

Scientific classification
- Domain: Eukaryota
- Kingdom: Animalia
- Phylum: Arthropoda
- Class: Malacostraca
- Order: Amphipoda
- Family: Caprellidae
- Genus: Caprella
- Species: C. bathytatos

Binomial name
- Caprella bathytatos Martin & Pettit, 1998

= Caprella bathytatos =

Species of crustacean

Caprella bathytatos is a species of skeleton shrimp in the genus Caprella. It was described in 1998 by Joel W. Martin and Gary Pettit, who discovered it living on the mouthparts of the crab Macroregonia macrochira near hydrothermal vents in British Columbia.
