= Caprella verrucosa =

Scientific classification
- Domain: Eukaryota
- Kingdom: Animalia
- Phylum: Arthropoda
- Class: Malacostraca
- Order: Amphipoda
- Family: Caprellidae
- Genus: Caprella
- Species: C. verrucosa

Binomial name
- Caprella verrucosa Boeck, 1872

Species of crustacean

Caprella verrucosa is a species of amphipod in the family Caprellidae. It is found in temperate Asia.
