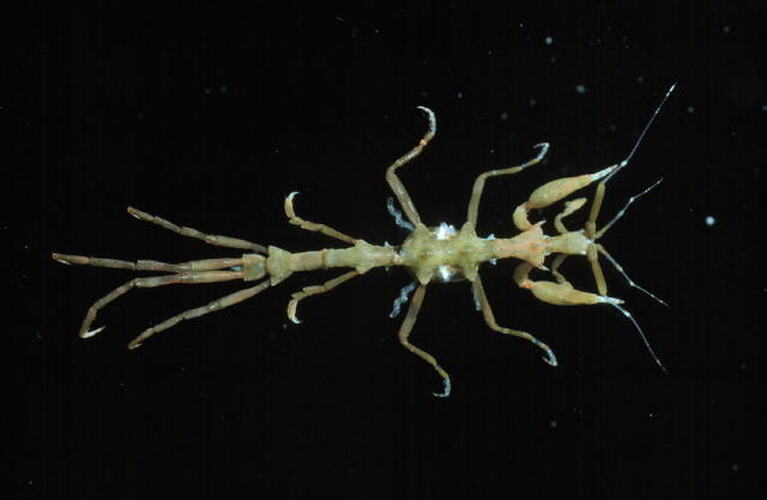
- Paraproto spinosa

Scientific classification
- Domain: Eukaryota
- Kingdom: Animalia
- Phylum: Arthropoda
- Class: Malacostraca
- Order: Amphipoda
- Family: Caprellidae
- Genus: Paraproto; Mayer, 1903

Type species
- Paraproto condylata Haswell, 1885

= Paraproto =

Genus of amphipods

Paraproto is a genus of marine amphipods in the family, Caprellidae, and was first described in 1903 by Paul Mayer. The type species is Paraproto condylata.

Species of this genus are found at depths of about 200 m in waters off New South Wales, South Australia, Tasmania, Victoria, and Antarctica.

== Species ==
Species listed as accepted by IRMNG:

- Paraproto condylata (Haswell, 1885)
- Paraproto gabrieli Stebbing, 1914
- Paraproto spinosa (Haswell, 1885)
- Paraproto tasmaniensis Guerra-García & Takeuchi, 2004
