= Caprellinoides elegans =

Scientific classification
- Kingdom: Animalia
- Phylum: Arthropoda
- Clade: Pancrustacea
- Class: Malacostraca
- Order: Amphipoda
- Family: Caprellidae
- Genus: Caprellinoides
- Species: C. elegans

Binomial name
- Caprellinoides elegans K.H. Barnard, 1932

Species of crustacean

Caprellinoides elegans is a species of amphipods (crustaceans commonly known as skeleton shrimps) in the family Caprellidae.
