= Caprella acanthogaster =

Scientific classification
- Domain: Eukaryota
- Kingdom: Animalia
- Phylum: Arthropoda
- Class: Malacostraca
- Order: Amphipoda
- Family: Caprellidae
- Genus: Caprella
- Species: C. acanthogaster

Binomial name
- Caprella acanthogaster Mayer, 1890

Species of crustacean

Caprella acanthogaster is a species of skeleton shrimp in the genus Caprella. It is native to northeast Asia. It closely resembles Caprella mutica but can be distinguished by its smooth first and second pereonites, as well as its linear-shaped gills.
