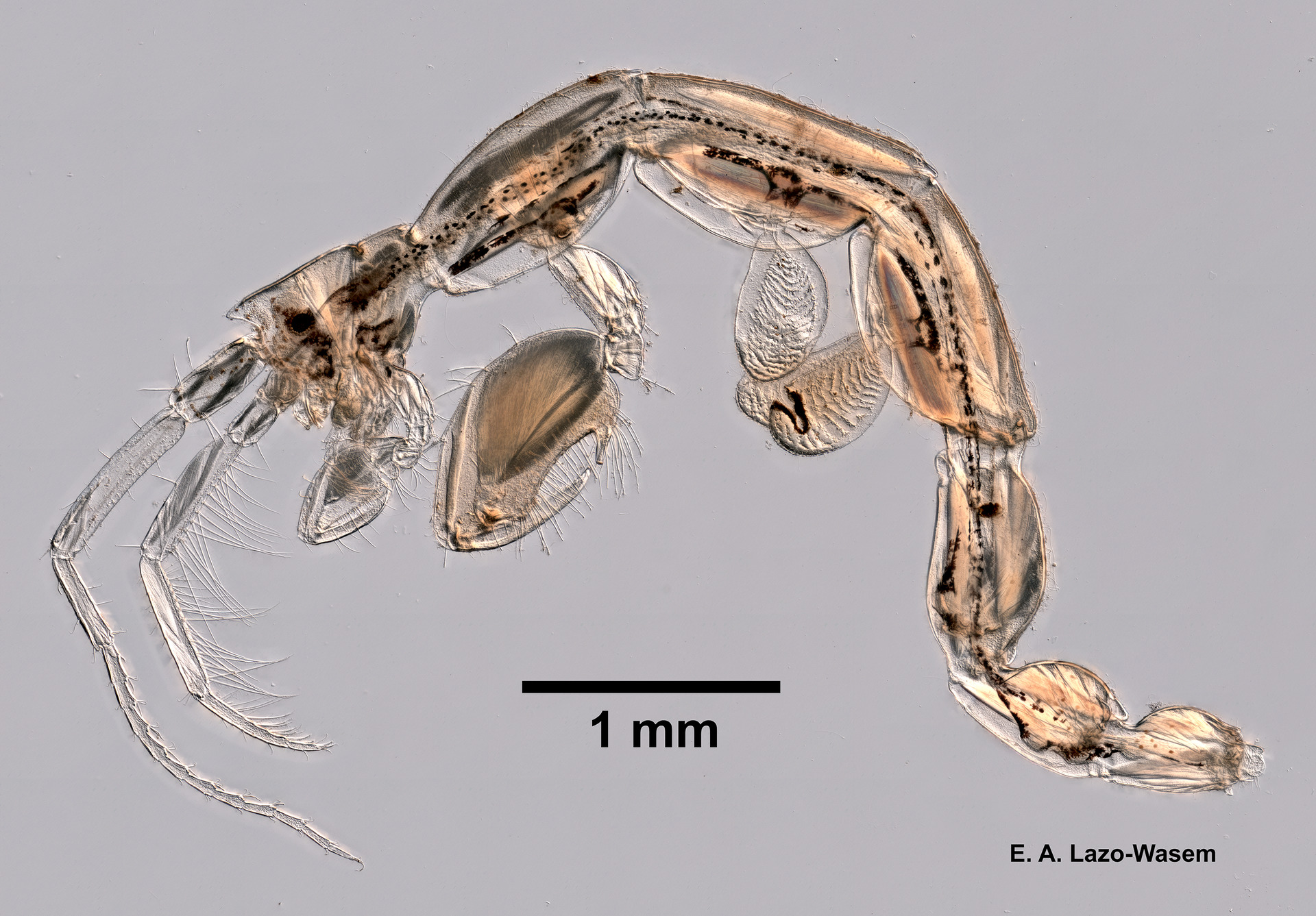

Scientific classification
- Kingdom: Animalia
- Phylum: Arthropoda
- Clade: Pancrustacea
- Class: Malacostraca
- Order: Amphipoda
- Family: Caprellidae
- Genus: Caprella
- Species: C. penantis

Binomial name
- Caprella penantis Leach, 1814

Synonyms
- Caprella acutifrons Latreille, 1816

= Caprella penantis =

Species of crustacean

Caprella penantis is a species of skeleton shrimp in the family Caprellidae. It lives on the seabed in shallow water in many parts of the world. This species was first described in 1814 by the English zoologist William Elford Leach who named it Caprella penantis in honour of the Welsh naturalist Thomas Pennant. The type locality is Devon, England.

== Description ==
Like other caprellid skeleton shrimps, Caprella penantis has a cylindrical, slender body with much reduced abdominal segments. It grows to a length of about 13 mm (0.5 in). The gnathopods (feeding appendages) are hooked and the three pairs of pereiopods (walking legs) are modified for clinging on to the plants and other organisms amongst which it lives. Compared to other caprellids in similar habitats, it has a small, sharply-pointed rostrum on its head and a relatively robust body. While generally drab in colour, this skeleton shrimp may take on some of the coloration of whatever it is feeding on.

== Distribution ==
Caprella penantis has a cosmopolitan distribution, being present in tropical, subtropical and temperate seas worldwide. It lives on the seabed among sea grasses and seaweeds, and is often associated with the sea whip Leptogorgia virgulata in beds of turtlegrass.

== Ecology ==
The sexes are separate in this species. Breeding takes place throughout the year; the male grasps the female with his hindmost pereiopod, and defends her from other males. The female produces several batches of about twenty eggs during her reproductive lifespan. The eggs are laid directly into a marsupium (brood pouch) under the female's body; the larvae do not have a planktonic phase but develop directly into juveniles which disperse by crawling away.
