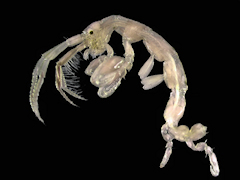

Scientific classification
- Kingdom: Animalia
- Phylum: Arthropoda
- Clade: Pancrustacea
- Class: Malacostraca
- Order: Amphipoda
- Family: Caprellidae
- Genus: Caprella
- Species: C. equilibra

Binomial name
- Caprella equilibra Say, 1818

Synonyms
- Caprella aequilibra (Say, 1818); Caprella esmarckii Boeck, 1861; Caprella laticornis (Boeck)

= Caprella equilibra =

Species of crustacean

Caprella equilibra is a species of skeleton shrimp in the family Caprellidae. It lives among other organisms on the seabed and occurs in both shallow and deep water in many parts of the world.

== Description ==
The skeleton prawn is not closely related to other amphipods. A cephalothorax results from the head's partial fusion with the first and second thoracic segments. The body is slender, cylindrical, elongate and unflattened. The first and second thoracic segments bear maxillipeds and gnathopods (feeding appendages) respectively, the third bears gnathopods, and the sixth, seventh and eighth bear well-developed periopods (walking legs). The remaining thoracic segments and the small abdominal segments bear vestigial appendages. The tips of some of the appendages have grasping hooks to cling onto the substrate. The male Caprella equilibra is about 22 mm (0.9 in) long while the female is about half that size.

== Distribution and habitat ==
C. equilibra has a cosmopolitan distribution. The type locality is the United States, where it is present on both coasts, and the range includes Argentina, Australia, Japan, Madagascar, Malaysia, New Zealand, the Philippines, South Africa, West Africa, Western Europe and Venezuela. Its depth range is from the surface down to about 3,000 m (10,000 ft). Its typical habitats include living concealed among seagrasses, sponges, green and red algae, hydroids, octocorals, bryozoans and colonial tunicates.

== Ecology ==
This species lives on the seabed, moving much like a looping caterpillar: gripping with its front limbs, bending its body and drawing in its rear limbs, then releasing its front limbs and extending its body. It is mainly a detritivore but has a more varied diet than some other caprellids, ingesting some of the hydroids to which it clings and even feeding on the plankton collected by the polyps.
