= Heterocaprella krishnaensis =

Scientific classification
- Domain: Eukaryota
- Kingdom: Animalia
- Phylum: Arthropoda
- Class: Malacostraca
- Order: Amphipoda
- Family: Caprellidae
- Genus: Heterocaprella
- Species: H. krishnaensis

Binomial name
- Heterocaprella krishnaensis Swarupa & Radhakrishna, 1983

Species of crustacean

Heterocaprella krishnaensis is a species of crustacean from the Caprellidae family. The scientific name of this species was first published in 1983 by Swarupa & Radhakrishna.
