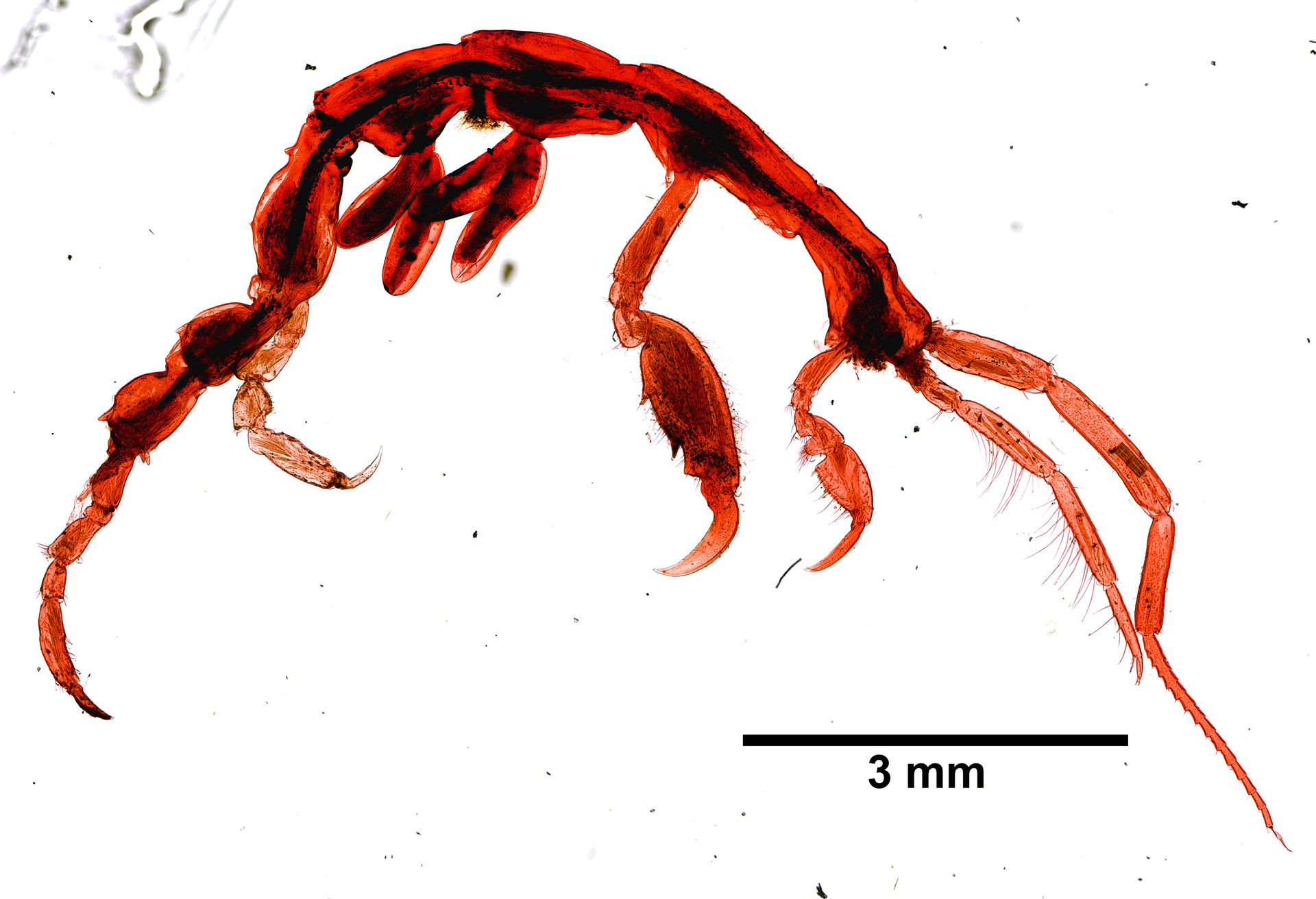

Scientific classification
- Kingdom: Animalia
- Phylum: Arthropoda
- Clade: Pancrustacea
- Class: Malacostraca
- Order: Amphipoda
- Family: Caprellidae
- Genus: Caprella
- Species: C. unica

Binomial name
- Caprella unica Mayer, 1903

= Caprella unica =

Species of crustacean

Caprella unica is a species of skeleton shrimp in the genus Caprella within the family Caprellidae. The larvae are plankton-like. They are relatively small, with two large and two small antennae. They only live in the sea (salt water), and are widely found in Cape Cod, Maine and Newfoundland.

The species was discovered during the Siboga expedition to the northern Pacific. It can be around 5–18 mm long. It lives as a parasite on starfish.

== Taxonomic placement ==
The species placement has recently been described and updated in 2003. The species' modern affiliation in the genus of Caprella is given in the light of the 2013 revision based on the WoRMS database.
