= Heterocaprella =

Scientific classification
- Domain: Eukaryota
- Kingdom: Animalia
- Phylum: Arthropoda
- Class: Malacostraca
- Order: Amphipoda
- Family: Caprellidae
- Subfamily: Caprellinae
- Genus: Heterocaprella; Arimoto, 1976

Species
- Heterocaprella clavigera Arimoto, 1976; Heterocaprella krishnaensis Swarupa & Radhakrishna, 1983

Genus of crustacean

Heterocaprella is a genus of crustaceans from the Caprellidae family. The scientific name of this genus was first published in 1976 by Arimoto.
