= Caprella tuberculata =

Scientific classification
- Domain: Eukaryota
- Kingdom: Animalia
- Phylum: Arthropoda
- Class: Malacostraca
- Order: Amphipoda
- Family: Caprellidae
- Genus: Caprella
- Species: C. tuberculata

Binomial name
- Caprella tuberculata Guérin, 1836

Species of crustacean

Caprella tuberculata is a species of skeleton shrimp in the genus Caprella. It is native to the North Sea.
