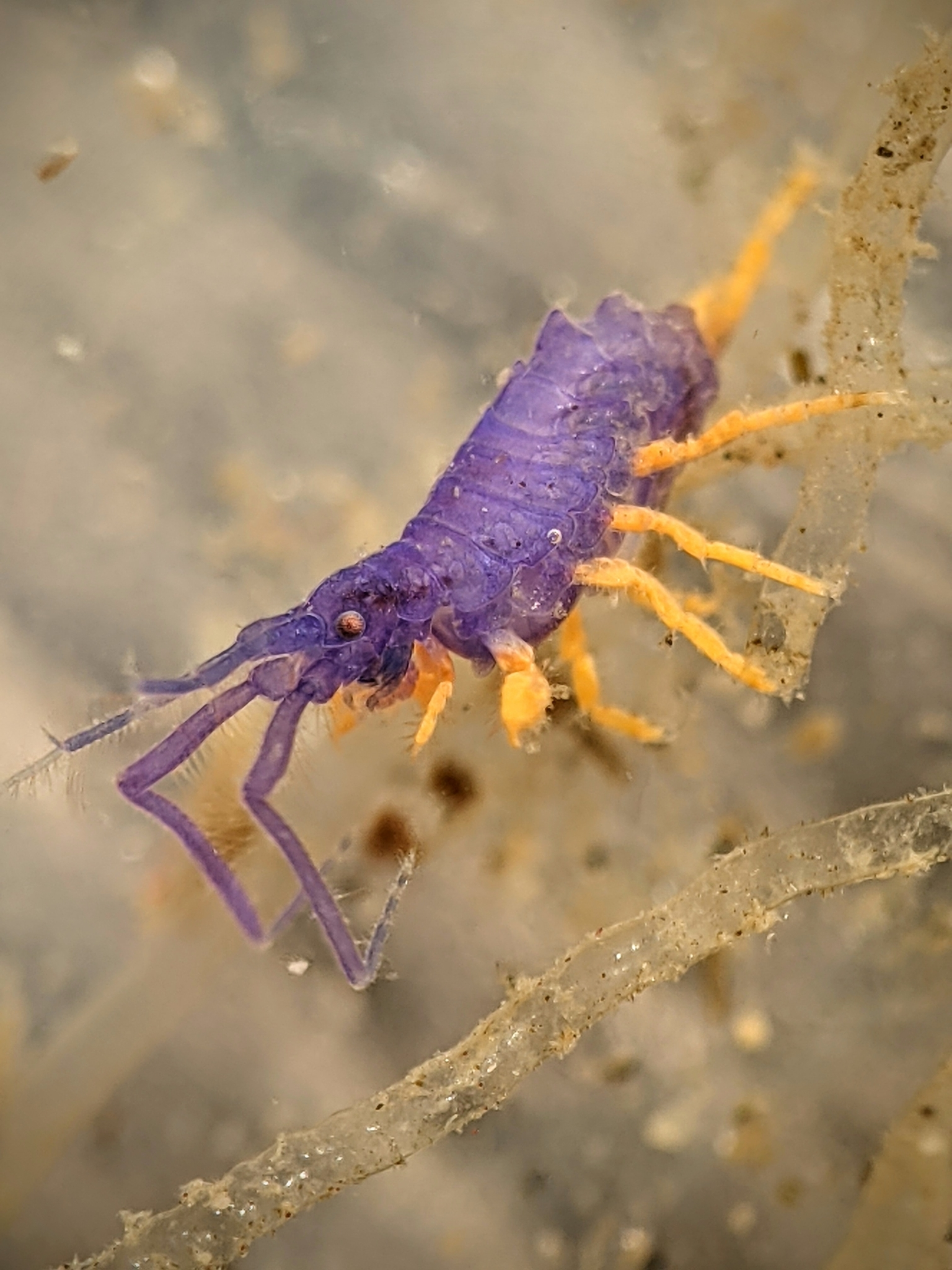
- Podocerus cristatus

Scientific classification
- Kingdom: Animalia
- Phylum: Arthropoda
- Clade: Pancrustacea
- Class: Malacostraca
- Order: Amphipoda
- Superfamily: Caprelloidea
- Family: Podoceridae; Leach, 1814

Genera
- See text.

= Podoceridae =

Family of crustaceans

Podoceridae is a family of amphipods. One species, Pocoderus cristatus, is known for mimicking the appearance of certain nudibranchs: Coryphella trilineata, Flabellinopsis iodinea, Flabellina bertschi, and Noumeaella rubrofasciata.

== Genera ==
Pocoderidae comprises eight genera:

- Cyrtophium Dana, 1852
- Laetmatophilus Bruzelius, 1859
- Leipsuropus Stebbing, 1899
- Neoxenodice Schellenberg, 1926
- Parunciola Chevreux, 1911
- Podobothrus Barnard & Clark, 1985
- Podocerus Leach, 1814
- Xenodice Boeck, 1871
