= Aeginina =

Scientific classification
- Kingdom: Animalia
- Phylum: Arthropoda
- Class: Malacostraca
- Order: Amphipoda
- Family: Caprellidae
- Genus: Aeginina; Norman, 1905

Genus of crustaceans

Aeginina is a genus of amphipods in the family Caprellidae. There are at least 2 described species in Aeginina.

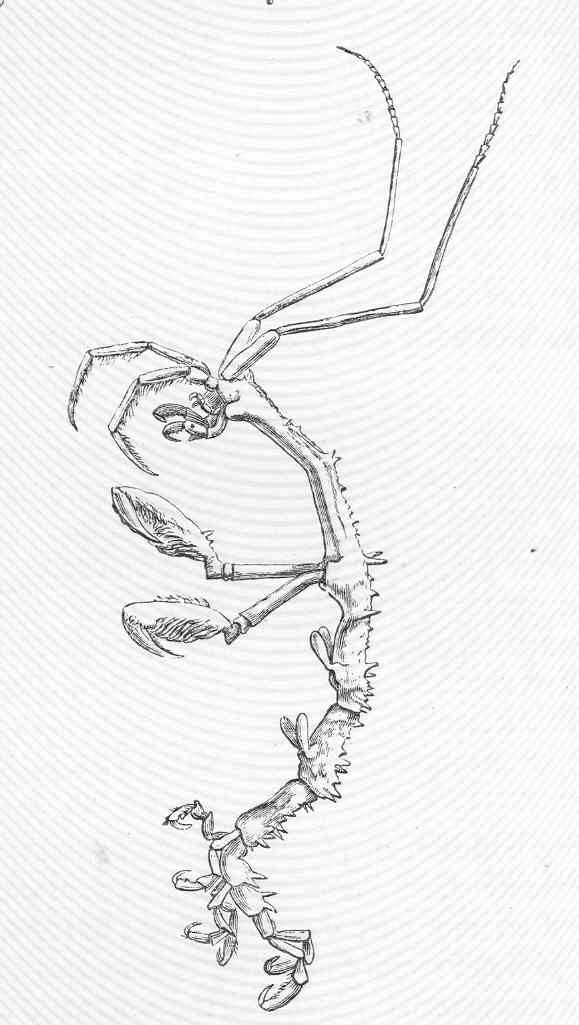
Illustration from Depths of the Sea

== Species ==
- Aeginina aenigmatica Laubitz, 1972
- Aeginina longicornis (Krøyer, 1842) (long-horned skeleton shrimp)
