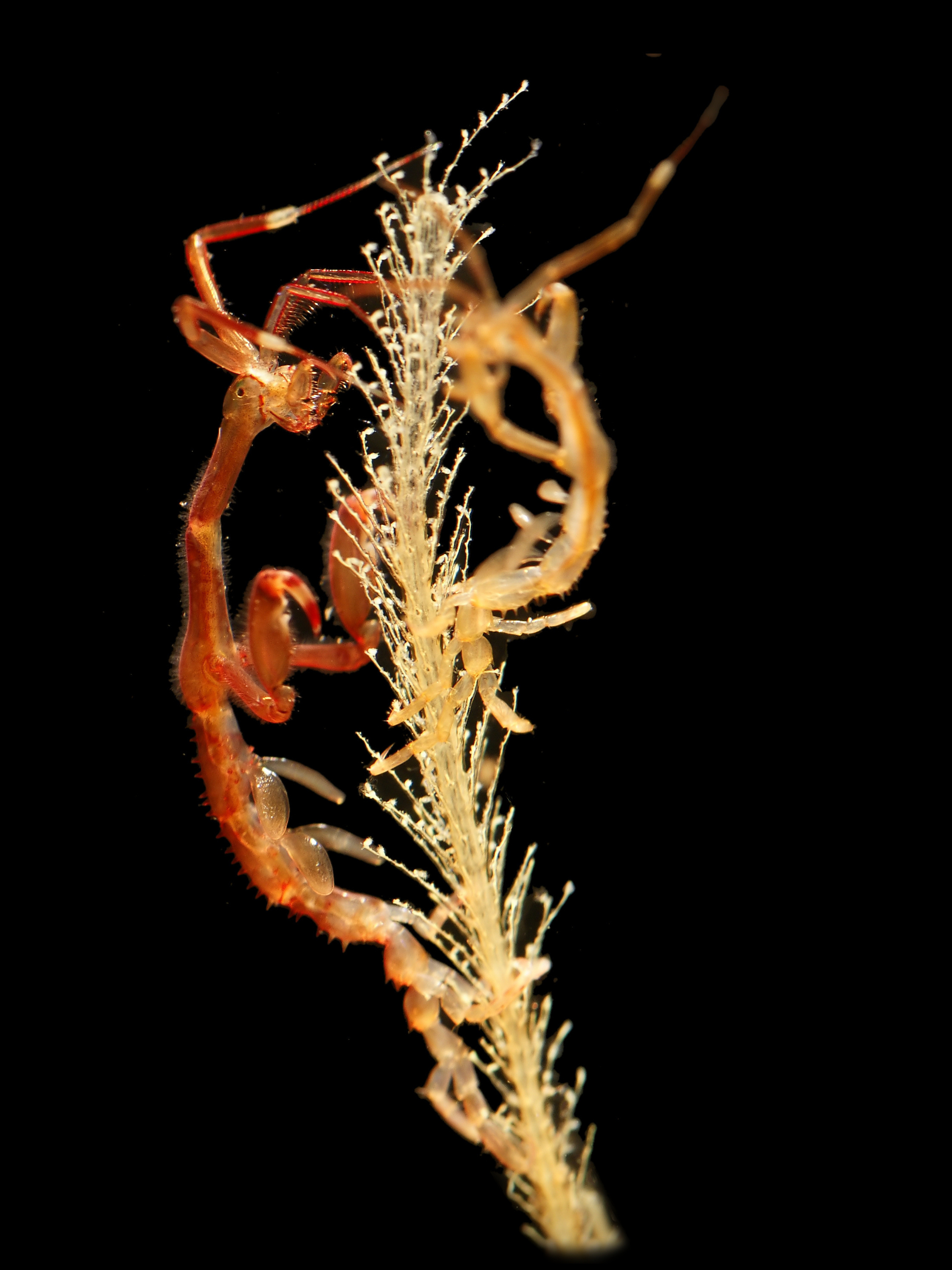
- Caprella mutica

Scientific classification
- Domain: Eukaryota
- Kingdom: Animalia
- Phylum: Arthropoda
- Class: Malacostraca
- Order: Amphipoda
- Family: Caprellidae
- Subfamily: Caprellinae
- Genus: Caprella; Lamarck, 1801

Type species
- Caprella linearis (Linnaeus, 1767)

Synonyms
- Liparis Bosc, 1801

= Caprella =

Genus of crustaceans

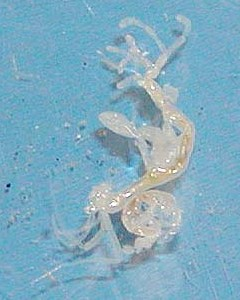
Caprella bathytatos

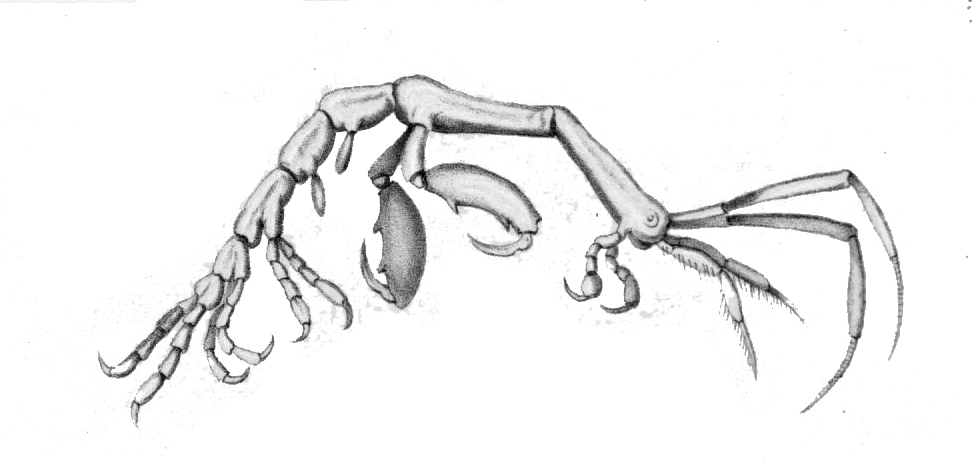
Caprella mendax

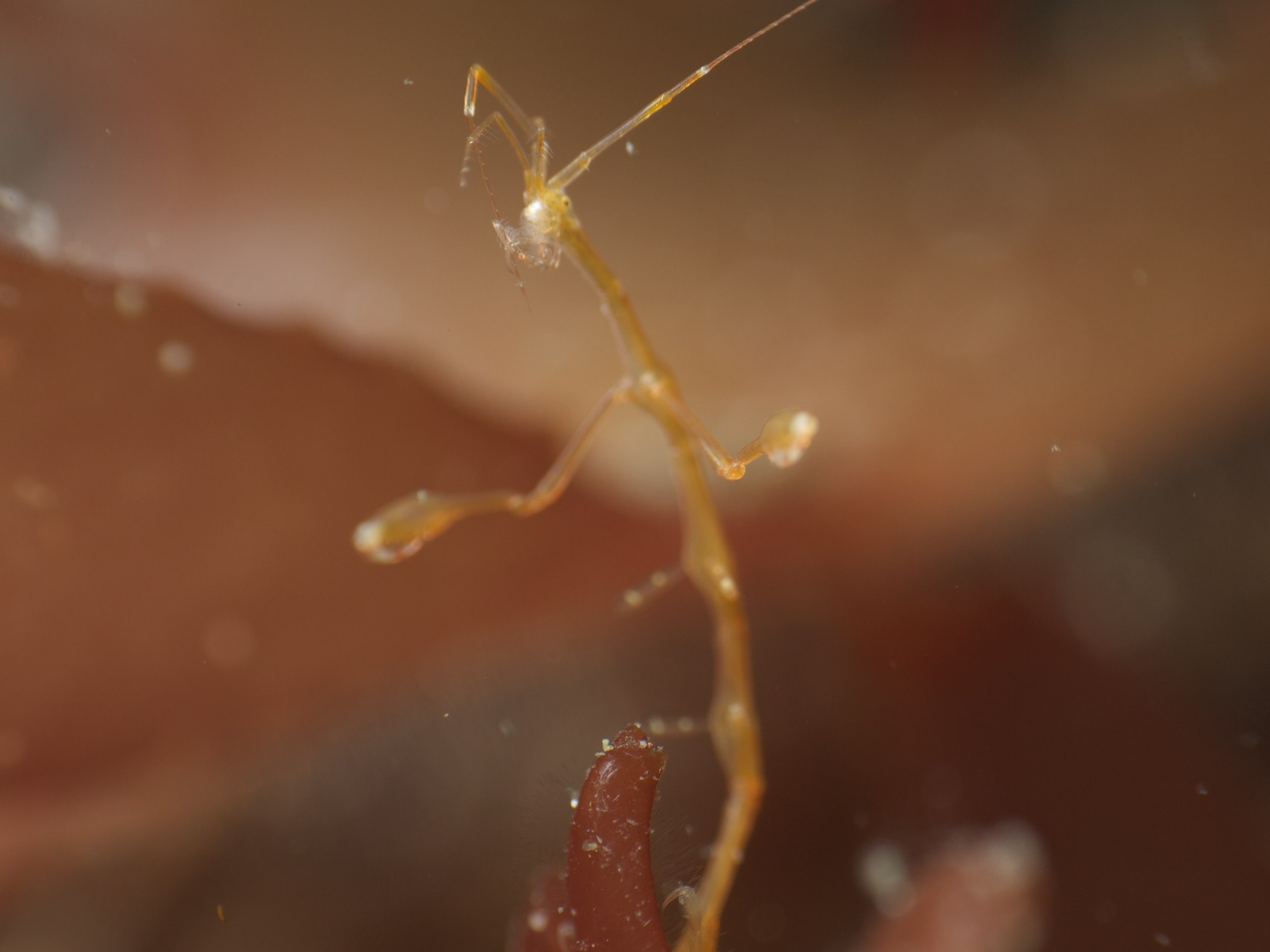
Caprella kominatoensis

Caprella is a large genus of skeleton shrimps belonging to the subfamily Caprellinae of the family Caprellidae. It includes approximately 170 species. The genus was first established by Jean-Baptiste Lamarck in his great work Système des animaux sans vertèbres (1801) to describe Cancer linearis (now Caprella linearis) and Squilla ventricosa (now Phtisica marina).

- Caprella acanthifera Leach, 1814
- Caprella acanthogaster Mayer, 1890
- Caprella acanthopoda Guiler, 1954
- Caprella advena Vassilenko, 1974
- Caprella aino Utinomi, 1943
- Caprella alaskana Mayer, 1903
- Caprella alaskensis Holmes, 1904
- Caprella algaceus Vassilenko, 1967
- Caprella andreae Mayer, 1890
- Caprella angulosa Mayer, 1903
- Caprella angusta Mayer, 1903
- Caprella arimotoi Takeuchi, 1993
- Caprella astericola Jankowski & Vassilenko, 1973
- Caprella bacillus Mayer, 1903
- Caprella bathyalis Vassilenko, 1972
- Caprella bathytatos Martin & Pettit, 1998
- Caprella bermudia Kundel, 1910
- Caprella bidentata Utinomi, 1947
- Caprella bispinosa Mayer, 1903
- Caprella borealis Mayer, 1903
- Caprella brachiata Arimoto, 1978
- Caprella branchella Arimoto, 1978
- Caprella brevirostris Mayer, 1903
- Caprella californica Stimpson, 1856
- Caprella carina Mayer, 1903
- Caprella carinata Arimoto, 1934
- Caprella caulerpensis Guerra-García et al., 2002
- Caprella cavediniae Krapp-Schickel & Vader, 1998
- Caprella centrota Vassilenko, 1972
- Caprella ceutae Guerra-García & Takeuchi, 2002
- Caprella chelimana Mayer, 1903
- Caprella ciliata Sars, 1883
- Caprella cilluroantennata Arimoto, 1934
- Caprella circur Mayer, 1903
- Caprella clavigera Vassilenko, 1972
- Caprella concinna Mateus & Mateus, 1991
- Caprella constantina Mayer, 1903
- Caprella corallina Arimoto, 1980
- Caprella corvina Mayer, 1903
- Caprella cristibrachium Mayer, 1903
- Caprella danilevskii Czerniavskii, 1868
- Caprella decipiens Mayer, 1890
- Caprella dilatata Krøyer, 1843
- Caprella dissona Arimoto, 1979
- Caprella drepanochir Mayer, 1890
- Caprella dubia Hansen, 1887
- Caprella edgari Guerra-García & Takeuchi, 2004
- Caprella equilibra Say, 1818
- Caprella equina Arimoto, 1978
- Caprella erethizon Mayer, 1901
- Caprella eurydactyla Vassilenko, 1974
- Caprella excelsa Vassilenko, 1974
- Caprella eximia Mayer, 1890
- Caprella extensimana Laubitz, 1995
- Caprella falsa Mayer, 1903
- Caprella ferrea Mayer, 1903
- Caprella fimbriata Vassilenko, 1994
- Caprella fretensis Stebbing, 1878
- Caprella generosa Arimoto, 1977
- Caprella gigantea Haller, 1880
- Caprella gigantochir Mayer, 1903
- Caprella glabra Aoki, 1991
- Caprella globiceps Dana, 1853
- Caprella gorgonia Laubitz & Lewbel, 1974
- Caprella gracilior Mayer, 1890
- Caprella gracilipes Grube, 1864
- Caprella gracillima Mayer, 1890
- Caprella grahami Wigley & Shave, 1966
- Caprella grandimana (Mayer, 1882)
- Caprella greenleyi McCain, 1969
- Caprella hirayamai Guerra-García & Takeuchi, 2003
- Caprella hirsuta Mayer, 1890
- Caprella imaii Utinomi, 1943
- Caprella incisa Mayer, 1903
- Caprella indeterminata Vassilenko, 1994
- Caprella inermis Grube, 1864
- Caprella iniqua Arimoto, 1980
- Caprella iniquilibra Mayer, 1903
- Caprella innocens Mayer, 1903
- Caprella insularis Laubitz, 1995
- Caprella irregularis Mayer, 1890
- Caprella japonica (Schurin, 1935)
- Caprella kincaidi Holmes, 1904
- Caprella kominatoensis Takeuchi, 1986
- Caprella kroyeri De Haan, 1849
- Caprella kuroshio Mori, 1999
- Caprella laevipes Mayer, 1903
- Caprella laeviuscula Mayer, 1903
- Caprella liliata Arimoto, 1979
- Caprella lilliput Krapp-Schickel & Ruffo, 1987
- Caprella linearis (Linnaeus, 1767)
- Caprella liparotensis Haller, 1879
- Caprella litoralis Vassilenko, 1972
- Caprella longicirrata Vassilenko, 1974
- Caprella longidentata Arimoto, 1934
- Caprella longimanus Stimpson, 1853
- Caprella luctator Stimpsom, 1855
- Caprella lukini Vassilenko, 1974
- Caprella madrasana Giles, 1890
- Caprella manneringi McCain, 1979
- Caprella mantis Latreille, 1816
- Caprella media Vassilenko, 1974
- Caprella mendax Mayer, 1903
- Caprella microtuberculata G.O. Sars, 1879
- Caprella minima Arimoto, 1980
- Caprella minuscula Arimoto, 1980
- Caprella mitis Mayer, 1890
- Caprella mixta Mayer, 1903
- Caprella modesta Herklots, 1861
- Caprella monai Guerra-García et al., 2001
- Caprella monoceros Mayer, 1890
- Caprella multituberculum Lee & Lee, 1996
- Caprella mutica Schurin, 1935
- Caprella nagaoi Arimoto, 1970
- Caprella natalensis Mayer, 1903
- Caprella nichtensis Brandt, 1851
- Caprella obtusifrons Utinomi, 1943
- Caprella okadai Arimoto, 1930
- Caprella oxyarthra Vassilenko, 1974
- Caprella pacifica Vassilenko, 1972
- Caprella palkii Giles, 1890
- Caprella paramitisGuerra-García et al., 2001
- Caprella parapaulina Vassilenko, 1974
- Caprella paulina Mayer, 1903
- Caprella penantis Leach, 1814
- Caprella pilidigitata Laubitz, 1970
- Caprella pilipalma Dougherty & Steinberg, 1953
- Caprella pinnigera Arimoto, 1980
- Caprella polyacantha Utinomi, 1947
- Caprella pseudorapax Guerra-García et al., 2001
- Caprella pustulata Laubitz, 1970
- Caprella rapax Mayer, 1890
- Caprella rhinoceros Mayer, 1903
- Caprella rhopalochir Mayer, 1903
- Caprella rinki Stephensen, 1916
- Caprella rotundidentata Vassilenko, 1972
- Caprella rudiscula Laubitz, 1970
- Caprella sabineae Guerra-García & García-Gómez, 2003
- Caprella sabulensis Guerra-García et al., 2001
- Caprella sanguinea Gould, 1841
- Caprella santosrosai Sanchez-Moyano et al., 1995
- Caprella sarsi Honeyman, 1889
- Caprella scabra Holmes, 1904
- Caprella scaura Templeton, 1836
- Caprella scitula Arimoto & Hirayama, 1979
- Caprella sedovi Gurjanova, 1933
- Caprella septentrionalis Krøyer, 1838
- Caprella simia Mayer, 1903
- Caprella simplex Mayer, 1890
- Caprella singularis Mayer, 1903
- Caprella soyo Arimoto, 1934
- Caprella stella Krapp-Schickel & Vader, 1998
- Caprella striata Mayer, 1903
- Caprella subinermis Mayer, 1890
- Caprella subtilis Mayer, 1903
- Caprella takeuchi Guerra-García et al., 2001
- Caprella tasmaniensis Guiler, 1954
- Caprella telarpax Mayer, 1890
- Caprella temperativa Arimoto, 1982
- Caprella tenella (Dana, 1853)
- Caprella tenuis Haswell, 1880
- Caprella traudlae Guerra-Garcia, 2004
- Caprella triodos Stebbing, 1910
- Caprella trispinisHoneyman, 1889
- Caprella tsugarensis Utinomi, 1947
- Caprella tuberculata Guérin, 1836
- Caprella ungulina Mayer, 1903
- Caprella unica Mayer, 1903
- Caprella uniforma La Follette, 1915
- Caprella vana Mayer, 1903
- Caprella venusta Utinomi, 1943
- Caprella verrucosa Boeck, 1871
- Caprella vidua Mayer, 1903
- Caprella vitjazi Vassilenko, 1992
- Caprella wirtzi Krapp-Schickel & Takeuchi, 2005
- Caprella zygodonta Vassilenko, 1974
