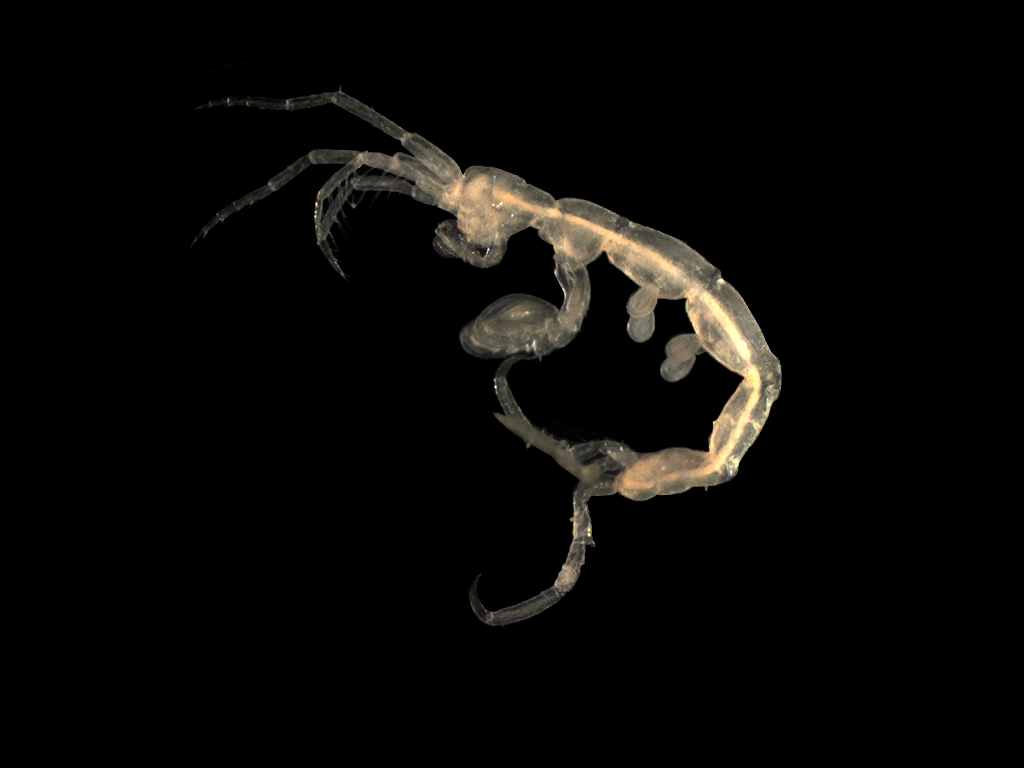
- Pariambus typicus

Scientific classification
- Domain: Eukaryota
- Kingdom: Animalia
- Phylum: Arthropoda
- Class: Malacostraca
- Order: Amphipoda
- Family: Caprellidae
- Subfamily: Caprellinae
- Genus: Pariambus; Stebbing, 1888

Species
- Pariambus minutus (Mayer, 1882); Pariambus typicus (Krøyer, 1884)

= Pariambus =

Genus of crustaceans

Pariambus is a genus of amphipod crustaceans comprising the two species Pariambus typicus and Pariambus minutus.
