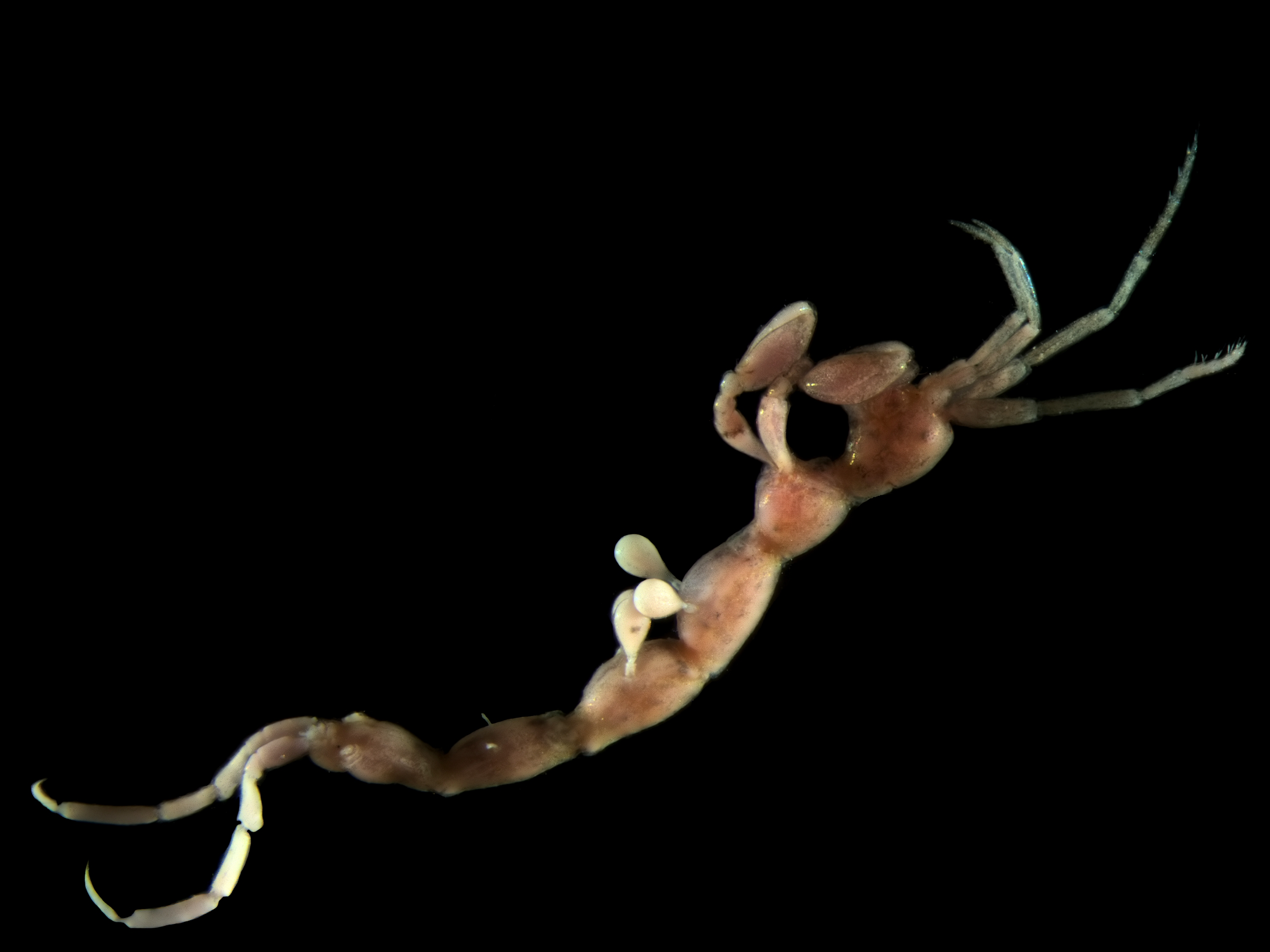
- Pariambus typicus (male)

Scientific classification
- Domain: Eukaryota
- Kingdom: Animalia
- Phylum: Arthropoda
- Class: Malacostraca
- Order: Amphipoda
- Suborder: Senticaudata
- Infraorder: Corophiida
- Parvorder: Caprellidira
- Superfamily: Caprelloidea; Leach, 1814

Families
- See text

Synonyms
- Caprellidea Leach, 1814

= Caprelloidea =

Superfamily of crustaceans

Caprelloidea is a superfamily of marine crustaceans in the order Amphipoda. It includes "untypical" forms of amphipods, such as the skeleton shrimps (Caprellidae) and whale lice (Cyamidae). The group was formerly treated as one of the four amphipod suborders, Caprellidea, but has been moved down to the superfamily rank by Myers & Lowry (2003, 2013) after phylogenetic studies of the group, and is now contained in the infraorder Corophiida of the suborder Senticaudata. The group includes the following families.

- Caprellidae Leach, 1814
- Caprogammaridae Kudrjaschov & Vassilenko, 1966
- Cyamidae Rafinesque, 1815
- Dulichiidae Laubitz, 1983
- Podoceridae Leach, 1814

== See also ==
- Caprellidira
