= Thorina =

Scientific classification
- Kingdom: Animalia
- Phylum: Arthropoda
- Class: Malacostraca
- Order: Amphipoda
- Family: Caprellidae
- Genus: Thorina; Stephensen, 1944

Species
- Thorina elongata Laubnitz & Mills, 1972; Thorina spinosa Stephensen, 1944

Genus of crustaceans

Thorina is a genus of amphipod crustaceans comprising the two species Thorina spinosa and Thorina elongata. They are deep-sea species, found at depths of 900 metres (3,000 ft) and 1,500–4,892 m (4,921–16,050 ft), respectively, in the North Atlantic Ocean and Arctic Ocean.
