= Dulichiidae =

Scientific classification
- Domain: Eukaryota
- Kingdom: Animalia
- Phylum: Arthropoda
- Class: Malacostraca
- Order: Amphipoda
- Superfamily: Caprelloidea
- Family: Dulichiidae

Family of crustaceans

Dulichiidae is a family of amphipods belonging to the parvorder Caprellidira. It includes the following genera:

- Dulichia Krøyer, 1845
- Dulichiopsis Laubitz, 1977
- Dyopedos Spence Bate, 1857
- Metadulichia Ariyama, 2019
- Paradulichia Boeck, 1871
- Paradyopedos Andres & Rauschert, 1990
- Pseudodulichia Rauschert, 1990
