= Caprellinoides =

Scientific classification
- Domain: Eukaryota
- Kingdom: Animalia
- Phylum: Arthropoda
- Class: Malacostraca
- Order: Amphipoda
- Family: Caprellidae
- Genus: Caprellinoides; Stebbing, 1888

Species
- Caprellinoides elegans K.H. Barnard, 1932; Caprellinoides mayeri Pfeffer, 1888; Caprellinoides singularis Guerra-García, 2001; Caprellinoides tristanensis Stebbing, 1888; Caprellinoides antarcticus Schellenberg, 1926 accepted as Caprellinoides tristanensis Stebbing, 1888; Caprellinoides spinosus K.H. Barnard, 1930 accepted as Caprellinoides mayeri Pfeffer, 1888

Genus of crustaceans

Caprellinoides is a genus of amphipods (commonly known as skeleton shrimps) in the family Caprellidae.
