= Stephanocystis crassipes =

Scientific classification
- Domain: Eukaryota
- Clade: Diaphoretickes
- Clade: SAR
- Clade: Stramenopiles
- Phylum: Gyrista
- Subphylum: Ochrophytina
- Class: Phaeophyceae
- Order: Fucales
- Family: Sargassaceae
- Genus: Stephanocystis
- Species: S. crassipes

Binomial name
- Stephanocystis crassipes (Mertens ex Turner) Draisma, Ballesteros, F.Rousseau & T.Thibaut, 2010

Synonyms
- Cystophyllum crasspies (Mertens ex Turner) J.Agardh, 1848; Cystoseira crassipes (Mertens ex Turner) C.Agardh, 1821; Fucus crassipes Mertens ex Turner, 1809

Species of seaweed

Stephanocystis crassipes is a species of seaweed native to northeast Asia.
