= Paul Mayer (zoologist) =

German marine biologist (Carcinology)

Paul Mayer (1848 in Lüdenscheid – 1923 in Jena) was a German zoologist.

He worked as an assistant at Stazione Zoologica in Naples. He studied several groups of marine animals, especially the Crustacea, in particular the Caprellidae. Mayer is especially known for his systematizing of histological techniques. He also wrote the treatise Zoomikrotechnik in 1920. He was a student of Ernst Haeckel.

== Works ==
Partial list

- 1882 Caprelliden. Fauna und Flora des Golfes von Neapel, 6, 1–201.
- 1890 Die Caprelliden des Golfes von Neapel und der angrenzenden Meeres-Abschnitte. Fauna und Flora des Golfes von Neapel, 17, 1–55.
- 1903 Die Caprelliden der Siboga-Expedition. Siboga Expeditie, 34, 1–160.
