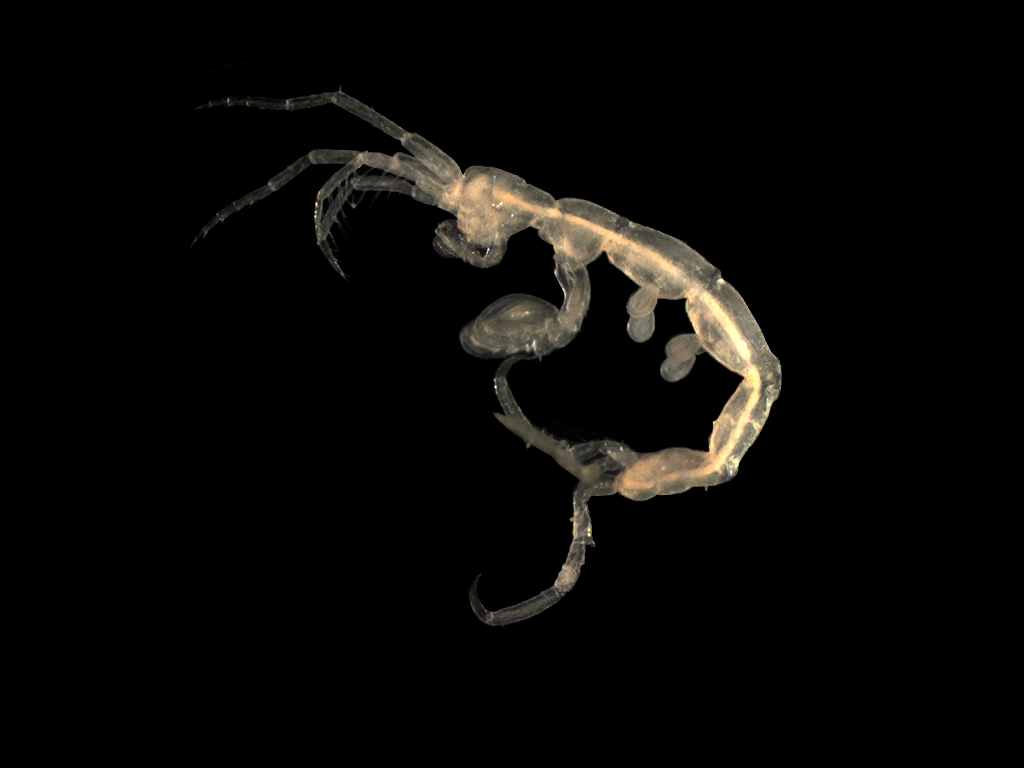

Scientific classification
- Domain: Eukaryota
- Kingdom: Animalia
- Phylum: Arthropoda
- Class: Malacostraca
- Order: Amphipoda
- Family: Caprellidae
- Genus: Pariambus
- Species: P. typicus

Binomial name
- Pariambus typicus Krøyer, 1844

= Pariambus typicus =

Species of crustacean

Pariambus typicus is a species of amphipod crustacean. It is found in the Atlantic Ocean from northern Norway south to the Cape Verde Islands and into the Mediterranean Sea as far east as Italy. It is absent from the Baltic Sea, suggesting that it requires water of high salinity. Adults grow to a length of 7 millimetres (0.28 in), and are commonly found in association with starfish and sea urchins, and more rarely with brittle stars. The species is sometimes included in the family Pariambidae, but more usually in the Caprellidae.
