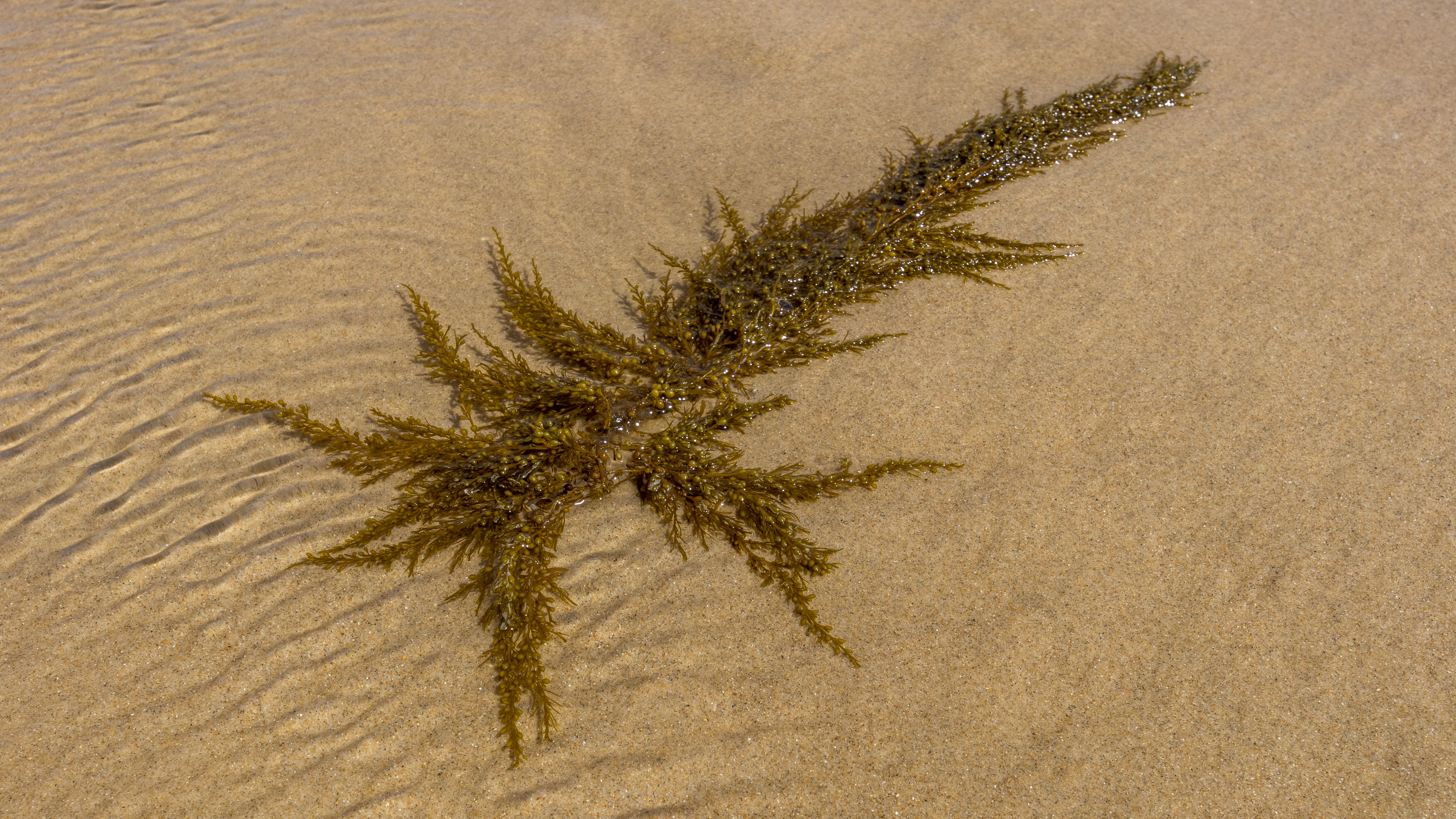

Scientific classification
- Domain: Eukaryota
- Clade: Sar
- Clade: Stramenopiles
- Division: Ochrophyta
- Class: Phaeophyceae
- Order: Fucales
- Family: Sargassaceae
- Genus: Sargassum
- Species: S. muticum

Binomial name
- Sargassum muticum (Yendo) Fensholt

= Sargassum muticum =

Species of seaweed

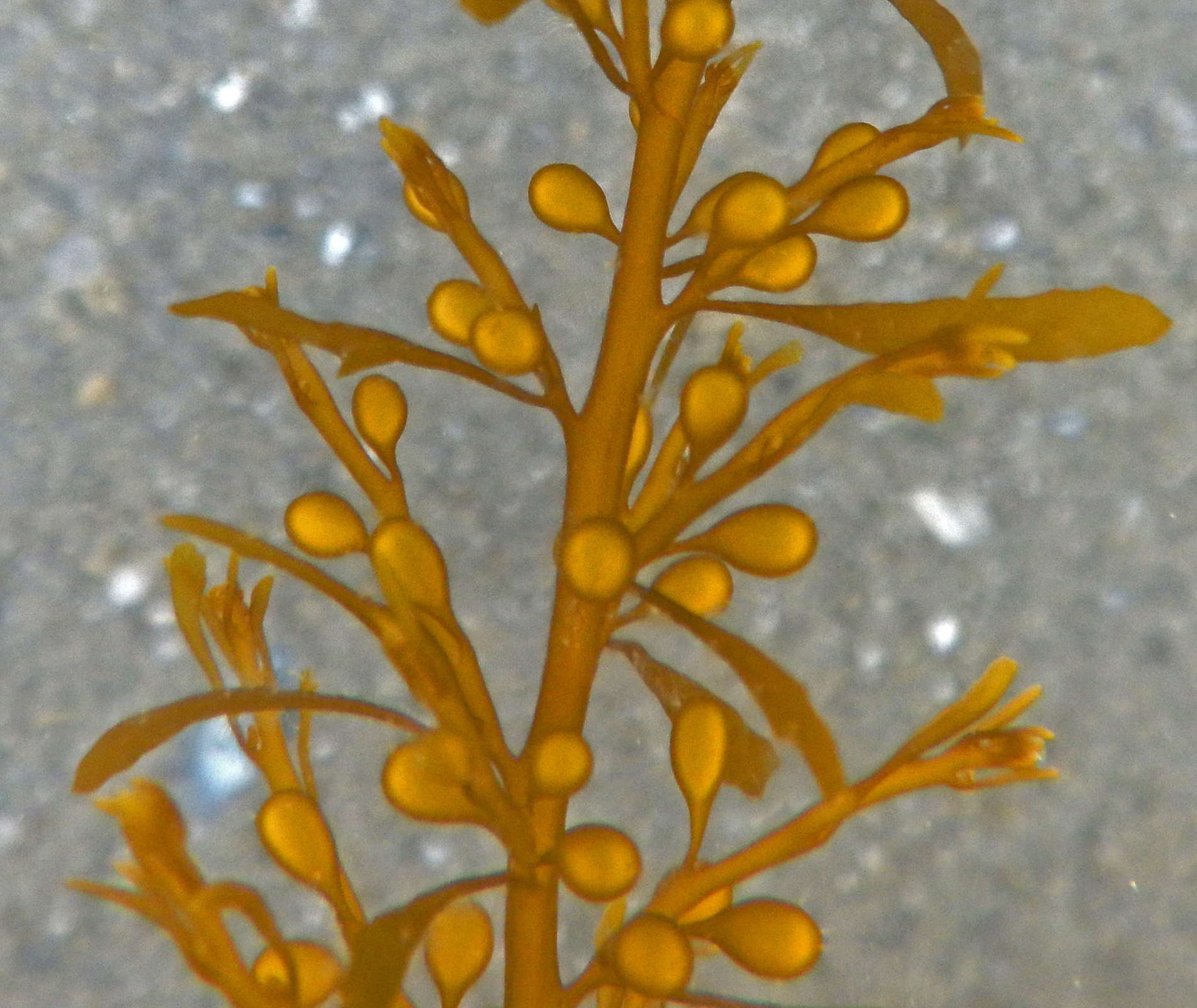
Detail of the fronds, showing gas-filled floats.

Sargassum muticum, commonly known as Japanese wireweed or japweed, is a large brown seaweed of the genus Sargassum. It is native to the Western Pacific Ocean from coasts of China, South Korea, Japan, and southern Russia. During the mid-1900s, S. muticum was introduced to the Eastern Pacific Ocean, Atlantic Ocean, and the Mediterranean Sea. In some non-native habitats, it is an invasive species due to its high growth rate and efficient dispersal.

== Description ==
Sargassum muticum is a brown seaweed, normally brown to yellowish with a length up to 10 m. It is an autotroph that uses energy from sunlight. The photosynthesis is facilitated thanks to aerial vesicles which allow the seaweed to rise to the water's surface.

Sargassum muticum is composed of two distinct parts: a perennial part, which contains the holdfast and one or more short main axes; and an annual part: the secondary axes, which develop on the main axis, whose growth is unlimited and whose size is variable. There are three types of ramifications: laterals with foliaceous expansions called fronds, laterals with fronds and aerocysts and laterals with fronds, aerocysts and reproductive organs called receptacles. In winter, only the perennial part persists (5 cm). In summer, the lateral part is in maximum development of 2–3 meters to 10 meters.

== Reproduction ==
The mode of reproduction is both sexual and asexual. S. muticum reaches sexual maturity in the summer when gamete production takes place in receptacles. The species is monoecious, i.e. an individual is capable of producing male and female gametes. Its cycle of development is monogenic (i.e. only one generation is present during its life cycle). At the level of fertilization: male gametes are dispersed in seawater while female gametes remain in the receptacle where fertilization takes place). Development is also done at the receptacle and then once at the stage of seedling, the latter is detached for fixation on a new support and form a new individual. This species can also reproduce asexually, but this has never been observed in temperate environments.

== Habitat ==
Sargassum muticum grows from half-tide to infralittoral areas (to a depth of 10 m). It is fixed on solid substrates like rocks, stones, shells. It is highly tolerant towards temperature and salinity variations. The optimal temperature is between 17 and 20 °C but it tolerates 0 and 30 °C.

== Global spread, invasiveness, impacts ==
=== Global spread ===
Originally from Japan, it is thought to have gained worldwide distribution through being transported with Japanese oysters (Crassostrea gigas). Sargassum muticum was introduced to the Californian coast in the 1940s and in Europe in the 1970s (The species was first found in the British Isles in the Isle of Wight in 1973). Currently, the alga is widespread from Norway to Portugal along Atlantic coasts. Sargassum muticum has a range stretching from Campbell River, British Columbia to Baja in California. In Europe it extends along the coasts of Great Britain, France, Scandinavia, Baltic Sea, Helgoland, Netherlands, Ireland, the Iberian Peninsula and into the Mediterranean from Italy and the Adriatic. It is recorded from Japan, China and Alaska. Recently, some specimens were found on Moroccan coasts. This illustrates its huge tolerance regarding its environment. Herbarium specimens are now stored in the Ulster Museum (BEL catalogue numbers: F11241 - F11242; F11182 - F11185).

=== Invasiveness and impacts ===
S. muticum is not invasive in all regions it has spread to. In many areas, populations of S. muticum grew more aggressively early in its introduction, but shifted to an established species that is integrated with the local ecosystem. However, in areas where it has been more recently introduced, such as Ireland (introduced in 1995), it grows in large mats and can cause ecological and economic problems.

In some introduced locations, S. muticum has caused a decrease in native algal species. Because of its large size and dense fronds, S. muticum forms a screen within the water column preventing the penetration of light to other seaweeds and algae growing below it. It can also captures the nutrients in disfavor of other species, including phytoplankton. However, there are studies that report S. muticum also serves as shelter and protection for fish larvae and crustaceans.

Overproliferation of S. muticum can also have negative economic impacts. It fixes itself to the shells of oysters, creating problems in shellfish farming through increased manual work to eliminate the algae. In addition, it can wrap around the farming structures or get entangled with the propellers of boats, requiring additional maintenance. Like other Sargassum blooms, large mats can detach and wash ashore, where it rots and decreases beach use by people.

=== Options for removal ===
There are multiple options to remove S. muticum from areas it has invaded. Mechanical removal—physically removing S. muticum from surfaces it is growing on—can promote spread of the gametes and seedlings and is labor-intensive if done by hand or cost prohibitive by machine. Removal experiments show varying levels of success, from little to moderate impact, in restoring past habitat by removal of S. muticum. One study using mechanical, chemical removal (herbicides), and biological removal (release of predators) concluded all options were ineffective.

== Uses ==
There are some potential uses for Sargassum muticum.

In agriculture, algae are used as sources of nitrate and potash for fertilization. It is also used in aquaculture as feed for juvenile sea cucumbers.

=== Water treatment ===
the cell walls of S. muticum contain alginates and fucoidans. The association of both molecules forms a bigger molecule and this one can be a flocculant. This process can be a method to catch organic matter present in sewage. This flocculant, rich in proteins and oligoelements, is easily biodegradable and could be used for fertilizer.

Previous studies have shown that Sargassum muticum is able to carry out the biosorption of heavy metals like cadmium, chlorophenolic compounds, and nickel.

=== Antifouling ===
Secondary metabolites produced by marine algae could be an interesting alternative antifouling agent. Previous studies have shown the potential of hydrocarbon and fatty acid compounds in antifouling activities, compounds such as galactolipids and palmitic acid, 1-tetradecene or 1-hexadecene. Moreover, the peak production of antifouling compounds is during the spring.

=== Source of pharmaceutical compounds ===
Antioxidant compounds: Sargassum muticum is rich in antioxidant compounds such as phenolic compounds (cathechins, phlorotannins, quercetins), pigments (fucoxanthin) and vitamins(vitamin C, K, E in the form of alpha-tocophérol and gamma-tocopherol). Applications are possible in pharmaceuticals, cosmetics and health fields, thanks to the antioxidant activities of these molecules.
