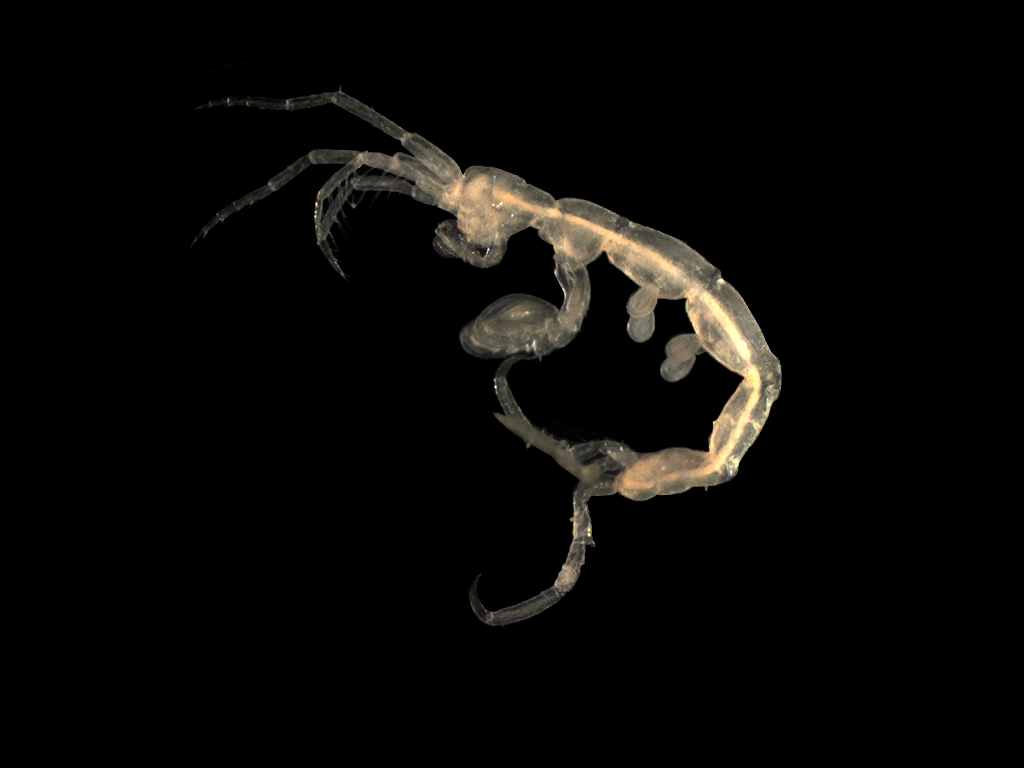
- Pariambus typicus

Scientific classification
- Kingdom: Animalia
- Phylum: Arthropoda
- Clade: Pancrustacea
- Class: Malacostraca
- Order: Amphipoda
- Suborder: Senticaudata
- Infraorder: Corophiida
- Parvorder: Caprellidira
- Superfamily: Caprelloidea
- Family: Caprellidae; Leach, 1814

Synonyms
- Aeginellidae Leach, 1814; Phtisicidae Vassilenko, 1968; Phtisicoidea Vassilenko, 1968; Protellidae McCain, 1970; Pariambidae Laubitz, 1993

= Caprellidae =

Family of crustaceans

Caprellidae is a family of amphipods commonly known as skeleton shrimps. Their common name denotes the threadlike slender body which allows them to virtually disappear among the fine filaments of seaweed, hydroids and bryozoans. They are sometimes also known as ghost shrimps.

== Description ==
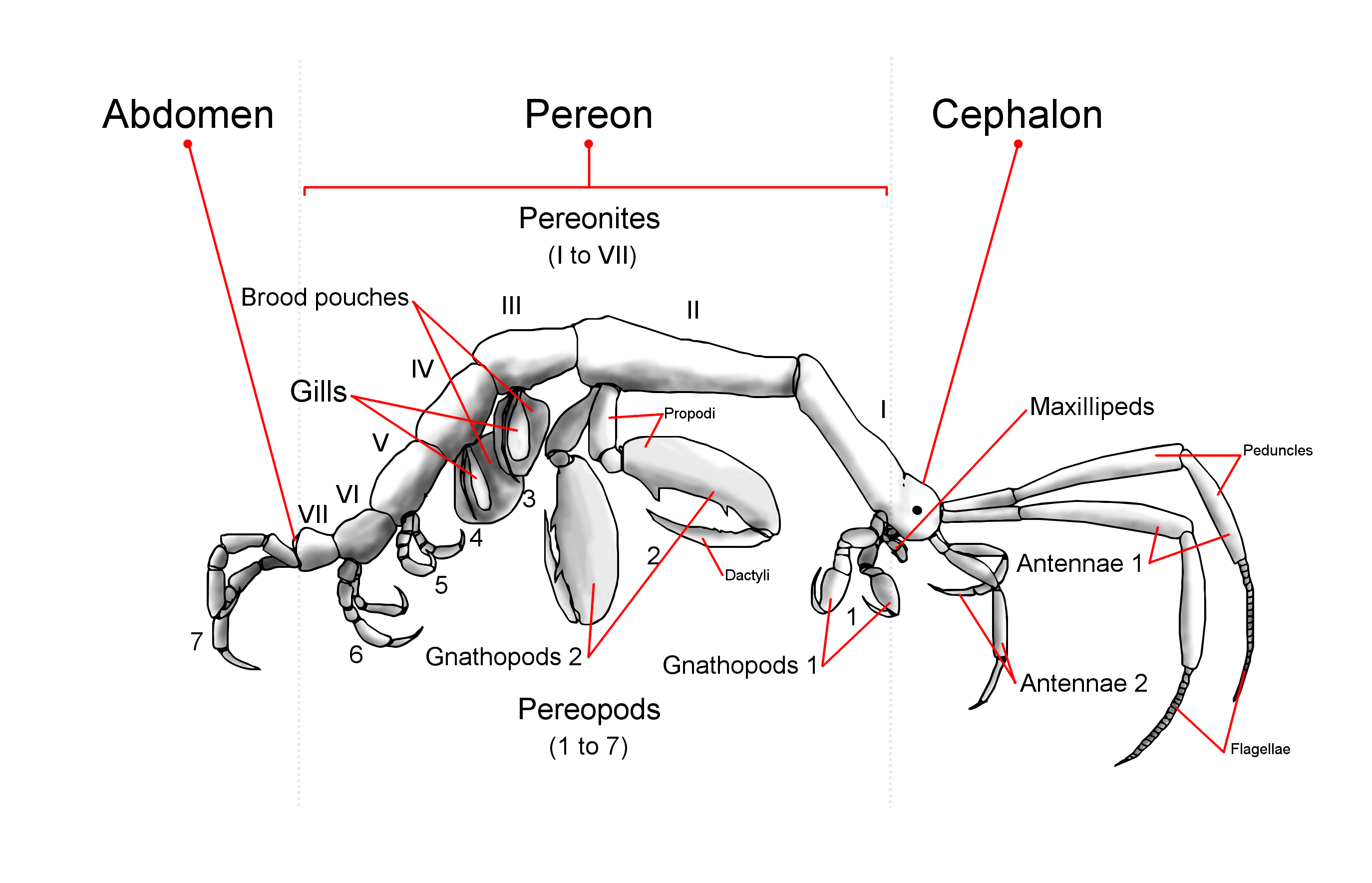
Anatomy of a generalised caprellid (female)

Caprellids are easily distinguishable from other amphipods because of their slender elongated bodies. Their bodies can be divided into three parts: the cephalon (head), the pereon (thorax) and the abdomen. The pereon comprises most of the length of the body. It is divided into seven segments known as pereonites. The cephalon is usually fused to the first pereonite; while the highly reduced and almost invisible abdomen is attached to the posterior of the seventh pereonite. They possess two pairs of antennae, with the first pair usually longer than the second pair. The cephalon contains mandibles, maxillae and maxillipeds which function as mouthparts.

Each pereonite has a pair of appendages known as pereopods. The first two pairs are modified into raptorial appendages known as gnathopods. These are used for feeding and defence, as well as locomotion. The third and fourth pair of pereopods are usually reduced or absent altogether. In the third and fourth pereonites are two pairs of gills. Sometimes a third pair of gills may also be present on the second pereonite. In mature females, brood pouches formed by extensions of the coxae (oostegites) are present on the third and fourth pereonites. The fifth to seventh pair of pereopods are smaller than the gnathopods and are used for clasping objects the animals anchor themselves upon.

Most caprellids are highly sexually dimorphic, with the males usually being far larger than the females.

== Ecology ==
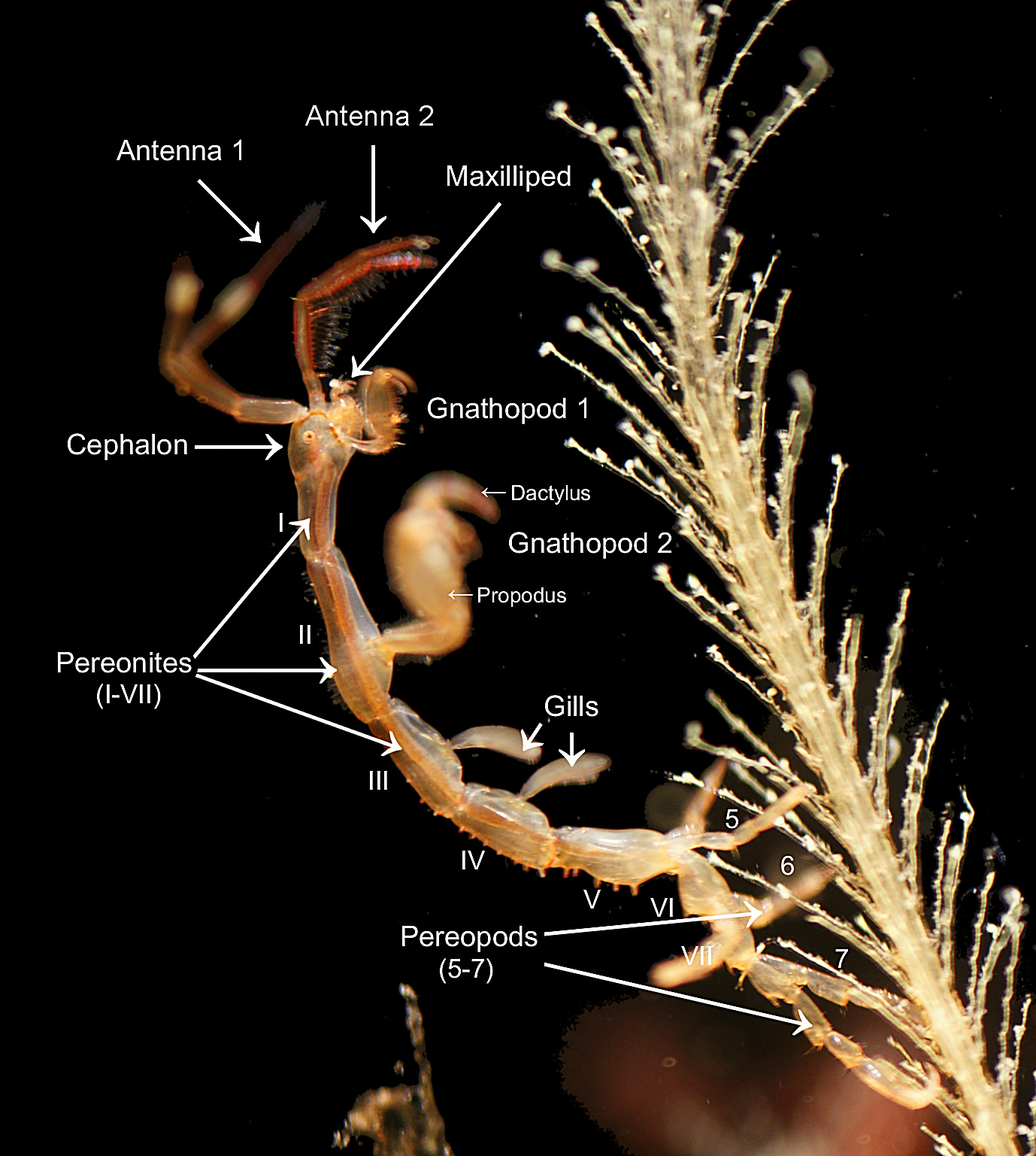
Anatomy of male Caprella mutica

Caprellids are exclusively marine and are found in oceans worldwide. A few species are found in the ocean depths, but most prefer low intertidal zones and subtidal waters among eelgrass, hydroids and bryozoans. They are typically seen attached to substrate by their grasping appendages called the pereopods.

Caprellids are omnivorous, feeding on diatoms, detritus, protozoans, smaller amphipods and crustacean larvae. Some species are filter feeders, using their antennae to filter food from the water or scrape it off the substrate. Most species are predators that sit and wait like a praying mantis, with their gnathopods ready to snatch any smaller invertebrates which come along. They accentuate their adaptive form and colouration by assuming an angular pose, resembling that of the fronds among which they live. They remain motionless for long periods of time while waiting to ambush their prey, often protozoa or small worms.

Caprellids are typically preyed upon by surf perch, shrimp, nudibranchs such as the lion nudibranch Melibe leonina and brooding anemones (Epiactis prolifera). Since they often inhabit eelgrass beds with sessile jellyfish, (Haliclystus and Thaumatoscyphus), the caprellids frequently become jellyfish food. Caprellids are not normally considered a main source of food for fish, but when shiner perch (Cymatogaster aggregata) migrate into the eelgrass beds for reproduction, they target caprellids.

== Reproduction and growth ==
Mating can only occur when the female is between the new and hardened exoskeletons, which both male and female molt in order to grow. After mating the female will brood the fertilised eggs within her brood pouch. The young will hatch and emerge as juvenile adults. After mating, the female in some species have been known to kill the males by injecting venom from a claw within their gnathopod.

== Taxonomy ==
Caprellidae is classified under the superfamily Caprelloidea which belongs to the parvorder Caprellidira of the infraorder Corophiida and the suborder Senticaudata. Caprellidae contains 1345 genera in three subfamilies.

Caprellinae

- Abyssicaprella McCain, 1966
- Aciconula Mayer, 1903
- Aeginella Boeck, 1861
- Aeginellopsis Arimoto, 1970
- Aeginina Norman, 1905
- Caprella Lamarck, 1801
- Caprellaporema Guerra-García, 2003
- Cubadeutella Ortiz et al., 2009
- Deutella Mayer, 1890
- Eupariambus K. H. Barnard, 1957
- Hemiaegina Mayer, 1890
- Heterocaprella Arimoto, 1976
- Liriopes Arimoto, 1978
- Liropropus Laubitz, 1995
- Liropus Mayer, 1890
- Mayerella Huntsman, 1915
- Metacaprella Mayer, 1903
- Metaprotella Mayer, 1890
- Monoliropus Mayer, 1903
- Noculacia Mayer, 1903
- Orthoprotella Mayer, 1903
- Paracaprella Mayer, 1890
- Paradeutella Mayer, 1890
- Paradicaprella Hirayama, 1990
- Paraprotella Mayer, 1903
- Pariambus Stebbing, 1888
- Parvipalpina Stephensen, 1944
- Parvipalpus Mayer, 1890
- Pedoculina Carausu, 1941
- Pedonculocaprella Kaim-Malka, 1983
- Pedotrina Arimoto, 1978
- Postoparacaprella Arimoto, 1981
- Premohemiaegina Arimoto, 1978
- Pretritella Arimoto, 1980
- Proaeginina Stephensen, 1940
- Proliropus Mayer, 1903
- Propodalirius Mayer, 1903
- Protella Dana, 1853
- Protellina Stephensen, 1944
- Protellopsis Stebbing, 1888
- Protoaeginella Laubitz & Mills, 1972
- Prototritella Arimoto, 1977
- Pseudaeginella Mayer, 1890
- Pseudolirius Mayer, 1890
- Pseudoliropus Laubitz, 1970
- Pseudoprotella Mayer, 1890
- Tanzacaprella Guerra-García, 2001
- Thorina Stephensen, 1944
- Triantella Mayer, 1903
- Triliropus Mayer, 1903
- Triperopus Mayer, 1903
- Triprotella Arimoto, 1970
- Tritella Mayer, 1890
- Tropicaprella Guerra-García & Takeuchi, 2003
- Verrucaprella Laubitz, 1995

Paracercopinae

- Cercops Krøyer, 1843
- Paracercops Vassilenko, 1972
- Pseudocercops Vassilenko, 1972

Phtisicinae

- Aeginoides Schellenberg, 1926
- Caprellina Thomson, 1879
- Caprellinoides Stebbing, 1888
- Chaka Griffiths, 1974
- Dodecas Stebbing, 1883
- Dodecasella K. H. Barnard, 1931
- Hemiproto McCain, 1968
- Hircella Mayer, 1882
- Jigurru Guerra-García, 2006
- Liriarchus Mayer, 1912
- Mayericaprella Guerra-García, 2006
- Metaproto Mayer, 1903
- Paedaridium Mayer, 1903
- Paraproto Mayer, 1903
- Perotripus Dougherty & Steinberg, 1953
- Phtisica Slabber, 1769
- Prellicana Mayer, 1903
- Protogeton Mayer, 1903
- Protomima Mayer, 1903
- Protoplesius Mayer, 1903
- Pseudocaprellina Sundara Raj, 1927
- Pseudododecas McCain & Gray, 1971
- Pseudoprellicana Guerra-García, 2006
- Pseudoproto Mayer, 1903
- Pseudoprotomima McCain, 1969
- Quadrisegmentum Hirayama, 1988
- Semidodecas Laubitz, 1995
- Symmetrella Laubitz, 1995
