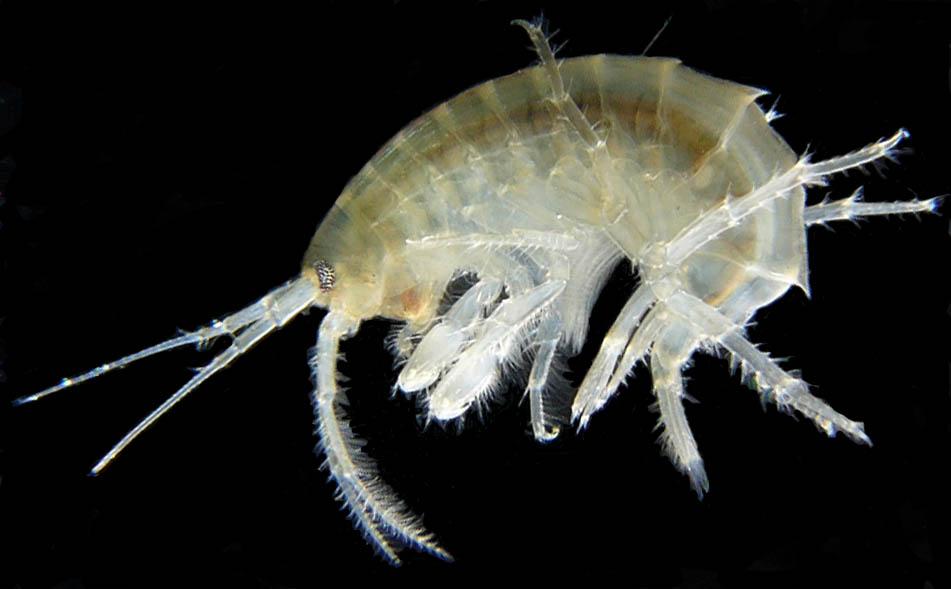
- Gammarus roeselii (Gammaroidea: Gammaridae)

Scientific classification
- Kingdom: Animalia
- Phylum: Arthropoda
- Clade: Pancrustacea
- Class: Malacostraca
- Order: Amphipoda
- Suborder: Senticaudata; Lowry & Myers, 2013

Infraorders
- See text

= Senticaudata =

Suborder of crustaceans

Senticaudata is one of the six suborders of the crustacean order Amphipoda (the group of scuds or sideswimmers). It includes some 6000 species, which is more than 50% of the currently recognized amphipod diversity.

Senticaudata was split off from the traditional suborder Gammaridea by James K. Lowry and Alan A. Myers in 2013, as a part of a process of reorganising the higher taxonomy of amphipods. It now also encompasses the previously recognized Caprellidea and Corophiidea. The suborder is defined by the presence of strong apical setae on the 1st and 2nd uropods.

Senticaudata contains much of the world's freshwater amphipod diversity, though the majority of its species are marine. It is currently subdivided into the six infraorders Bogidiellida, Carangoliopsida, Corophiida, Gammarida, Hadziida, and Talitrida.

== Infraorders ==
Classification based on WoRMS. Families marked with "M" are monotypic (containing only one genus).

=== Bogidiellida Hertzog, 1936 ===
Superfamilies:

- Bogidielloidea
  - Artesiidae Holsinger, 1980
  - Bogidiellidae Hertzog, 1936
  - Parabogidiellidae Cannizzaro & Sawacki, 2020
  - Salentinellidae Bousfield, 1977

=== Carangoliopsida Bousfield, 1977 ===
Superfamilies:

- Carangoliopsoidea
  - Carangoliopsidae Bousfield, 1977 M
  - Kairosidae Lowry & Myers, 2013 M

=== Corophiida Leach, 1814 (sensu Lowry & Myers, 2013) ===
This infraorder contains the families of skeleton shrimp and whale lice. The whole group was previously treated as its own suborder, Corophiidea, before being subsumed into Senticaudata.

Superfamilies:

- Aetiopedesoidea
  - Aetiopedesidae Myers & Lowry, 2003 M
  - Paragammaropsidae Myers & Lowry, 2003
- Aoroidea
  - Aoridae Stebbing, 1899
  - Unciolidae Myers & Lowry, 2003
- Caprelloidea
  - Caprellidae Leach, 1814
  - Caprogammaridae Kudrjaschov & Vassilenko, 1966 M
  - Cyamidae Rafinesque, 1815
  - Dulichiidae Dana, 1849
  - Podoceridae Leach, 1814
- Cheluroidea
  - Cheluridae Allman, 1847
- Chevalioidea
  - Chevaliidae Myers & Lowry, 2003
- Corophioidea
  - Ampithoidae Boeck, 1871
  - Corophiidae Leach, 1814
- Isaeoidea
  - Isaeidae Dana, 1852
- Microprotopoidea
  - Australomicroprotopidae Myers, Lowry & Billingham, 2016 M
  - Microprotopidae Myers & Lowry, 2003 M
- Neomegamphoidea
  - Neomegamphopidae Myers, 1981
  - Priscomilitaridae Hirayama, 1988
- Photoidea
  - Ischyroceridae Stebbing, 1899
  - Kamakidae Myers & Lowry, 2003
  - Photidae Boeck, 1871
- Protodulichioidea
  - Protodulichiidae Ariyama in Ariyama & Hoshino, 2019 M
- Rakirooidea
  - Rakiroidae Myers & Lowry, 2003 M

=== Gammarida Latreille, 1802 ===
This infraorder contains the family of scuds, along with the families endemic to Lake Baikal.

Superfamilies:

- Allocrangonyctoidea
  - Allocrangonyctidae Holsinger, 1989 M
  - Crymostygidae Kristjánsson & Svavarsson, 2004 M
  - Dussartiellidae Lowry & Myers, 2012
  - Kergueleniolidae Lowry & Myers, 2013 M
  - Pseudoniphargidae Karaman, 1993
- Crangonyctoidea
  - Austroniphargidae Iannilli, Krapp & Ruffo, 2011
  - Chillagoeidae Lowry & Myers, 2012 M
  - Crangonyctidae Bousfield, 1973
  - Giniphargidae Lowry & Myers, 2012 M
  - Kotumsaridae Messouli, Holsinger & Ranga Reddy, 2007 M
  - Neoniphargidae Bousfield, 1977
  - Niphargidae Bousfield, 1977
  - Paracrangonyctidae Bousfield, 1983 M
  - Paramelitidae Bousfield, 1977
  - Perthiidae Williams & J. L. Barnard, 1988 M
  - Pseudocrangonyctidae Holsinger, 1989
  - Sandroidae Lowry & Myers, 2012 M
  - Sternophysingidae Holsinger, 1992 M
  - Uronyctidae Lowry & Myers, 2012 M
- Gammaroidea
  - Acanthogammaridae Garjajeff, 1901
  - Anisogammaridae Bousfield, 1977
  - Baikalogammaridae Kamaltynov, 2002 M
  - Bathyporeiidae d'Udekem d'Acoz, 2011
  - Behningiellidae Kamaltynov, 2002
  - Carinogammaridae Tachteew, 2001 M
  - Crypturopodidae Kamaltynov, 2002
  - Eulimnogammaridae Kamaltynov, 1999
  - Falklandellidae Lowry & Myers, 2012
  - Gammaracanthidae Bousfield, 1989 M
  - Gammarellidae Bousfield, 1977
  - Gammaridae Leach, 1814
  - Iphigenellidae Kamaltynov, 2002 M
  - Luciobliviidae Tomikawa, 2007 M
  - Macrohectopidae Sowinsky, 1915 M
  - Mesogammaridae Bousfield, 1977
  - Micruropodidae Kamaltynov, 1999
  - Ommatogammaridae Kamaltynov, 2010
  - Pachyschesidae Kamaltynov, 1999 M
  - Pallaseidae Tachteew, 2001
  - Paraleptamphopidae Bousfield, 1983
  - Phreatogammaridae Bousfield, 1983
  - Pontogammaridae Bousfield, 1977
  - Sensonatoridae Lowry & Myers, 2012 M
  - Typhlogammaridae Bousfield, 1978
  - Zaramillidae Lowry & Myers, 2016 M

=== Hadziida S. Karaman, 1943 ===
Superfamilies:

- Calliopioidea
  - Calliopiidae G. O. Sars, 1893
  - Cheirocratidae d'Udekem d'Acoz, 2010
  - Hornelliidae d'Udekem d'Acoz, 2010 M
  - Megaluropidae Thomas & J. L. Barnard, 1986
  - Pontogeneiidae Stebbing, 1906
- Hadzioidea
  - Crangoweckeliidae Lowry & Myers, 2012
  - Eriopisidae Lowry & Myers, 2013
  - Gammaroporeiidae Bousfield, 1979 M
  - Hadziidae S. Karaman, 1943
  - Maeridae Krapp-Schickel, 2008
  - Melitidae Bousfield, 1973
  - Metacrangonyctidae Boutin & Messouli, 1988
  - Nuuanuidae Lowry & Myers, 2013
- Magnovioidea
  - Magnovidae Alves, Lowry & Jonsson, 2020 M
- Mirabestioidea
  - Mirabestiidae Horton et al., 2026 M

=== Talitrida Rafinesque, 1815 ===
This infraorder contains the family of terrestrial land- or sandhoppers.

Superfamilies:

- Caspicoloidea
  - Caspicolidae Birstein, 1945 M
- Hyaloidea
  - Ceinidae J. L. Barnard, 1972
  - Chiltoniidae J. L. Barnard, 1972
  - Dogielinotidae Gurjanova, 1953
  - Eophliantidae Sheard, 1936
  - Hyalellidae Bulyčeva, 1957 M
  - Hyalidae Bulyčeva, 1957
  - Najnidae J. L. Barnard, 1972
  - Phliantidae Stebbing, 1899
  - Plioplateidae J. L. Barnard, 1978 M
  - Temnophliantidae Griffiths, 1975
- Kurioidea
  - Kuriidae J. L. Barnard, 1964
  - Tulearidae Ledoyer, 1979 M
- Talitroidea
  - Arcitalitridae Myers & Lowry, 2020
  - Brevitalitridae Myers & Lowry, 2020
  - Curiotalitridae Myers & Lowry, 2020 M
  - Makawidae Myers & Lowry, 2020
  - Protorchestiidae Myers & Lowry, 2020
  - Talitridae Rafinesque, 1815
  - Uhlorchestiidae Myers & Lowry, 2020 M
