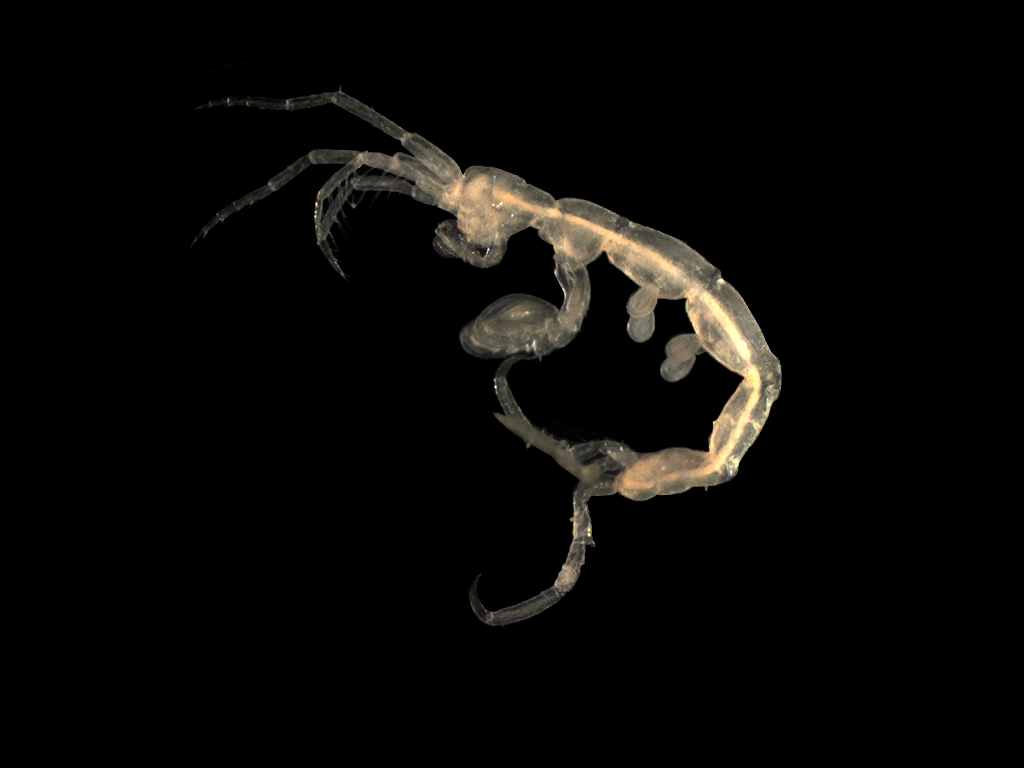
- Pariambus typicus

Scientific classification
- Domain: Eukaryota
- Kingdom: Animalia
- Phylum: Arthropoda
- Class: Malacostraca
- Order: Amphipoda
- Suborder: Senticaudata
- Infraorder: Corophiida
- Parvorder: Caprellidira; Leach, 1814

Families
- See text

= Caprellidira =

Group of crustaceans

Caprellidira is a parvorder of marine crustaceans of the infraorder Corophiida. The group includes skeleton shrimps (Caprellidae) and whale lice (Cyamidae).

Fifteen families are currently recognised in the group. They are grouped into seven superfamilies.

- Superfamily Aetiopedesoidea Myers & Lowry, 2003
  - Aetiopedesidae Myers & Lowry, 2003
  - Paragammaropsidae Myers & Lowry, 2003
- Superfamily Caprelloidea Leach, 1814
  - Caprellidae Leach, 1814 - Skeleton shrimps
  - Caprogammaridae Kudrjaschov & Vassilenko, 1966
  - Cyamidae Rafinesque, 1815 - Whale lice
  - Dulichiidae Laubitz, 1983
  - Podoceridae Leach, 1814
- Superfamily Isaeoidea Dana, 1853
  - Isaeidae Dana, 1853
- Superfamily Microprotopoidea Myers & Lowry, 2003
  - Australomicroprotopidae Myers, Lowry & Billingham, 2016
  - Microprotopidae Myers & Lowry, 2003
- Superfamily Neomegamphopoidea Myers, 1981
  - Neomegamphopidae Myers, 1981
  - Priscomilitariidae Hirayama, 1988
- Superfamily Photoidea Boeck, 1871
  - Ischyroceridae Stebbing, 1899
  - Kamakidae Myers & Lowry, 2003
  - Photidae Boeck, 1871
- Superfamily Rakirooidea Myers & Lowry, 2003
  - Rakiroidae Myers & Lowry, 2003
