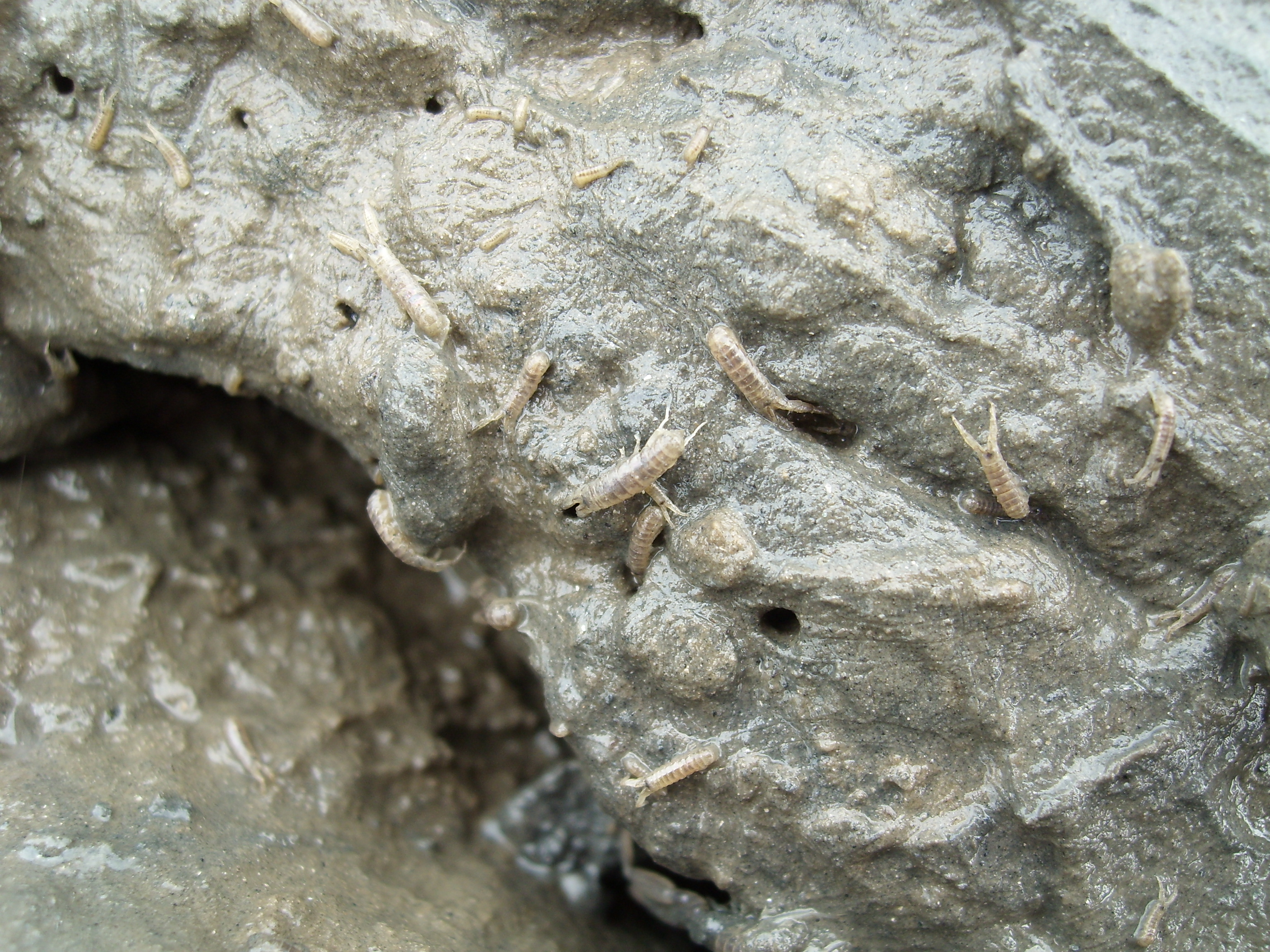
- Corophium volutator

Scientific classification
- Kingdom: Animalia
- Phylum: Arthropoda
- Class: Malacostraca
- Order: Amphipoda
- Suborder: Senticaudata
- Infraorder: Corophiida
- Parvorder: Corophiidira; Leach, 1814 (sensu Lowry & Myers, 2013)

Families
- See text

Synonyms
- Corophiida Leach, 1814 (sensu Myers & Lowry, 2003)

= Corophiidira =

Group of crustaceans

Corophiidira is a parvorder of marine amphipod crustaceans in the infraorder Corophiida. In a previous classification, this taxon was treated as an infraorder and was then itself called Corophiida.

== Families ==
The group contains six families classified into four superfamilies.

- Superfamily Aoroidea Stebbing, 1899
  - Aoridae Stebbing, 1899
  - Unciolidae Myers & Lowry, 2003
- Superfamily Cheluroidea Allman, 1847
  - Cheluridae Allman, 1847
- Superfamily Chevalioidea Myers & Lowry, 2003
  - Chevaliidae Myers & Lowry, 2003
- Superfamily Corophioidea Leach, 1814
  - Ampithoidae Boeck, 1871
  - Corophiidae Leach, 1814
