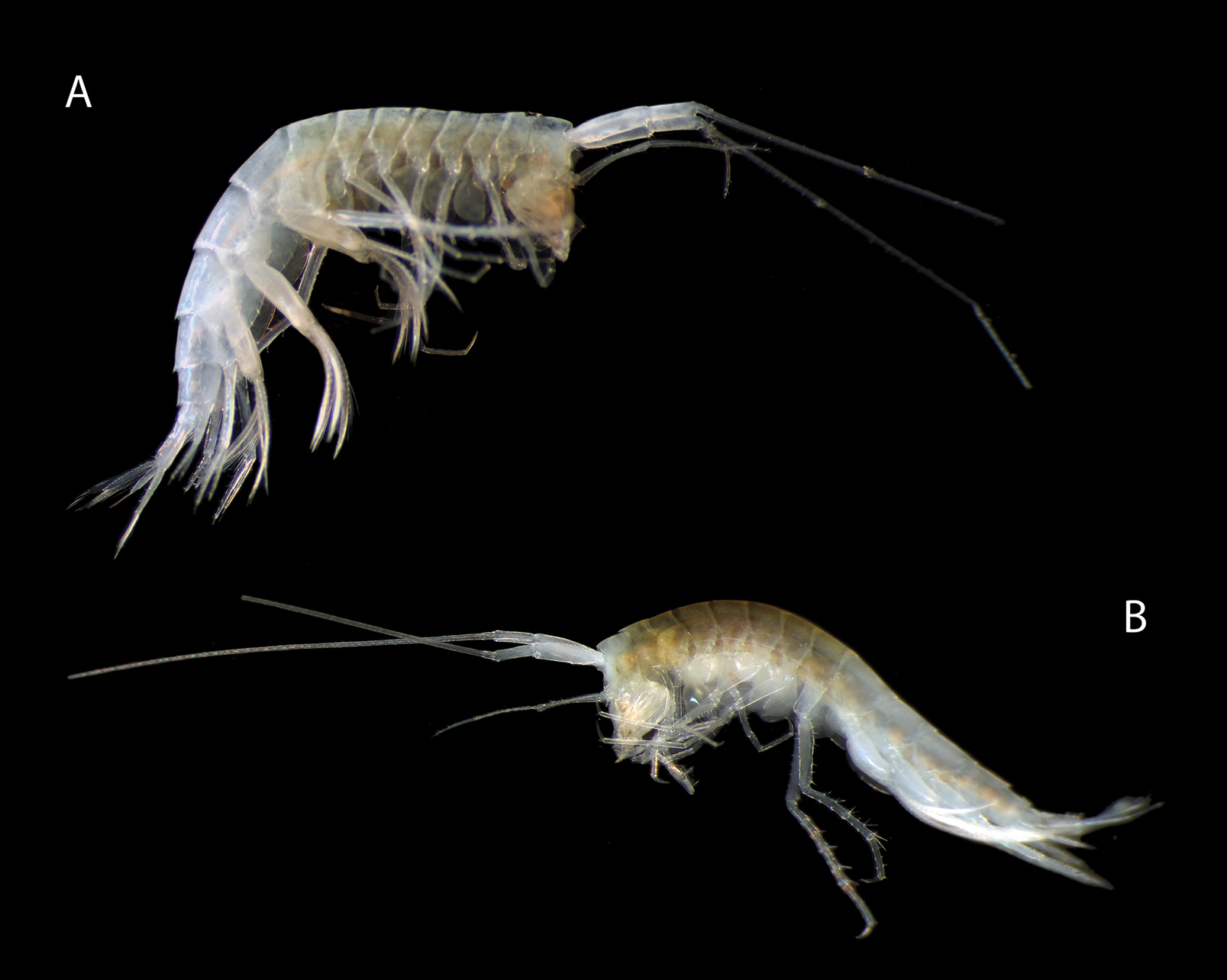
- Mirabestia maisie

Scientific classification
- Kingdom: Animalia
- Phylum: Arthropoda
- Clade: Pancrustacea
- Class: Malacostraca
- Order: Amphipoda
- Family: Mirabestiidae
- Genus: Mirabestia; Horton, Valls Domedel, Stewart & Thurston, 2026

= Mirabestia =

Monotypic genus of crustaceans

Mirabestia is a monotypic genus of deep-sea amphipod crustaceans belonging to the monotypic family Mirabestiidae. The genus was first described in 2026 from specimens collected in the Clarion-Clipperton Zone.

== Characteristics ==
Mirabestia are distinguished by their unique appendage morphology and genetic divergence from other hadziid amphipods. The genus exhibits specialised deep-sea adaptations and diagnostic anatomical structures described from specimens from the Clarion–Clipperton Zone.

== Taxonomy ==
Mirabestia was described as part of a newly erected superfamily due to its distinct morphological and phylogenetic characteristics within the infraorder Hadziida. The family was established following analyses of diagnostic appendage structures and molecular data supporting its separation from related amphipod lineages. The genus was described together with the superfamily Mirabestioidea, the family Mirabestiidae, and the genus Pseudolepechinella.

== Species ==
The genus Mirabestia is monotypic, containing a single recognized species:

- Mirabestia maisie Horton, Valls Domedel, Stewart & Thurston, 2026

== Etymology ==
Mirabestia’s derives from Latin mirus meaning "wonderful" or "extraordinary". It is combined with bestia meaning "beast", to reference to the extraordinary morphology exhibited by the beast.

== Research ==
A taxonomy workshop focused on describing new amphipod species from the Clairon-Clipperton Zone was held in 2024 at the Department of Invertebrate Zoology and Hydrobiology, Faculty of Biology and Environmental Protection, and University of Łódź. The week-long event was organised by Anna Jażdżewska of the University of Łódź and Tammy Horton of the National Oceanography Centre, bringing together 16 experts and early-career researchers to collaborate on species identification and description. Collaborating institutions include Natural History Museum, the Canadian Museum of Nature, NIWA, the University of Hamburg, Senckenberg, and the University Museum of Bergen.
