= Aequigidiella =

Scientific classification
- Domain: Eukaryota
- Kingdom: Animalia
- Phylum: Arthropoda
- Class: Malacostraca
- Order: Amphipoda
- Family: Bogidiellidae
- Genus: Aequigidiella; Botosaneanu and Stock, 1989
- Species: A. aquilifera

Binomial name
- Aequigidiella aquilifera Botosaneanu and Stock, 1989

Genus of crustaceans

Aequigidiella is a monotypic genus of amphipod crustaceans. It contains only the species Aequigidiella aquilifera. The genus name (Aequigidiella) derives from a combination of the words aequi for equal and Bogidiella for its taxonomic relatives. The species name (aquilifera) comes from the Latin name for a soldier that bears the eagle standard of a Roman legion and refers to structures which are flag-like on the male specimens.

== Description ==
The males of the genus are 4 millimetres (0.16 in) in size, while females can grow up to 4.5 millimetres (0.18 in). The head has a strongly produced lateral lobe, and the smaller antennal sinus is rounded and distinctly visible. It has seven coxal plates, with the first four overlapping. The first plate is as long as it is wide, while the last six are wider than they are long.

The second segment of its first antenna is the longest and the third is the shortest. It has a 2-segmented accessory flagellum with a small, knob-like distal section. Its primary flagellum has nine to eleven segments which are slender and have robust aesthetasks. The second antenna has a bulbous first segment and slender fourth and fifth segments. It has a 5-segmented flagellum and one unstalked aesthetask on the first, second, and fifth segments.

Its mandible has a 3-segmented palp. The incisors are very heave and composed of two prongs. It has 13 fine teeth on a triangular right lacinia, while its left lacinia is mobile and has five serrations. The molars are small, and both have long seta.

=== Similar genera ===
Aequigidiella shares certain features with the genus Artesia from Texas; their body shapes are generally alike. Their coxal plates are of similar size and shape, as are the biramous and aequiramous pleopods. The propodus of the first and second gnathopods are also roughly the same shape. However, it differs in its uncleft telson, its mouthparts, the fact that its seventh coxal plate is not smaller than the sixth, and the different second pleopod on the male specimens.

Spelaeogammarus from Brazil is another genus which shares affinities with Aequigidiella. It is one of few other bogidiellids to have aequiramous pleopods. Additionally, it has analogous large coxal plates and morphologically similar mouthparts. However, it, like Artesia, differs in its telson and gnathopods.

== Taxonomy ==
The holotype specimen of A. aquilifera is housed at the Zoological Museum Amsterdam along with several paratype specimens. These original specimens were collected by Louis Deharveng and Didier Rigal during one of their "Thai-Maros expeditions" and were later described by Lazăr Botoșăneanu and Jan Stock.

Aequididiella appears to be an intermediate between the two related families Artesiidae and Bogidiellidae, contributing evidence to the idea that the two families should be united.
