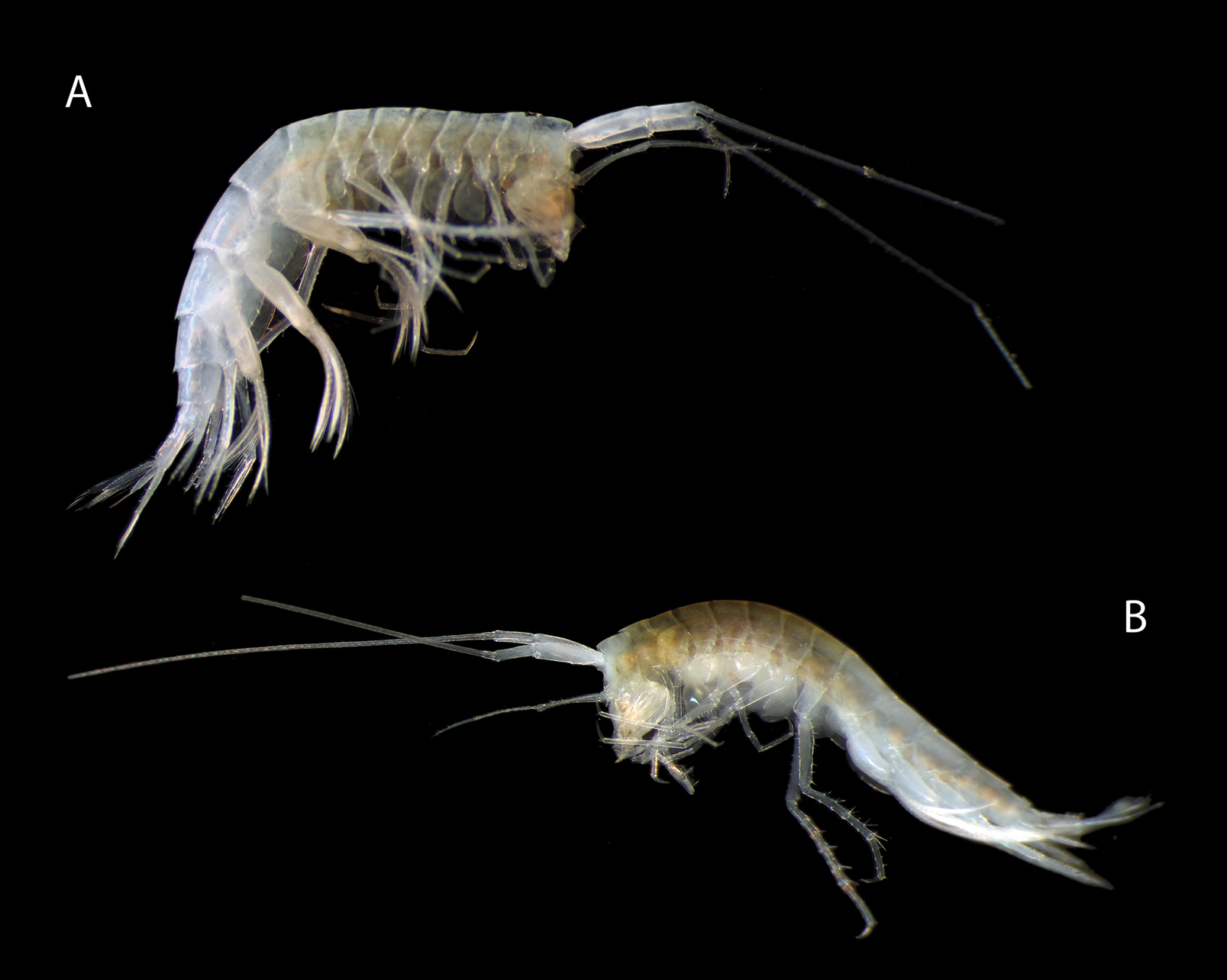
- Mirabestia maisie

Scientific classification
- Kingdom: Animalia
- Phylum: Arthropoda
- Clade: Pancrustacea
- Class: Malacostraca
- Order: Amphipoda
- Suborder: Senticaudata
- Infraorder: Hadziida
- Superfamily: Mirabestioidea; Horton, Valls Domedel, Stewart & Thurston, 2026

= Mirabestioidea =

Superfamily of deep-sea amphipod crustaceans

Mirabestioidea is a superfamily of deep-sea amphipod crustaceans in the infraorder Hadziida. The family was first described in 2026 from specimens collected in the Clarion-Clipperton Zone.

== Characteristics ==
Mirabestioidea are distinguished by their unique appendage morphology and genetic divergence from other hadziid amphipods. The superfamily exhibits specialised deep-sea adaptations and diagnostic anatomical structures described from specimens from the Clarion–Clipperton Zone.

== Taxonomy ==
Mirabestioidea is described as a newly erected superfamily due to its distinct morphological and phylogenetic characteristics within the infraorder Hadziida. The superfamily was established following analyses of diagnostic appendage structures and molecular data supporting its separation from related amphipod lineages. The superfamilly was described together with the genera Pseudolepechinella.

The superfamily Mirabestioidea is currently monotypic, containing a single recognized family:

- Mirabestiidae Horton, Valls Domedel, Stewart & Thurston, 2026

== Etymology ==
Mirabestioidea’s name is based on the type genus Mirabestia, which derives from Latin mirus meaning "wonderful" or "extraordinary". It is combined with bestia meaning "beast", to reference to the extraordinary morphology exhibited by the beast.

== Research ==
A taxonomy workshop focused on describing new amphipod species from the Clairon-Clipperton Zone was held in 2024 at the Department of Invertebrate Zoology and Hydrobiology, Faculty of Biology and Environmental Protection, and University of Łódź. The week-long event was organised by Anna Jażdżewska of the University of Łódź and Tammy Horton of the National Oceanography Centre, bringing together 16 experts and early-career researchers to collaborate on species identification and description. Collaborating institutions include Natural History Museum, the Canadian Museum of Nature, NIWA, the University of Hamburg, Senckenberg, and the University Museum of Bergen.

== See also ==
- Mirabestia maisie
