= Stimpsonia =

Stimpsonia may refer to:

- Stimpsonia (plant), a genus of plants in the family Primulaceae
- Stimpsonia, a genus of amphipods in the family Aoridae, synonym of Microdeutopus
- Stimpsonia, a genus of crustaceans in the family Xanthidae, synonym of Lipkemedaeus
