= Mexiweckelia hardeni =

Conservation status
- Imperiled (NatureServe)

Scientific classification
- Domain: Eukaryota
- Kingdom: Animalia
- Phylum: Arthropoda
- Class: Malacostraca
- Order: Amphipoda
- Family: Hadziidae
- Genus: Mexiweckelia
- Species: M. hardeni

Binomial name
- Mexiweckelia hardeni Holsinger, 1992

Species of crustacean

Mexiweckelia hardeni is a species of amphipod in the family Hadziidae.
