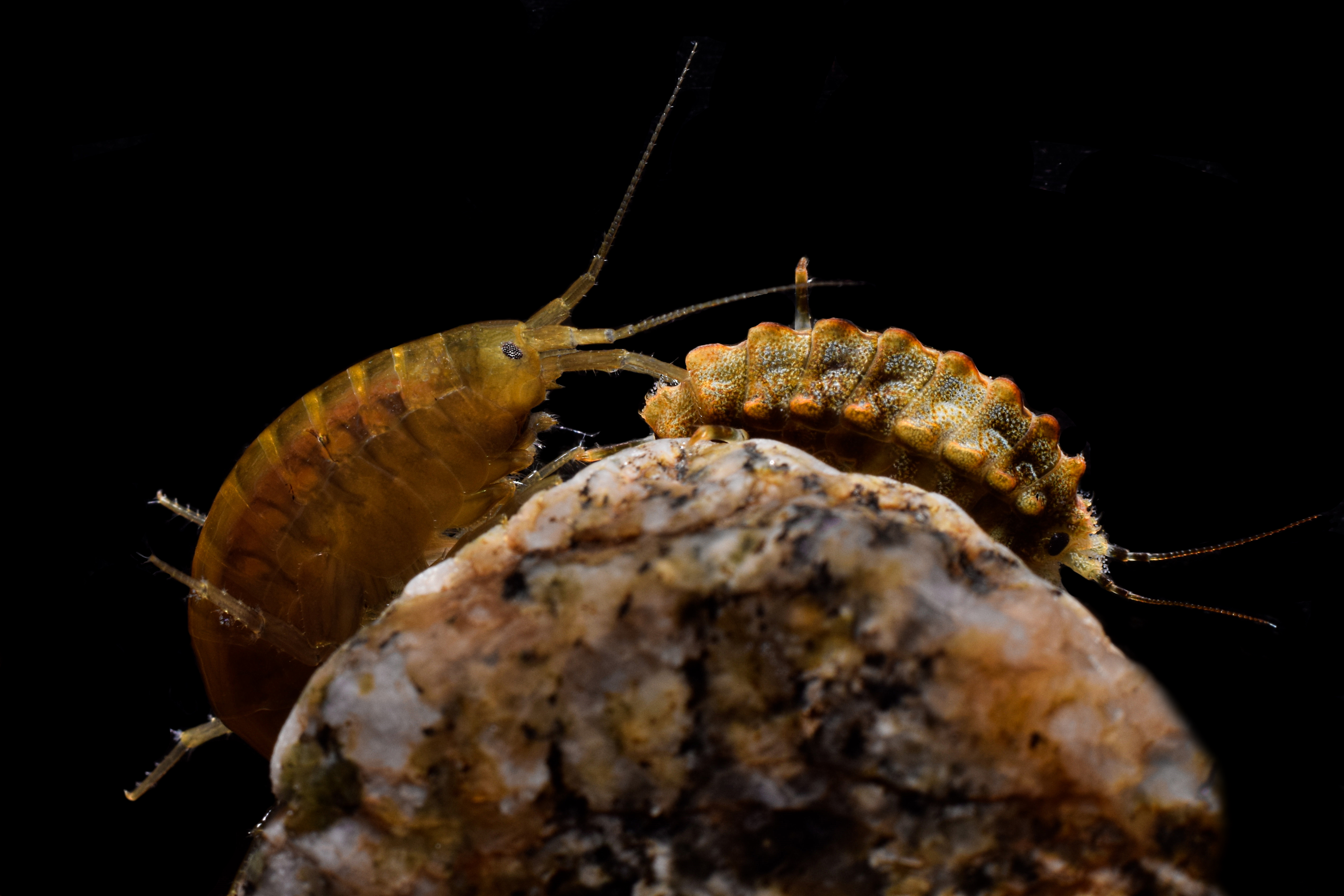
- Brandtia latissima latior (to the right)

Scientific classification
- Domain: Eukaryota
- Kingdom: Animalia
- Phylum: Arthropoda
- Class: Malacostraca
- Order: Amphipoda
- Family: Acanthogammaridae
- Subfamily: Acanthogammarinae
- Genus: Brandtia; Spence Bate, 1863
- Species: B. latissima

Binomial name
- Brandtia latissima (Gerstfeldt, 1858)

= Brandtia =

Genus of crustaceans

Brandtia is a genus of amphipod in the family Acanthogammaridae. Like other members of the family, it is endemic to Lake Baikal. This omnivore is found at depths of 1–65 m (3–213 ft) among stones. It is up to 1.9 cm (0.75 in) long.

The extent of the genus is controversial. Generally it is restricted to the single species Brandtia latissima and its several subspecies, but others still include Brandtia parasitica, an epibiont of lubomirskiid sponges, which has been moved to Dorogostaiskia. Other species formerly placed in Brandtia have been moved to Gmelinoides (G. fasciatus and G. fasciatoides).
