= Isaea =

Scientific classification
- Kingdom: Animalia
- Phylum: Arthropoda
- Class: Malacostraca
- Order: Amphipoda
- Family: Isaeidae
- Genus: Isaea; H. Milne-Edwards, 1830

Species
- Isaea montagui Milne-Edwards, 1830; Isaea elmhirsti Patience, 1909

Genus of crustaceans

Isaea is a small genus of amphipod crustaceans that live commensally on the mouthparts of other crustaceans.

== Isaea montagui ==
I. montagui was named in 1830 by Henri Milne-Edwards in honour of George Montagu. It lives on the mouthparts of the spider crab Maja squinado, and is found from the West of Ireland to the Mediterranean Sea.

== Isaea elmhirsti ==
I. elmhirsti was named in 1909 by Alexander Patience in honour of Richard Elmhirst, who was the director at that time of the University Marine Biological Station at Millport. It lives on the mouthparts of the European lobster, Homarus gammarus, and is found from Ireland to the Bay of Biscay.
