= Aetiopedes =

Scientific classification
- Domain: Eukaryota
- Kingdom: Animalia
- Phylum: Arthropoda
- Class: Malacostraca
- Order: Amphipoda
- Suborder: Senticaudata
- Infraorder: Corophiida
- Parvorder: Caprellidira
- Superfamily: Aetiopedesoidea
- Family: Aetiopedesidae; Myers & Lowry, 2003
- Genus: Aetiopedes; Moore & Myers, 1988
- Species: A. gracilis

Binomial name
- Aetiopedes gracilis Moore & Myers, 1988

Genus of crustaceans

Aetiopedes is a monotypic genus of amphipods belonging to the monotypic family Aetiopedesidae. The only species is Aetiopedes gracilis.

The species is found in Australia.
