= Isaeidae =

Scientific classification
- Kingdom: Animalia
- Phylum: Arthropoda
- Clade: Pancrustacea
- Class: Malacostraca
- Order: Amphipoda
- Suborder: Senticaudata
- Infraorder: Corophiida
- Parvorder: Caprellidira
- Superfamily: Isaeoidea; Dana, 1852
- Family: Isaeidae; Dana, 1853

Family of crustaceans

Isaeidae is a family of amphipods. It is the only family classified under the superfamily Isaeoidea. It contains the following genera:

- Isaea Milne-Edwards, 1830
- Pagurisaea Moore, 1983
