= Mexiweckelia =

Scientific classification
- Kingdom: Animalia
- Phylum: Arthropoda
- Clade: Pancrustacea
- Class: Malacostraca
- Order: Amphipoda
- Family: Hadziidae
- Genus: Mexiweckelia; Holsinger & W. L. Minckley, 1971

Genus of crustaceans

Mexiweckelia is a genus of amphipods in the family Hadziidae. There are at least three described species in the genus.

== Species ==
These three species belong to the genus Mexiweckelia:

- Mexiweckelia colei Holsinger & W. L. Minckley, 1971
- Mexiweckelia hardeni Holsinger, 1992
- Mexiweckelia mitchelli Holsinger, 1973
