= Pontogammaridae =

Scientific classification
- Domain: Eukaryota
- Kingdom: Animalia
- Phylum: Arthropoda
- Class: Malacostraca
- Order: Amphipoda
- Suborder: Senticaudata
- Infraorder: Gammarida
- Parvorder: Gammaridira
- Superfamily: Gammaroidea
- Family: Pontogammaridae; Bousfield, 1977

Family of crustaceans

Pontogammaridae is a family of crustaceans belonging to the order Amphipoda.

== Genera ==
Genera:

- †Andrussovia Derzhavin, 1927
- Compactogammarus Stock, 1974
- Niphargogammarus Birstein, 1945
- Niphargoides G.O. Sars, 1894
- Obesogammarus Stock, 1974
- Pandorites G.O. Sars, 1895
- Paraniphargoides Stock, 1974
- Pontogammarus Sowinsky, 1904
- †Praegmelina Derzhavin, 1927
- Stenogammarus Martynov, 1924
- Turcogammarus Karaman & Barnard, 1979
- Uroniphargoides Stock, 1974
- Wolgagammarus Stock, 1974
