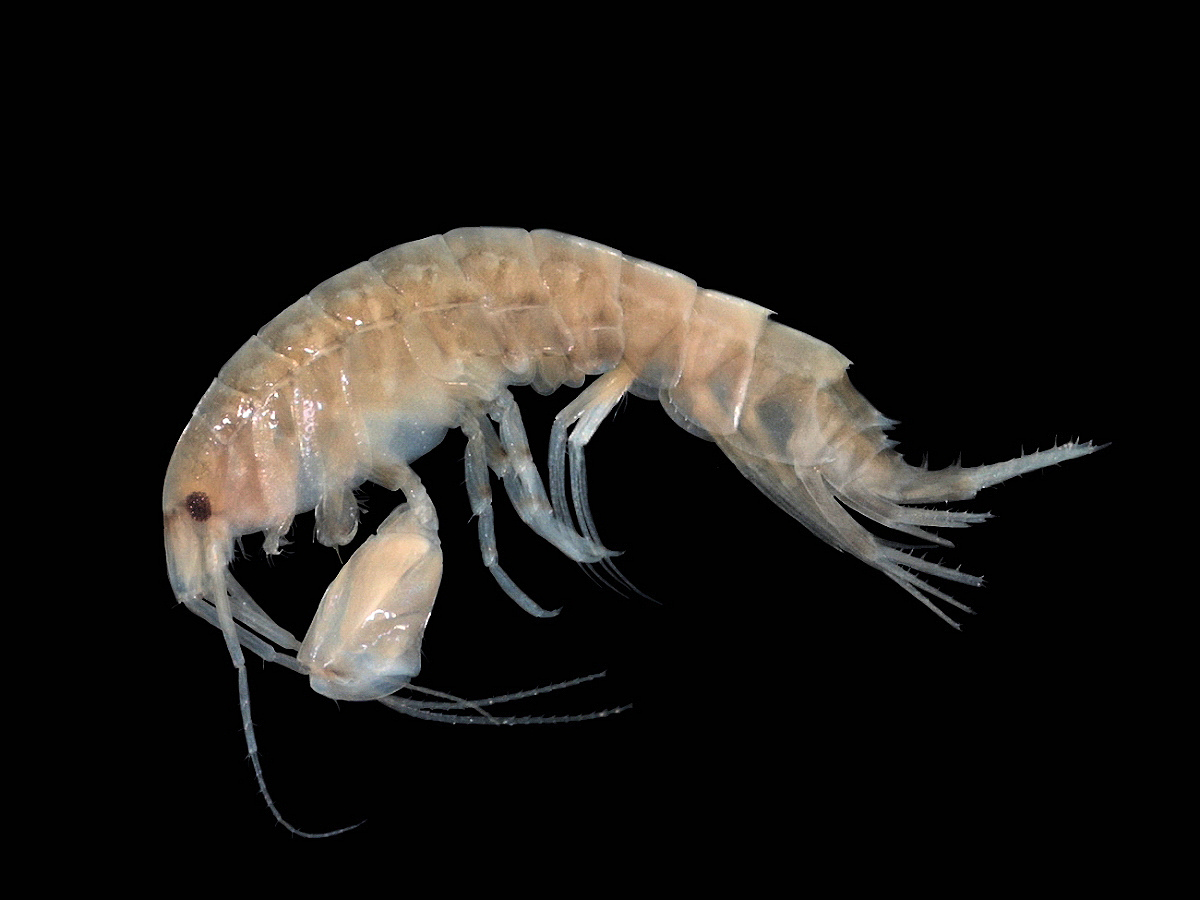
- male
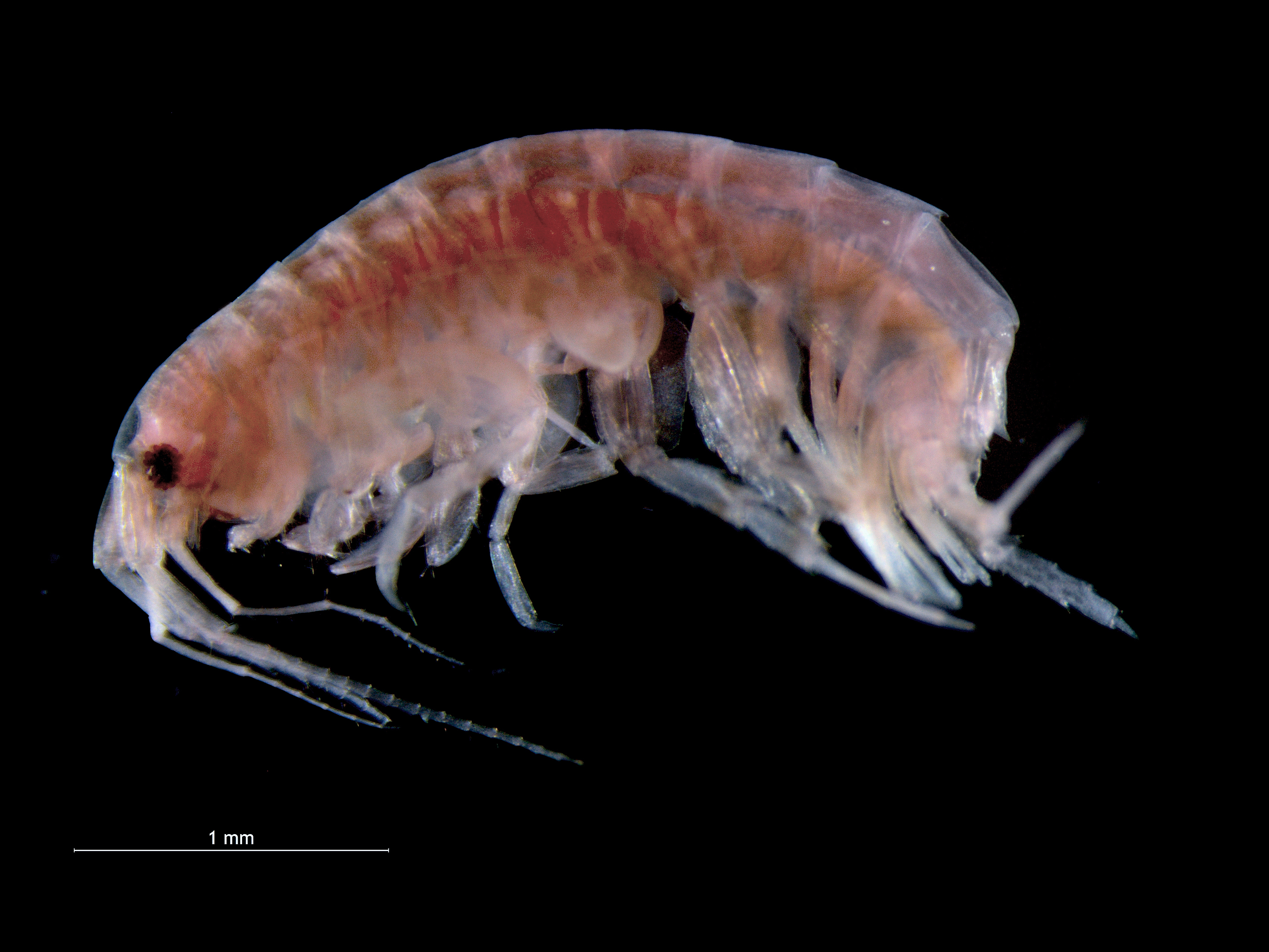
- female

Scientific classification
- Kingdom: Animalia
- Phylum: Arthropoda
- Clade: Pancrustacea
- Class: Malacostraca
- Order: Amphipoda
- Family: Melitidae
- Genus: Abludomelita
- Species: A. obtusata

Binomial name
- Abludomelita obtusata (Montagu, 1813)

Synonyms
- Cancer obtusatus Montagu, 1813; Melita obtusata (Montagu, 1813)

= Abludomelita obtusata =

Species of crustacean

Abludomelita obtusata is a brown colored species of amphipod crustacean. It may grow up to 9 millimetres (0.35 in) long and lacks a rostrum. It lives in marine sediments of any grain size, but with a preference for a mud content of 10%–40%, around the coasts of the southern North Sea.

== Taxonomy ==
Abludomelita obtusata is part of the family Melitidae and genus Abludomelita. Abludomelita obtusata was mentioned as Melita obtusata in previous literature, but then was put in the genus Abludomelita in 1981.

== Distribution and habitat ==
The species was found in high percentages in Belgium (35%), the United Kingdom (32%) and the Netherlands (19%). Prior to 1994, there was no obvious distribution pattern for Abludomelita obtusata. However, during 1994 to 2001, Abludomelita obtusata was observed near coastal zones of the North Sea and was also found on an eastern coastline of the North Sea, but less frequently. After 1994, the distribution and density of the species increased greatly.

== Temperature ==
Abludomelita obtusata can reside in cold to moderate temperatures ranging from 0 to 12 degrees Celsius. However, the highest frequency of the species were found in a water temperature ranging from 11 to 14 degrees Celsius.

== Salinity ==
The majority of Abludomelita obtusata are found in a salinity range of 30 to 35 ppm.

== Depth ==
Abludomelita obtusata have been previously collected at depths ranging from 0 m to 200–300 m, with the majority of the species collected at a depth of 20–30 m.

== Anatomy and appearance ==
Abludomelita obtusata is a small marine organism classified as an amphipod. It has a slender body shape and grows up to nine mm in standard length. The species is a brownish color, and has no rostrum. As a member of the Amphipoda order, Abludomelita obtusata is gonochorous and sexually dimorphic, with the females being larger than the males. In addition, males also have a distinct pair of second claws. A typical Abludomelita obtusata life span is approximately one year.

== Mating behavior ==
As a member of the order Amphipoda, the males locate the female Abludomelita obtusata by using their antennae to sense the female's pheromones. Once the female is "ready" to be fertilized, the male Abludomelita obtusata inseminates the female via her marsupium or brood pouch. Then, the female fertilizes her eggs in the marsupium. There are no larval stages for the young, they hatch directly into juvenile stage a few days after they are fertilized and they are released into the ocean. They reach sexual maturity after six moults.
