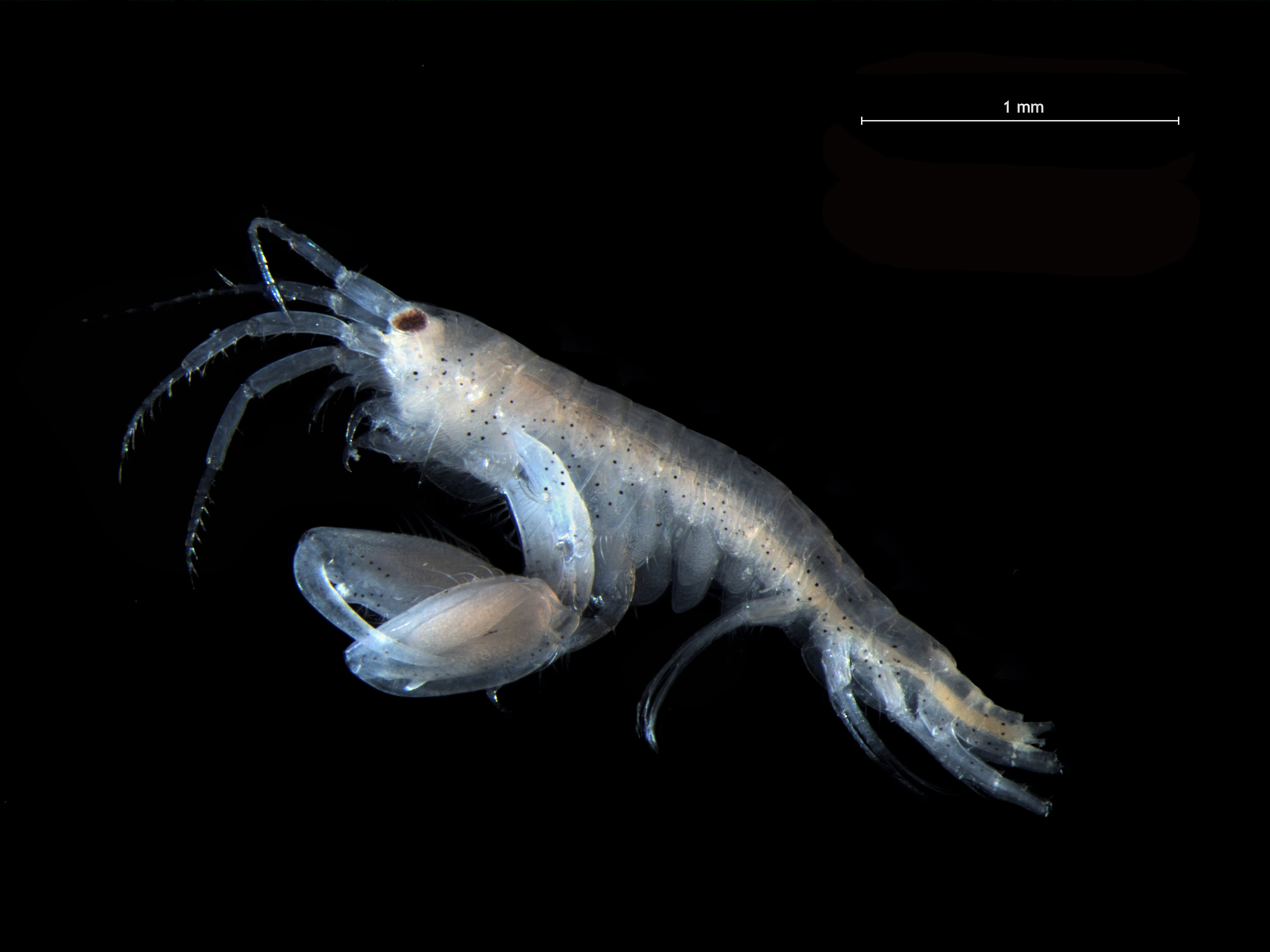
- Microprotopus maculatus

Scientific classification
- Domain: Eukaryota
- Kingdom: Animalia
- Phylum: Arthropoda
- Class: Malacostraca
- Order: Amphipoda
- Suborder: Senticaudata
- Infraorder: Corophiida
- Parvorder: Caprellidira
- Superfamily: Microprotopoidea
- Family: Microprotopidae; Myers & Lowry, 2003
- Genus: Microprotopus; Norman, 1867

= Microprotopus =

Genus of crustaceans

Microprotopus is a genus of amphipods belonging to the monotypic family Microprotopidae.

The species of this genus are found in Europe, America.

Species:

- Microprotopus bicuspidatus Rabindranath, 1971
- Microprotopus longimanus Chevreux, 1887
- Microprotopus maculatus Norman, 1867
- Microprotopus raneyi Wigley, 1966
- Microprotopus shoemakeri Lowry, 1972
