= Rakiroa =

Scientific classification
- Domain: Eukaryota
- Kingdom: Animalia
- Phylum: Arthropoda
- Class: Malacostraca
- Order: Amphipoda
- Suborder: Senticaudata
- Infraorder: Corophiida
- Parvorder: Caprellidira
- Superfamily: Rakirooidea; Myers & Lowry, 2003
- Family: Rakiroidae; Myers & Lowry, 2003
- Genus: Rakiroa; Lowry & Fenwick, 1982
- Species: R. rima

Binomial name
- Rakiroa rima Lowry & Fenwick, 1982

Genus of crustaceans

Rakiroa is a monotypic genus of amphipods belonging to the monotypic family Rakiroidae. The only species is Rakiroa rima. Both genus and species were first described in 1982 by James K. Lowry and Graham David Fenwick.

The species is found in New Zealand.
