= Garjajewia =

Scientific classification
- Kingdom: Animalia
- Phylum: Arthropoda
- Class: Malacostraca
- Order: Amphipoda
- Family: Acanthogammaridae
- Genus: Garjajewia; Sowinsky, 1915

Genus of crustaceans

Garjajewia is a genus of amphipod crustaceans in the family Acanthogammaridae.

== Species ==
The following species are included:

- Garjajewia cabanisii Dybowsky, 1874
- Garjajewia dershawini Sowinsky, 1915
- Garjajewia dogieli Sowinsky, 1915
- Garjajewia ninae Bazikalova, 1945
- Garjajewia rosea Garjajeff, 1901
- Garjajewia sarsi Sowinsky, 1915
