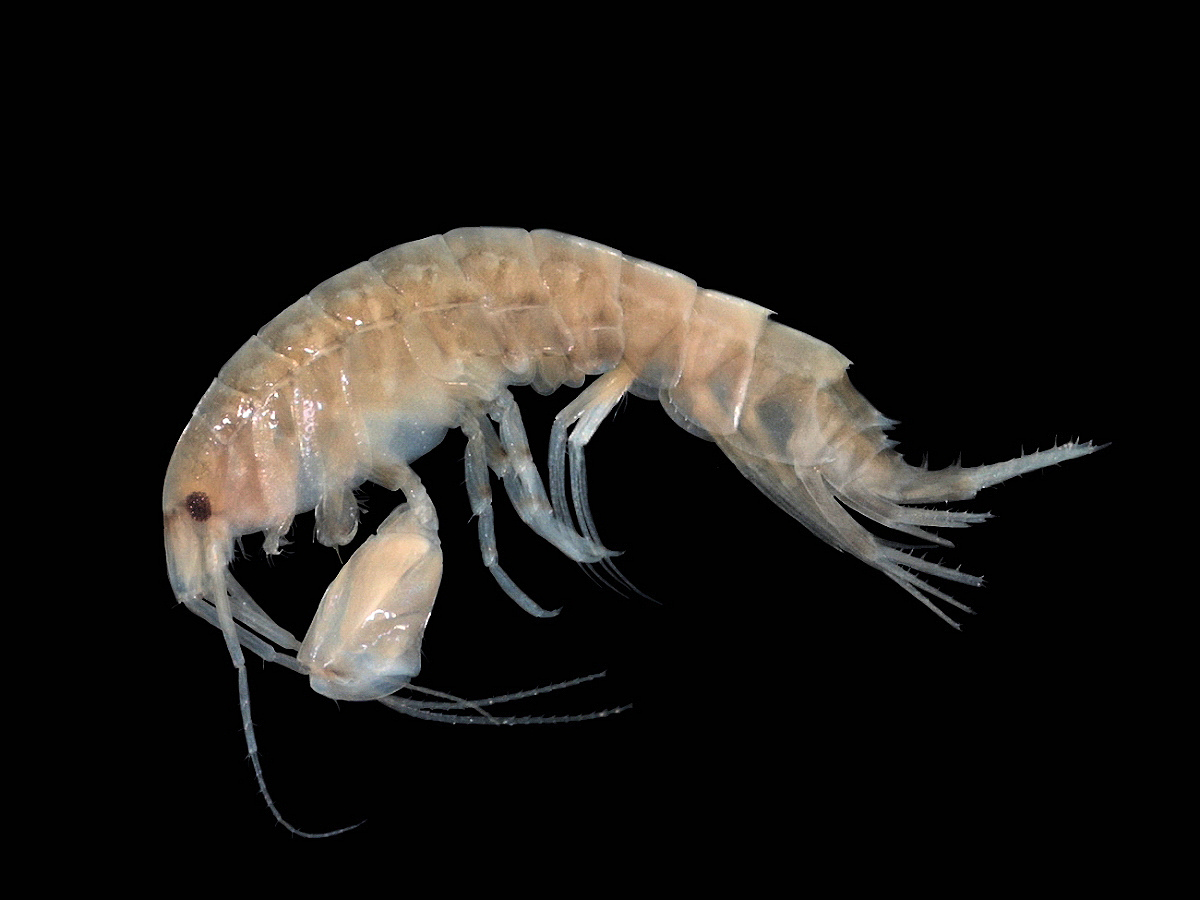
- Abludomelita obtusata

Scientific classification
- Domain: Eukaryota
- Kingdom: Animalia
- Phylum: Arthropoda
- Class: Malacostraca
- Order: Amphipoda
- Family: Melitidae
- Genus: Abludomelita

Species
- see text

= Abludomelita =

Genus of crustaceans

Abludomelita is a genus of amphipod crustacean.

== Species ==
The genus contains the following species:

- Abludomelita aculeata (Chevreux, 1911)
- Abludomelita amoena (Hansen, 1888)
- Abludomelita breviarticulata (Ren, 2012)
- Abludomelita denticulata (Nagata, 1965)
- Abludomelita gladiosa (Bate, 1862)
- Abludomelita huanghaiensis (Ren, 2012)
- Abludomelita japonica (Nagata, 1965)
- Abludomelita klitinii Labay, 2016
- Abludomelita machaera (K.H. Barnard, 1955)
- Abludomelita mucronata (Griffiths, 1975)
- Abludomelita obtusata (Montagu, 1813)
- Abludomelita okhotensis Labay, 2016
- Abludomelita richardi (Chevreux, 1900)]
- Abludomelita rotundactyla (Ren, 2012)
- Abludomelita sexstachya (Gamo, 1977)
- Abludomelita somovae (Bulycheva, 1952)
- Abludomelita unamoena (Hirayama, 1987)

The genus previous contained two species that have been transferred to other genera as Alsacomelita semipalmata and Meltita tuberculata.
