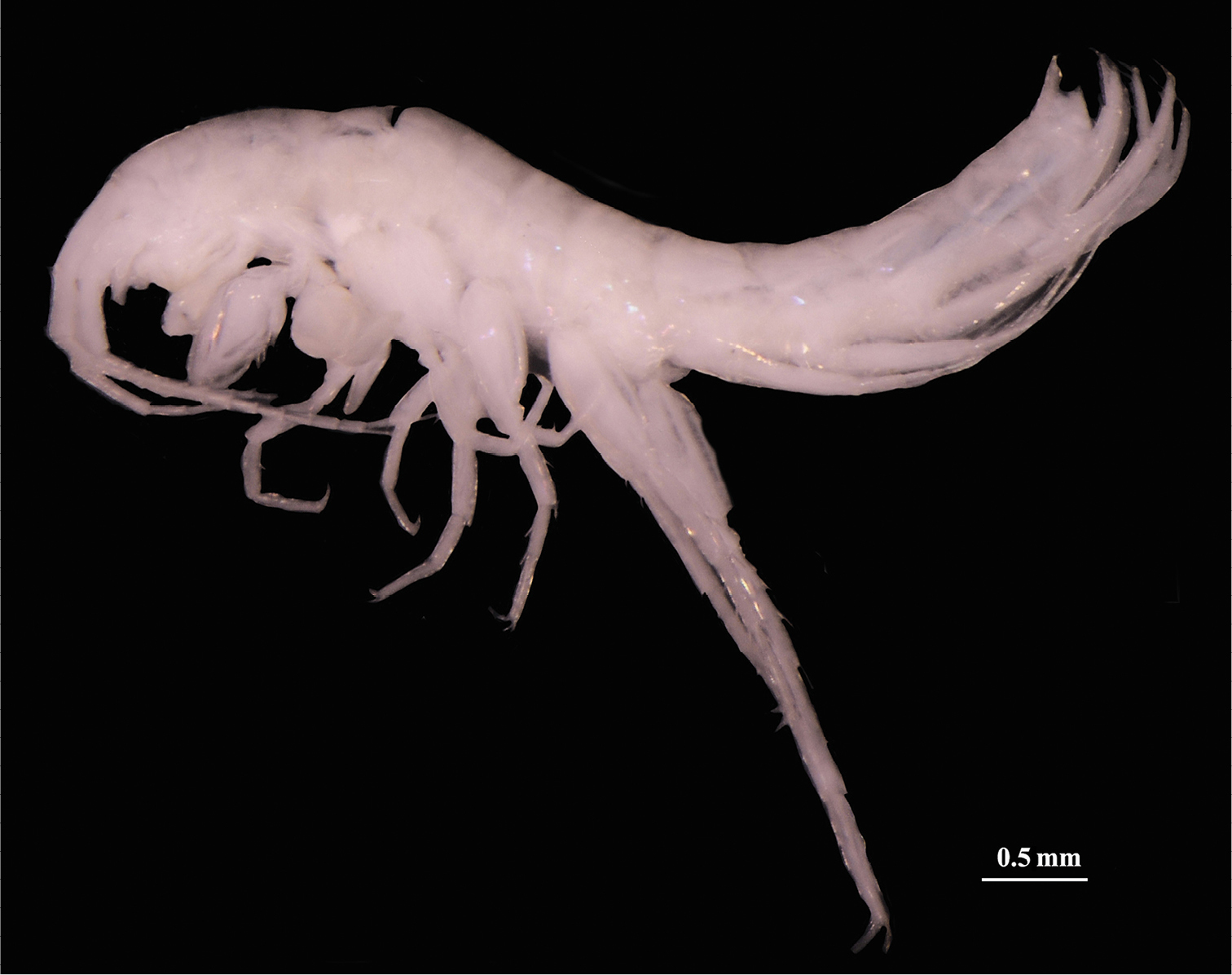
- Bogidiella pingxiangensis

Scientific classification
- Kingdom: Animalia
- Phylum: Arthropoda
- Clade: Pancrustacea
- Class: Malacostraca
- Order: Amphipoda
- Suborder: Senticaudata
- Infraorder: Bogidiellida
- Parvorder: Bogidiellidira
- Superfamily: Bogidielloidea
- Family: Bogidiellidae; Hertzog, 1936

= Bogidiellidae =

Family of crustaceans

Bogidiellidae is a family of amphipod crustaceans, containing the following genera:

- Actogidiella Stock, 1981
- Aequigidiella Botosaneanu & Stock, 1989
- Afridiella Karaman & Barnard, 1979
- Antillogidiella Stock, 1981
- Arganogidiella Koenemann & Holsigner, 1999
- Argentinogidiella Koenemann & Holsigner, 1999
- Aurobogidiella Karaman, 1988
- Bermudagidiella Koenemann & Hosinger, 1999
- Bogidiella Hertzog, 1933
- Bogidomma Bradbury & Williams, 1996
- Bollegidia Ruffo, 1974
- Cabogidiella Stock & Vonk, 1992
- Dycticogidiella Grosso & Claps, 1985
- Eobogidiella G. Karaman, 1982
- Fidelidiella Jaume, Gràcia & Boxshall, 2007
- Grossogidiella Koenemann & Holsinger, 1999
- Guagidiella Stock, 1981
- Hebraegidiella G. Karaman, 1988
- Indogidiella Koenemann & Holsigner, 1999
- Maghrebidiella Diviacco & Ruffo, 1985
- Marigidiella Stock, 1981
- Marinobogidiella Karaman, 1981
- Medigidiella Stock, 1981
- Megagidiella Koenemann & Holsinger, 1999
- Mesochthongidiella Grosso & Fernandez, 1985
- Mexigidiella Stock, 1981
- Nubigidiella G. Karaman, 1988
- Omangidiella Iannilli, Holsinger, Ruffo & Vonk, 2006
- Orchestigidiella Stock, 1981
- Parabogidiella Holsinger in Holsinger & Longley, 1980
- Patagongidiella Grosso & Fernández, 1993
- Racovella Jaume, Gràcia & Boxshall, 2007
- Stockigidiella Iannilli, Holsinger, Ruffo & Vonk, 2006
- Stygogidiella Stock, 1981
- Xystriogidiella Stock, 1984
