= Actogidiella =

Scientific classification
- Kingdom: Animalia
- Phylum: Arthropoda
- Clade: Pancrustacea
- Class: Malacostraca
- Order: Amphipoda
- Family: Bogidiellidae
- Genus: Actogidiella; Stock, 1981
- Species: A. cultrifera

Binomial name
- Actogidiella cultrifera Stock, 1981

Genus of crustaceans

Actogidiella is a monotypic genus of amphipod crustaceans. It contains only the species Actogidiella cultrifera. The genus' name derives from the Greek word for seacoast and the suffix -gidiella which refers to its habitat.

== Description ==
The genus has small coxal plates which are wider than they are long. Towards the rear, these plates do not overlap. There are three pairs of coxal gills.

The mandibles are reduced in chewing capabilities, having a slightly transformed palp with swollen second segments. The first maxilla has a palp with 2 segments and a bristled inner lose. The second maxilla is similar, but is slightly less bristly. The maxilliped has short inner and outer lobed which have short spines pointed outwards. This maxilliped is not sexually dimorphous, but is the same in both male and female members of the genus.

The pleopodal lungs are not transformed, but one spine on the second segment of the second pleopod is transformed in male specimens. The first uropod is transformed in both males and females. The endopodites are curved and dagger-like; the exopodite is shorter than the endopodite; in females they are rod-like with transformed spines. The second uropod is not transformed, and the third uropod is monomerous with a very shallow outward notch.

== Taxonomy ==
=== Specimens ===
The type specimen of Actogidiella cultrifera is a female collected in the Virgin Islands by Jan Hendrik Stock west of the Well Bay airfield on Beef Island, in the species' type locality. Today, the specimen is kept at the Zoological Museum of Amsterdam along with several paratype and allotype specimens.

=== Species ===
In its original description in 1981, Actogidiella was stated to be a monotypic genus containing only the species Actogidiella cultrifera. However, it is possible that related species could be placed into the genus, and one as yet unnamed species in Curaçao is likely to be another member.

== Distribution and habitat ==
The genus has been recorded in Tortolla in the West Indies. Its habitat can be intertidal, interstitial, or marine beaches.
