= Lepechinellidae =

Scientific classification
- Kingdom: Animalia
- Phylum: Arthropoda
- Clade: Pancrustacea
- Class: Malacostraca
- Order: Amphipoda
- Superfamily: Dexaminoidea
- Family: Lepechinellidae; Schellenberg, 1926

Family of crustaceans

Lepechinellidae is a family of crustaceans belonging to the order Amphipoda, and was first described in 1926 by Adolf Schellenberg.

Genera:

- Lepechinella Stebbing, 1908
- Lepechinelloides Thurston, 1980
- Lepechinellopsis Ledoyer, 1982
- Lepesubchela Johansen & Vader, 2015
- Paralepechinella Pirlot, 1933
- Psuedolepechinella Horton & Lörz, 2026
