= Bermudagidiella =

Conservation status
- Critically Endangered (IUCN 3.1)

Scientific classification
- Kingdom: Animalia
- Phylum: Arthropoda
- Class: Malacostraca
- Order: Amphipoda
- Family: Bogidiellidae
- Genus: Bermudagidiella; Koenemann & Hosinger, 1999
- Species: B. bermudensis

Binomial name
- Bermudagidiella bermudensis (Stock, Sket & Iliffe, 1987)

Synonyms
- Bogidiella bermudiensis Stock, Sket & Illiffe, 1987

Genus of crustaceans

Bermudagidiella bermudiensis is a species of crustacean in the family Bogidiellidae. It is the only species in the genus Bermudagidiella, and is endemic to Bermuda.
