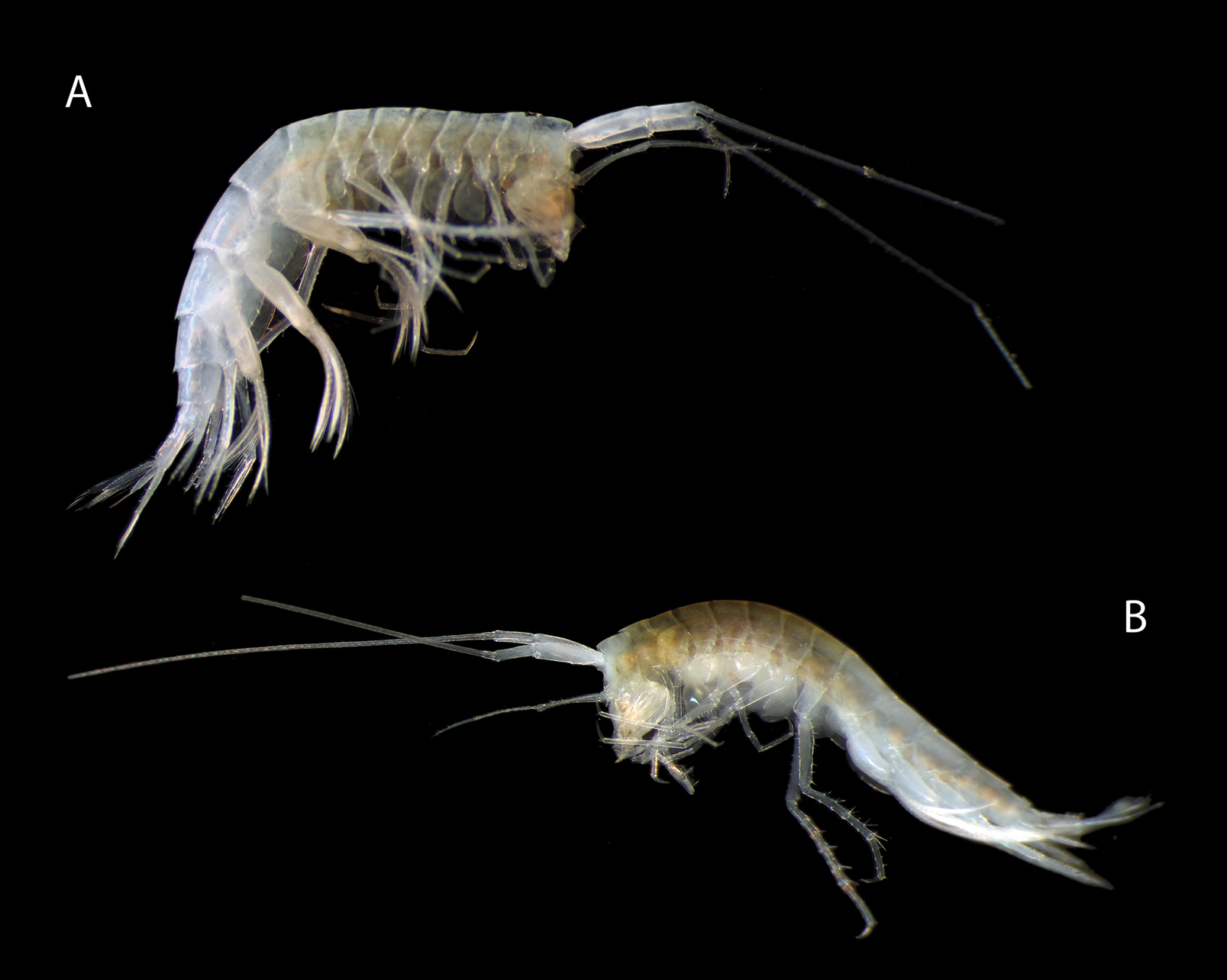

Scientific classification
- Kingdom: Animalia
- Phylum: Arthropoda
- Clade: Pancrustacea
- Class: Malacostraca
- Order: Amphipoda
- Family: Mirabestiidae
- Genus: Mirabestia
- Species: M. maisie

Binomial name
- Mirabestia maisie Horton, Valls Domedel, Stewart & Thurston, 2026

= Mirabestia maisie =

Species of deep-sea crustacean

Mirabestia maisie is a species of deep-sea amphipod crustaceans in the family Mirabestiidae. The species was described in 2026 from specimens collected in the Clarion-Clipperton Zone.

== Description ==
Mirabestia maisie is found at depths of approximately 4,130 to 4,309 metres (2.566 to 2.677 mi). One specimen of a female’s body is approximately 7.45 millimetres (0.293 in), while a male specimen grew about 6.46 millimetres (0.254 in). An immature one is 5.06 millimetres (0.199 in). Mirabestia maisie lays 5 eggs.

== Taxonomy ==
Mirabestia maisie was described as part of a newly erected superfamily due to its distinct morphological and phylogenetic characteristics within the infraorder Hadziida. The species was discovered following analyses of diagnostic appendage structures and molecular data supporting its separation from related amphipod lineages.

== Etymology ==
Mirabestia maisie is named after the first author's younger daughter, Maisie.

== See also ==
- Mirabestia
- Pseudolepechinella apricity
