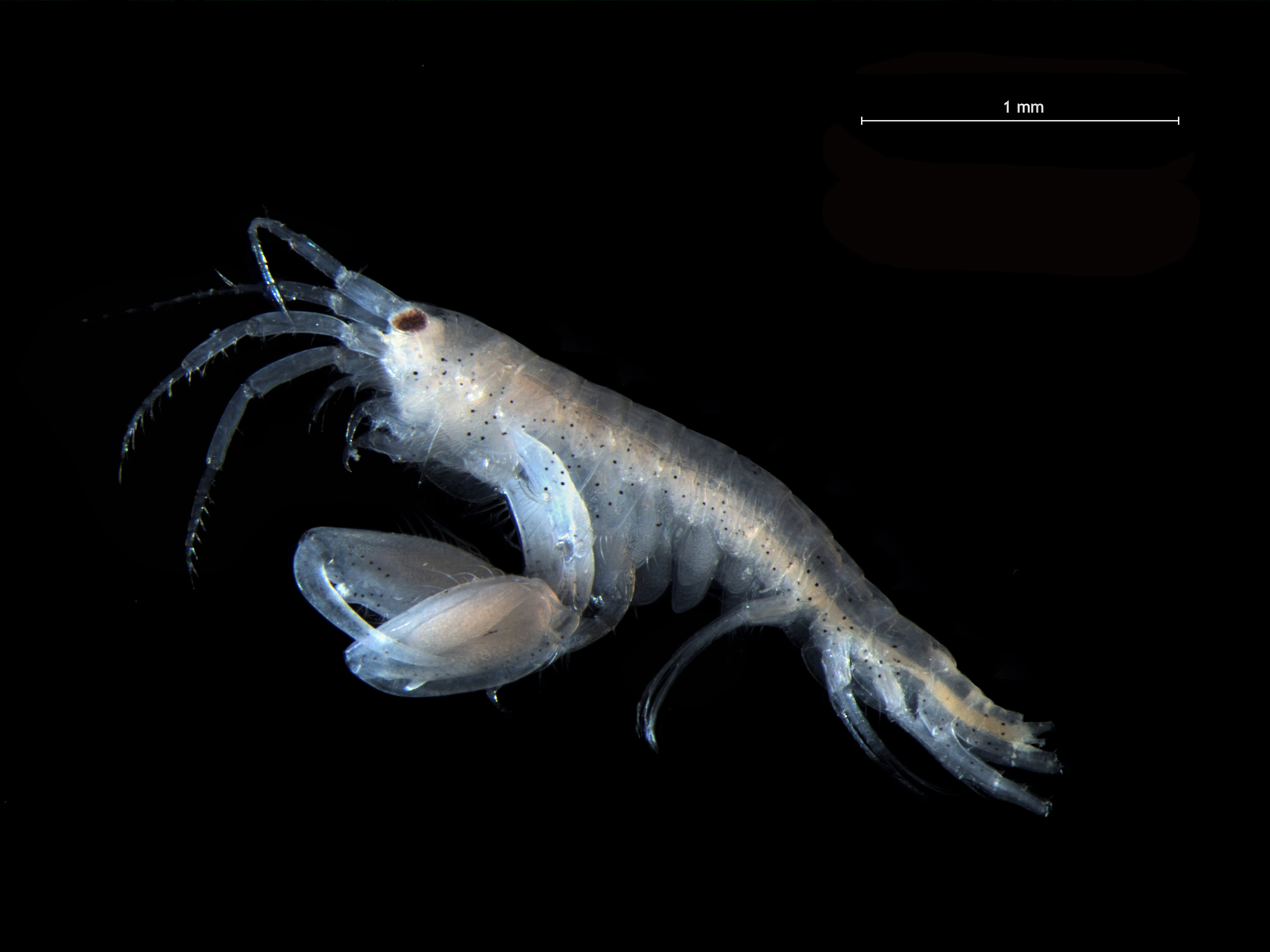

Scientific classification
- Kingdom: Animalia
- Phylum: Arthropoda
- Class: Malacostraca
- Order: Amphipoda
- Family: Microprotopidae
- Genus: Microprotopus
- Species: M. maculatus

Binomial name
- Microprotopus maculatus Norman, 1867

= Microprotopus maculatus =

Species of crustacean

Microprotopus maculatus is a species of crustacean. It belongs to the genus Microprotopus and family Microprotopidae. It was described by Alfred Merle Norman in 1867.

== Description ==
Microprotopus maculatus approximately length is 3 mm. It has blackish densely mottled. This species lives between depth range from 0 to 70 meters and often on sandy bottoms.

== Distribution ==
Microprotopus maculatus mainly found in the European waters such as North-East Atlantic, North Sea; particularity from Isefjord to the Adriatic. Also, significant amount found in the North American waters, Mediterranean and Indian Ocean.
