= Praegmelina =

Praegmelina Temporal range: Miocene

Scientific classification
- Domain: Eukaryota
- Kingdom: Animalia
- Phylum: Arthropoda
- Class: Malacostraca
- Order: Amphipoda
- Family: Pontogammaridae
- Genus: †Praegmelina; Derjavin, 1927

Extinct genus of crustaceans

Praegmelina is an extinct genus of crustacean in the order Amphipoda. It existed during the middle Miocene period.
