= Neoniphargus =

Scientific classification
- Domain: Eukaryota
- Kingdom: Animalia
- Phylum: Arthropoda
- Class: Malacostraca
- Order: Amphipoda
- Family: Neoniphargidae
- Genus: Neoniphargus; Stebbing, 1897

Species
- Neoniphargus alpinus G.W. Smith, 1909; Neoniphargus coolemanensis Bradbury & Williams, 1997; Neoniphargus exiguus G.W. Smith, 1909; Neoniphargus fultoni Sayce, 1902; Neoniphargus richardi Bradbury & Williams, 1997; Neoniphargus secus Bradbury & Williams, 1997; Neoniphargus spenceri Sayce, 1901

Genus of amphipod

Neoniphargus is a genus of freshwater amphipod crustacean. It is the type genus of the family Neoniphargidae. It is found in the Australian states of Victoria and Tasmania and is threatened by climate change due to its restricted distribution.
