= Ceinidae =

Scientific classification
- Kingdom: Animalia
- Phylum: Arthropoda
- Clade: Pancrustacea
- Class: Malacostraca
- Order: Amphipoda
- Parvorder: Talitridira
- Superfamily: Hyaloidea
- Family: Ceinidae; J. L. Barnard, 1972

Genera
- Ceina Della Valle, 1893; Taihape J. L. Barnard, 1972; Waitomo J. L. Barnard, 1972

Family of crustaceans

Ceinidae is a family of amphipods. Until 1972, they were considered part of the family Phliantidae. Some genera previously included in this family have been transferred to the family Hyalidae.
