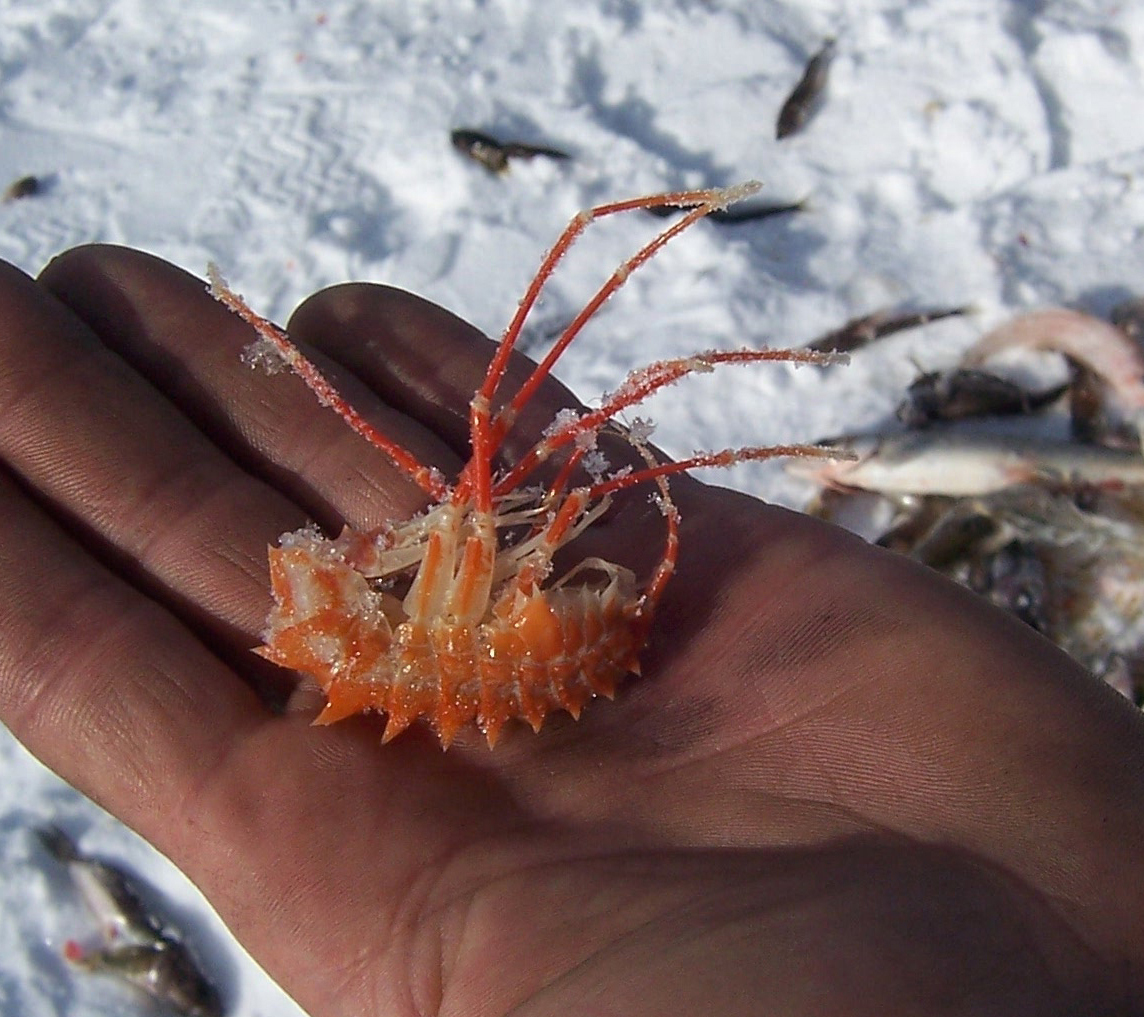
- Brachyuropus reicherti

Scientific classification
- Kingdom: Animalia
- Phylum: Arthropoda
- Class: Malacostraca
- Order: Amphipoda
- Suborder: Senticaudata
- Infraorder: Gammarida
- Parvorder: Gammaridira
- Superfamily: Gammaroidea
- Family: Acanthogammaridae; Garjajeff, 1901

= Acanthogammaridae =

Family of crustaceans

Acanthogammaridae is a family of amphipod crustaceans, endemic to Lake Baikal. It contains the following subfamilies and genera:

Acanthogammarinae Garjajeff, 1901

- Acanthogammarus Stebbing, 1899
- Boeckaxelia Schellenberg, 1940
- Brachyuropus Stebbing, 1899
- Brandtia Bate, 1862
- Carinurus Sowinsky, 1915
- Cheirogammarus Sowinsky, 1915
- Coniurus Sowinsky, 1915
- Cornugammarus Kamaltynov, 2001
- Dedyuola Kamaltynov, 2001
- Diplacanthus Kamaltynov, 2001
- Dorogammarus Bazikalova, 1945
- Dorogostaiskia Kamaltynov, 2001
- Eucarinogammarus Sowinsky, 1915
- Issykogammarus Chevreux, 1908
- Metapallasea Bazikalova, 1959
- Oxyacanthus Kamaltynov, 2001

Carinogammarinae Tachteew, 2000

- Aspretus Kamaltynov, 2001
- Asprogammarus Bazikalova, 1975
- Carinogammarus Stebbing, 1899
- Echiuropus Sowinsky, 1915
- Eremogammarus Kamaltynov, 2001
- Pseudomicruropus Bazikalova, 1961
- Smaragdogammarus Bazikalova, 1975

Hyalellopsinae Kamaltynov, 1999

- Gammarosphaera Bazikalova, 1936
- Hyalellopsis Stebbing, 1899

Parapallaseinae Kamaltynov, 1999

- Ceratogammarus Sowinsky, 1915
- Palicarcinus Barnard & Barnard, 1983
- Parapallasea Stebbing, 1899

Plesiogammarinae Kamaltynov, 1999

- Garjajewia Sowinsky, 1915
- Koshovia Bazikalova, 1975
- Paragarjajewia Bazikalova, 1945
- Plesiogammarus Stebbing, 1899
- Sentogammarus Kamaltynov, 2001
- Supernogammarus Kamaltynov, 2001

Poekilogammarinae Kamaltynov, 1999

- Bathygammarus Bazikalova, 1945
- Gymnogammarus Sowinsky, 1915
- Inobsequentus Takhteev, 2000
- Nyctoporea Kamaltynov, 2001
- Onychogammarus Sowinsky, 1915
- Poekilogammarus Stebbing, 1899
- Rostrogammarus Bazikalova, 1945
