= Neoniphargidae =

Scientific classification
- Domain: Eukaryota
- Kingdom: Animalia
- Phylum: Arthropoda
- Class: Malacostraca
- Order: Amphipoda
- Suborder: Senticaudata
- Infraorder: Gammarida
- Parvorder: Crangonyctidira
- Superfamily: Crangonyctoidea
- Family: Neoniphargidae; Bousfield, 1977

Family of crustaceans

Neoniphargidae is a family of crustaceans belonging to the order Amphipoda.

Genera:

- Jasptorus Bradbury & Williams, 1997
- Neocrypta Bradbury & Williams, 1997
- Neoniphargus (type genus) Stebbing, 1899
- Tasniphargus Williams & Barnard, 1988
- Wesniphargus Williams & Barnard, 1988
- Wombeyanus Bradbury & Williams, 1997
- Yulia Williams & Barnard, 1988
