= Eophliantidae =

Scientific classification
- Kingdom: Animalia
- Phylum: Arthropoda
- Clade: Pancrustacea
- Class: Malacostraca
- Order: Amphipoda
- Parvorder: Talitridira
- Superfamily: Hyaloidea
- Family: Eophliantidae; Sheard, 1936

Family of crustaceans

Eophliantidae is a family of amphipods, containing the following genera:

- Bircenna Chilton, 1884
- Ceinina Stephensen, 1933
- Cylindryllioides Nichols, 1938
- Eophliantis Sheard, 1936
- Lignophliantis J. L. Barnard, 1969
- Wandelia Chevreux, 1906

They have a wide distribution in the world's oceans, and live among algae.
