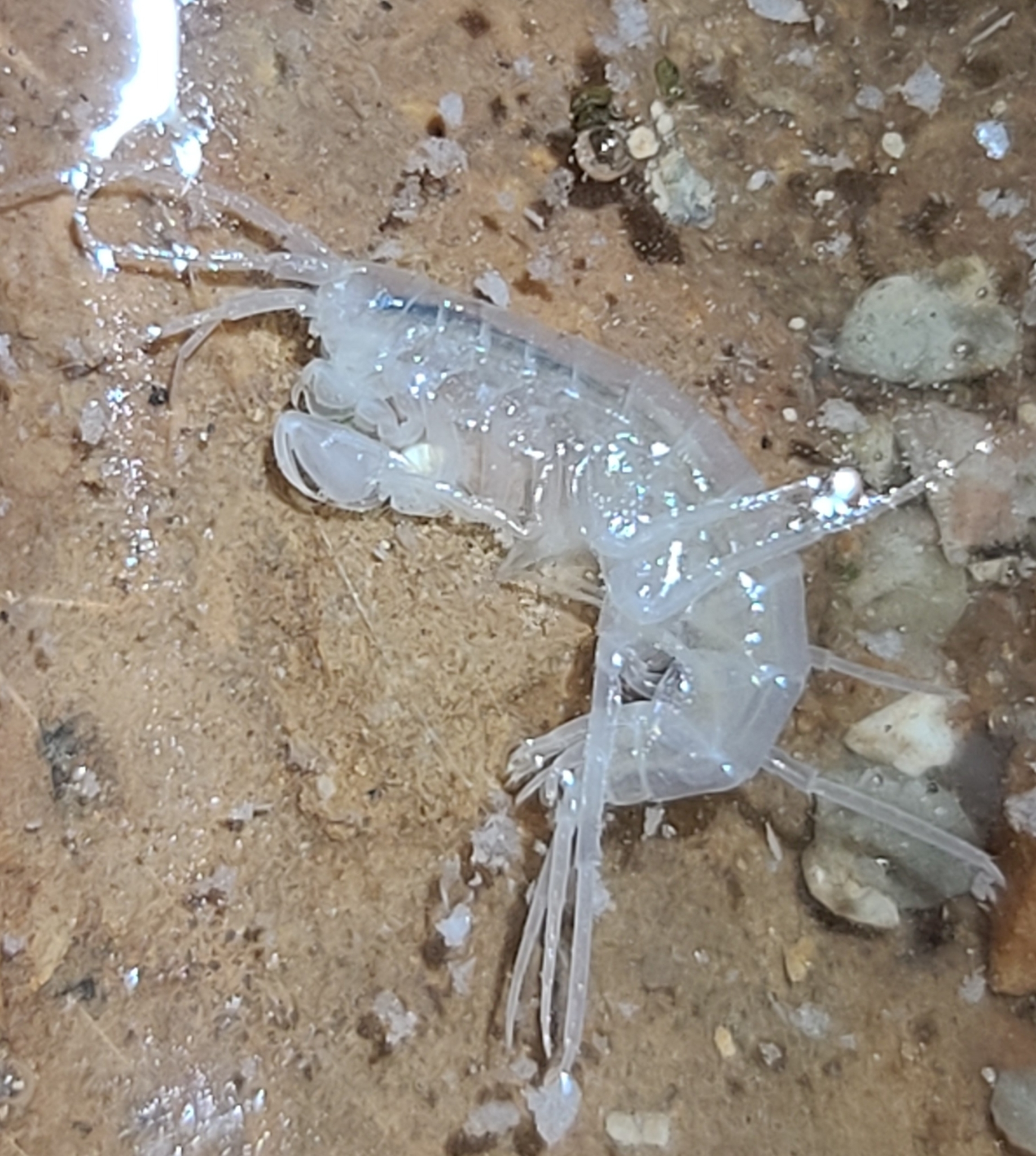

Scientific classification
- Kingdom: Animalia
- Phylum: Arthropoda
- Class: Malacostraca
- Order: Amphipoda
- Family: Allocrangonyctidae; Holsinger, 1989
- Genus: Allocrangonyx; Schellenberg, 1936

Species
- Allocrangonyx pellucidus (Mackin, 1935); Allocrangonyx hubrichti Holsinger, 1971

= Allocrangonyx =

Genus of crustaceans

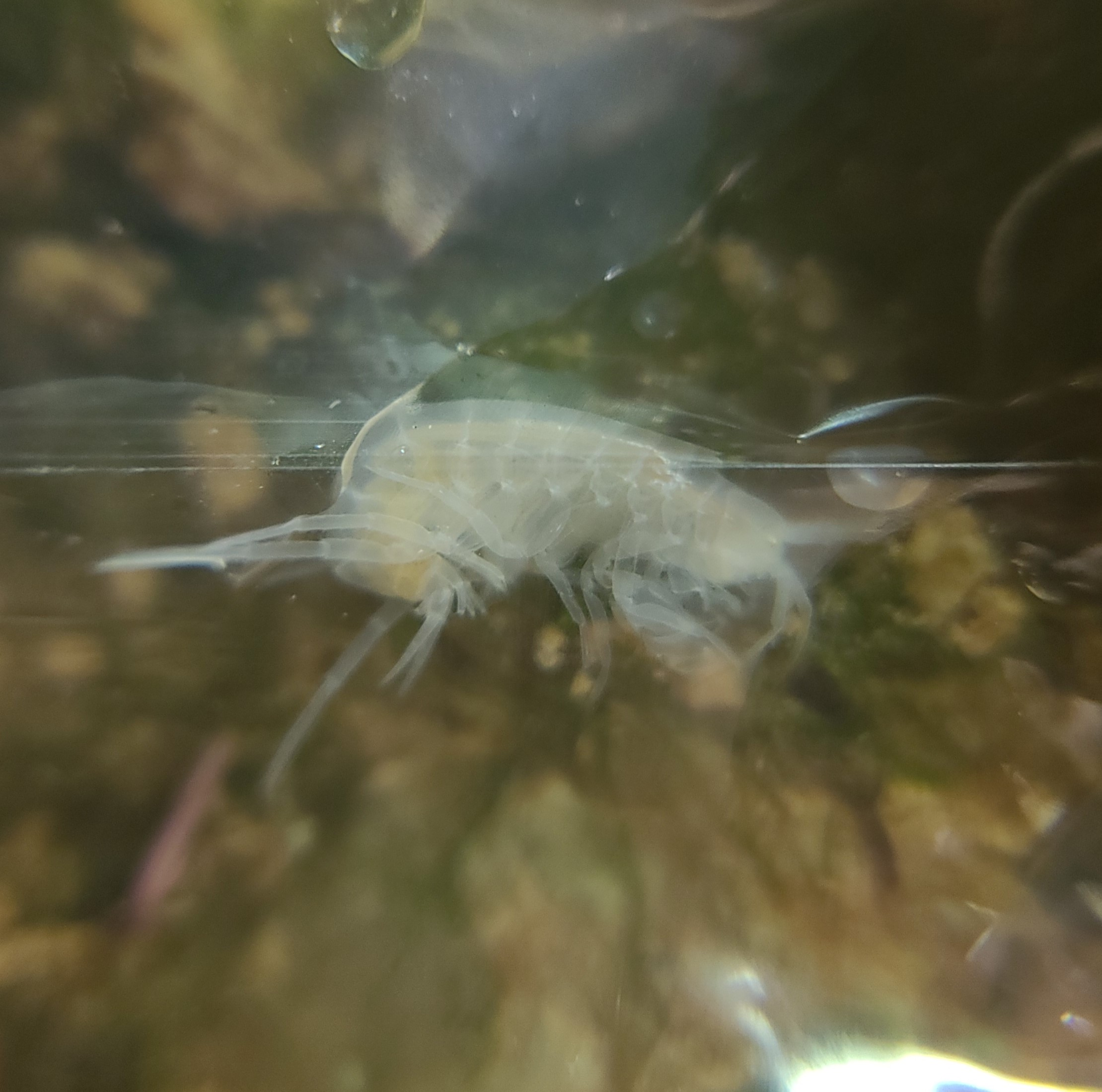
Allocrangonyx pellucidus (Oklahoma Cave Amphipod) in a cave spring in the Arbuckle mountains of Oklahoma.

Allocrangonyx is a genus of troglobitic amphipod crustaceans from the South Central United States. The two species are both listed as vulnerable on the IUCN Red List. The animals are blind and unpigmented. During the male's development, the outer ramus of the third uropod differentiates into secondary segments and grows to a length greater than the animal's body length.

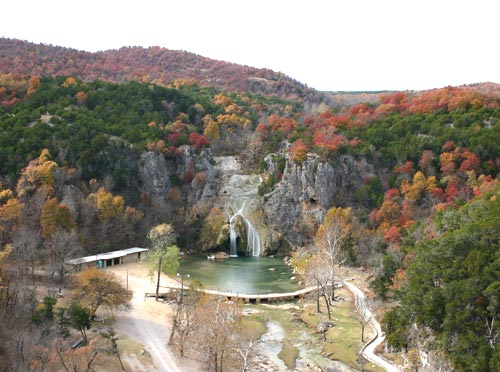
Allocrangonyx pellucidus lives in springs adjacent to Turner Falls.

== Allocrangonyx pellucidus ==
A. pellucidus, the "Oklahoma cave amphipod", is known from caves and springs in the Arbuckle Mountains of Johnston, Murray and Pontotoc counties, Oklahoma. The largest males reach 21.75 mm (0.856 in) long, while females reach 18 mm (0.71 in).

== Allocrangonyx hubrichti ==
A. hubrichti, the "Central Missouri cave amphipod" or "Hubricht's long-tailed amphipod", was thought for many years to be endemic to the state of Missouri, but specimens were discovered in 1996, 283 km (176 mi) away, in a water well near Romance, White County, Arkansas. While the well is drilled into Pennsylvanian age sandstone, all previous records have been from Ordovician limestones and dolomites.
