= Gammaroporeia =

Scientific classification
- Domain: Eukaryota
- Kingdom: Animalia
- Phylum: Arthropoda
- Class: Malacostraca
- Order: Amphipoda
- Family: Gammaroporeiidae
- Genus: Gammaroporeia; Bousfield, 1979
- Species: G. alaskensis

Binomial name
- Gammaroporeia alaskensis (Bousfield & Hubbard, 1968)

Genus of crustaceans

Gammaroporeia is a monotypic genus of crustaceans belonging to the monotypic family Gammaroporeiidae. The only species is Gammaroporeia alaskensis.

The species is found in Western America.
