= Kuriidae =

Scientific classification
- Domain: Eukaryota
- Kingdom: Animalia
- Phylum: Arthropoda
- Class: Malacostraca
- Order: Amphipoda
- Superfamily: Kurioidea
- Family: Kuriidae

Family of crustaceans

Kuriidae is a family of crustaceans belonging to the order Amphipoda.

Genera:

- Kuria Walker & Scott, 1903
- Micropythia Krapp-Schickel, 1976
