= Paracrangonyx =

Scientific classification
- Kingdom: Animalia
- Phylum: Arthropoda
- Clade: Pancrustacea
- Class: Malacostraca
- Order: Amphipoda
- Parvorder: Crangonyctidira
- Superfamily: Crangonyctoidea
- Family: Paracrangonyctidae; Bousfield, 1983
- Genus: Paracrangonyx; Stebbing, 1899

Species
- Paracrangonyx compactus Chilton, 1882; Paracrangonyx winterbourni Fenwick, 2001

Genus of crustaceans

Paracrangonyx is a genus of amphipods in the family Paracrangonyctidae, comprising two species, Paracrangonyx compactus and Paracrangonyz winterbourni.

P. compactus is found only in Canterbury, New Zealand, at Eyreton, Leeston, and St Albans. It is hypogean, found up to 58 metres (190 ft) below ground.

P. winterbourni has only been found at Templeton, on the Canterbury Plains of South Island.
