= Sternophysinx =

Scientific classification
- Domain: Eukaryota
- Kingdom: Animalia
- Phylum: Arthropoda
- Class: Malacostraca
- Order: Amphipoda
- Family: Sternophysingidae
- Genus: Sternophysinx; Holsinger & Straškraba, 1973

Genus of crustaceans

Sternophysinx is a genus of crustaceans belonging to the monotypic family Sternophysingidae.

The species of this genus are found in Southern Africa.

Species:

- Sternophysinx alca Griffiths, 1981
- Sternophysinx basilobata Griffiths, 1991
- Sternophysinx calceola Holsinger, 1992
- Sternophysinx filaris Holsinger & Straškraba, 1973
- Sternophysinx hibernica Griffiths, 1991
- Sternophysinx megacheles Griffiths & Stewart, 1996
- Sternophysinx robertsi (Methuen, 1911)
- Sternophysinx transvaalensis Holsinger & Straškraba, 1973
