= Tulearus =

Scientific classification
- Domain: Eukaryota
- Kingdom: Animalia
- Phylum: Arthropoda
- Class: Malacostraca
- Order: Amphipoda
- Family: Tulearidae
- Genus: Tulearus; Ledoyer, 1979
- Species: T. thomassini

Binomial name
- Tulearus thomassini Ledoyer, 1979

Genus of Malacostraca

Tulearus is a monotypic genus of crustaceans belonging to the monotypic family Tulearidae. The only species is Tulearus thomassini. The genus and species were first described in 1979 by Michel Ledoyer.
