= Metacrangonyctidae =

Scientific classification
- Domain: Eukaryota
- Kingdom: Animalia
- Phylum: Arthropoda
- Class: Malacostraca
- Order: Amphipoda
- Superfamily: Hadzioidea
- Family: Metacrangonyctidae

Family of crustaceans

Metacrangonyctidae is a family of crustaceans belonging to the order Amphipoda.

Genera:

- Longipodacrangonyx Boutin & Messouli, 1988
- Metacrangonyx Boutin & Messouli, 1988
- Metacrangonyx Chevreux, 1909
