= Pseudocrangonyctidae =

Scientific classification
- Domain: Eukaryota
- Kingdom: Animalia
- Phylum: Arthropoda
- Class: Malacostraca
- Order: Amphipoda
- Superfamily: Crangonyctoidea
- Family: Pseudocrangonyctidae

Family of crustaceans

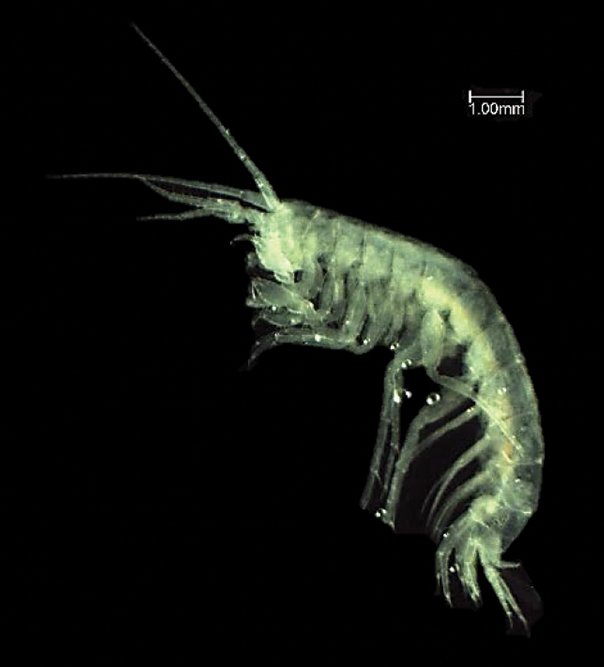
Pseudocrangonyx akatsukai (10.3897-subtbiol.32.35031) Figure 4 (cropped)

Pseudocrangonyctidae is a family of crustaceans belonging to the order Amphipoda.

Genera:

- Procrangonyx Schellenberg, 1934
- Pseudocrangonyx Akatsuka & Komai, 1922
