= Phliantidae =

Scientific classification
- Kingdom: Animalia
- Phylum: Arthropoda
- Clade: Pancrustacea
- Class: Malacostraca
- Order: Amphipoda
- Parvorder: Talitridira
- Superfamily: Hyaloidea
- Family: Phliantidae; Stebbing, 1899

Genera
- See text.

Family of crustaceans

Phliantidae is a family of isopod-like amphipod crustaceans chiefly from the southern hemisphere.

== Description ==
Members of the family Phliantidae are unusual among the order Amphipoda, because they have dorso-ventrally flattened bodies with a pronounced dorsal keel, rather than being flattened side-to-side. Because of this, and various other factors, including the square-ended form of the rostrum, they resemble isopods.

== Distribution and ecology ==
Most species are found in the Southern Hemisphere, where they live on algae in the intertidal zone.

== Taxonomy ==
Phliantidae was originally proposed by Thomas Roscoe Rede Stebbing in 1899 for a group that also contained the genera currently placed in the family Prophliantidae, while Temnophlias has also been moved from Phliantidae to its own monotypic families. It contains the following genera:

- Iphinotus Stebbing, 1899
- Palinnotus Stebbing, 1900
- Pariphinotus Kunkel, 1910
- Pereionotus Bate & Westwood, 1862
- Plioplateia Barnard, 1916
