= Najnidae =

Scientific classification
- Domain: Eukaryota
- Kingdom: Animalia
- Phylum: Arthropoda
- Class: Malacostraca
- Order: Amphipoda
- Superfamily: Hyaloidea
- Family: Najnidae

Family of crustaceans

Najnidae is a family of crustaceans belonging to the order Amphipoda.

Genera:

- Carinonajna Bousfield & Marcoux, 2004
- Najna Derzhavin, 1937
