= Perthia =

Scientific classification
- Domain: Eukaryota
- Kingdom: Animalia
- Phylum: Arthropoda
- Class: Malacostraca
- Order: Amphipoda
- Family: Perthiidae
- Genus: Perthia; Straškraba, 1964

Genus of crustaceans

Perthia is a genus of crustaceans belonging to the monotypic family Perthiidae.

The species of this genus are found in Southern Australia.

Species:

- Perthia acutitelson Straskraba, 1964
- Perthia branchialis (Nicholls, 1924)
