= Cheluridae =

Scientific classification
- Kingdom: Animalia
- Phylum: Arthropoda
- Clade: Pancrustacea
- Class: Malacostraca
- Order: Amphipoda
- Parvorder: Corophiidira
- Superfamily: Cheluroidea
- Family: Cheluridae; Allman, 1847

Genera
- See text

Family of crustaceans

Cheluridae is a family of amphipods. It is the only family classified under the superfamily Cheluroidea.

At least three genera are included:

- Chelura Phillippi, 1839
- Nippochelura Barnard, 1959
- Tropichelura Barnard, 1959
