= Gmelinoides =

Scientific classification
- Domain: Eukaryota
- Kingdom: Animalia
- Phylum: Arthropoda
- Class: Malacostraca
- Order: Amphipoda
- Family: Micruropodidae
- Subfamily: Gmelinoidinae; Kamaltynov, 2002
- Genus: Gmelinoides; Bazikalova, 1945

Genus of crustaceans

Gmelinoides is a genus of freshwater amphipod crustaceans of the family Micruropodidae.

The genus is native to Siberia and makes part of the Lake Baikal amphipod radiation, but has also been introduced to Europe.

== Species ==
- Gmelinoides fasciatoides (Gurjanova, 1929)
- Gmelinoides fasciatus (Stebbing, 1899)
