= Richard Elmhirst =

English cricketer

Richard Elmhirst (18 September 1803 – 18 November 1859) was an English cricketer. He is recorded as a batsman in one match for Cambridge University in 1822, when he scored one run.

Elmhirst was educated at Doncaster School (now Hall Cross Academy) and Caius College, Cambridge. After graduating he became a physician at Lincoln.

== Bibliography ==
- Haygarth, Arthur (1996) [1862]. Scores & Biographies, Volume 1 (1744–1826). Kennington: Frederick Lillywhite. ISBN 978-19-00592-23-9.
- Haygarth, Arthur (1997) [1862]. Scores & Biographies, Volume 2 (1827–1840). Kennington: Frederick Lillywhite. ISBN 978-19-00592-23-9.
