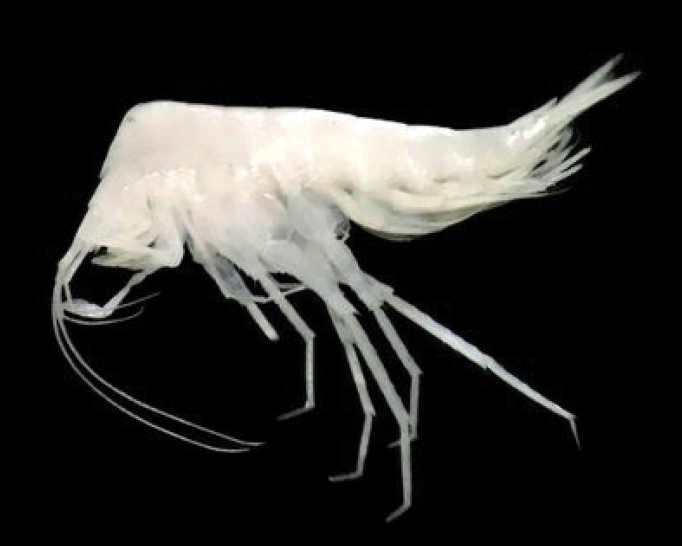
- Tuluweckelia cernua

Scientific classification
- Kingdom: Animalia
- Phylum: Arthropoda
- Clade: Pancrustacea
- Class: Malacostraca
- Order: Amphipoda
- Parvorder: Hadziidira
- Superfamily: Hadzioidea
- Family: Hadziidae; Karaman, 1943

= Hadziidae =

Family of crustaceans

Hadziidae is a family of amphipods, which are difficult to distinguish from the related family Melitidae. It contains the following genera:

- Allotexiweckelia Holsinger, 1980
- Apoweckelia Stock, 1985
- Bahadzia Holsinger, 1985
- Dulzura J.L. Barnard, 1969
- Fiha Stock, 1988
- Fingerhadzia G. Karaman, 2024
- Fluviadulzura Myers, Lowry & Billingham, 2017
- Hadzia S. Karaman, 1932
- Holsingerius Barnard & Karaman, 1982
- Indoweckelia Holsinger & Ruffo, 2002
- Mayaweckelia Holsinger, 1977
- Metahadzia Stock, 1977
- Metaniphargus Stephensen, 1933
- Mexiweckelia Holsinger & Minckley, 1971
- Paraholsingerius Sawicki & Holsinger, 2005
- Paramexiweckelia Holsinger, 1981
- Paraweckelia Shoemaker, 1959
- Parhadzia Vigna Taglianti, 1988
- Phreatomelita Ruffo, 1979
- Psammoniphargus Ruffo, 1956
- Radaweckelia Stock, 1985
- Saliweckelia Stock, 1977
- Tamaweckelia Sawicki & Holsinger, 2005
- Texiweckelia Holsinger, 1980
- Texiweckeliopsis Barnard & Karaman, 1982
- Tuluweckelia Holsinger, 1990
- Weckelia Shoemaker, 1942
- Zhadia Lowry & Fenwick, 1983
- Zombiweckelia Stock, 1985
