= Carangoliopsis =

Scientific classification
- Domain: Eukaryota
- Kingdom: Animalia
- Phylum: Arthropoda
- Class: Malacostraca
- Order: Amphipoda
- Family: Carangoliopsidae
- Genus: Carangoliopsis; Ledoyer, 1970
- Species: C. spinulosa

Binomial name
- Carangoliopsis spinulosa Ledoyer, 1970

Genus of crustaceans

Carangoliopsis is a monotypic genus of crustaceans belonging to the monotypic family Carangoliopsidae. The only species is Carangoliopsis spinulosa.

The species is found in Mediterranean. The genus and the species were first described in 1970 by Michel Ledoyer.
