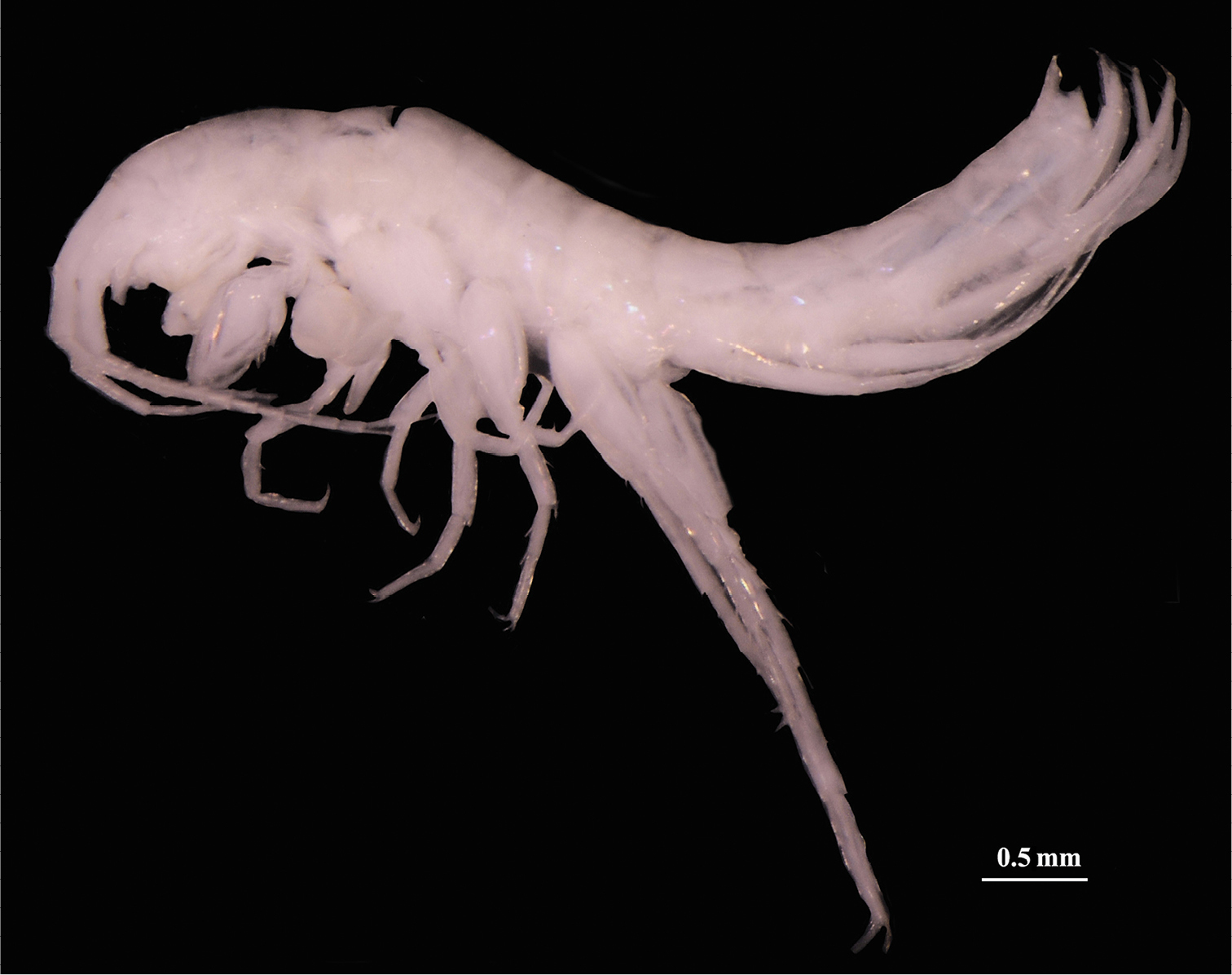
- Bogidiella pingxiangensis

Scientific classification
- Kingdom: Animalia
- Phylum: Arthropoda
- Clade: Pancrustacea
- Class: Malacostraca
- Order: Amphipoda
- Family: Bogidiellidae
- Genus: Bogidiella; Hertzog, 1933

Type species
- Bogidiella albertimagni Hertzog, 1933

Synonyms
- Jugocrangonyx S. Karaman, 1933

= Bogidiella =

Genus of crustaceans

Bogidiella is a genus of crustacean in the family Bogidiellidae, containing the following species:

- Bogidiella albertimagni Hertzog, 1933
- Bogidiella antennata Stock & Notenboom, 1988
- Bogidiella aprutina Pesce, 1980
- Bogidiella aquatica G. Karaman, 1990
- Bogidiella arganoi Ruffo & Vigna-taglianti, 1974
- Bogidiella arista Koenemann, Vonk & Schram, 1998
- Bogidiella atlantica Sànchez, 1991
- Bogidiella balearica Dancau, 1973
- Bogidiella barbaria G. Karaman, 1990
- Bogidiella broodbakkeri Stock, 1992
- Bogidiella calicali G. Karaman, 1988
- Bogidiella capia G. Karaman, 1988
- Bogidiella cerberus Bou & Ruffo, 1979
- Bogidiella chappuisi Ruffo, 1952
- Bogidiella chitalensis G. Karaman, 1981
- Bogidiella coipana Ortiz, Winfield & Lalana, 2001
- Bogidiella convexa Stock & Notenboom, 1988
- Bogidiella cooki Grosso & Ringuelet, 1979
- Bogidiella cypria G. Karaman, 1989
- Bogidiella cyrnensis Hovenkamp, Hovenkamp & Van der Heide, 1983
- Bogidiella dalmatina S. Karaman, 1953
- Bogidiella deharvengi Stock & Botosaneanu, 1989
- Bogidiella gammariformis Sket, 1985
- Bogidiella glabra Stock & Notenboom, 1988
- Bogidiella glacialis G. Karaman, 2002
- Bogidiella hamatula Stock, 1985
- Bogidiella helenae Mateus & Maciel, 1967
- Bogidiella hispanica Stock & Notenboom, 1988
- Bogidiella indica Holsinger, Reddy & Messouli, 2006
- Bogidiella isajii Ugomeki, Yoshimura & Tomikawa in Tomikawa, Yoshimura, Ugomeki & Shimomura, 2026
- Bogidiella ischnusae Ruffo & Vigna Taglianti, 1975
- Bogidiella lindbergi Ruffo, 1958
- Bogidiella longiflagellum S. Karaman, 1959
- Bogidiella madeirae Stock, 1994
- Bogidiella mexicana G. Karaman, 1981
- Bogidiella michaelae Ruffo & Vigna-Taglianti, 1977
- Bogidiella minotaurus Ruffo & Schiecke, 1976
- Bogidiella neotropica Ruffo, 1952
- Bogidiella nicolae G. Karaman, 1988
- Bogidiella niphargoides Ruffo & Vigna-Taglianti, 1977
- Bogidiella painushima Ugomeki, Yoshimura & Tomikawa in Tomikawa, Yoshimura, Ugomeki & Shimomura, 2026
- Bogidiella paolii Hovenkamp, Hovenkamp & Van der Heide, 1983
- Bogidiella paraichnusae G. Karaman, 1979
- Bogidiella perla Stock, 1981
- Bogidiella prionura Stock, 1985
- Bogidiella purpuriae Stock, 1988
- Bogidiella ringueleti Grosso & Fernandez, 1988
- Bogidiella ruffoi Birstein & Ljovuschkin, 1967
- Bogidiella sbordonii Ruffo & Vigna-Taglianti, 1974
- Bogidiella semidenticulata Meštrov, 1962
- Bogidiella serbica G. Karaman, 1988
- Bogidiella silverii Pesce, 1981
- Bogidiella sinica Karaman & Sket, 1990
- Bogidiella sketi G. Karaman, 1989
- Bogidiella skoplgensis (S. Karaman, 1933)
- Bogidiella spathulata Stock & Rondé-Broekhuizen, 1987
- Bogidiella stocki G. Karaman, 1990
- Bogidiella talampuyensis Grosso & Glaps, 1985
- Bogidiella thai Botosaneanu & Notenboom, 1988
- Bogidiella torrenticola Pretus & Stock, 1990
- Bogidiella turcica Vonk, Seveso & Noteboom, 1999
- Bogidiella uncinata Stock & Notenboom, 1988
- Bogidiella uniramosa Stock & Rondé-Broekhuizen, 1987
- Bogidiella vandeli Coineau, 1968
- Bogidiella virginalis Stock, 1981
- Bogidiella vomeroi Ruffo & Vigna-Taglianti, 1977
