= Temnophliantidae =

Scientific classification
- Domain: Eukaryota
- Kingdom: Animalia
- Phylum: Arthropoda
- Class: Malacostraca
- Order: Amphipoda
- Superfamily: Hyaloidea
- Family: Temnophliantidae

Family of crustaceans

Temnophliantidae is a family of crustaceans belonging to the order Amphipoda.

Genera:

- Hystriphlias Barnard & Karaman, 1987
- Temnophlias Barnard, 1916
