= Salentinellidae =

Scientific classification
- Domain: Eukaryota
- Kingdom: Animalia
- Phylum: Arthropoda
- Class: Malacostraca
- Order: Amphipoda
- Superfamily: Bogidielloidea
- Family: Salentinellidae

Family of crustaceans

Salentinellidae is a family of crustaceans belonging to the order Amphipoda.

Genera:

- Parasalentinella Bou, 1971
- Salentinella Ruffo, 1947
