= Kamakidae =

Scientific classification
- Kingdom: Animalia
- Phylum: Arthropoda
- Clade: Pancrustacea
- Class: Malacostraca
- Order: Amphipoda
- Superfamily: Photoidea
- Family: Kamakidae

Family of crustaceans

Kamakidae is a crustacean family of amphipods belonging to the order Amphipoda.

Genera:

- Aloiloi J.L.Barnard, 1970
- Amphideutopus J.L.Barnard, 1959
- Aorcho J.L.Barnard, 1961
- Aorchoides Ledoyer, 1972
- Cerapopsis Della Valle, 1893
- Gammaropsella Myers, 1995
- Heterokamaka Ariyama, 2008
- Kamaka Derzhavin, 1923
- Ledoyerella Myers, 1973
- Natarajphotis Peethambaran, 1998
- Paraloiloi Myers, 1995
