= Unciolidae =

Scientific classification
- Domain: Eukaryota
- Kingdom: Animalia
- Phylum: Arthropoda
- Class: Malacostraca
- Order: Amphipoda
- Superfamily: Aoroidea
- Family: Unciolidae; Myers & Lowry, 2003

Family of crustaceans

Unciolidae is a family of crustaceans in the order Amphipoda. There are about 9 genera and more than 20 described species in Unciolidae.

== Genera ==
These nine genera belong to the family Unciolidae:

- Dryopoides Stebbing, 1888
- Janice Griffiths, 1973
- Klebang Azman & Othman, 2012
- Orstomia Myers, 1998
- Ritaumius Ledoyer, 1978
- Uncinotarsus L'Hardy & Truchot, 1964
- Unciola Say, 1818
- Wombalano Thomas & Barnard, 1991
- Zoedeutopus J.L.Barnard, 1979
