= Plioplateia =

Scientific classification
- Domain: Eukaryota
- Kingdom: Animalia
- Phylum: Arthropoda
- Class: Malacostraca
- Order: Amphipoda
- Family: Plioplateidae
- Genus: Plioplateia; Barnard, 1916

Genus of crustaceans

Plioplateia is a genus of crustaceans belonging to the monotypic family Plioplateidae.

The species of this genus are found in South African Republic.

Species:

- Plioplateia nodiformis Ledoyer, 1986
- Plioplateia triquetra Barnard, 1916
