= Artesiidae =

Scientific classification
- Domain: Eukaryota
- Kingdom: Animalia
- Phylum: Arthropoda
- Class: Malacostraca
- Order: Amphipoda
- Superfamily: Bogidielloidea
- Family: Artesiidae

Family of crustaceans

Artesiidae is a family of crustaceans belonging to the order Amphipoda.

Genera:

- Artesia Holsinger, 1980
- Spelaeogammarus da Silva Brum, 1975
