= Priscomilitaridae =

Scientific classification
- Domain: Eukaryota
- Kingdom: Animalia
- Phylum: Arthropoda
- Class: Malacostraca
- Order: Amphipoda
- Superfamily: Neomegamphoidea
- Family: Priscomilitaridae

Family of crustaceans

Priscomilitaridae is a family of crustaceans belonging to the order Amphipoda.

Genera:

- Paraphotis Ren, 1997
- Priscomilitaris Hirayama, 1988
