= Caprogammarus =

Scientific classification
- Domain: Eukaryota
- Kingdom: Animalia
- Phylum: Arthropoda
- Class: Malacostraca
- Order: Amphipoda
- Family: Caprogammaridae
- Genus: Caprogammarus; Kudrjaschov & Vassilenko, 1966

Genus of amphipods

Caprogammarus is a genus of amphipods belonging to the monotypic family Caprogammaridae.

Species:

- Caprogammarus gurjanove Kudrjaschov & Vassilenko, 1966
- Caprogammarus micropleopodus Vassilenko, 1977
