= Paragammaropsidae =

Scientific classification
- Domain: Eukaryota
- Kingdom: Animalia
- Phylum: Arthropoda
- Class: Malacostraca
- Order: Amphipoda
- Superfamily: Aetiopedesoidea
- Family: Paragammaropsidae

Family of crustaceans

Paragammaropsidae is a family of amphipods belonging to the order Amphipoda.

Genera:

- Paragammaropsis Ren, 1991
- Stebbingiella Marques-Junior & Senna, 2013
