= Neomegamphopidae =

Scientific classification
- Kingdom: Animalia
- Phylum: Arthropoda
- Clade: Pancrustacea
- Class: Malacostraca
- Order: Amphipoda
- Superfamily: Neomegamphoidea
- Family: Neomegamphopidae; Myers, 1981

Genera
- See text.

Family of crustaceans

Neomegamphopidae is a family of amphipods, comprising the two genera Maragopsis and Neomegamphopus. A third genus, Komatopus, may be a synonym of Magaropsis.
