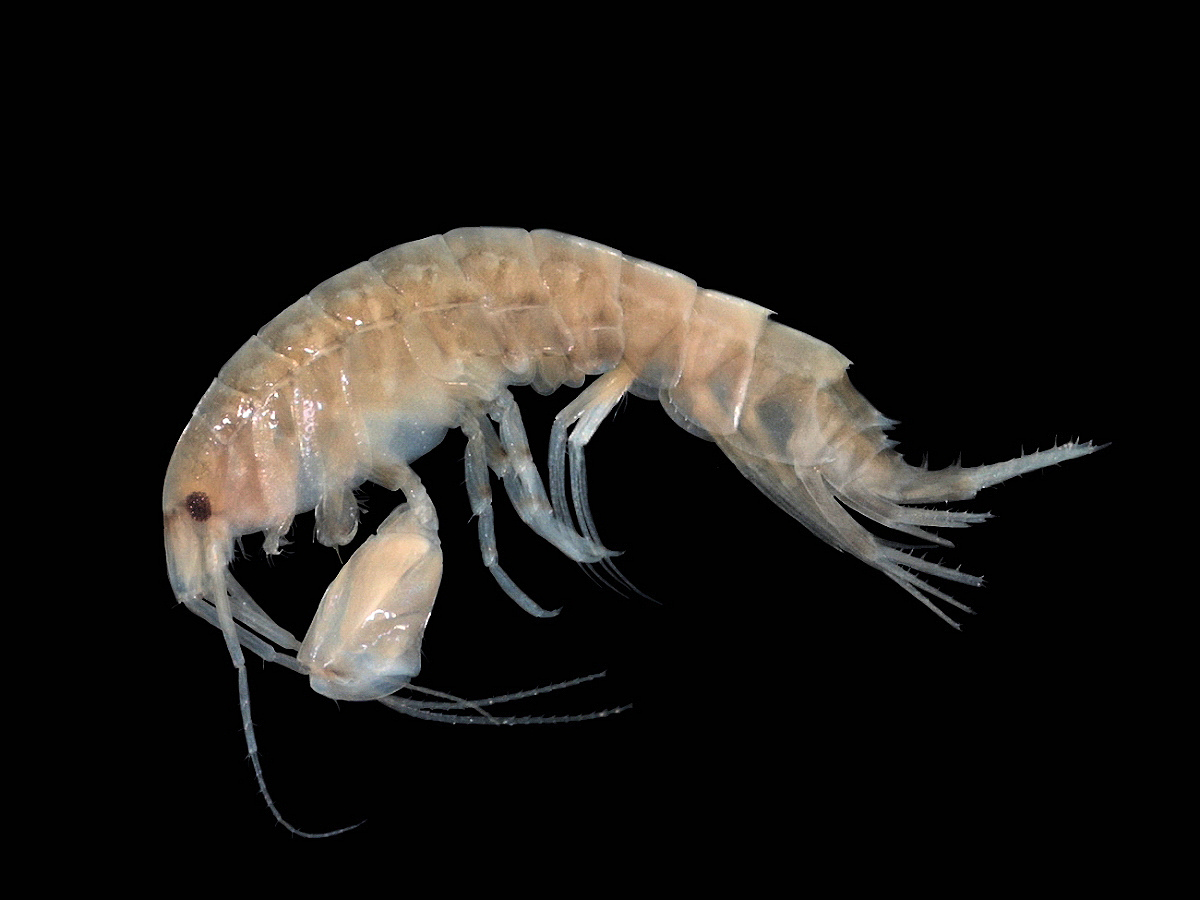
- Abludomelita obtusata
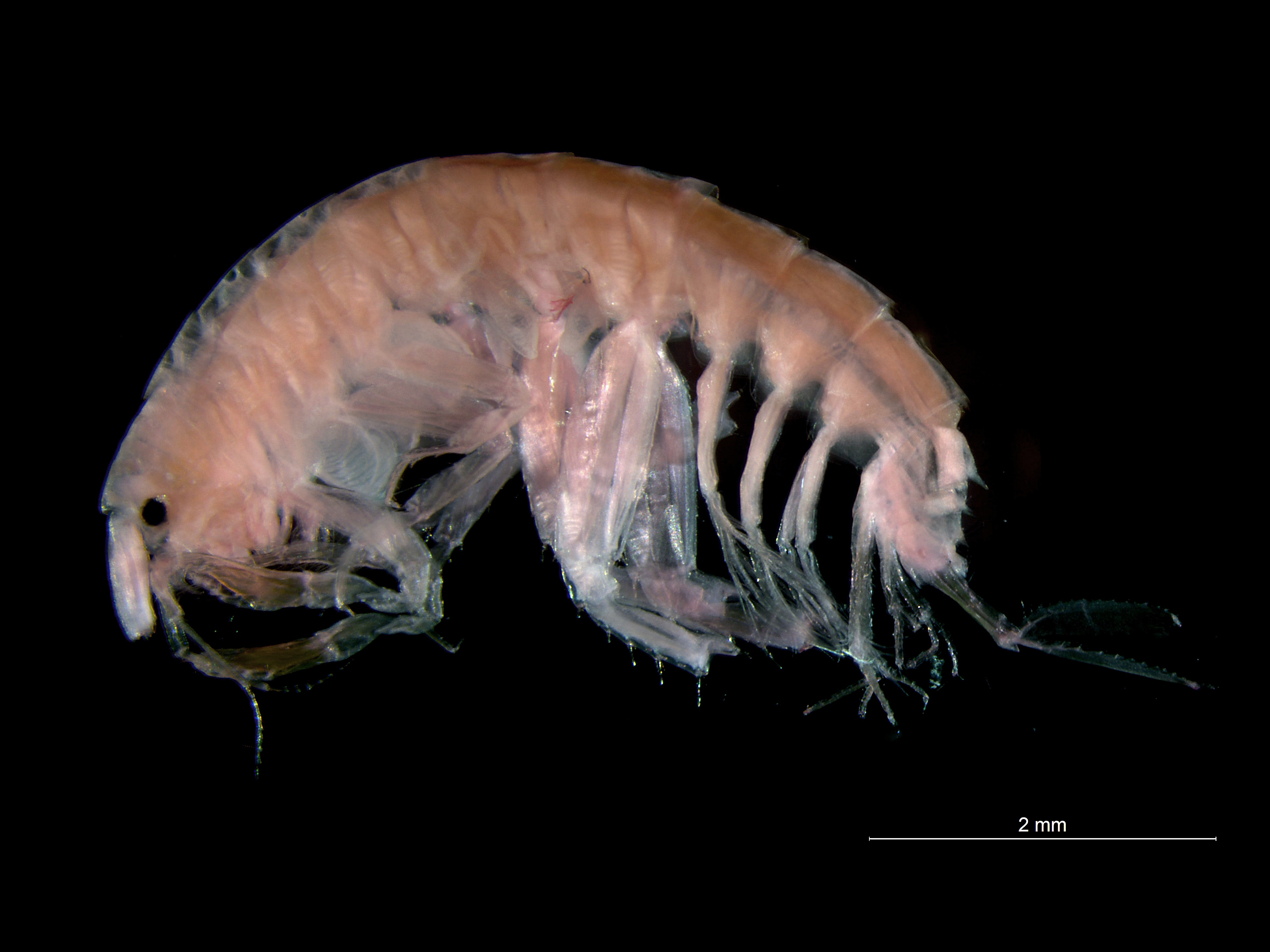
- Maerella tenuimana

Scientific classification
- Kingdom: Animalia
- Phylum: Arthropoda
- Clade: Pancrustacea
- Class: Malacostraca
- Order: Amphipoda
- Parvorder: Hadziidira
- Superfamily: Hadzioidea
- Family: Melitidae; Bousfield, 1973

Genera
- See text

= Melitidae =

Family of crustaceans

Melitidae is a family of amphipods. It contains around 45 genera, and formerly included a further 40 genera that are now placed in the family Maeridae.

== Genera ==
- Abludomelita
- Allomelita
- Alsacomelita
- Anchialella
- Brachina
- Caledopisa
- Carinomelita
- Cottarellia
- Cottesloe
- Desdimelita
- Dulichiella
- Eriopisa
- Eriopisella
- Gammarella
- Hornellia
- Indoniphargus
- Jerbarnia
- Josephosella
- Maerella
- Mallacoota
- Megamoera
- Melita
- Metaceradocus
- Netamelita
- Nurina
- Nuuanu
- Parapherusa
- Psammogammarus
- Psammomelita
- Rotomelita
- Tabatzius
- Tagua
- Valettiella
- Verdeia
- Victoriopisa
