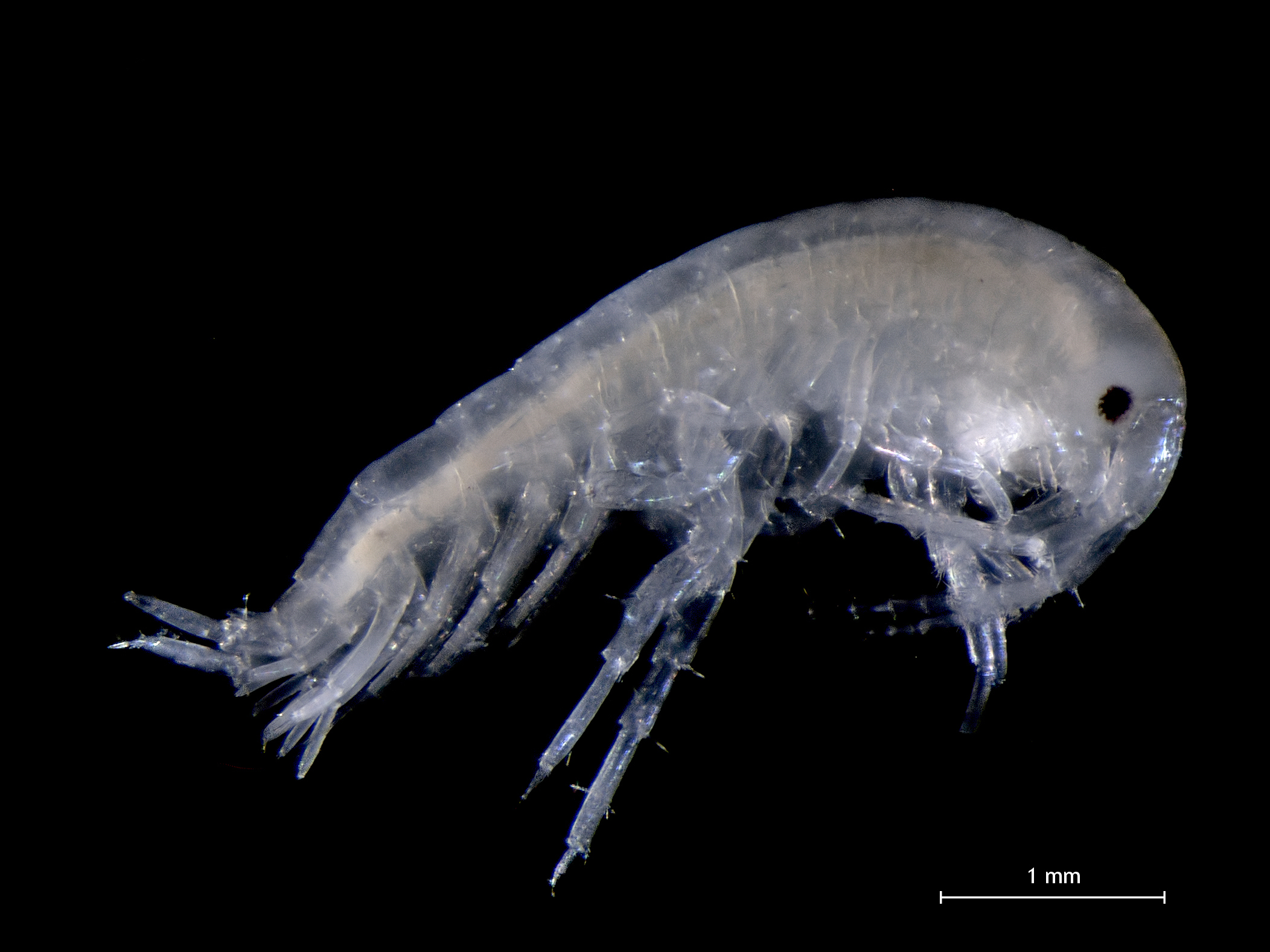
- Aora gracilis

Scientific classification
- Kingdom: Animalia
- Phylum: Arthropoda
- Clade: Pancrustacea
- Class: Malacostraca
- Order: Amphipoda
- Superfamily: Aoroidea
- Family: Aoridae

= Aoridae =

Family of crustaceans

Aoridae is a family of amphipods belonging to the order Amphipoda.

== Genera ==
Aoridae contains the following genera:

- Aora Krøyer, 1845
- Aorella Myers, 1981
- Aoroides Walker, 1898
- Archaeobemlos Myers, 1988
- Arctolembos Myers, 1979
- Australomicrodeutopus Myers, 1988
- Autonoe Bruzelius, 1859
- Bemlos Shoemaker, 1925
- Camacho Stebbing, 1888
- Chevreuxius Bonnier, 1896
- Columbaora Conlan & Bousfield, 1982
- Globosolembos Myers, 1985
- Grandidierella Coutière, 1904
- Janice Griffiths, 1973
- Lemboides Stebbing, 1895
- Lembos Spence Bate, 1857
- Meridiolembos Myers, 1988
- Microdeutopus A. Costa, 1853
- Myersella Alves, Nogueira, Neves & Johnsson, 2023
- Paragrandidierella Ariyama, 2002
- Paramicrodeutopus Myers, 1988
- Paraoroides Stebbing, 1910
- Plesiolembos Myers, 1988
- Protolembos Myers, 1988
- Pseudobemlos Ariyama, 2004
- Tethylembos Myers, 1988
- Xenocheira Haswell, 1879
