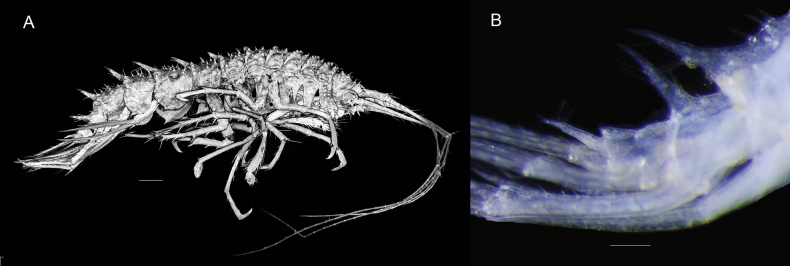
- Pseudolepechinella apricity holotype and paratype

Scientific classification
- Kingdom: Animalia
- Phylum: Arthropoda
- Clade: Pancrustacea
- Class: Malacostraca
- Order: Amphipoda
- Family: Lepechinellidae
- Genus: Pseudolepechinella; Horton & Lörz, 2026
- Species: P. apricity

Binomial name
- Pseudolepechinella apricity Horton & Lörz, 2026

= Pseudolepechinella =

Species of deep-sea crustacean

Pseudolepechinella is a monotypic genus of deep-water amphipod crustaceans. in the family Lepechinellidae. The genus was first described in 2026 by scientists Tammy Horton and Anne-Nina Lörz. The type and only species is Pseudolepechinella apricity. The species was described in 2026 from two specimens collected in the Clarion-Clipperton Zone. It was discovered along with 23 other species, including Mirabestia maisie and others.

== Description ==
Pseudolepechinella apricity is known from two immature specimens: the holotype, 6.8 mm, and the paratype, 7.2 mm. It is distinguished from the other 5 genera in its family by a rounded propodus of the gnathopods, an unusually short and broadened basis, and a distally expanded propodus and shortened robust dactyls of the pereopods.

== Range ==
The species is found in the Abyssal Pacific Ocean, in the Clarion-Clipperton Zone, at depths of 4097–4275 meters.

== Etymology ==
The genus name, Pseudolepechinella, references its close resemblance to genus Lepechinella, adding Greek pseudos (false). The species name, apricity, from Latin apricitas (the feeling of the warmth of the sun in winter), was chosen to represent the friendship shared between scientists in the winter at the workshop in Łódź, Poland, where the species was described, and also to represent the bringing of the specimens from deep in the ocean to above sea.
