= Ingolfiella rocaensis =

Scientific classification
- Domain: Eukaryota
- Kingdom: Animalia
- Phylum: Arthropoda
- Class: Malacostraca
- Order: Amphipoda
- Family: Ingolfiellidae
- Genus: Ingolfiella
- Species: I. rocaensis

Binomial name
- Ingolfiella rocaensis Senna & Serejo, 2005

Species of crustacean

Ingolfiella rocaensis is a species of amphipod within the family Ingolfiellidae. The species was described from a specimen obtained off washed sponges from the Rocas Atoll at a depth of 14 meters. The species is distinguished from others by a small slender seta on the endopod of uropod 1. It is also the first recorded species of the Ingolfiellidea suborder reported in Brazilian waters, as previous records of the Ingolfiellidea suborder show species ranging in waters in the South Atlantic off of South Africa and Argentina.
