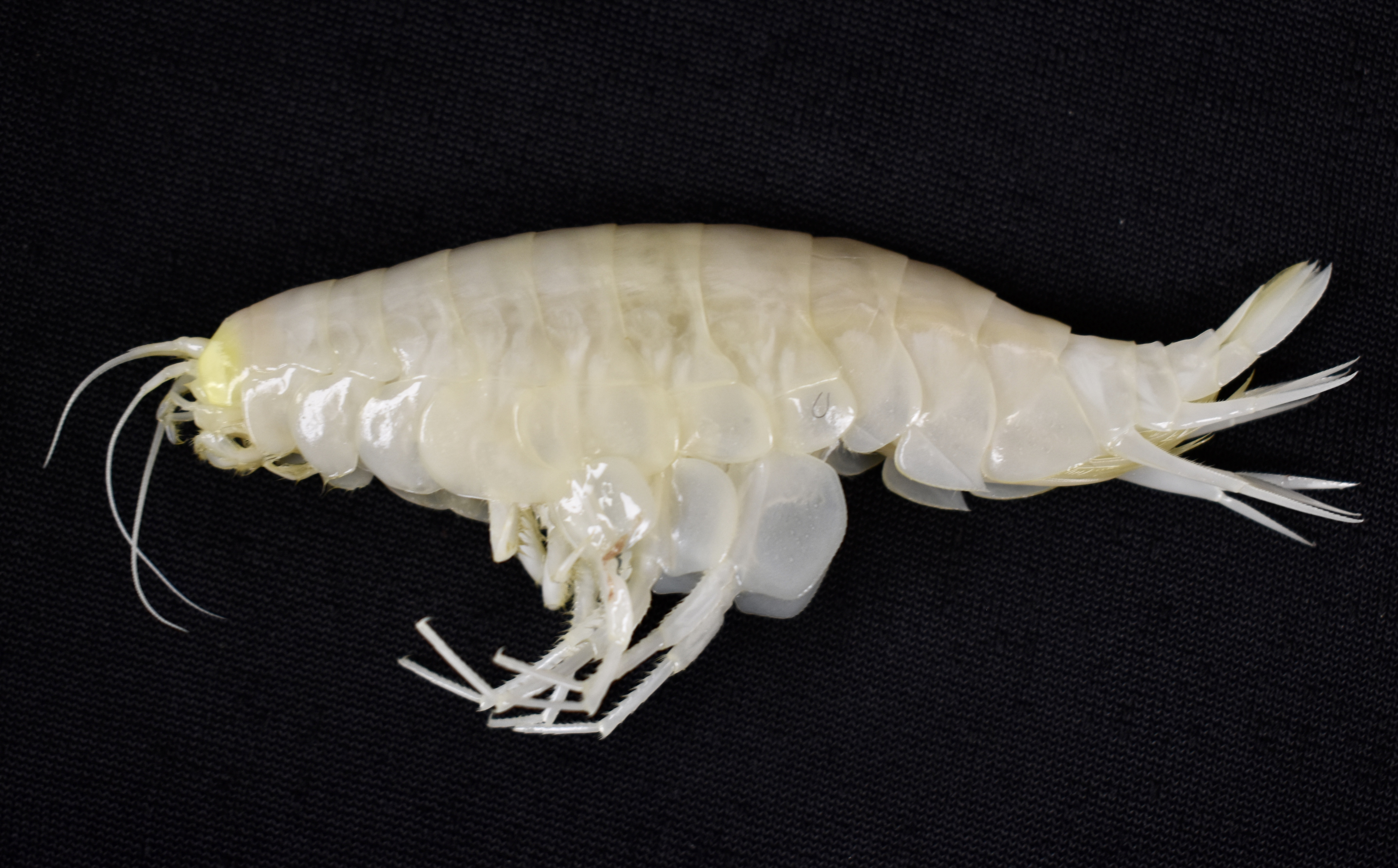
- Specimen collected from the Japan Trench in 2022

Scientific classification
- Kingdom: Animalia
- Phylum: Arthropoda
- Clade: Pancrustacea
- Class: Malacostraca
- Order: Amphipoda
- Parvorder: Lysianassidira
- Superfamily: Alicelloidea
- Family: Alicellidae
- Genus: Alicella; Chevreux, 1899
- Species: A. gigantea

Binomial name
- Alicella gigantea Chevreux, 1899

= Alicella =

Alicella gigantea

Genus of giant crustaceans

Alicella gigantea is a giant species of amphipod inhabiting the deep sea, which is sometimes referred to as the "supergiant amphipod"; these crustaceans may reach 34 cm (13 in) in length. The only species within the genus Alicella, the species is white in colour and is distinguished from closely related amphipods mainly by size, though subtle anatomical differences can be used for small specimens. They live at depths of around 4,850–7,000 m (15,910–22,970 ft), and their large body size is often presented as an example of abyssal gigantism. Genetic studies into the species have found that it has an exceptionally large genome, which may be linked to its large body size, though this trait's origins are still being investigated.

The species was first collected and described in the 1890s from the Madeira Abyssal Plain off the Canary Islands. Although it is not often observed, A. gigantea is thought to be a cosmopolitan species and can potentially inhabit 59% of the world's oceans. Their diet varies with age, but they are primarily scavengers, consuming carrion. Like other amphipods, female A. gigantea brood their eggs in pouches. Individuals of this species are believed to have unusually long lifespans of over 10 years in age. Despite their habitat's isolation from the ocean surface, human pollutants such as DDT and chlordane have been detected in a number of specimens.

== Taxonomy ==
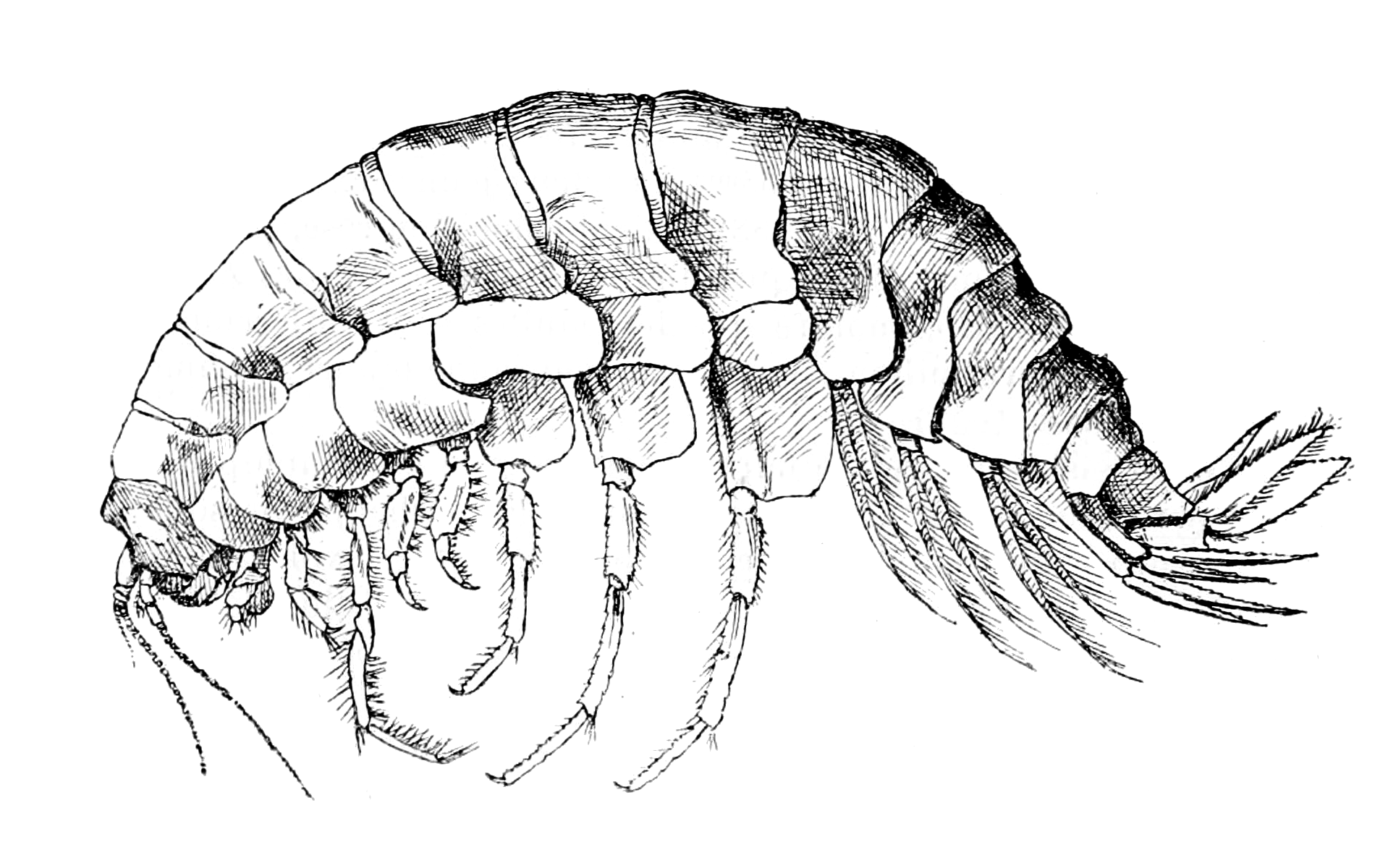
Illustration by Édouard Chevreux, 1899

The first two specimens of Alicella gigantea were collected by the Princess Alice, a ship named after Alice Heine, wife of Prince Albert I of Monaco. These specimens were collected while on an expedition at the Madeira Abyssal Plain off the Canary Islands in 1897 using triangular traps that were set at 5,285 metres (17,339 ft) in depth. The species was then subsequently described by Édouard Chevreux, who named the genus after the ship from which they were collected and placed the species in the family Lysianassidae. The holotype (a single specimen which forms the basis of the species description) and paratype (additional specimens on which a species description is made) specimens are a juvenile of indeterminate sex and a juvenile male respectively; they are currently deposited within the Oceanographic Museum of Monaco. In 1906, the species description was revised by Thomas Roscoe Rede Stebbing.

A second species, Alicella scotiae, was described in 1912 by Charles Chilton from a specimen 20 mm (0.79 in) long collected during the Scottish National Antarctic Expedition. It was described as a new species due to subtle differences in the morphology of its mouthparts. However, this specimen was later recognised to actually be Eurythenes obesus, and A. scotiae was therefore synonymized with that species, making A. gigantea the only species in its genus.

Phylogeny

- - - Cyclocaris franki
    - - Paralicella caperseca
      - Eurythenes gryllus
  - - Civifractura serendipia
    - - Alicella gigantea
      - - - Tectovalopsis sp.
          - Tectovalopsis sp.
        - - Tectovalopsis wegeneri
          - - Tectovalopsis wegeneri
            - - cf. Diatectonia
              - Diatectonia sp.

A. gigantea underwent a taxonomic revision in 1987, when the authors redescribed both original type specimens and described new specimens collected during the SEABED 2 and DEMERABY abyssal campaigns. In 2008, this genus was moved from the Lysianassidae to a new family, the Alicellidae, with Alicella as its type genus; this family contains six other genera, all of which are deep-sea scavengers.

=== Phylogeny ===
There have been a number of genetic studies for Alicella gigantea. In 2020, a study examined the relationships of deep sea amphipod species; sequences of 16S, COI, Histone 3, and 28S found that A. gigantea formed a clade (group of organisms possessing common descent) with Tectovalopsis and Diatectonia. In contrast to this, a 2015 study found that Alicella formed a clade with Cyclocaris and Tectovalopsis (although Diatectonia sequences were not used in this study).

== Description ==
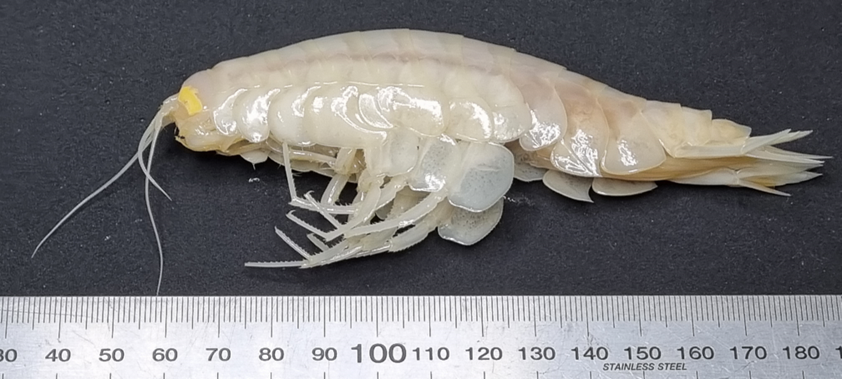
Specimen measuring around 120 mm (4.7 in) in length

Since red wavelengths of light are quickly absorbed by water and thus do not reach the deep sea, most amphipods in this habitat have red to orange coloration, which helps them avoid predators. Alicella gigantea, however, are mostly white, which may reflect their lack of predators.

A. gigantea can be best distinguished from other Alicellidae by a combination of traits, being the possession of a structurally simple first gnathopod (leg-like appendage modified for feeding), and having a rounded hump on the first urosomite (segment that makes up part of the abdomen). There is minimal sexual dimorphism, being very small differences in the shape and size of antenna segments between males and females.

The peduncle (the first three segments of the antennae) of the second antennae is short, and its first article (segment) is strongly swollen. The mouthparts form a squarish bundle with the labrum and epistome (plate-like structures) being inconspicuous and blunt. The incisor (cutting edge) of the mandible is straight with some inner corner teeth. There is one middle tooth, and the rakers (blade-like structures) are absent. The mandibular palp is attached to the front end of the molar, while the molar (grinding section of the mandible) itself is rather large, simple and covered in small "hairs". The first maxilla (mouthpart appendages) have an inner plate with many setae (hair-like structures) occupying the inner edge, while the first maxilla palp (appendage sprouting off the maxilla) is two-jointed and large. The second maxilla has a medial facial row of setae, and the inner and outer plates of the maxilliped (appendages modified for feeding) are strongly developed. The second maxilla palp is longer than the outer plate.

The first coxa (basal, first segment of the gnathopod) is expanded at the anterior end and is visible. The first gnathopod is small and simple, with its third article elongated, its article five longer than the sixth, with a large dactylus (claw). In the second gnathopod, article six is slightly shorter than article five (both of which are elongated and linear), and the seventh article is an overlapping obsolescent palm. The dactyli of the third to seventh pereopods (leg-like structures) are quite short. The inner ramus (branches at the end of an appendage) of the second uropod (appendages on the last segment of the body) is un-notched. The third uropod has a regular peduncle (segment at the beginning of the appendage) and the outer ramus is articulated. The telson (rearmost segment on the body) is elongated and deeply cleft.

=== Gigantism ===
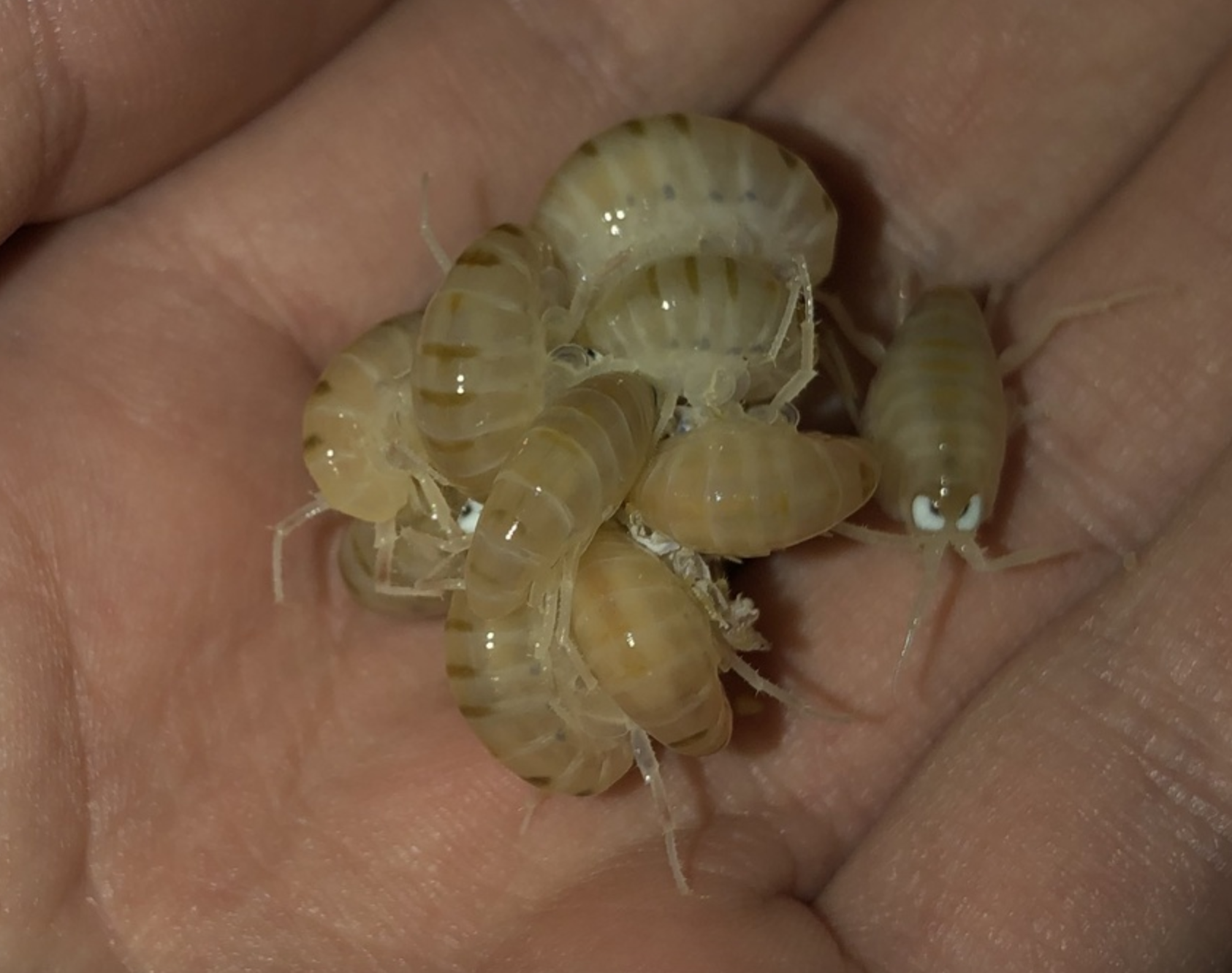
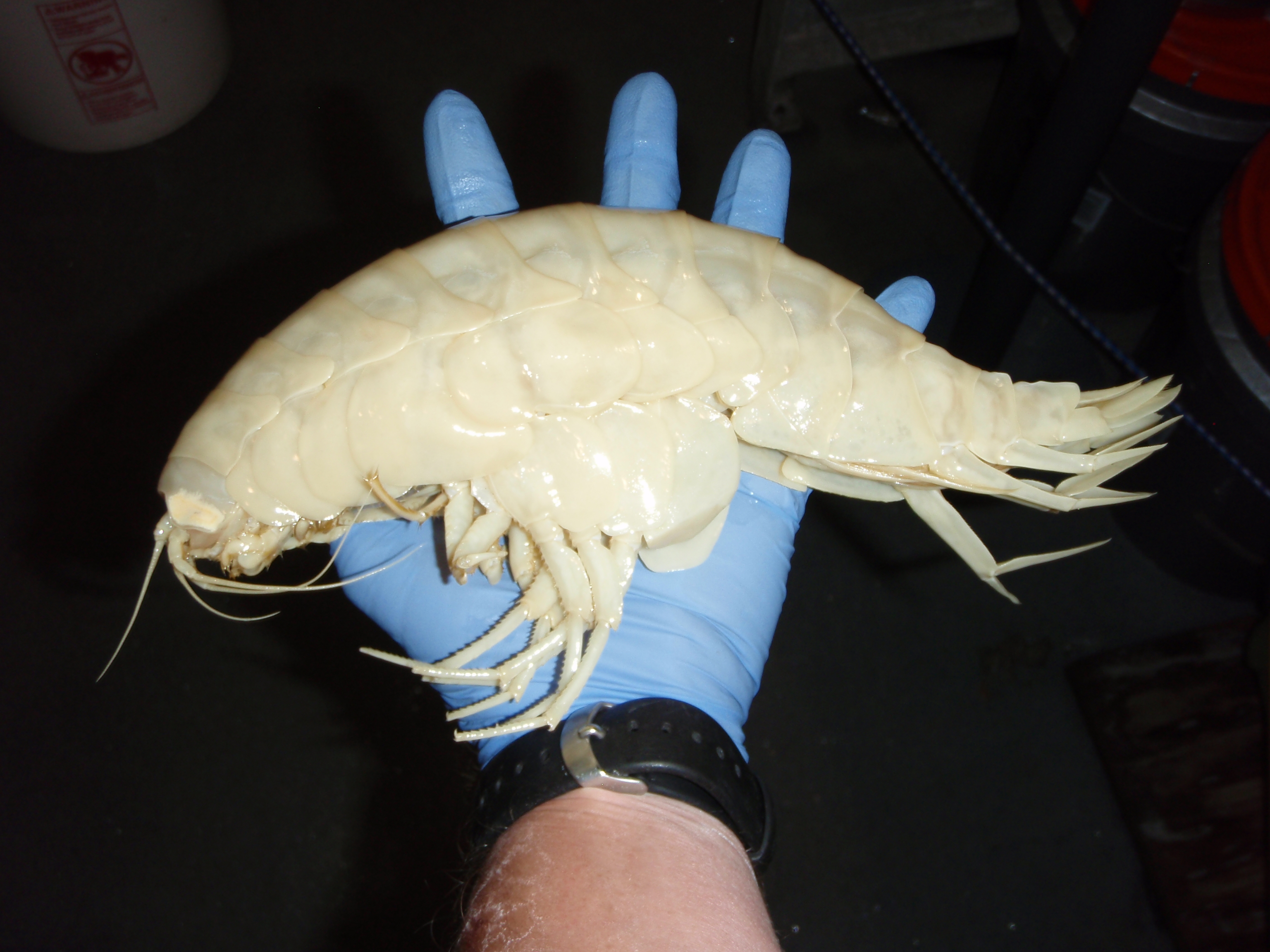
Size comparison between a cluster of Americorchestia (left) and an Alicella gigantea (right). The former is a more typical size for amphipods.

A. gigantea is the largest known amphipod with large individuals ranging between 240–340 mm (9.4–13.4 in) in length. As such, it is sometimes referred to as the "supergiant amphipod". For comparison, other deep sea amphipods such as Eurythenes gryllus and Tectovalopsis wegeneri reach 126 mm (5.0 in) and 33.9 mm (1.33 in) in length respectively. There have been several suggested reasons and mechanisms for this abyssal gigantism.

Deep-sea habitats have reduced temperatures and very high levels of hydrostatic pressure. To counteract these pressures, A. gigantea are hypothesised to have increased cell sizes and lifespans, which in turn lead to abnormally large body growth (gigantism). One study in 2021 found that genes related to "growth regulation" were over-represented in A. gigantea when compared to smaller amphipods. This indicates that size control or growth regulation mechanisms may be responsible for the large size of the species.

One study reported that A. gigantea had a high level of selenium in its leg muscles. This trace element is linked with growth and metabolic activity, and may partially explain why this species grows so large.

Another potential reason for the large size of A. gigantea was suggested by a 2013 study: it appears to have undergone a whole genome duplication, which could potentially increase the size of the species and explain its large genome size.

=== Genome ===
In 2017, the size of the whole genome was estimated to be about 34.02 gigabase pairs (34.79 pg) in length, which is considerably larger than genome size estimates for other species of deep amphipods in the same study. Due to the large size of its genome compared to other deep-sea amphipods, it has been shown that A. gigantea exhibits a faster rate of genome size change. It was hypothesised that this could be due to a whole-genome duplication.

In 2019, the complete mitochondrial genome of A. gigantea was sequenced with a total length of 16,851 base pairs. The study found that the genome had 13 protein-coding genes, 2 ribosomal genes, 22 transfer RNA genes and 2 noncoding gene regions.

== Distribution and habitat ==
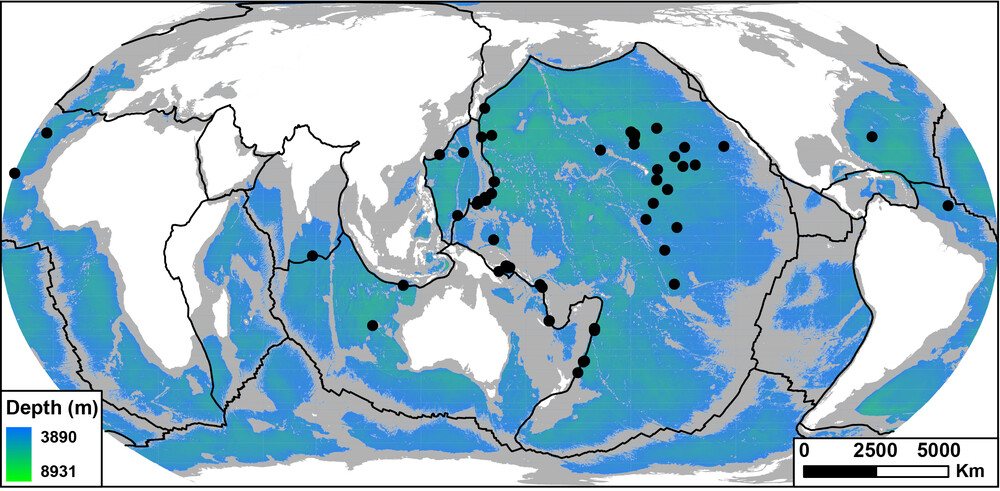
Possible maximal range of A. gigantea; black dots represent localities where Alicella have been collected. Coloured sections indicate areas of seafloor within adequate depth for the species.

Alicella gigantea is a rarely encountered marine species that has primarily been recorded in the lower abyssal and hadal zones between 4,850–7,000 metres (16,000–23,000 ft) in depth, which would restrict them to oceanic trenches and fracture zones, such as the Kermadec Trench in the southwest Pacific. A 2025 study would expand their depth range: using data from 195 collected A. gigantea, it was determined that the species inhabits depths between 3,890–8,931 m (12,760–29,300 ft), which suggests that 59% of the world's oceans (and all six major ocean bodies) is a suitable habitat for this amphipod. However, a juvenile specimen was collected from a fish trap recovered from a depth of 1,720 metres (5,640 ft). There is also a record of a specimen from the stomach of a black-footed albatross in the Hawaiian Islands; it has been suggested that the high lipid content of this species caused this particular specimen to float upwards in the water column, which allowed the albatross to reach it.

It is a cosmopolitan species, having been recorded in the North Atlantic, North Pacific, and South West Pacific oceans. The numerous gaps in their distribution are likely due to incomplete sampling of this species. A 2025 study examined the genetics of A. gigantea populations over its entire known range, showing that while populations had several haplotypes (group of genes that are inherited from a parent), most shared a single common haplotype for each gene. This indicates that there is significant gene flow between populations.

== Biology ==
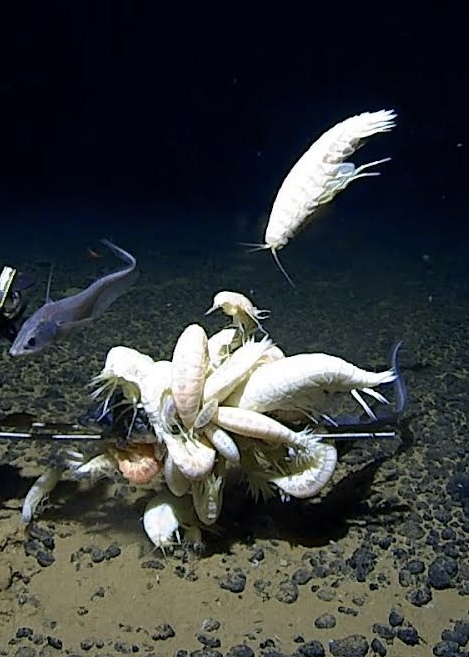
Several Alicella feeding from a BRUVS. The nearby fish are grenadiers.

Marine amphipods swim using their pleopods, which are pulsed more quickly for higher speeds. They are also capable of walking on solid surfaces using their pereopods, but this method is not as fast.

=== Feeding ecology ===
Like many other amphipods, adult Alicella gigantea are primarily scavengers and feed on carrion. Because of this behaviour, they are most frequently caught using baited traps.

The gut microbiome of A. gigantea is dominated by Candidatus Hepatoplasma. One study in 2022 compared the gut microbiome of A. gigantea with that of two other hadal amphipods and found that a particular gut assemblage was unique to each species. It has also been discovered that hadal amphipods such as A. gigantea have large amounts of "probiotic" bacteria (microorganisms that are beneficial to the host) in their gut microbiota. Presently, it is unknown if these amphipods' gut microbes are inherited from their parents or picked up from the environment.

The size of adult A. gigantea allows them to avoid predation by fish such as Notoliparis kermadecensis, a liparid snailfish that preys on smaller amphipods. A. gigantea ranging from 40 to 100 mm (1.6 to 3.9 in) in length have been recorded from stomach contents of the rough abyssal grenadier (Coryphaenoides yaquinae).

=== Life cycle ===
Like all amphipods, female A. gigantea brood their eggs in a pouch. It has been suggested that females probably have several broods over their lifetimes. The eggs are oval in shape and are 6.95 to 14.88 mm (0.274 to 0.586 in) in length. The eggshell is composed of two chorion layers: the exochorion (outer layer), which is fibrillar in structure, and the endochorion (inner layer), which has a porous structure with pores averaging more than 10 μm in diameter.

As juveniles, their diet consists mostly of bacteria and zooplankton debris, transitioning into carrion and algae as they mature. Analysis of ^{14}C signatures indicates that deep sea amphipods such as Alicella gigantea have an unusually long lifespan of over 10 years.

== Human impact ==
Despite their apparent isolation from the ocean's surface, their dependence on carrion as a food source may affect Alicella through overfishing and chemical pollution. Various manmade pollutants have been detected in the species; in one study in 2020, pesticides such as DDT and chlordane were detected in A. gigantea specimens, whilst in a 2022 study trace elements such as cadmium and chromium were detected in high concentrations, which were thought to be linked to human activity.
