= Ingolfiella longipes =

Conservation status
- Critically Endangered (IUCN 2.3)

Scientific classification
- Kingdom: Animalia
- Phylum: Arthropoda
- Class: Malacostraca
- Order: Ingolfiellida
- Family: Ingolfiellidae
- Genus: Ingolfiella
- Species: I. longipes

Binomial name
- Ingolfiella longipes Stock, Sket & Iliffe, 1987

Species of crustacean

Ingolfiella longipes is a species of amphipod crustacean in the family Ingolfiellidae notable for its orange striped coloration. It is known from a single specimen held at the Naturalis Biodiversity Center. It was collected from Walsingham Sink Cave, an anchialine cave in Hamilton Parish, Bermuda, and is thus considered to be critically endangered.
