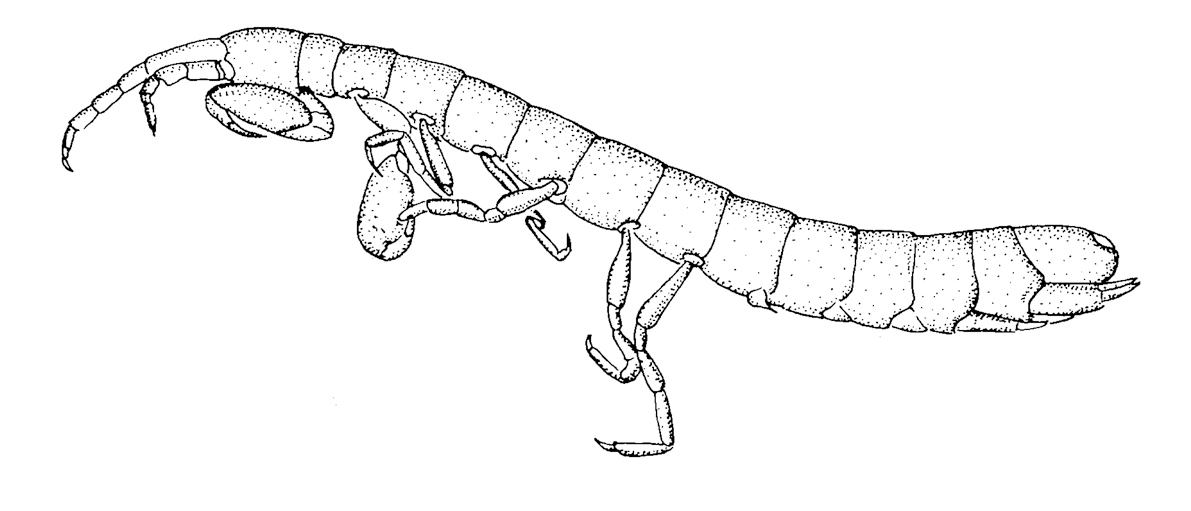
- Ingolfiella ischitana

Scientific classification
- Kingdom: Animalia
- Phylum: Arthropoda
- Clade: Pancrustacea
- Class: Malacostraca
- Order: Ingolfiellida
- Family: Ingolfiellidae
- Genus: Ingolfiella; Hansen, 1903

Type species
- Ingolfiella abyssi Hansen, 1903

= Ingolfiella =

Genus of crustaceans

Ingolfiella is a genus of amphipod in the family Ingolfiellidae, containing the following species:

- Ingolfiella abyssi Hansen, 1903
- Ingolfiella alba Ianilli, Berera & Cottarelli, 2008
- Ingolfiella australiana Lowry & Poore, 1989
- Ingolfiella bassiana Lowry & Poore, 1989
- Ingolfiella beatricis Ruffo & Vonk, 2001
- Ingolfiella berrisfordi Ruffo, 1974
- Ingolfiella britannica Spooner, 1960
- Ingolfiella canariensis Vonk & Sànchez, 1991
- Ingolfiella catalanensis Coineau, 1963
- Ingolfiella cottarellii Ruffo & Vigna-taglianti, 1989
- Ingolfiella dracospiritus Griffiths, 1989
- Ingolfiella fontinalis Stock, 1977
- Ingolfiella fuscina Dojiri & Sieg, 1987
- Ingolfiella georgei Andres, 2005
- Ingolfiella gobabis Griffiths, 1989
- Ingolfiella grandispina Stock, 1979
- Ingolfiella inermis Shimomura, Ohtsuka & Tomikawa, 2006
- Ingolfiella ischitana Schiecke, 1973
- Ingolfiella kapuri coineau & Rou, 1972
- Ingolfiella littoralis Hansen, 1903
- Ingolfiella longipes Stock, Sket & Iliffe, 1987
- Ingolfiella macedonica S. Karaman, 1959
- Ingolfiella manni Noodt, 1961
- Ingolfiella margaritae Stock, 1979
- Ingolfiella petkovskii S. Karaman, 1957
- Ingolfiella putealis Stock, 1976
- Ingolfiella quadridentata Stock, 1979
- Ingolfiella quokka Gallego-Martinez & Poore, 2003
- Ingolfiella rocaensis Senna & Serejo, 2005
- Ingolfiella ruffo Siewing, 1958
- Ingolfiella sandroruffoi Andres, 2004
- Ingolfiella similis Rondé-Broekhuizen & Stock, 1987
- Ingolfiella tabularis Stock, 1977
- Ingolfiella thibaudi Coineau, 1968
- Ingolfiella unguiculata Stock, 1992
- Ingolfiella uspallatae Noodt, 1965
- Ingolfiella vandeli Bou, 1970
- Ingolfiella xarifae Ruffo, 1966
