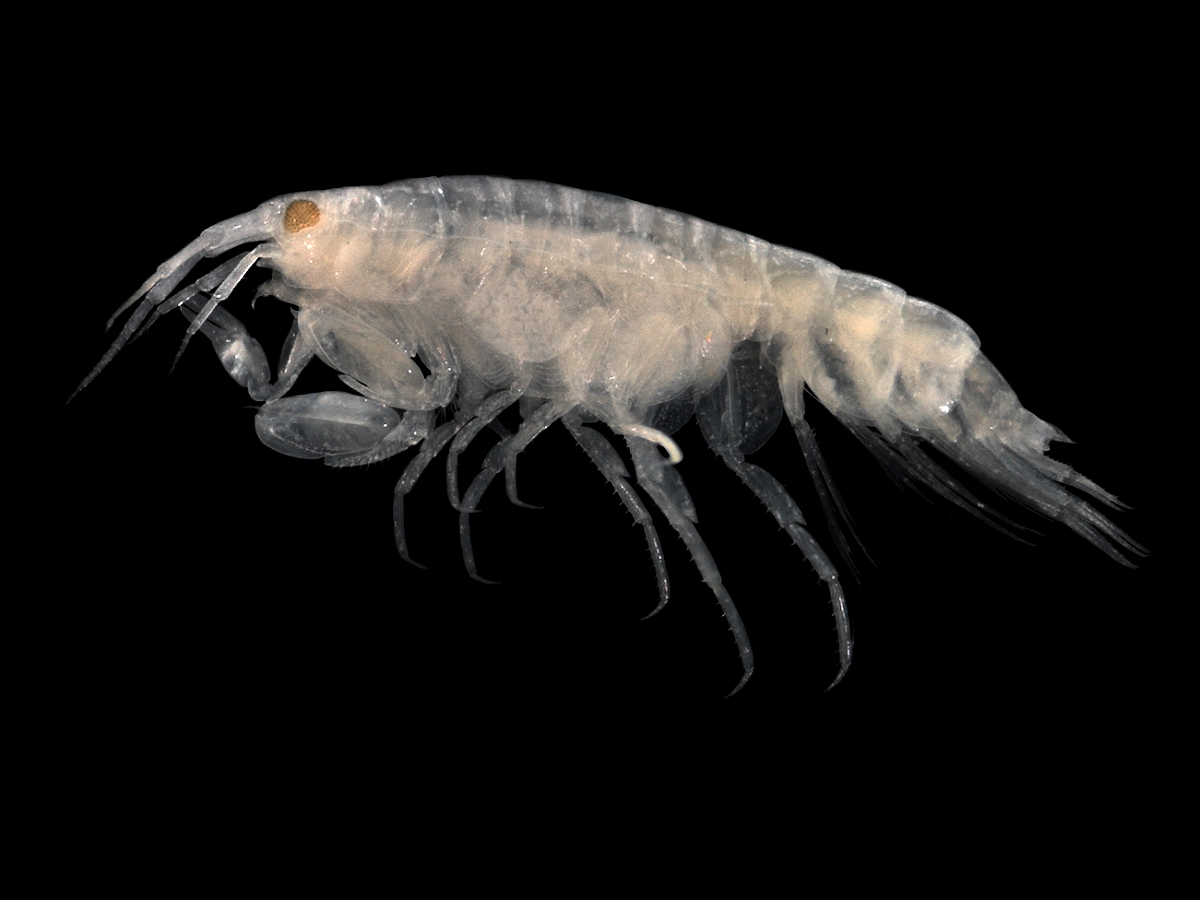
- Leucothoe incisa

Scientific classification
- Kingdom: Animalia
- Phylum: Arthropoda
- Clade: Pancrustacea
- Class: Malacostraca
- Order: Amphipoda
- Parvorder: Amphilochidira
- Superfamily: Leucothoidea
- Family: Leucothoidae; Dana, 1852

Synonyms
- Anamixidae Stebbing, 1897

= Leucothoidae =

Family of crustaceans

Leucothoidae is a family of amphipods. It contains 138 species in 5 genera:

- Anamixis Stebbing, 1897 – 21 species
- Leucothoe Leach, 1814 – 98 species
- Nepanamixis Thomas, 1997 – 4 species
- Paranamixis Schellenberg, 1938 – 13 species
- Paraleucothoe Stebbing, 1899 – 2 species

Males undergo a profound transformation when they reach sexual maturity, turning from the "leucomorph" state to the "anamorph" state. Before this transformation was recognised in 1983, females and immature males were described in the genus Leucothoides (Leucothoidae), and mature males were described in the genera Anamixis, Paranamixis and Nepanamixis (Anamixidae). The genus Leucothoides may still be used for leucomorphs of species whose anamorph has not yet been identified.
