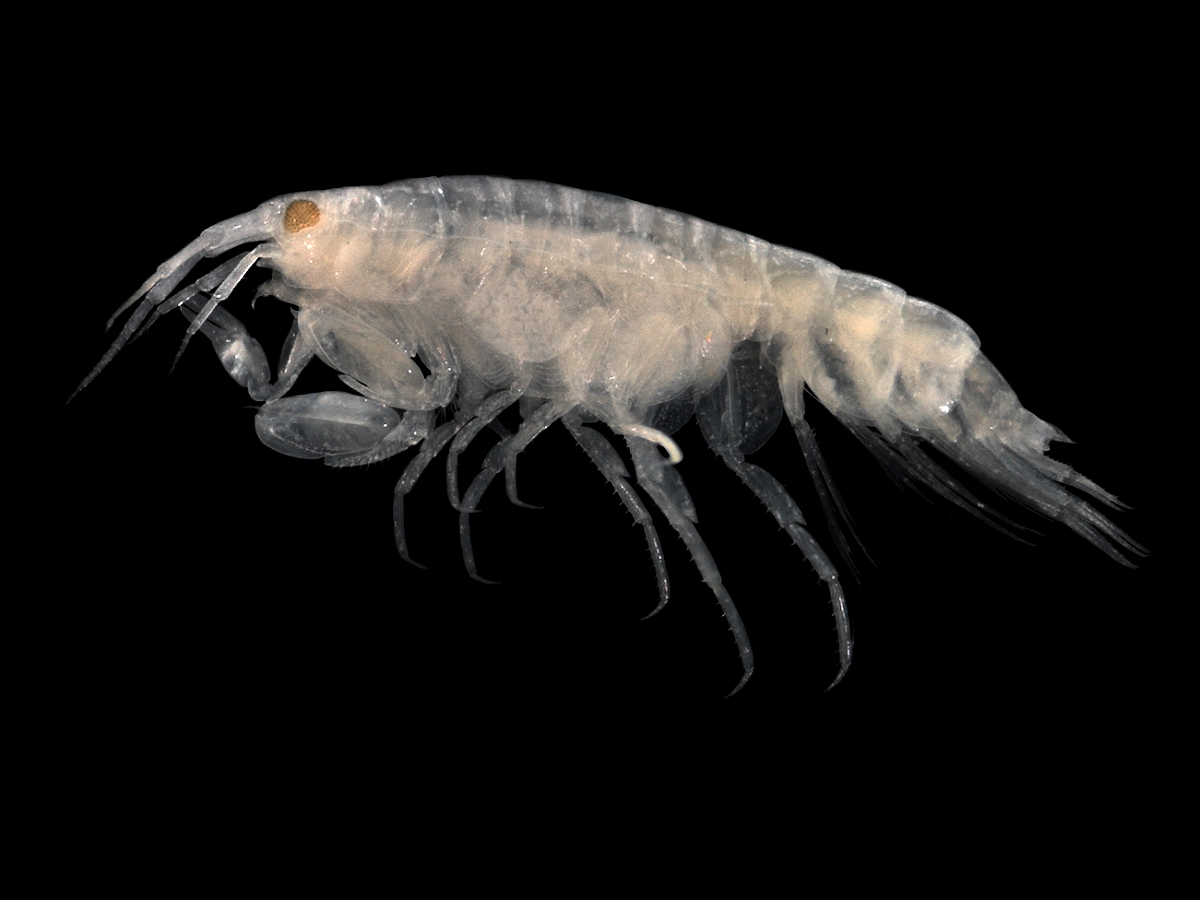
- Leucothoe incisa

Scientific classification
- Kingdom: Animalia
- Phylum: Arthropoda
- Clade: Pancrustacea
- Class: Malacostraca
- Order: Amphipoda
- Family: Leucothoidae
- Genus: Leucothoe; Leach, 1814

Type species
- Cancer articulosus Montagu, 1804

= Leucothoe (crustacean) =

Genus of crustaceans

Leucothoe is a genus of amphipods in the family Leucothoidae. It contains the following species:

- Leucothoe acanthopus Schellenberg, 1928
- Leucothoe acutilobata Ledoyer, 1978
- Leucothoe adelphe White & Thomas, 2009
- Leucothoe affinis Stimpson, 1856
- Leucothoe alata J. L. Barnard, 1959
- Leucothoe alcyone Imbach, 1967
- Leucothoe angusticoxa (Ledoyer, 1972)
- Leucothoe ashleyae Thomas & Klebba, 2006
- Leucothoe assimilis J. L. Barnard, 1974
- Leucothoe atosi Bellan-Santini, 2007
- Leucothoe ayrtonia Bellan-Santini, 1997
- Leucothoe barana Thomas & Klebba, 2007
- Leucothoe basilobata Serejo, 1998
- Leucothoe bidens Hirayama, 1985
- Leucothoe boolpooli J. L. Barnard, 1974
- Leucothoe bova White & Thomas, 2009
- Leucothoe brevidigitata Miers, 1884
- Leucothoe brunonis Krapp-Schickel & Menioui, 2005
- Leucothoe campi Mateus & Mateus, 1986
- Leucothoe cheiriserra Serejo, 1998
- Leucothoe commensalis Haswell, 1879
- Leucothoe crassimana Kossmann, 1880
- Leucothoe crenatipalma Ledoyer, 1972
- Leucothoe ctenochasma Moore, 1987
- Leucothoe ctenochir K. H. Barnard, 1925
- Leucothoe dentata Ledoyer, 1973
- Leucothoe dentitelson (Chevreux, 1925)
- Leucothoe diemenensis Haswell, 1879
- Leucothoe dolichoceras K. H. Barnard, 1916
- Leucothoe eltoni Thomas, 2015
- Leucothoe epideomos White & Thomas, 2009
- Leucothoe eumilli White & Thomas, 2009
- Leucothoe euryonyx (Walker, 1901)
- Leucothoe flammosa Thomas & Klebba, 2007
- Leucothoe furina (Savigny, 1816)
- Leucothoe garifunae Thomas & Klebba, 2007
- Leucothoe gavialis Myers, 1985
- Leucothoe germanalcyone Hirayama, 1992
- Leucothoe goowera J. L. Barnard, 1974
- Leucothoe grandimanus Stimpson, 1853
- Leucothoe hendrickxi Winfield & Alvarez, 2009
- Leucothoe hipposideros White & Thomas, 2009
- Leucothoe hornelli (Walker, 1904)
- Leucothoe hyhelia J. L. Barnard, 1965
- Leucothoe incisa (Robertson, 1892)
- Leucothoe kensleyi Thomas & Klebba, 2005
- Leucothoe laevipalma White & Thomas, 2009
- Leucothoe laticoxa Ledoyer, 1978
- Leucothoe laurensi Thomas & Ortiz, 1995
- Leucothoe leptosa Serejo, 1998
- Leucothoe lihue J. L. Barnard, 1970
- Leucothoe lilljeborgi Boeck, 1861
- Leucothoe madrasana Sivaprakasam, 1969
- Leucothoe makrommatos White & Thomas, 2009
- Leucothoe mateusae (Barnard & Karaman, 1991)
- Leucothoe micronesiae J. L. Barnard, 1965
- Leucothoe minima Schellenberg, 1925
- Leucothoe minuscula Schellenberg, 1938
- Leucothoe nagatai Ishimaru, 1985
- Leucothoe neptunea Moore, 1987
- Leucothoe oboa Karaman, 1971
- Leucothoe occulta Krapp-Schickel, 1975
- Leucothoe odontiskos White & Thomas, 2009
- Leucothoe orkneyi Holman & Watling, 1983
- Leucothoe pachycera Della Valle, 1893
- Leucothoe pacifica Nagata, 1963
- Leucothoe panpulco J. L. Barnard, 1961
- Leucothoe pollex White & Thomas, 2009
- Leucothoe predenticulata Ledoyer, 1978
- Leucothoe procera Bate, 1857
- Leucothoe richiardii Lesson, 1865
- Leucothoe rostrata Chevreux, 1908
- Leucothoe rudicula White & Thomas, 2009
- Leucothoe safiae Lyons & Myers, 1991
- Leucothoe saron Thomas & Klebba, 2007
- Leucothoe serrata White & Thomas, 2009
- Leucothoe serraticarpa Della Valle, 1893
- Leucothoe sparsa White & Thomas, 2009
- Leucothoe spinicarpa (Abildgaard, 1789)
- Leucothoe spinulosa Chevreux, 1919-20
- Leucothoe squalidens Ledoyer, 1984
- Leucothoe stegoceras Walker, 1904
- Leucothoe stylifera Stimpson, 1856
- Leucothoe tarte J. L. Barnard, 1974
- Leucothoe thula White & Thomas, 2009
- Leucothoe tolkieni G. Vinogradov, 1990
- Leucothoe trailli Thomson, 1882
- Leucothoe tridens Stebbing, 1888
- Leucothoe ubouhu Thomas & Klebba, 2007
- Leucothoe undulata White & Thomas, 2009
- Leucothoe urospinosa Serejo, 1998
- Leucothoe uschakovi Gurjanova, 1951
- Leucothoe venetiarum Giordani-Soika, 1950
- Leucothoe wuriti Thomas & Klebba, 2007
