= Martensia martensi =

Scientific classification
- Domain: Eukaryota
- Kingdom: Animalia
- Phylum: Arthropoda
- Class: Malacostraca
- Order: Amphipoda
- Family: Lysianassidae
- Genus: Martensia; Barnard & Karaman, 1991
- Species: M. martensi

Binomial name
- Martensia martensi (Goës, 1866)

Synonyms
- Lysianassa martensi Goës, 1866; Uristes martensi (Goës, 1866)

Species of crustacean

Martensia martensi is a species of amphipod crustacean, and the only species in the genus Martensia. It occurs in waters around Svalbard at depths of 37–95 metres (121–312 ft).

== Description ==
M. martensi is only known from four specimens collected in 1861 in two fjords on the island of Spitsbergen – Kongsfjorden and Isfjorden. They are all immature, and measure 6–8 millimetres (0.24–0.31 in) long.

== Taxonomy ==
A. Goës described Lysianassa martensi as a new species in 1866. It was redescribed in 1968, and tentatively assigned to the genus Uristes. In 1991, J. Laurens Barnard and G. S. Karaman erected a new genus, Martensia, for this species alone, and the genus remains monotypic.
