= Metaingolfiella =

Scientific classification
- Domain: Eukaryota
- Kingdom: Animalia
- Phylum: Arthropoda
- Class: Malacostraca
- Order: Amphipoda
- Suborder: Ingolfiellidea
- Infraorder: Ingolfiellidamorpha
- Parvorder: Metaingolfiellidira
- Superfamily: Metaingolfielloidea
- Family: Metaingolfiellidae
- Genus: Metaingolfiella; Ruffo, 1969
- Species: M. mirabilis

Binomial name
- Metaingolfiella mirabilis Ruffo, 1969

Genus of crustaceans

Metaingolfiella is a monotypic genus of crustaceans belonging to the monotypic family Metaingolfiellidae. The only species is Metaingolfiella mirabilis.
