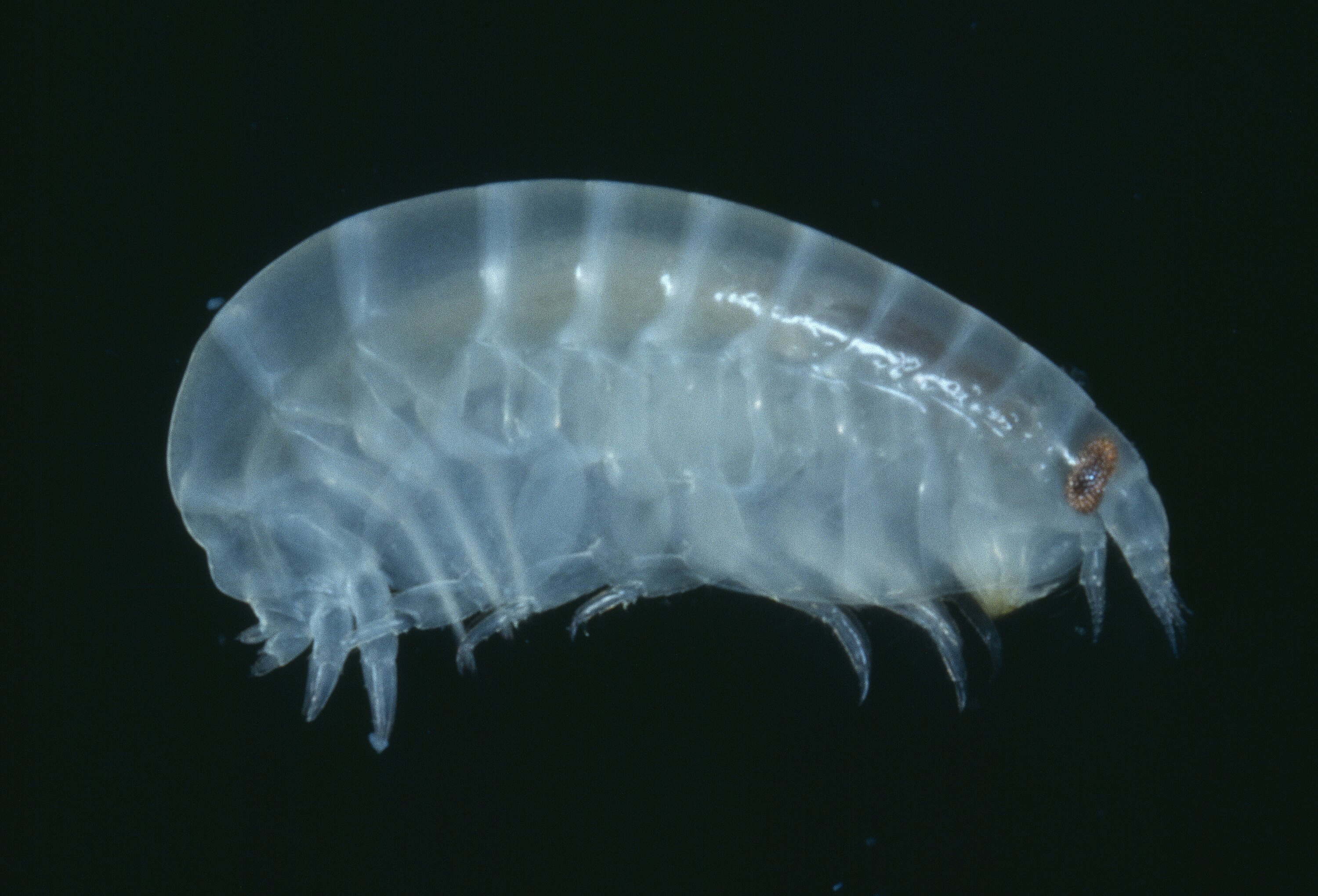
- Parawaldeckia sp.

Scientific classification
- Domain: Eukaryota
- Kingdom: Animalia
- Phylum: Arthropoda
- Class: Malacostraca
- Order: Amphipoda
- Family: Lysianassidae
- Genus: Parawaldeckia; Stebbing,1910

Type species
- Parawaldeckia thomsoni (Stebbing, 1906)

= Parawaldeckia =

Genus of crustacean

Parawaldeckia is a genus of amphipod crustacean in the family, Lysianassidae. and was first described by Thomas Roscoe Rede Stebbing in 1910. The type species is Parawaldeckia thomsoni (first described in 1906 by Stebbing as Nannonyx thomsoni ).

In Australia species of the genus are found in waters off New South Wales, South Australia, Tasmania, Western Australia, and off Macquarie Island and the Australian Antarctic territory. They are also found off New Zealand, off southern South America, and in subantarctic waters. They are bottom dwelling at depths of 200 metres.

The body is segmented and flattened at the side, and there are seven pairs of walking legs at the front and three pairs of small limbs at the back.

== Species ==
Species accepted by WoRMS (2022) are:

- Parawaldeckia angusta Lowry & Stoddart, 1983
- Parawaldeckia dabita Lowry & Stoddart, 1983
- Parawaldeckia dilkera J.L. Barnard, 1972
- Parawaldeckia hirsuta Lowry & Stoddart, 1983
- Parawaldeckia karaka Lowry & Stoddart, 1983
- Parawaldeckia kidderi (S.I. Smith, 1876)
- Parawaldeckia lowryi Myers, 1985
- Parawaldeckia parata Lowry & Stoddart, 1983
- Parawaldeckia pulchra Lowry & Stoddart, 1983
- Parawaldeckia stebbingi (Thomson, 1893)
- Parawaldeckia stephenseni Hurley & Cooper, 1974
- Parawaldeckia suzae Lowry & Stoddart, 1983
- Parawaldeckia thomsoni (Stebbing, 1906)
- Parawaldeckia vesca Lowry & Stoddart, 1983
- Parawaldeckia yamba J.L. Barnard, 1972
