= Alania (disambiguation) =

Alania was the medieval state of the Alans or Alani people in the North Caucasus.

Alania may also refer to:

- Ossetia, an ethnolinguistic region located in the Caucasus
  - Republic of North Ossetia–Alania, a federal subject of the Russian Federation
  - The State of Alania, the second official name of the disputed Republic of South Ossetia
- Alania Airlines, an airline based in Vladikavkaz, North Ossetia–Alania
- FC Alania Vladikavkaz, a Russian football club from Vladikavkaz
- Alanïa, a Norwegian former electronic music group
- Alania TV, Georgian TV channel broadcasting in the Russian language
- Alania (amphipod), a genus of amphipods in the family Stegocephalidae
- Alania (plant), a genus of plants in the family Boryaceae

== See also ==
- Ossetian (disambiguation)
- Alans, ancient nomadic-pastoralist Sarmatian tribes of the Caucasus
- Alanian language, Scytho-Sarmatian language of the Eastern Iranian family, ancestor of modern Ossetian
