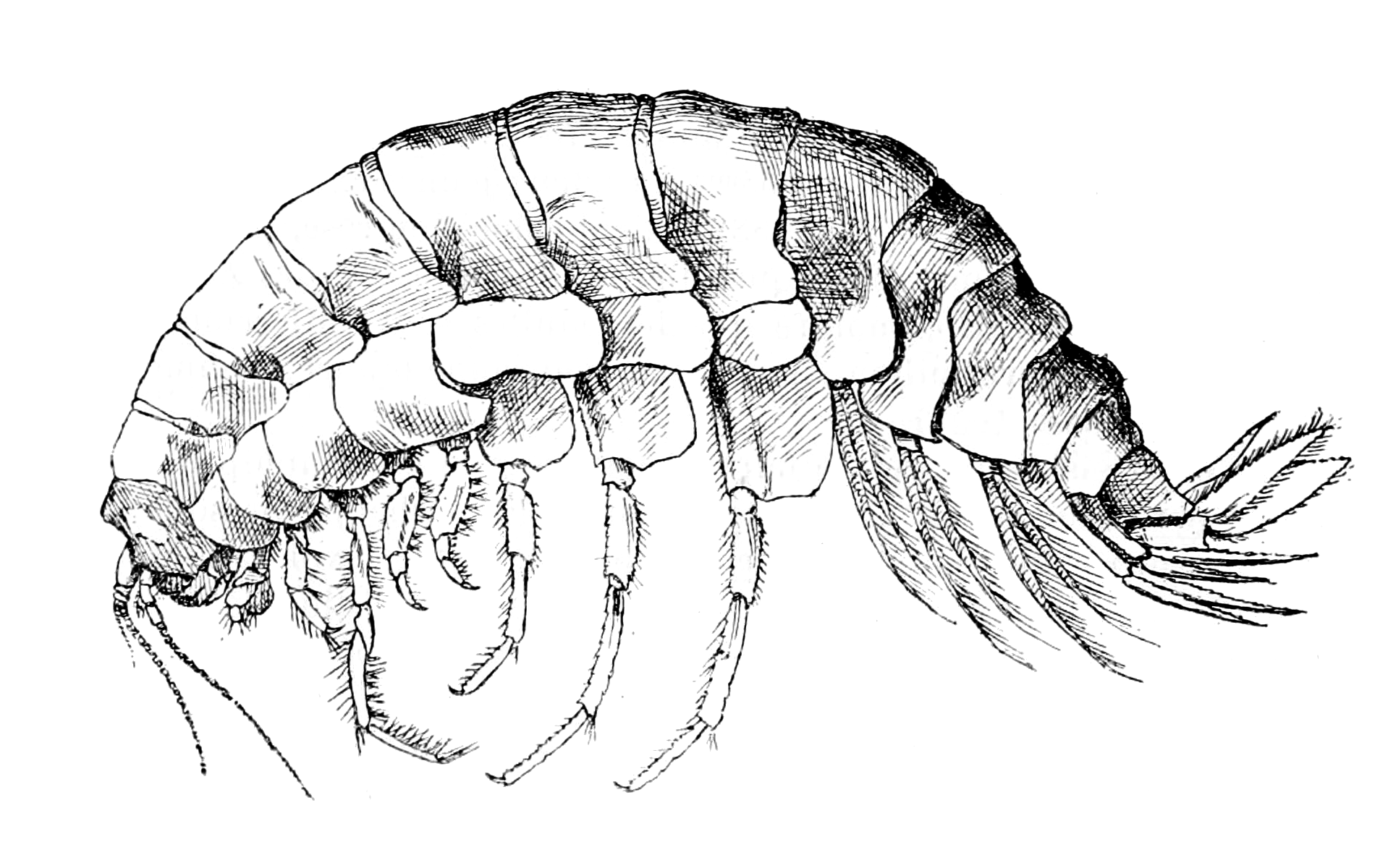
- Alicella gigantea

Scientific classification
- Kingdom: Animalia
- Phylum: Arthropoda
- Clade: Pancrustacea
- Class: Malacostraca
- Order: Amphipoda
- Superfamily: Alicelloidea
- Family: Alicellidae; Lowry & De Broyer, 2008

= Alicellidae =

Family of crustaceans

Alicellidae is a family of amphipod crustaceans, which live as scavengers in the deep sea (at depths of 706–8,480 metres or 2,316–27,822 feet), often in association with hydrothermal vents.

== Genera ==
The family includes the following genera:

- Alicella Chevreux, 1899
- Apotectonia Barnard & Ingram, 1990
- Civifractura Weston, Peart & Jamieson, 2020
- Diatectonia Barnard & Ingram, 1990
- Paralicella Chevreux, 1908
- Tectovalopsis Barnard & Ingram, 1990
- Transtectonia Barnard & Ingram, 1990

== Phylogeny ==
Phylogeny

- - - Cyclocaris franki
    - - Paralicella caperseca
      - Eurythenes gryllus
  - - Civifractura serendipia
    - - Alicella gigantea
      - - - Tectovalopsis sp.
          - Tectovalopsis sp.
        - - Tectovalopsis wegeneri
          - - Tectovalopsis wegeneri
            - - cf. Diatectonia
              - Diatectonia sp.
