= Ossetian =

Ossetian may refer to:

- A person or thing from the region of Ossetia in the Caucasus
- Ossetian language, an eastern Iranian language
  - Ossetian people, speakers of the language
- North Ossetia-Alania, federal administrative division of Russia
- South Ossetia, a breakaway state of Georgia with limited recognition

== See also ==
- Alania (disambiguation)
