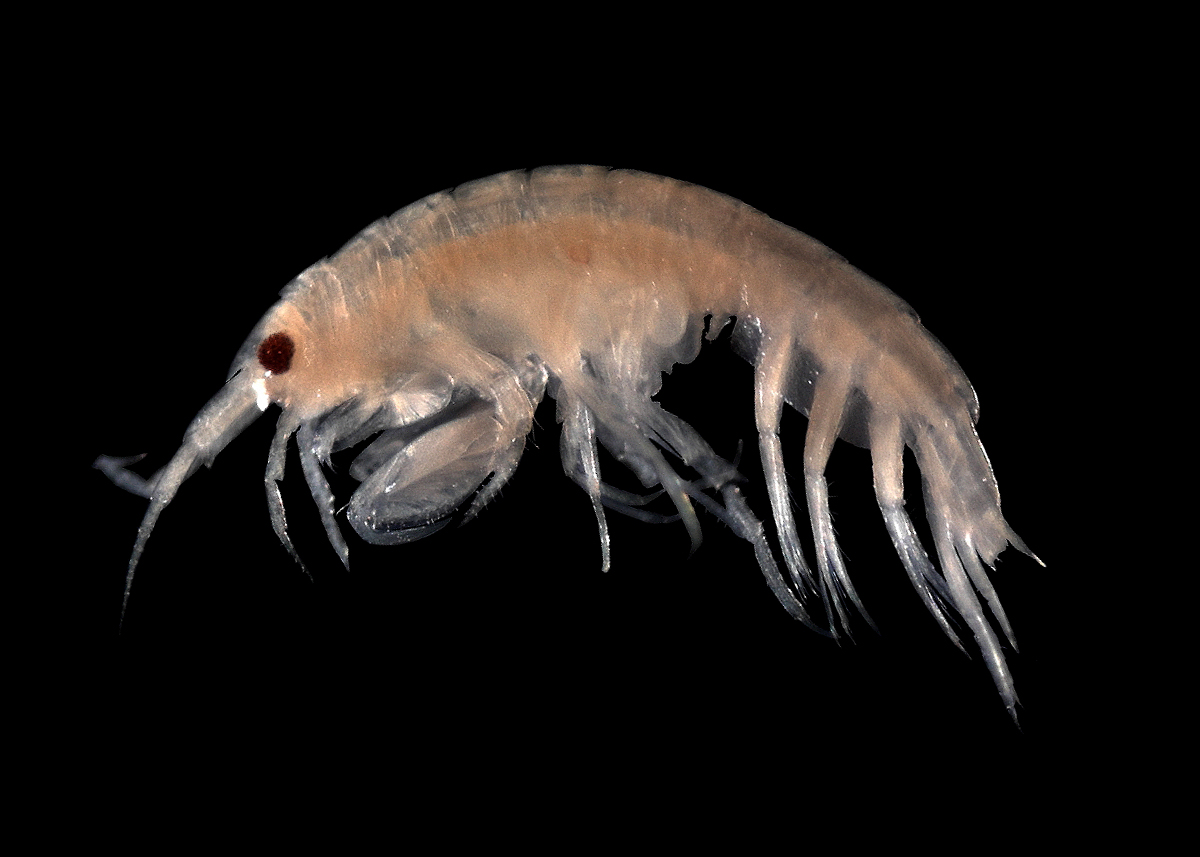

Scientific classification
- Kingdom: Animalia
- Phylum: Arthropoda
- Clade: Pancrustacea
- Class: Malacostraca
- Order: Amphipoda
- Family: Leucothoidae
- Genus: Leucothoe
- Species: L. incisa

Binomial name
- Leucothoe incisa Robertson, 1892

= Leucothoe incisa =

Species of crustacean

Leucothoe incisa is an amphipod in the family Leucothoidae. It grows up to 7 millimetres (0.28 in) long, and is whitish in colour, but a yellowish green along the back, with intensely red eyes. It lives at depths of up to 60 metres (200 ft) along the Atlantic coast of Europe from the Mediterranean Sea to Scotland, and in the North Sea. It is part of group of sibling species, together with Leucothoe lilljeborgi and Leucothoe occulta.
