= Civifractura =

Scientific classification
- Domain: Eukaryota
- Kingdom: Animalia
- Phylum: Arthropoda
- Class: Malacostraca
- Order: Amphipoda
- Family: Alicellidae
- Genus: Civifractura; Weston, Peart & Jamieson, 2020

Type species
- Civifractura serendipia Weston, Peart & Jamieson, 2020

Genus of crustaceans

Civifractura is a monotypic genus of deep sea amphipods in the family, Alicellidae, first described in 2020 by Johanna Weston, Rachael Peart, and Alan Jamieson. The specific name of its only species, Civifractura serendipia, refers to its serendipitous discovery. This species was collected at a depth of 4,932 metres (16,181 ft) in the Wallaby-Zenith fracture zone of the Indian Ocean.
