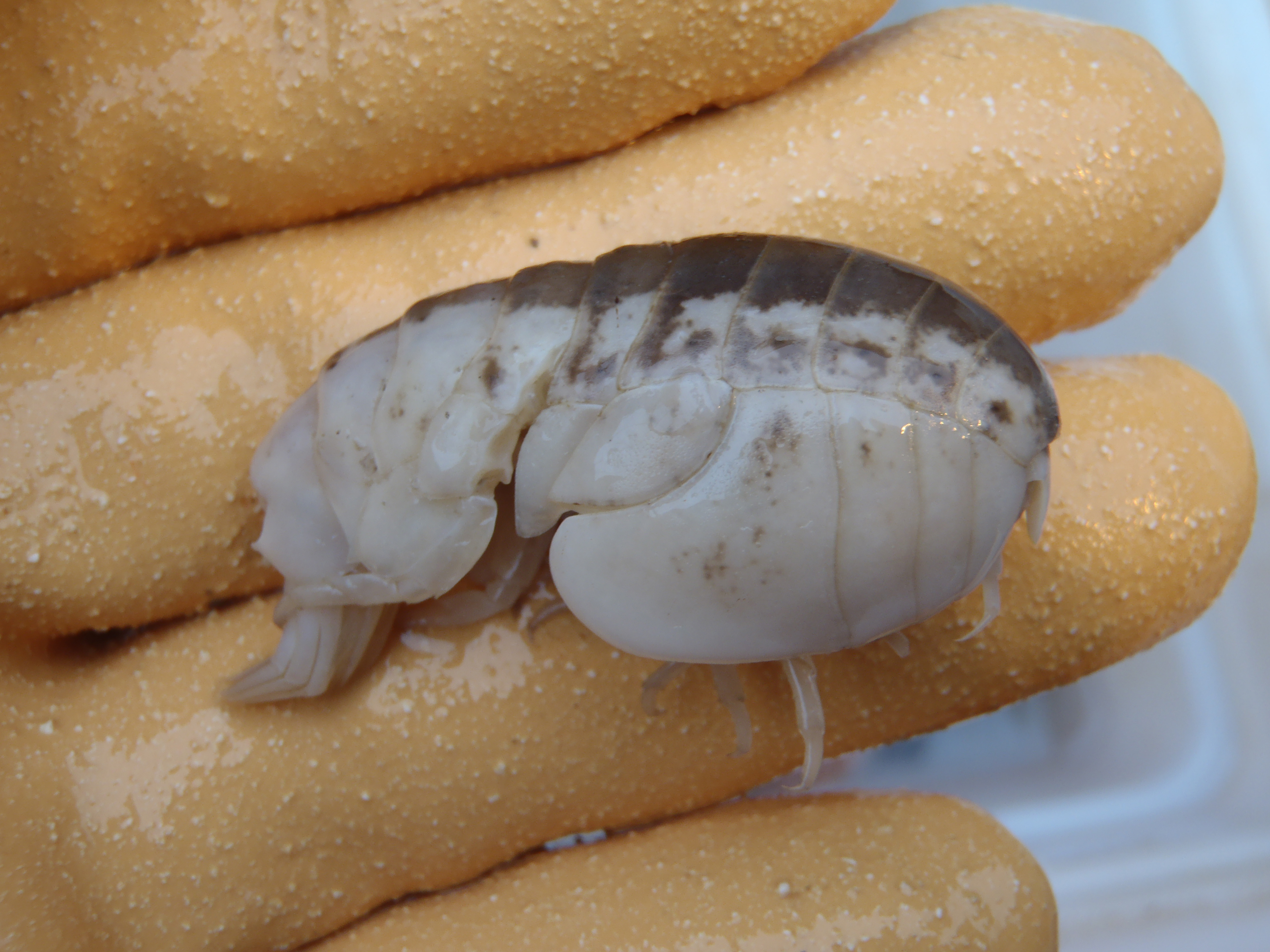
- A stegocephalid amphipod from the eastern Bering Sea

Scientific classification
- Kingdom: Animalia
- Phylum: Arthropoda
- Clade: Pancrustacea
- Class: Malacostraca
- Order: Amphipoda
- Superfamily: Stegocephaloidea
- Family: Stegocephalidae; Dana, 1852

= Stegocephalidae =

Family of crustaceans

Stegocephalidae is a little-studied family of amphipods belonging to the suborder Gammaridea.

== Description ==
Stegocephalids have smooth and globular bodies with a short and deep head. It has small rostrum and the highly modified mouthparts are arranged into a cone structure. the functions of which are unknown but believed to be either for sucking or piercing. The upper part of the lips has a small notch on the distal side, while the lower lip are tall and lack inner lobes. The mandibular molar and palp may be absent or only present in vestigial forms. On the maxilla, the inner plates are setose and well-developed while the palp is often reduced and consists of only a single segment. The maxillipeds are large, often with an inner cutting edge and slender weakly dactylate palps. The eyes are kidney-shaped when present, but is more often completely absent. The antennae possess short peduncles and flagella, with that on the first pair being somewhat stout with fused flagellar segments near the base. In males the first antennal pair is covered with brushlike setae.

On the first four body segments are four very large, non-overlapping, and deep coxal plates, forming a sort of skirt on the front half of the body. The fourth plates are subovate in shape and are the largest. The gnathopods may are slender and may possess small claws or none at all. The third to seventh pereopods are roughly the same size, with the seventh pair being the shortest. The pleon plates on the sides of the body are deep with strong pleopods. The three uropods possess rami that are about the same size and are lanceolate in shape. Their tips extend past the telson. The telson may be composed of lobes fused at the base and tapering to sharp point; or the lobes may be completely fused together to form a small plate.

== Distribution and habitat ==
Stegocephalids are found worldwide, almost exclusively on deep and cold waters.

== Ecology ==
Most of the members of the family are believed to be bathypelagic and free-floating, inhabiting the oceanic water columns at depths of thousands of meters below the ocean surface. They are commonly found with oil globules just underneath their carapaces. These are believed to function as aids in making the animals more buoyant, allowing them to float in the water with little energy expenditure. The smooth, globular shape of the body helps in streamlining the animal while drifting in the water currents, further aided by the animal retracting all its appendages within its coxal plates. The more pelagic the habits of the species, the more elongated they seem to be.

Some species, however, may primarily be benthic, inhabiting the surface of the ocean floor in association with megabenthic fauna like sponges. This includes Parandaniexis mirabilis which shows evidence of being a primarily benthic micropredator of polychaetes. Their coxal plates are more reduced with more robust peropods adapted to clinging and walking than that of free-floating stegocephalids.

Stegocephalids extend their legs once resting on a substrate. In observations on captive specimens, they do not seem to have the tendency to burrow into the substrate, though this might only be because of the absence of prey in the laboratory substrates.

They are mostly predators of cnidarians, with the exception of the genus Andaniotes which are scavengers.

== Taxonomy ==
Stegocephalidae is the sole member of the superfamily Stegocephaloidea. It includes the following genera and species divided under five subfamilies:

- Subfamily Andaniopsinae Berge & Vader, 2001

- Genus Andaniopsis Sars, 1895

- Andaniopsis africana Berge, Vader & Galan, 2001
- Andaniopsis integripes (Bellan-Santini & Ledoyer, 1986)
- Andaniopsis isaki Berge, 2004
- Andaniopsis nordlandica (Boeck, 1871)
- Andaniopsis pectinata (Sars, 1883)

- Genus Steleuthera J. L. Barnard, 1964

- Steleuthera africana (Berge, Vader & Galan, 2001)
- Steleuthera ecoprophycaea Bellan-Santini & Thurston, 1996
- Steleuthera maremboca J. L. Barnard, 1964

- Subfamily Andaniexinae Berge & Vader, 2001

- Genus Andaniexis Stebbing, 1906

- Andaniexis abyssi (Boeck, 1871)
- Andaniexis americana Berge, Vader & Galan, 2001
- Andaniexis andaniexis Berge & Vader, 2003
- Andaniexis australis Barnard, 1932
- Andaniexis eilae Berge & Vader, 1997
- Andaniexis elinae Berge & Vader, 2003
- Andaniexis gloriosae Berge, Vader & Galan, 2001
- Andaniexis gracilis Berge & Vader, 1997
- Andaniexis lupus Berge & Vader, 1997
- Andaniexis mimonectes Ruffo, 1975
- Andaniexis oculata Birstein & Vinogradov, 1970
- Andaniexis ollii Berge, De Broyer & Vader, 2000
- Andaniexis pelagica Berge, Vader & Galan, 2001
- Andaniexis spinescens (Alcock, 1894)
- Andaniexis stylifer Birstein & M. Vinogradov, 1960
- Andaniexis subabyssi Birstein & M. Vinogradov, 1955

- Genus Andaniotes Stebbing, 1897

- Andaniotes abyssorum Stebbing, 1888
- Andaniotes bagabag Lowry & Stoddart, 1995
- Andaniotes islandica (Thompson, 1882)
- Andaniotes karkar Lowry & Stoddart, 1995
- Andaniotes linearis K. H. Barnard, 1932
- Andaniotes lowryi Berge, 2001
- Andaniotes pooh Berge, 2001
- Andaniotes poorei Berge, 2001
- Andaniotes pseudolinearis Berge, 2001
- Andaniotes wallaroo J. L. Barnard, 1972
- Andaniotes wollongong Berge, 2001

- Genus Glorandaniotes Ledoyer, 1986

- Glorandaniotes eilae (Berge & Vader, 1997)
- Glorandaniotes fissicaudata Ledoyer, 1986
- Glorandaniotes norae Berge & Vader, 2003
- Glorandaniotes sandroi Berge & Vader, 2003
- Glorandaniotes spongicola (Pirlot, 1933)
- Glorandaniotes traudlae Berge & Vader, 2003
- Glorandaniotes vemae Berge & Vader, 2003

- Genus Mediterexis Berge & Vader, 2001

- Mediterexis macho Berge & Vader, 2004
- Mediterexis mimonectes (Ruffo, 1975)

- Genus Metandania Stephensen, 1925

- Metandania islandica Stephensen, 1925
- Metandania tordi Berge & Vader, 2003
- Metandania wimi Berge, 2001

- Genus Parandaniexis Schellenberg, 1929

- Parandaniexis dewitti Watling & Holman, 1980
- Parandaniexis inermis Watling & Holman, 1980
- Parandaniexis mirabilis Schellenberg, 1929
- Parandaniexis pelagica (Berge, Vader & Galan, 2001)
- Parandaniexis tridentata Ledoyer, 1986

- Genus Stegosoladidus Barnard & Karaman, 1987

- Stegosoladidus antarcticus Berge, 2001
- Stegosoladidus complex Berge, 2001
- Stegosoladidus debroyeri Berge, 2001
- Stegosoladidus ingens (Chevreux, 1906e)
- Stegosoladidus simplex (K. H. Barnard, 1930)

- Subfamily Bathystegocephalinae Berge & Vader, 2001

- Genus Bathystegocephalus Schellenberg, 1926

- Bathystegocephalus globosus (Walker, 1909)

- Subfamily Parandaniinae Berge & Vader, 2001

- Genus Parandania Stebbing, 1899

- Parandania boecki (Stebbing, 1888)
- Parandania gigantea (Stebbing, 1883)
- Parandania nonhiata (Andres, 1985)

- Subfamily Stegocephalinae Dana, 1855

- Genus Alania Berge & Vader, 2001

- Alania beringi (Berge & Vader, 2001)
- Alania calypsonis (Berge, Vader & Galan, 2001)
- Alania hancocki (Hurley, 1956)

- Genus Austrocephaloides Berge & Vader, 2001

- Austrocephaloides australis (K. H. Barnard, 1916)
- Austrocephaloides boxshalli (Berge, Vader & Galan, 2001)
- Austrocephaloides camoti (J. L. Barnard, 1967)
- Austrocephaloides gunnae (Berge & Vader, 2003)
- Austrocephaloides ingstadi (Berge & Vader, 2003)
- Austrocephaloides tori (Berge & Vader, 2003)
- Austrocephaloides tucki (Berge & Vader, 2003)

- Genus Austrophippsia Berge & Vader, 2001

- Austrophippsia unihamata (Berge & Vader, 2000)

- Genus Bouscephalus Berge & Vader, 2001

- Bouscephalus mamillidacta (Moore, 1992)

- Genus Gordania Berge & Vader, 2001

- Gordania minima (J. L. Barnard, 1961)
- Gordania pajarella (J. L. Barnard, 1967)

- Genus Phippsia Stebbing, 1906

- Phippsia gibbosa (Sars, 1882)
- Phippsia roemeri Schellenberg, 1925

- Genus Pseudo Berge & Vader, 2001

- Pseudo bioice (Berge & Vader, 1997)
- Pseudo pacifica (Bulycheva, 1952)
- Pseudo pseudophippsia (Bellan-Santini, 1985)
- Pseudo vanhoeffeni (Schellenberg, 1926)
- Pseudo viscaina (J. L. Barnard, 1967)

- Genus Stegocephalexia Moore, 1992

- Stegocephalexia penelope Moore, 1992

- Genus Stegocephalina Stephensen, 1925

- Stegocephalina barnardi Berge & Vader, 2001
- Stegocephalina beringi Berge & Vader, 2001
- Stegocephalina biofar Berge & Vader, 1997
- Stegocephalina boxshalli Berge, Vader & Galan, 2001
- Stegocephalina idae Berge & Vader, 1997
- Stegocephalina ingolfi Stephensen, 1925
- Stegocephalina pacis (Bellan-Santini & Ledoyer, 1974)
- Stegocephalina trymi Berge, 2001
- Stegocephalina wagini (Gurjanova, 1936)
- Stegocephalina wolf Berge & Vader, 2004

- Genus Stegocephaloides Sars, 1895

- Stegocephaloides attingens Barnard, 1932
- Stegocephaloides auratus (Sars, 1882)
- Stegocephaloides australis K. H. Barnard, 1916
- Stegocephaloides bernardi Berge & Vader, 1997
- Stegocephaloides boxhalli Berge, Vader & Galan, 2001
- Stegocephaloides christianiensis Boeck, 1871
- Stegocephaloides gunnae Berge & Vader, 2003
- Stegocephaloides ingstadi Berge & Vader, 2003
- Stegocephaloides ledoyeri Berge, Vader & Galan, 2001
- Stegocephaloides tori Berge & Vader, 2003
- Stegocephaloides tucki Berge & Vader, 2003
- Stegocephaloides wagini (Gurjanova, 1936)

- Genus Stegocephalus Krøyer, 1842

- Stegocephalus abyssicola (Oldevig, 1959)
- Stegocephalus ampulla (Phipps, 1774)
- Stegocephalus casadiensis (Moore, 1992)
- Stegocephalus inflatus Krøyer, 1842
- Stegocephalus kergueleni (Schellenberg, 1926a)
- Stegocephalus longicornis (Gurjanova, 1962)
- Stegocephalus nipoma (J. L. Barnard, 1961)
- Stegocephalus rostrata K. H. Barnard, 1932

- Genus Stegomorphia Berge & Vader, 2001

- Stegomorphia watlingi (Berge, De Broyer & Vader, 2000)

- Genus Stegonomadia Berge & Vader, 2001

- Stegonomadia biofar (Berge & Vader, 1997)
- Stegonomadia idae (Berge & Vader, 1997)
- Stegonomadia katalia (J. L. Barnard, 1962)

- Genus Tetradeion Stebbing, 1899

- Tetradeion angustipalma (Berge & Vader, 2000)
- Tetradeion crassum (Chilton, 1883)
- Tetradeion dampieri (Berge & Vader, 2000)
- Tetradeion latus (Haswell, 1879)
- Tetradeion quatro Berge & Vader, 2000

- Subfamily incertae sedis

- Genus Glorandantiotes

- Glorandantiotes fissicaudata Ledoyer, 1986
