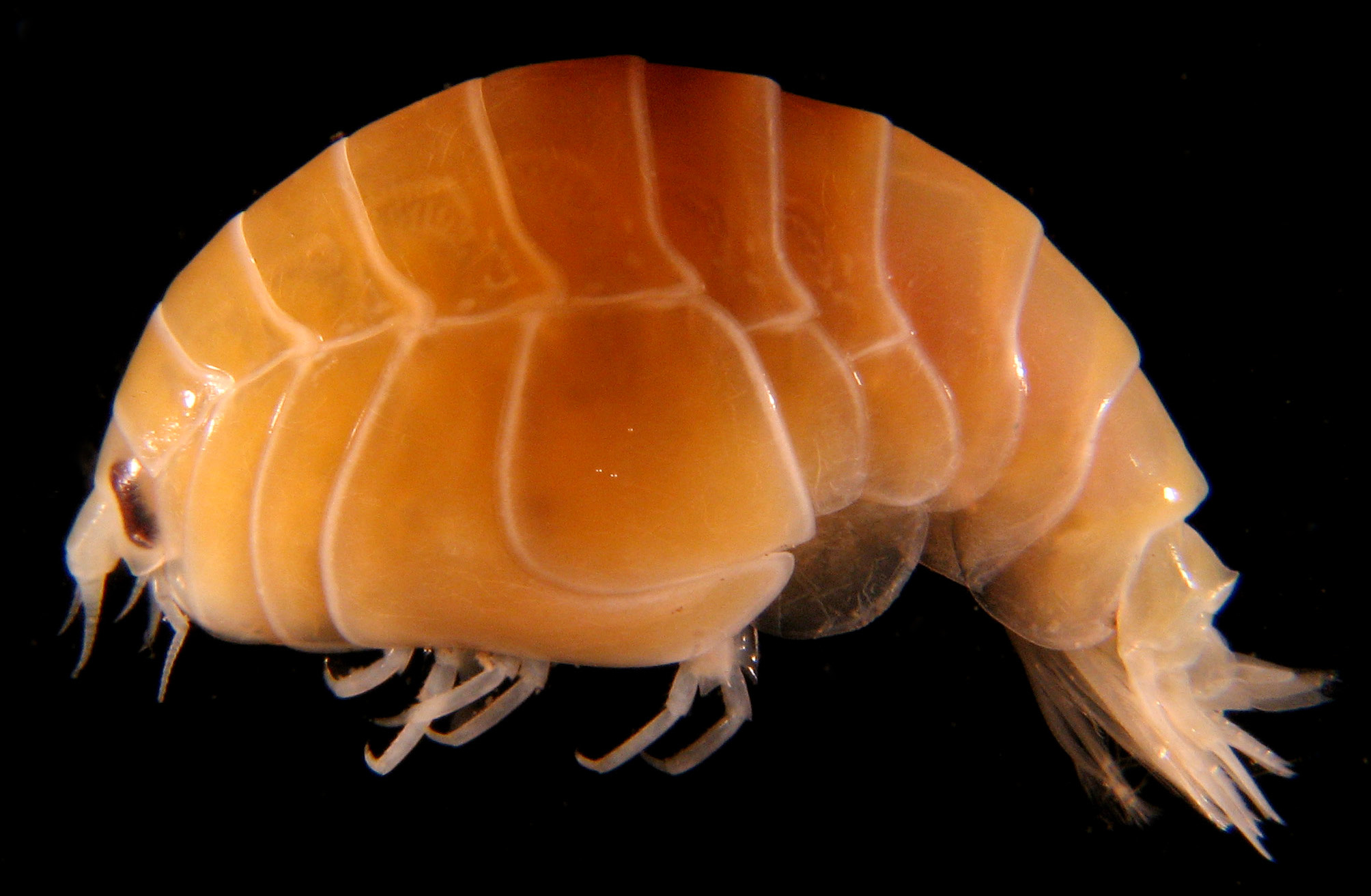
- Charcotia obesa

Scientific classification
- Kingdom: Animalia
- Phylum: Arthropoda
- Clade: Pancrustacea
- Class: Malacostraca
- Order: Amphipoda
- Suborder: Amphilochidea
- Infraorder: Lysianassida
- Parvorder: Lysianassidira
- Superfamily: Lysianassoidea
- Family: Lysianassidae; Dana, 1849

Genera
- See text

= Lysianassidae =

Family of crustaceans

Lysianassidae is a family of marine amphipods, containing the following genera:

*Acosta Özdikmen, 2012
- Aruga Holmes, 1908
- Arugella Pirlot, 1936
- Azotostoma J. L. Barnard, 1965
- Bonassa Barnard & Karaman, 1991
- Charcotia Chevreux, 1906
- Concarnes Barnard & Karaman, 1991
- Dartenassa Barnard & Karaman, 1991
- Dissiminassa Barnard & Karaman, 1991
- Douniaella Ledoyer, 1986
- Kakanui Lowry & Stoddart, 1983
- Lysianassa H. Milne Edwards, 1830
- Lysianassina A. Costa, 1867
- Lysianopsis Holmes, 1903
- Macronassa Barnard & Karaman, 1991
- Martensia Barnard & Karaman, 1991
- Nannonyx G.O. Sars, 1891
- Parawaldeckia Stebbing, 1910
- Phoxostoma K. H. Barnard, 1925
- Pronannonyx Schellenberg, 1953
- Pseudambasia Stephensen, 1927
- Riwo Lowry & Stoddart, 1995
- Shoemakerella Pirlot, 1936
- Socarnella Walker, 1904
- Socarnes Boeck, 1871
- Socarnoides Stebbing, 1888
- Socarnopsis Chevreux, 1911
- Tantena Ortiz, Lalana & Varela, 2007
- Thaumodon Lowry & Stoddart, 1995
