= Madeira Abyssal Plain =

Abyssal plain in the Canary Basin

Coordinates: 31°30′00″N 24°30′00″W

Madeira Abyssal Plain

Madeira Abyssal Plain, also called Madeira Plain, is an abyssal plain situated at the center and deepest part of the Canary Basin. It is a north-northeast to south-southeast elongated basin that almost parallels the Mid-Atlantic Ridge. Its western boundary is marked by a chain of seamounts known as the either Seewarte Seamounts or Atlantis-Great Meteor Seamount Chain. Its eastern boundary is a distinct break of slope that marks the foot of the African Continental Rise. This abyssal plain occupies an area of about 68,000 km^{2} (26,000 mi^{2}). Across this basin, slope angles are generally less than 0.01°.

== Physiographic setting ==
For research purposes, the Madeira Abyssal Plain can be divided into three sub-basins. They are a southern sub-basin, which lies at a water depth of about 5,350 meters (17,550 ft), a central sub-basin which lies at a deeper water depth of about 5,440 meters (17,850 ft), and the northern sub-basin which lies at an intermediate water depth of about 5,420 meters (17,780 ft). The central sub-basin, which is also known as Great Meteor East after a seamount situated to the west, occupies a broad area of 57,187 km^{2} (22,080 mi^{2}) and is bounded by about the 5,400 meters (17,700 ft)-contour.

The central sub-basin of the Madeira Abyssal Plain is relatively flat plain that is occasionally interrupted by small abyssal hills of a few hundred meters in height and draped by pelagic and hemipelagic sediments. These abyssal hills become more numerous to the north, south and west where they form the boundaries of the central sub-basin.

== History of Research ==
In 1980, the Nuclear Energy Agency's Seabed Working Group selected the Madeira Abyssal Plain as a site for the possible disposal of heat-emitting radioactive waste. Even though this concept was later abandoned, it resulted in this region being the location for intensive studies of its bathymetry, geology, oceanography, and biota. Since the 1980s, the Madeira Abyssal Plain has been studied in detail by the Ocean Drilling Program and research concerning the Moroccan Turbidite System.

== Geology ==
An average of 1.1 kilometers (0.68 mi) of exclusively deep-sea sediments, resting upon oceanic crust, underlies the Madeira Abyssal Plain. Seismic reflection profiles across the Canary Basin and Madeira Abyssal Plain reveal north-northeast – south-southwest ridge and trough terrain typical of oceanic crust and west-northwest – east-southeast striking fracture zone valleys that are spaced about 100 kilometers (62 mi) part. Because most of the Madeira Abyssal Plain lies within the Cretaceous Superchron, the oceanic crust underlying it cannot be precisely dated by magnetic striping. However, interpolation between recognised magnetic stripes estimated an age range of about 75 to 105 Ma for the oceanic crust underlying the central sub-basin.

Immediately overlying the oceanic crust is a layer of hemipelagic sediments. These sediments average 200 meters (660 ft) in thickness and are expected to consist predominantly of hemipelagic clay.

Overlying the hemipelagic sediments, are alternating turbidites and thin beds of pelagic sediment. These sediments initially in filled irregularities on the uneven surface of the hemipelagic sediments to produce a flat plain that later turbidites accumulated. The total thickness of turbidites that have accumulated averages 350 meters (1,150 ft) in thickness. In a few deep troughs within the oceanic crust, the total thickness of turbidites may reach 530 meters (1,740 ft). In seismic reflection, the sequence of turbidites varies from being strongly acoustically laminated near the top to poorly stratified to transparent near the base. An individual turbidite often consists of 100–200 km^{3} (24–48 mi^{3}) of sediment spread across the entire Madeira Abyssal Plain. It is typically fine-grained, except in the proximal parts of the plain. The deposition of a typical turbidite causes little or no erosion of the underlying bed. A thin bed of fine-grained, pelagic sediment typically separates successive turbidites.

Based upon composition, the turbidites have been divided into three groups. First, there are a group of organic-rich turbidites. These turbidites represent organic-rich sediments that turbidity currents transported from two sources, one north and one south of the Canary Islands. These turbidites are typically bicolored turbidite units. Their base is usually olive green where the organic material remains below surface oxidation, and their upper part is pale green where the organic material has been oxidized. Second, there are volcanic turbidites composed largely of sediment derived from either volcanic seamounts or islands. These turbidites represent the distal sediments of turbidity currents generated by massive submarine landslides resulting from the collapse of the flanks of volcanic seamounts or islands within either the Canary Islands or Madeira Archipelago. Finally, there are calcareous turbidites derived from submarine landslides effecting one of the Seewarte Seamounts to the west of the Madeira Abyssal Plain.

Thin pelagic layers separated individual turbidites. As determined by microfossils, each individual layer often represents several tens of thousands of years of pelagic sedimentation in a deep sea, abyssal environment. Depending on the carbonate compensation depth at the time of deposition, these layers consist either of calcareous ooze, marls, or clay. During the last 2.6 million years within the region of the Madeira Abyssal Plain, carbonate compensation depth has been closely controlled by the general circulation of ocean currents and has oscillated in phase with climatic shifts. During interglacial periods, the carbonate compensation depth was quite deep. This allowed for the preservation of calcareous microfossils, e.g. foraminifera and coccoliths, in the Madeira Abyssal Plain and the formation of calcareous ooze. Conversely, during glacial periods, and prior to 2.6 million years ago, the carbonate compensation depth was shallower. This leads either to poor preservation of calcareous microfossils and frequently no preservation of them at all and, respectively, the accumulation of either marl or clay to form pelagic layers.
