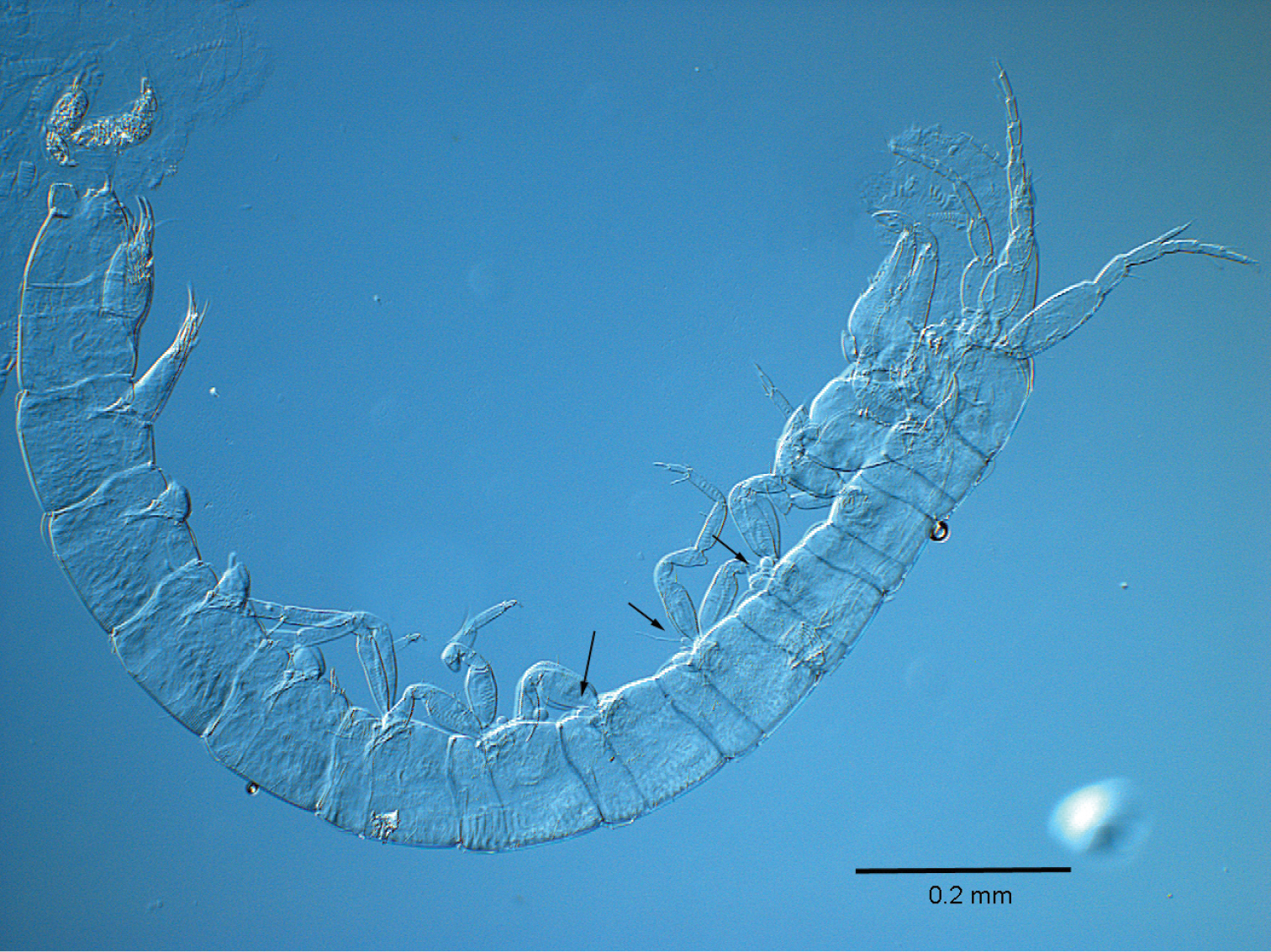

Scientific classification
- Kingdom: Animalia
- Phylum: Arthropoda
- Clade: Pancrustacea
- Class: Malacostraca
- Order: Ingolfiellida
- Suborder: Ingolfiellidea
- Family: Ingolfiellidae; Hansen, 1903

= Ingolfiellidae =

Family of crustaceans

Ingolfiellidae is a family of Ingolfiellidan crustaceans, comprising the following genera:

- Ingolfiella Hansen, 1903
- Proleleupia Vonk & Schram, 2003
- Rapaleleupia Vonk & Schram, 2007
- Stygobarnardia Ruffo, 1985
- Trogloleleupia Ruffo, 1974
