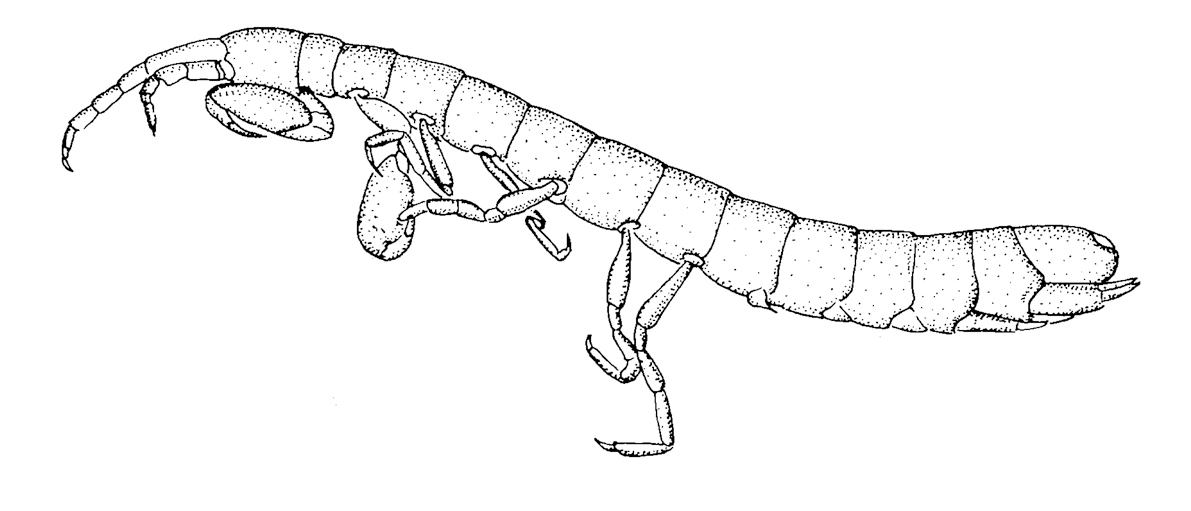
- Ingolfiella ischitana

Scientific classification
- Kingdom: Animalia
- Phylum: Arthropoda
- Clade: Pancrustacea
- Class: Malacostraca
- Order: Ingolfiellida; Hansen, 1903
- Suborder: Ingolfiellidea
- Infraorder: Ingolfiellidamorpha

Families
- Ingolfiellidae Hansen, 1903; Metaingolfiellidae Ruffo, 1969

= Ingolfiellida =

Order of crustaceans

Ingolfiellida is an order of Peracaridan crustaceans, containing one suborder, Ingolfiellidea; both of these are monotypic, containing just one subordinate group. Subordinate to these is infraorder Ingolfiellidamorpha.

The two families, Ingolfiellidae and Metaingolfiellidae, are each considered to belong to their own monotypic parvorders and superfamilies. Over 30 species are known from the two families. These animals are small, vermiform (worm-like) crustaceans that live "in the soft mud of the deep-sea floor, as well as in high mountain freshwater riverbeds, or in subterranean fresh, brackish, and marine interstitial waters of continental ground waters and continental shelves".

This taxon was previously considered a suborder of amphipods, but in 2017 it was deemed distinct enough to be elevated into a separate order. The order's diagnosis noted several diagnostic traits, such as vestigial stalked eyes, the first and second pairs of gnathopods being "eucarpochelate", (Note: This is to say a reduced propodus that forms a "dactylar complex" with the dactylus; these are close to an expanded carpus.) the pleosome possessing 6 "relatively undifferentiated" segments, a lack of epimera, and reduced pleopods and uropods.
