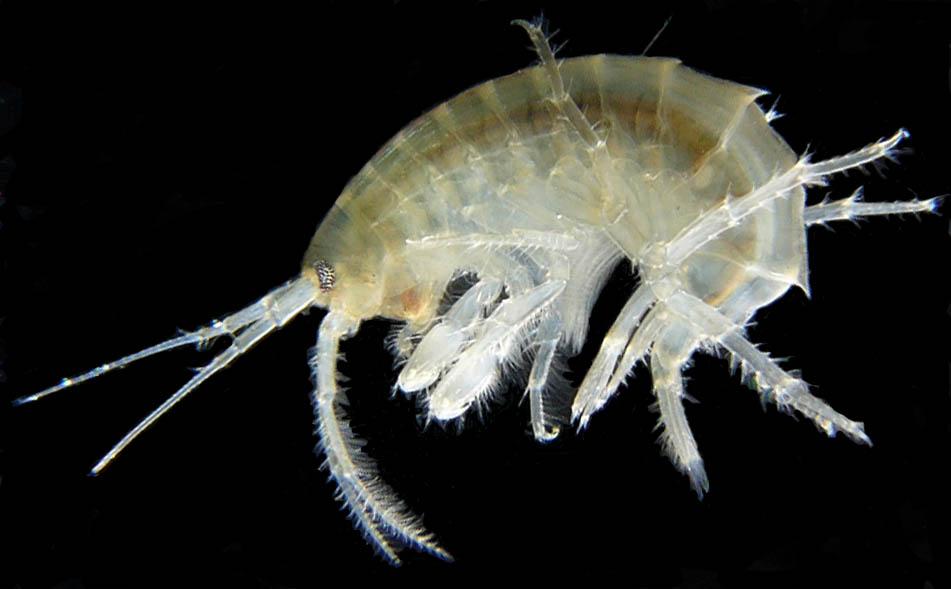
- Gammarus roeselii

Scientific classification
- Kingdom: Animalia
- Phylum: Arthropoda
- Clade: Pancrustacea
- Class: Malacostraca
- Subclass: Eumalacostraca
- Superorder: Peracarida
- Order: Amphipoda; Latreille, 1816

Suborders
- See text

= Amphipoda =

Amphipoda Temporal range: Hauterivian–Recent

Order of malacostracan crustaceans

Amphipoda (/æmˈfɪpədə/) is an order of malacostracan crustaceans characterized by sessile eyes and the absence of a carapace. Amphipods (/ˈæmfɪpɒdz/) comprise more than 10,700 species, are found in almost all aquatic environments, from fresh water to the deepest parts of the ocean, as well as in terrestrial environments, and generally have laterally compressed bodies.

Most amphipods are marine, although around 20% of species inhabit fresh water and other non-marine environments, while the family Talitridae includes terrestrial landhoppers as well as semi-terrestrial and marine species. Amphipods range in size from less than 1 millimetre (0.04 in) to about 35 centimetres (13.8 in), are mostly detritivores or scavengers, and are an important component of aquatic ecosystems.

== Description ==
=== Anatomy ===
Anatomical diagram of the gammaridean amphipod Leucothoe incisa

Amphipods are characterized by sessile eyes (without eyestalks), no carapace, and the presence of gills on the coxae. Their bodies are divided into 13 segments, which can be grouped into the head, thorax and abdomen.

The head is fused to the thorax, and bears two pairs of antennae and one pair of compound eyes. It also carries the mouthparts, but these are mostly concealed. Amphipods are one of the few groups to possess gnathopods, which are uniquely modified feeding legs.

The thorax and abdomen are usually quite distinct and bear different kinds of legs; they are typically laterally compressed. The thorax bears eight pairs of uniramous appendages, the first of which are used as accessory mouthparts; the next four pairs are directed forwards, and the last three pairs are directed backwards. Gills are present on the thoracic segments, and there is an open circulatory system with a heart, using haemocyanin to carry oxygen in the haemolymph to the tissues. The uptake and excretion of salts is controlled by special glands on the antennae.

The abdomen is divided into two sections comprising three segments each: the pleosome which bears swimming legs, and the urosome, which comprises a telson and three pairs of uropods which do not form a tail fan as they do in animals such as true shrimp. Furthermore, amphipods are the only malacostracan crustaceans that possess more than one pair of uropods. Both of these limb types are usually well-developed. Epimera are present on the abdomen.

Some amphipods possess aberrant body plans, such as the elongate skeleton shrimp (Caprellidae) and Macrohectopus (Macrohectopidae).

=== Size ===
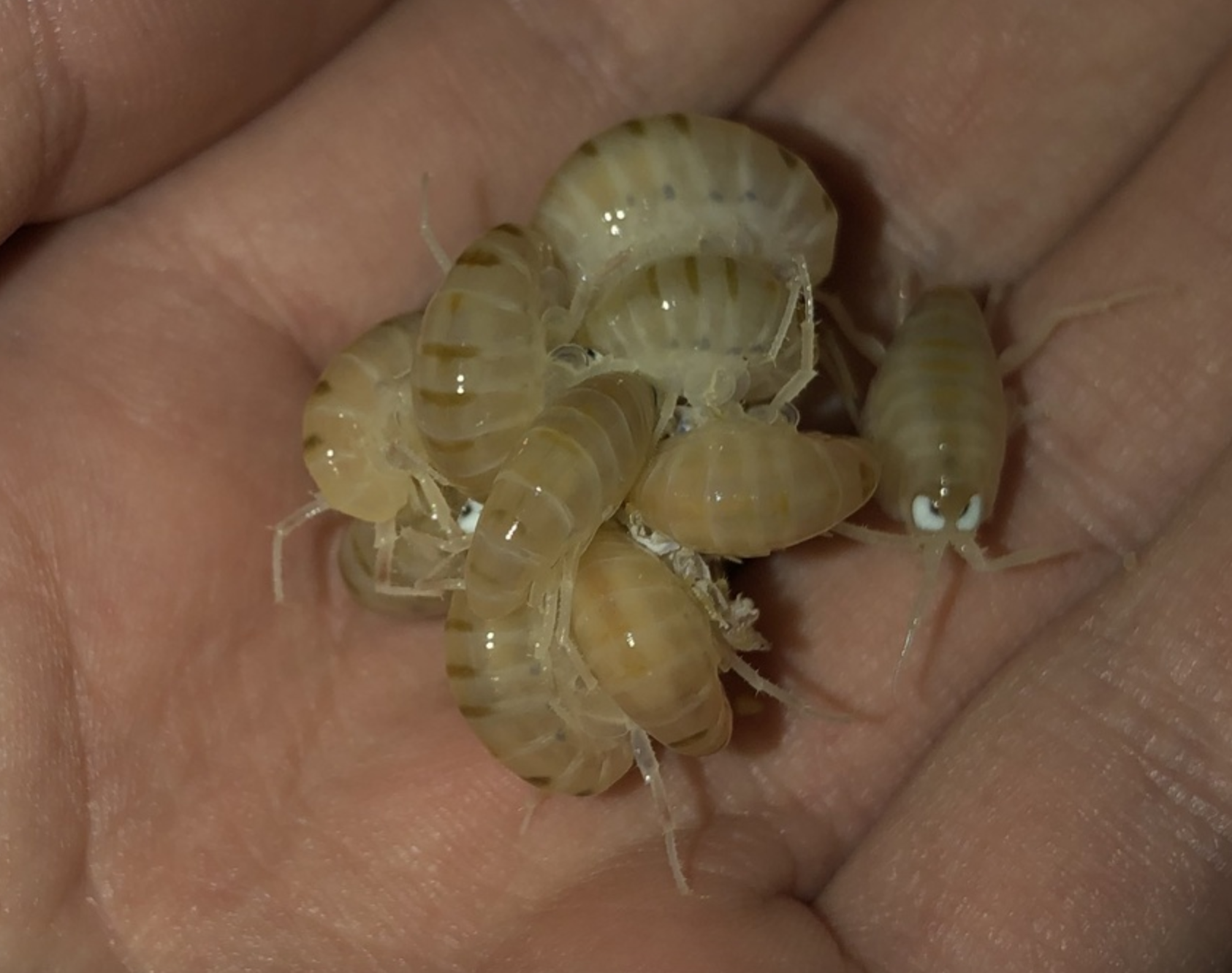
Americorchestia sp.; Talitridae

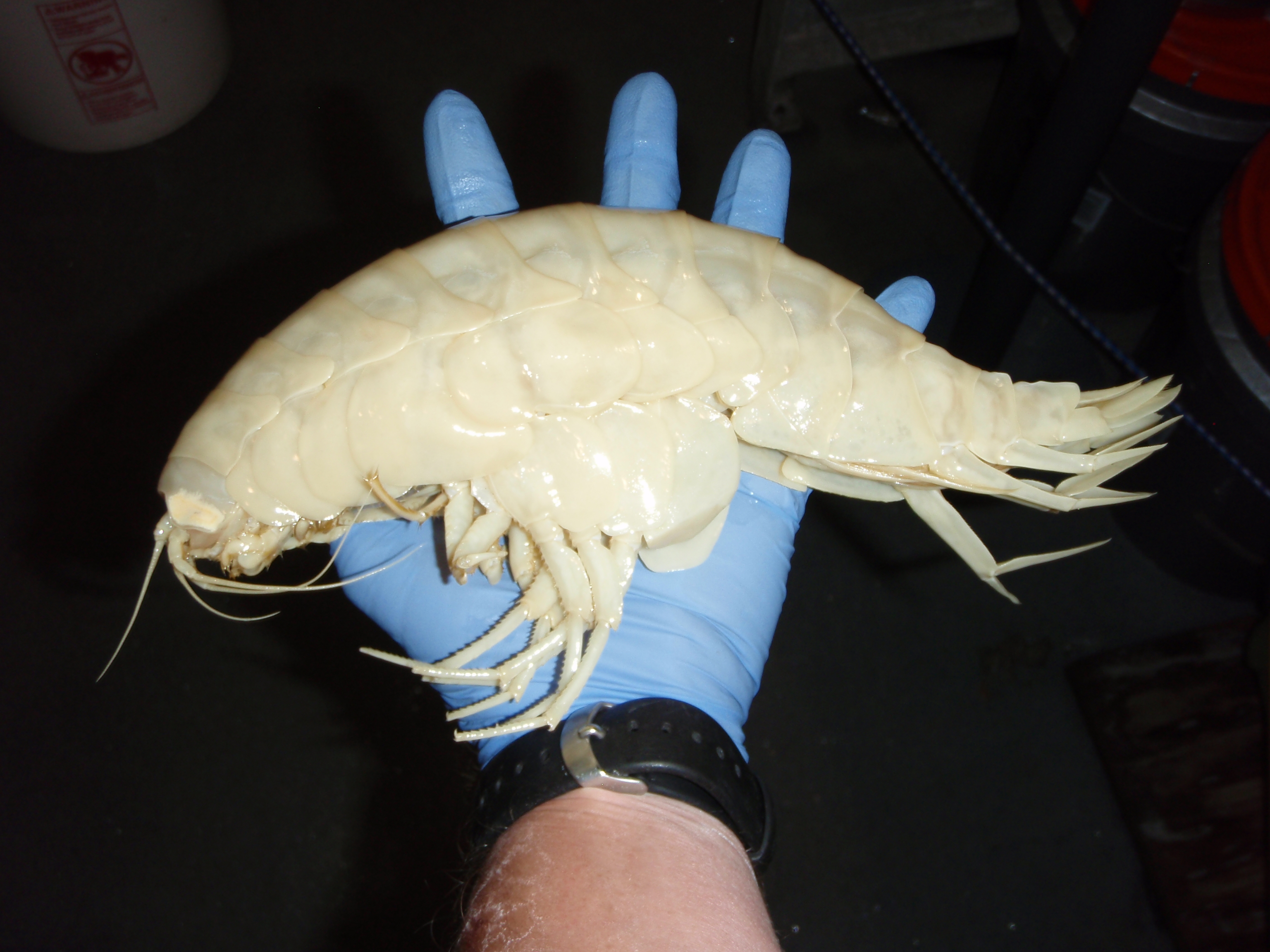
Alicella gigantea; Alicellidae

Amphipods in hands

Amphipods are typically less than 10 millimetres (0.4 in) long, but the largest known amphipods are much larger; specimens of Alicella gigantea collected from 5,300 metres (17,400 ft) deep are 27–28 cm (10.6–11.0 in) long, reconstructed gut contents from a black-footed albatross indicates 34 centimetres (13 in), and photographed animals from the Kermadec Trench indicate lengths of up to 34.9 centimetres (13.7 in). The smallest known amphipods are less than 1 millimetre (0.04 in) long. The size of amphipods is limited by the availability of dissolved oxygen, such that the amphipods in Lake Titicaca at an altitude of 3,800 metres (12,500 ft) can only grow up to 22 millimetres (0.87 in), compared to lengths of 90 millimetres (3.5 in) in Lake Baikal at 455 metres (1,500 ft). However, in Baikal amphipods this relationship appears to be more complex: body size is also associated with distinct bathymetric assemblages, and both dwarf and giant forms occur across all depth zones.

Some amphipods exhibit sexual dimorphism. In dimorphic species, males are usually larger than females, although this is reversed in the genus Crangonyx.

=== Reproduction and life cycle ===
Depicts a male (top) and female (bottom) amphipod during amplexus

Amphipods engage in amplexus, a precopulatory guarding behavior in which males will grasp a female with their gnathopods and carry the female held against their ventral surface. Amplexus can last from two to over fifteen days, depending on water temperature, and ends when the female molts, at which point her eggs are ready for fertilisation.

Mature females bear a marsupium, or brood pouch, which holds her eggs while they are fertilised, and until the young are ready to hatch. As a female ages, she produces more eggs in each brood. Mortality is around 25–50% for the eggs. There are no larval stages; the eggs hatch directly into a juvenile form, and sexual maturity is generally reached after six moults. Some species have been known to eat their own exuviae after moulting.

== Ecology ==
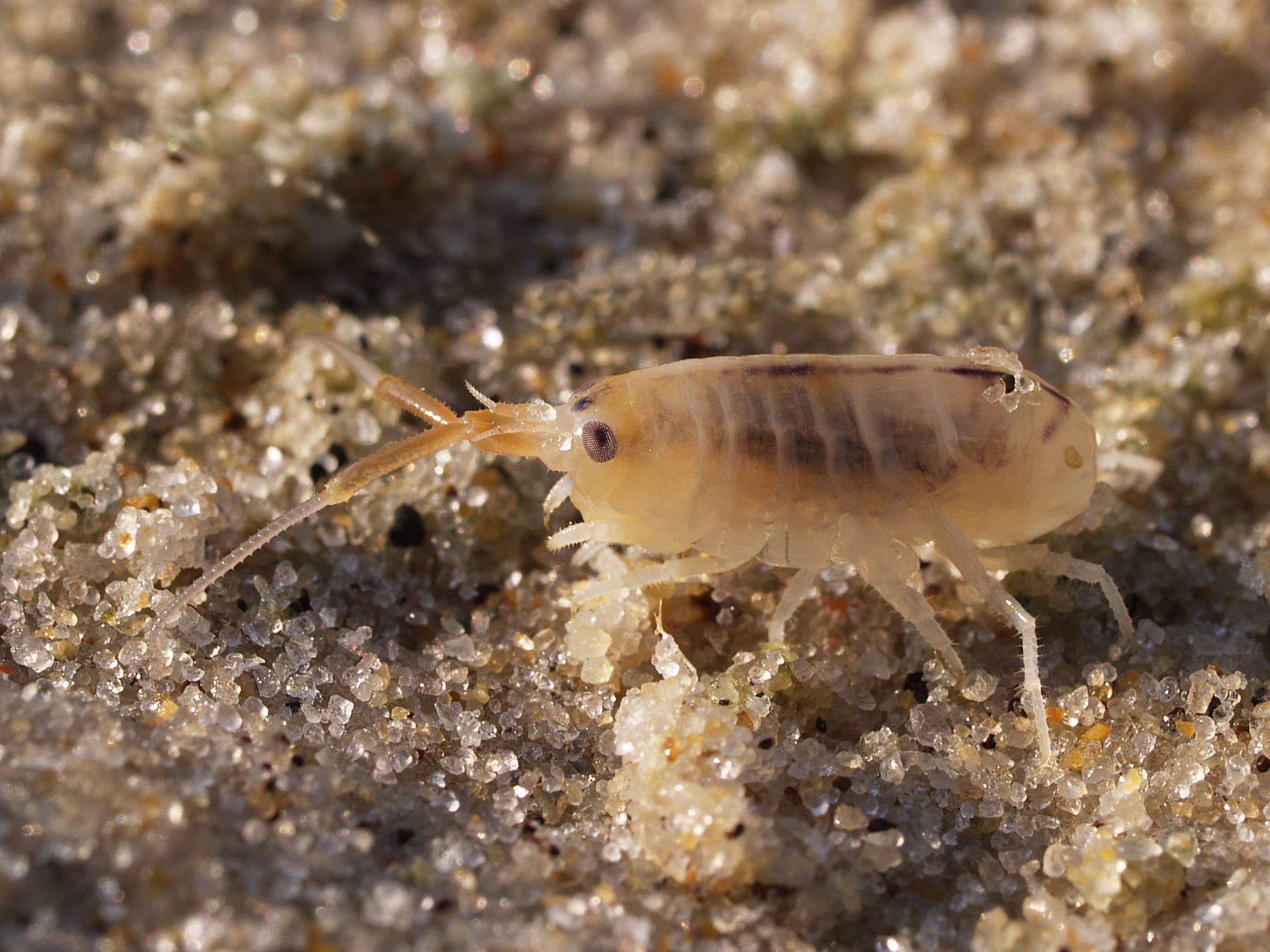
Talitrus saltator is an abundant animal of sandy beaches around Europe.

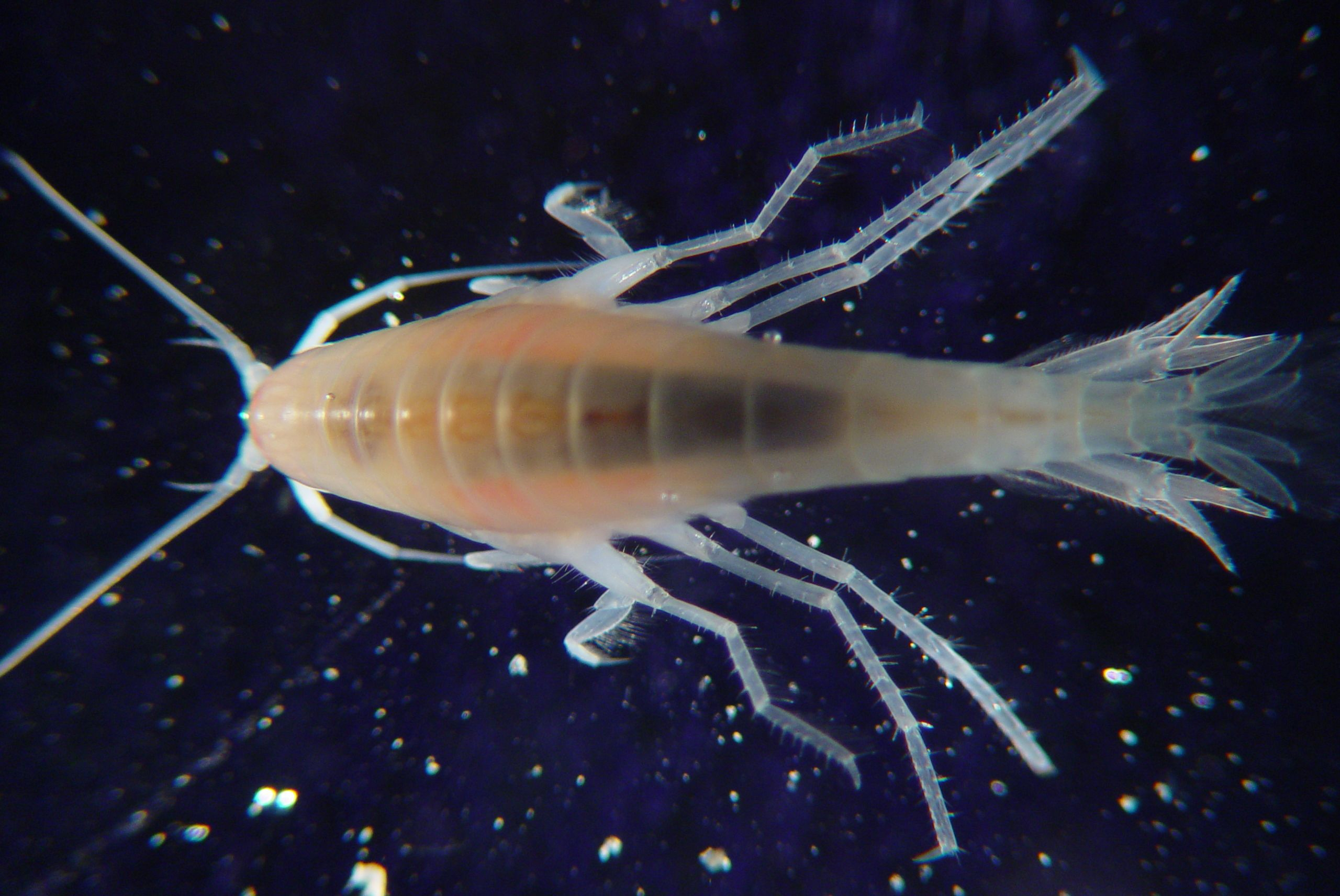
Dorsal (top) view of an amphipod living in a commensal relationship with a bamboo coral (Keratoisis flexibilis)

Amphipods are found in almost all aquatic environments, from fresh water to water with twice the salinity of sea water and even in the Challenger Deep, the deepest known point in the ocean. They are almost always an important component of aquatic ecosystems, often acting as mesograzers; a monograph calls them ″integral members of global marine ecosystems″.

Most species in the suborder Gammaridea are epibenthic, although they are often collected in plankton samples. Members of the Hyperiidea are all planktonic and marine; many are symbionts of gelatinous animals, including salps, medusae, siphonophores, colonial radiolarians and ctenophores, and most hyperiids are associated with gelatinous animals during some part of their life cycle.

Some 1,900 species, or 20% of the total amphipod diversity, live in fresh water or other non-marine waters. Notably rich endemic amphipod faunas are found in the ancient Lake Baikal and waters of the Caspian Sea basin, with over 350 species inhabiting Lake Baikal.

The landhoppers of the family Talitridae (which also includes semi-terrestrial and marine animals) are terrestrial, living in damp environments such as leaf litter. Landhoppers have a wide distribution in areas that were formerly part of Gondwana, but have colonised parts of Europe and North America in recent times.

Around 750 species in 160 genera and 30 families are troglobitic and live in caves, and are found in almost all suitable habitats, but with their centres of diversity in the Mediterranean Basin, southeastern North America and the Caribbean.

Amphipods are a potential means of mitigating eutrophication in aquaculture facilities.

Compared to other crustacean groups, such as the Isopoda, Rhizocephala or Copepoda, relatively few amphipods are parasitic on other animals. The most notable example of parasitic amphipods are the whale lice (family Cyamidae). Unlike other amphipods, these are dorso-ventrally flattened, and have large, strong claws, with which they attach themselves to baleen whales. They are the only parasitic crustaceans which cannot swim during any part of their life cycle.

=== Foraging behaviour ===
Most amphipods are detritivores or scavengers, with some being grazers of algae, omnivores or predators of small insects and crustaceans. Food is grasped with the front two pairs of legs, which are armed with large claws. More immobile species of amphipods eat higher quantities of less nutritious food rather than actively seeking more nutritious food. This is a type of compensatory feeding. This behaviour may have evolved to minimise predation risk when searching for other foods. Ampithoe longimana, for example, is more sedentary than other species and have been observed to remain on host plants longer. In fact, when presented with both high- and low-nutrition food options, the sedentary species Ampithoe longimana does not distinguish between the two options. Other amphipod species, such as Gammarus mucronatus and Elasmopus levis, which have superior predator avoidance and are more mobile, are better able to pursue different food sources. In species without the compensatory feeding ability, survivorship, fertility, and growth can be strongly negatively affected in the absence of high-quality food. Compensatory feeding may also explain the year-round presence of A. longimana in certain waters. Because algal presence changes throughout the year in certain communities, the evolution of flexible feeding techniques such as compensatory feeding may have been beneficial to survival.

Ampithoe longimana has been observed to avoid certain compounds when foraging for food. In response to this avoidance, species of seaweed such as Dictyopteris membranacea or Dictyopteris hoytii have evolved to produce C_{11} sulfur compounds and C-9 oxo-acids in their bodies as defence mechanisms that specifically deter amphipods instead of deterrence to consumption by other predators.

In populations found in benthic ecosystems, amphipods play an essential role in controlling brown algae growth. The mesograzer behaviour of amphipods greatly contributes to the suppression of brown algal dominance in the absence of amphipod predators. Amphipods display a strong preference for brown algae in benthic ecosystems, but due to removal of mesograzers by predators such as fish, brown algae is able to dominate these communities over green and red algae species.

The incidence of cannibalism and intraguild predation is relatively high in some species, although adults may decrease cannibalistic behaviour directed at juveniles when they are likely to encounter their own offspring. In addition to age, sex may affect cannibalistic behaviour as males cannibalised newly moulted females less than males.

They have, rarely, been identified as feeding on humans; in Melbourne in 2017 a boy who stood in the sea for about half an hour had severe bleeding from wounds on his legs that did not coagulate easily. This was found to have been caused by "sea fleas" identified as lysianassid amphipods, possibly in a feeding group. Their bites are not venomous and do not cause lasting damage.

== Nomenclature ==
The name Amphipoda comes, via Neo-Latin amphipoda, from the Greek roots ἀμφί 'on both/all sides' and πούς 'foot'. This contrasts with the related Isopoda, which have a single kind of thoracic leg. Particularly among anglers, amphipods are known as freshwater shrimp, scuds, or sideswimmers. The common names relate to their swimming habits, described as "scudding" and often having the animal tilt to one side.

=== Taxonomy ===
Over 10,700 species of amphipods are currently recognised. The higher taxonomy of Amphipoda has been thoroughly rearranged in the 21st century, and currently comprises six suborders:

- Amphilochidea (89 families; 700 genera; 4,308 species)
- Colomastigidea (2 families; 3 genera; 60 species)
- Hyperiidea (35 families; 76 genera; 284 species)
- Hyperiopsidea (3 families; 5 genera; 15 species)
- Pseudingolfiellidea (1 families; 1 genera; 4 species)
- Senticaudata (109 families; 983 genera; 6,007 species)
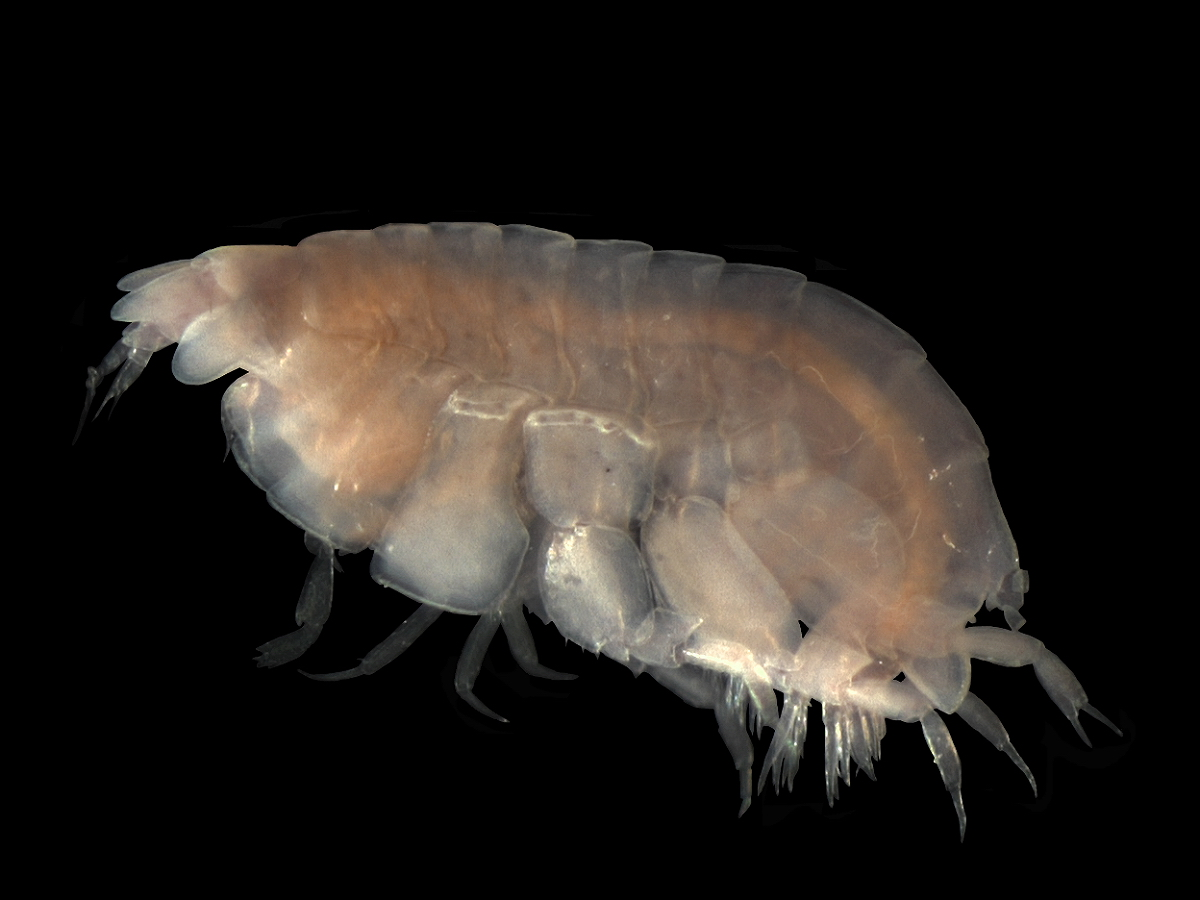
Lepidepecreum longicorne (Amphilochidea: Lysianassidae)

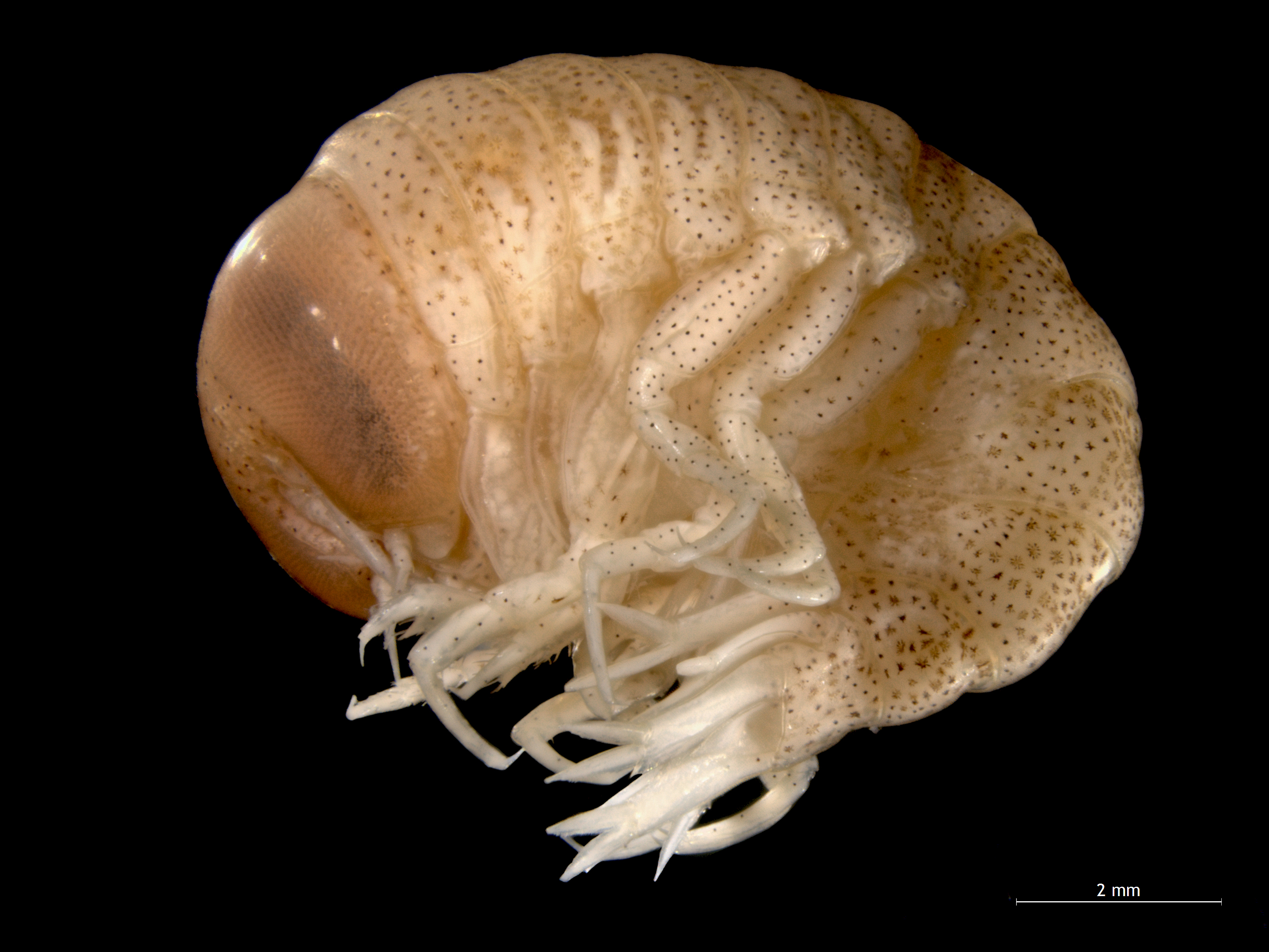
Hyperia galba (Hyperiidea: Hyperiidae)

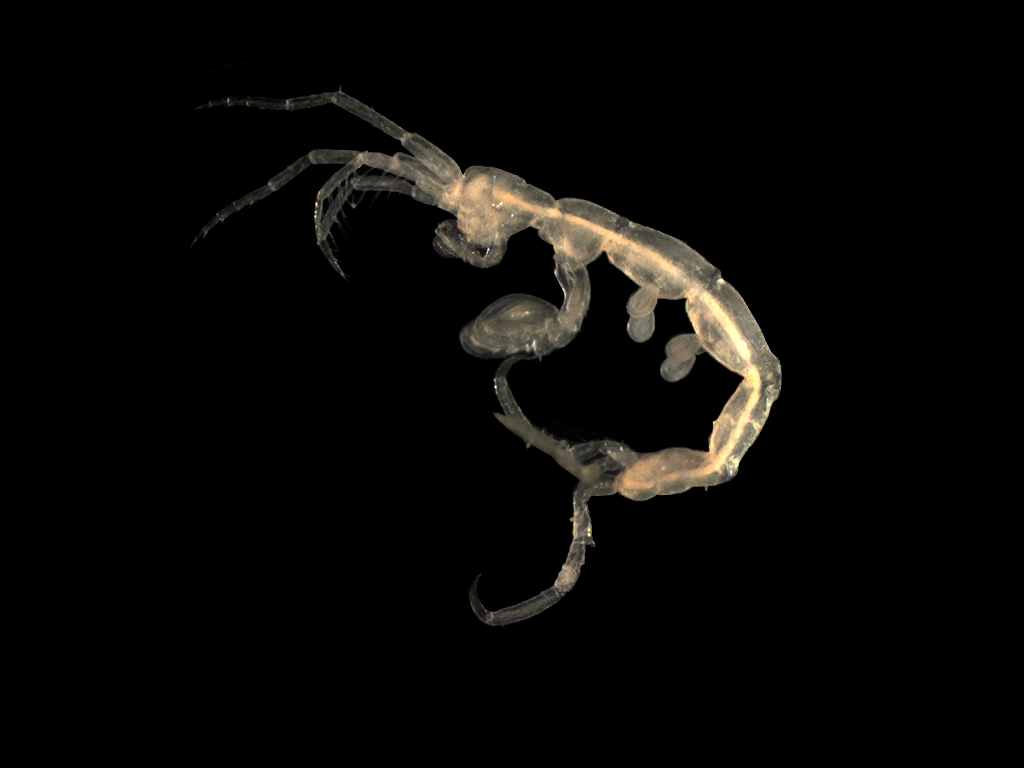
Pariambus typicus (Senticaudata: Caprellidae)

A previous classification comprised the four suborders Gammaridea, Caprellidea, Hyperiidea, and Ingolfiellidea, of which Gammaridea contained the majority of taxa, including all the freshwater and terrestrial species. Gammaridea was recognised as a phylogenetically problematic group, and a new classification was developed by James K. Lowry and Alan Myers in a series of works over 2003–2017, using cladistic analysis of morphological characters. It started with breaking up and replacing Gammaridea. The largest of the new suborders, Senticaudata, comprises over half of the known amphipod species, including practically all freshwater taxa. At the same time, Ingolfiellidea was split from Amphipoda and reclassified as order Ingolfiellida. The more recent work of Copilaş-Ciocianu et al. (2020) using analysis of molecular data found general support for three major groups corresponding to suborders Amphilochidea, Hyperiidea and Senticaudata, but suggests some groups need to move between Amphilochidea and Senticaudata in a taxonomic revision.

New Amphipoda classification of Lowry and Myers

______________Suborder________Infraorder_______Parvorder_______Superfamily____
- Amphipoda
  - - Pseudingolfiellidea
      - Pseudingolfiellida
        - Pseudingolfielloidea
  - - - Hyperiidea
        - Physosomata
          - - Lanceoloidea
            - Scinoidea
        - Physocephalata
          - - Vibilioidea
            - - Phronimoidea
              - Platysceloidea
    - - - Colomastigidea
          - Colomastigida
            - - Colomastigoidea
              - Pagetinoidea
        - Hyperiopsidea
          - Hyperiopsida
            - - Podosiroidea
              - Hyperiopsoidea
      - - Senticaudata
          - - Carangoliopsida
              - - Carangoliopsoidea
          - - - Talitrida
                - - Biancolinoidea
                  - Caspicoloidea
                  - Kurioidea
                  - Talitroidea
            - - - Hadziida
                  - - Calliopioidea
                    - Hadzioidea
                - Corophiida
                  - Corophiidira
                    - Aoroidea
                    - Cheluroidea
                    - Chevalioidea
                    - Corophioidea
                  - Caprellidira
                    - Aetiopedesoidea
                    - Isaeoidea
                    - Microprotopoidea
                    - Neomegamphoidea
                    - Photoidea
                    - Rakirooidea
                    - Caprelloidea
              - - Bogidiellida
                  - - Bogidielloidea
                - Gammarida
                  - Gammaridira
                    - Gammaroidea
                  - Crangonyctidira
                    - Allocrangonyctoidea
                    - Crangonyctoidea
        - Amphilochidea
          - Amphilochida
            - - - Maxillipioidea
            - - - - Oedicerotoidea
              - - Eusiridira
                  - Liljeborgioidea
                  - Eusiroidea
                - Amphilochidira
                  - Amphilochoidea
                  - - Leucothoidea
                    - Iphimedioidea
          - Lysianassida
            - - Dexaminoidea
            - - - Synopioidea
              - - - Haustorioidea
                - Lysianassidira
                  - Alicelloidea
                  - - Stegocephaloidea
                    - - Lysianassoidea
                      - Aristioidea

=== Fossil record ===
Amphipods are thought to have originated in the Lower Carboniferous. Despite the group's age, however, the fossil record of the order Amphipoda is meagre, comprising specimens of one species from the Lower Cretaceous (Hauterivian) Weald Clay (United Kingdom) and 12 species dating back only as far as the Upper Eocene, where they have been found in Baltic amber.
