= Protamphisopus wianamattensis =

Protamphisopus wianamattensis Temporal range: Middle Triassic (mid-Anisian), 247–242 Ma

Scientific classification
- Kingdom: Animalia
- Phylum: Arthropoda
- Clade: Pancrustacea
- Class: Malacostraca
- Order: Isopoda
- Suborder: Phreatoicidea
- Family: Amphisopodidae
- Genus: †Protamphisopus
- Species: †P. wianamattensis

Binomial name
- †Protamphisopus wianamattensis (Chilton, 1918)

Synonyms
- Phreatoicus wianamattensis Chilton, 1918

Extinct species of crustacean

Protamphisopus wianamattensis is an extinct species of phreatoicidean isopod from the Middle Triassic period (mid-Anisian age). Fossils have been recovered from the Wianamatta Group in New South Wales, Australia. It is the earliest known freshwater representative of the suborder Phreatoicidea.

== Discovery and naming ==
The species was described in 1918 by New Zealand zoologist Charles Chilton, who placed it in the extant genus Phreatoicus as Phreatoicus wianamattensis. In 1943, George E. Nicholls established the genus Protamphisopus and designated the species as its type species.

The specific epithet wianamattensis refers to the Wianamatta Group, where the fossil material was discovered.

== Stratigraphy and paleoenvironment ==
Fossils of P. wianamattensis occur within the basal section of the Ashfield Shale, the lowest unit of the Middle Triassic Wianamatta Group in the Sydney Basin near Newtown, Australia. They are found within thin, sideritic layers of the Rouse Hill Siltstone member, which consists of dark gray to black carbonaceous shale and silty claystone.

Older Paleozoic phreatoicideans, such as the Palaeophreatoicidae, inhabited marine or estuarine environments. The associated fauna of the Ashfield Shale—including fish, amphibians, insects, and unionid bivalves—indicates a freshwater, lacustrine depositional environment.

== Phylogeny and morphology ==
In 2003, George D. F. Wilson and Gregory Edgecombe redescribed P. wianamattensis and included it in a cladistic analysis of the Phreatoicidea. The analysis placed Protamphisopus within the crown-group Phreatoicidea, closely related to the modern family Amphisopodidae.
