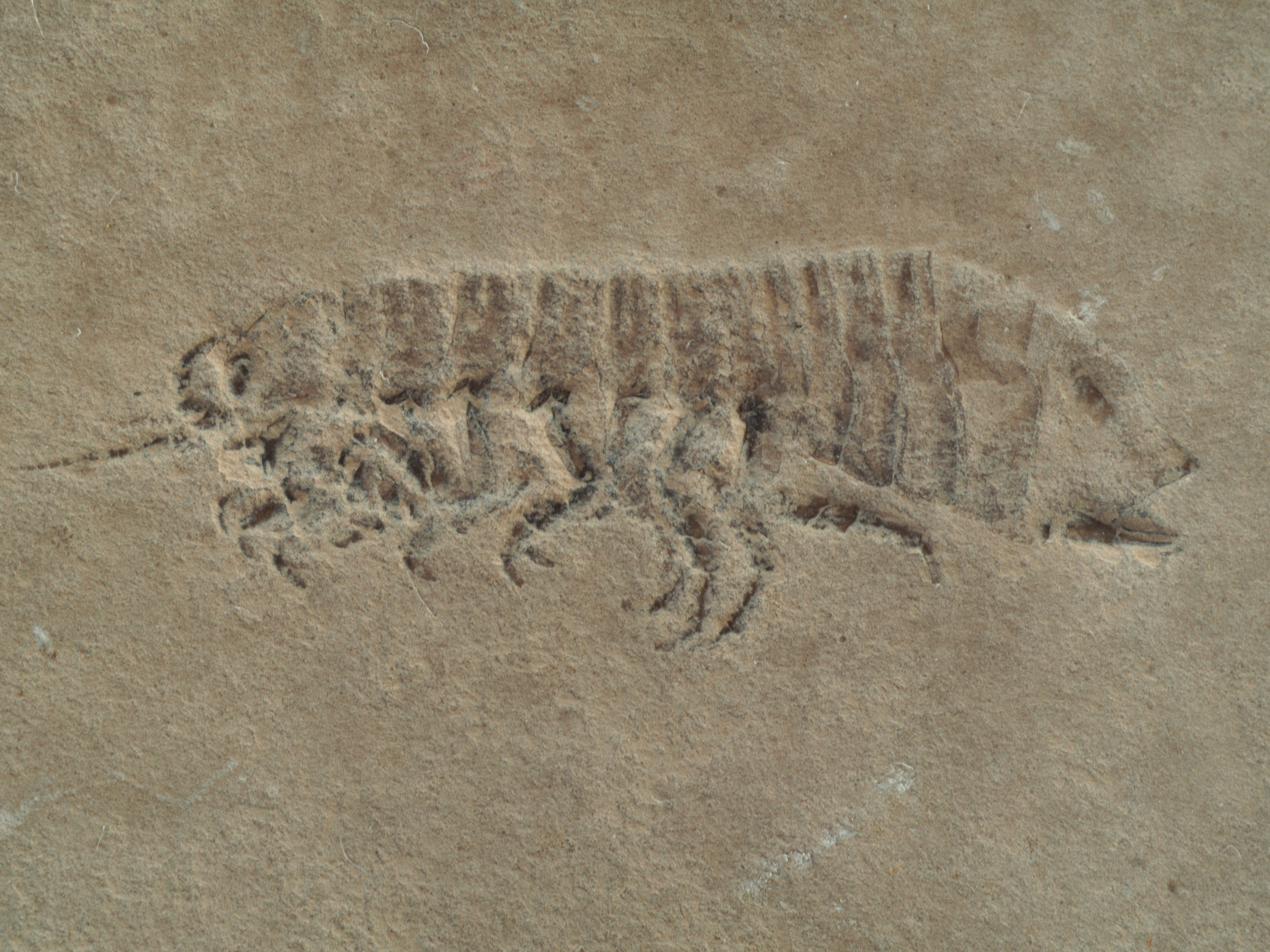
- Protamphisopus baii fossil from the Guanling Formation

Scientific classification
- Kingdom: Animalia
- Phylum: Arthropoda
- Clade: Pancrustacea
- Class: Malacostraca
- Order: Isopoda
- Suborder: Phreatoicidea
- Family: Amphisopodidae
- Genus: †Protamphisopus
- Species: †P. baii

Binomial name
- †Protamphisopus baii Fu & Wilson, 2010

= Protamphisopus baii =

Protamphisopus baii Temporal range: 247–242 Ma Middle Triassic

Species of extinct fossil isopod

Protamphisopus baii is an extinct species of phreatoicidean isopod that lived during the Anisian age of the Middle Triassic period. Fossil specimens have been recovered from the Guanling Formation of the Luoping Fauna in Yunnan Province, China.

== Description ==
The body of P. baii was laterally compressed like many members of the isopod suborder Phreatoicidea. The dorsal surface of the head features a lateral profile that is smoothly curved and lacks surface nodules. The eyes are present, sessile, and project slightly forward in an approximately rounded shape. Fully developed adults reached lengths of approximately 1 inch (2.5 cm).

The pereon (torso) is characterized by transverse rounded ridges running toward the center of each segment, with more than one ridge present on individual segments. The pleon (abdomen) region is much deeper in lateral profile than the preceding thoracic segments, ending in a smoothly curved pleotelson posterior margin that completely lacks a median lobe.
