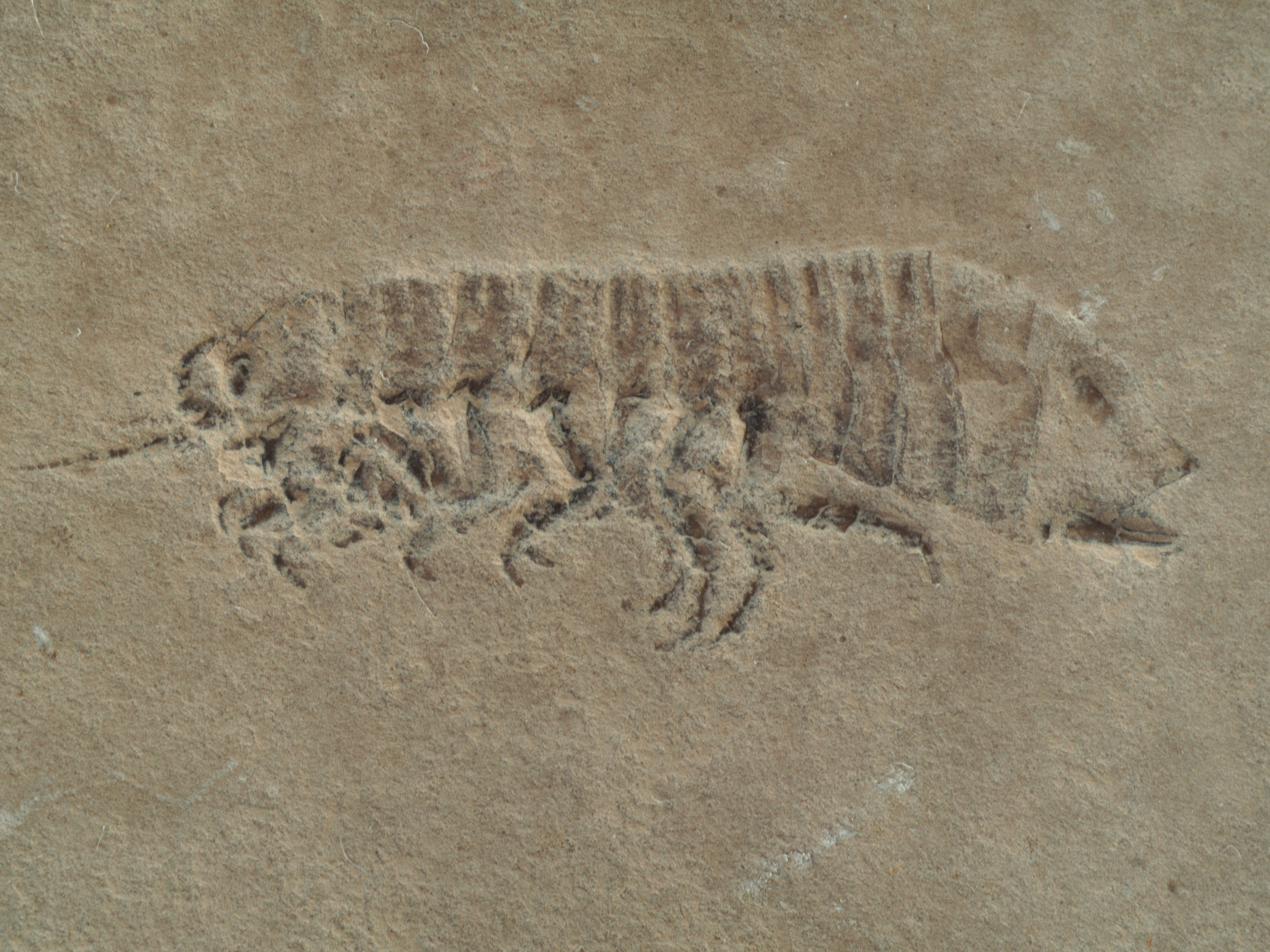
- Protamphisopus baii fossil from the Guanling Formation

Scientific classification
- Kingdom: Animalia
- Phylum: Arthropoda
- Clade: Pancrustacea
- Class: Malacostraca
- Order: Isopoda
- Suborder: Phreatoicidea
- Family: Amphisopodidae
- Genus: †Protamphisopus; Nicholls, 1943

Type species
- †Phreatoicus wianamattensis Chilton, 1918

= Protamphisopus =

Protamphisopus Temporal range: 255–240 Ma Permian–Triassic

Fossil genus of isopods

Protamphisopus is a genus of extinct phreatoicidean freshwater isopods from the Permian and Triassic periods.

== Taxonomy ==
Three species are currently placed in Protamphisopus:

- Protamphisopus baii Fu & Wilson, 2010 (Middle Triassic Yunnan, China)
- Protamphisopus reichelti Malzahn in Glaessner & Malzahn, 1962 (Lopingian Lower Rhine, Germany)
- Protamphisopus wianamattensis (Chilton, 1918) (Wianamatta Group near Newtown, Australia)

The genus appears to be paraphyletic, with the Late Permian species Protamphisopus reichelti likely belonging to stem group Palaeophreatoicidae and the Triassic species Protamphisopus baii and Protamphisopus wianamattensis likely belonging to Amphisopidae in crown group Phreatoicidea.
