= Emathia =

Emathia was an ancient region in Lower Macedonia, in ancient Greece.

Emathia may also refer to:

- Imathia, a modern regional unit in Central Macedonia, Greece
- Emathia (cicada), an insect
- Oesyme, a town of ancient Thrace later renamed to Emathia

== See also ==
- Amathia (disambiguation)
