= Protamphisopus reichelti =

Protamphisopus reichelti Temporal range: 259–252 Ma Late Permian

Scientific classification
- Kingdom: Animalia
- Phylum: Arthropoda
- Clade: Pancrustacea
- Class: Malacostraca
- Order: Isopoda
- Suborder: Phreatoicidea
- Family: Amphisopodidae
- Genus: †Protamphisopus
- Species: †P. reichelti

Binomial name
- †Protamphisopus reichelti Glaessner & Malzahn, 1962

Fossil species of isopod

Protamphisopus reichelti is an extinct species of phreatoicidean isopod belonging to the family Amphisopodidae that lived during the Late Permian period. Fossil specimens of this species have been recovered from the marine copper-shale deposits of the Zechstein formation located within the Lower Rhine region of Germany.

== Taxonomy ==
The species was originally described in 1962 by German paleontologists Martin Glaessner and Erich Malzahn. It represents one of the earliest documented geological records of the genus Protamphisopus found within continental Europe. Subsequent cladistic comparisons of primitive phreatoicidean lineages by George Wilson and Gregory Edgecombe have further evaluated the anatomical characteristics of the fossil material to verify its morphological placement alongside related Triassic taxa.
