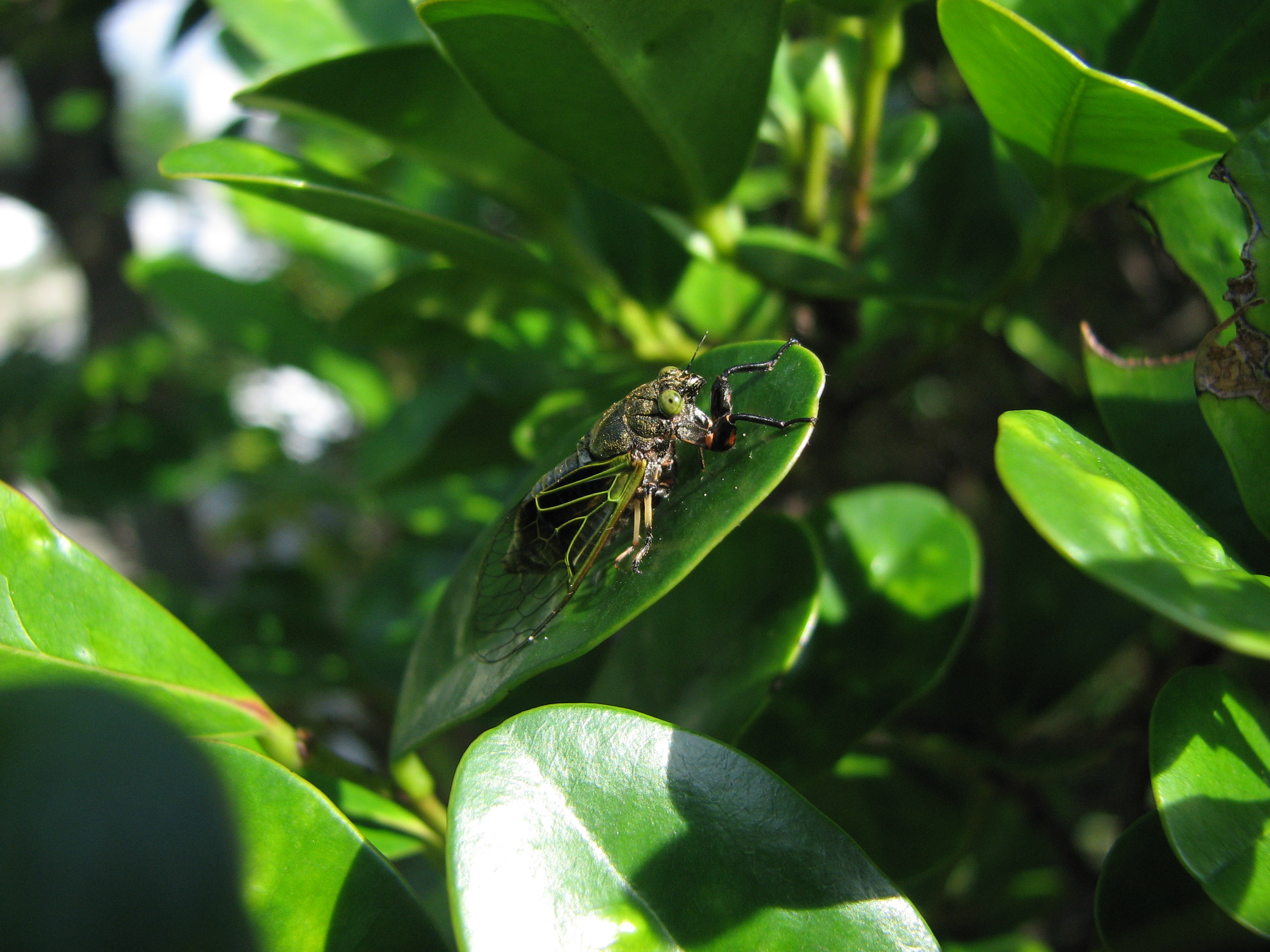
- Mogannia minuta

Scientific classification
- Kingdom: Animalia
- Phylum: Arthropoda
- Clade: Pancrustacea
- Class: Insecta
- Order: Hemiptera
- Suborder: Auchenorrhyncha
- Family: Cicadidae
- Subfamily: Cicadettinae
- Tribe: Cicadatrini; Distant, 1905

= Cicadatrini =

Tribe of true bugs

Cicadatrini is a tribe of cicadas in the family Cicadidae. There are at least 114 described species in Cicadatrini.

Members of Cicadatrini are found in the Palearctic and Indomalaya.

== Genera ==
The World Auchenorrhyncha Database (WAD) includes the following genera:

1. Bijaurana Distant, 1912
2. Chloropsalta Haupt, 1920^{c g}
3. Cicadatra Kolenati, 1857^{c g}
4. Emathia Stål, 1866^{c g}
5. Klapperichicen Dlabola, 1957^{c g}
6. Mogannia Amyot & Audinet-Serville, 1843^{c g}
7. Psalmocharias Kirkaldy, 1908^{c g}
8. Shaoshia Wei, Ahmed & Rizvi, 2010^{c g}
9. Taungia Ollenbach, 1929^{c g}
10. Triglena Fieber, 1875^{c g}
11. Vagitanus Distant, 1918^{c g}

Data sources: i = ITIS, c = Catalogue of Life, g = GBIF,

Note: The genus Pachypsaltria from South America, is now placed in tribe Zammarini.
