= Amphiporeia virginiana =

Scientific classification
- Domain: Eukaryota
- Kingdom: Animalia
- Phylum: Arthropoda
- Class: Malacostraca
- Order: Amphipoda
- Family: Bathyporeiidae
- Genus: Amphiporeia
- Species: A. virginiana

Binomial name
- Amphiporeia virginiana Shoemaker, 1933

Species of crustacean

Amphiporeia virginiana is a species of amphipod in the family Bathyporeiidae.
