= Onchotelson brevicaudatus =

Conservation status
- Vulnerable (IUCN 2.3)

Scientific classification
- Domain: Eukaryota
- Kingdom: Animalia
- Phylum: Arthropoda
- Class: Malacostraca
- Order: Isopoda
- Family: Phreatoicidae
- Genus: Onchotelson
- Species: O. brevicaudatus

Binomial name
- Onchotelson brevicaudatus (Smith, 1909)

Species of crustacean

Onchotelson brevicaudatus is a species of crustacean in the family Phreatoicidae. It is endemic to Australia.
