= Phreatoicopsidae =

Scientific classification
- Kingdom: Animalia
- Phylum: Arthropoda
- Clade: Pancrustacea
- Class: Malacostraca
- Order: Isopoda
- Suborder: Phreatoicidea
- Family: Phreatoicopsidae; Nicholls, 1943

Type genus
- Phreatoicopsis Spencer & Hall, 1896

Genera
- Phreatoicopsis Spencer & Hall, 1896; Synamphisopus Nicholls, 1943

Synonyms
- Phreatoicopsinae Nicholls, 1943

Family of crustaceans

Phreatoicopsidae is a family of freshwater isopods found in Oceania. It was originally described as a subfamily of Amphisopidae.

== Genera ==
The family contains the following two genera:

- Phreatoicopsis Spencer & Hall, 1896
- Synamphisopus Nicholls, 1943
