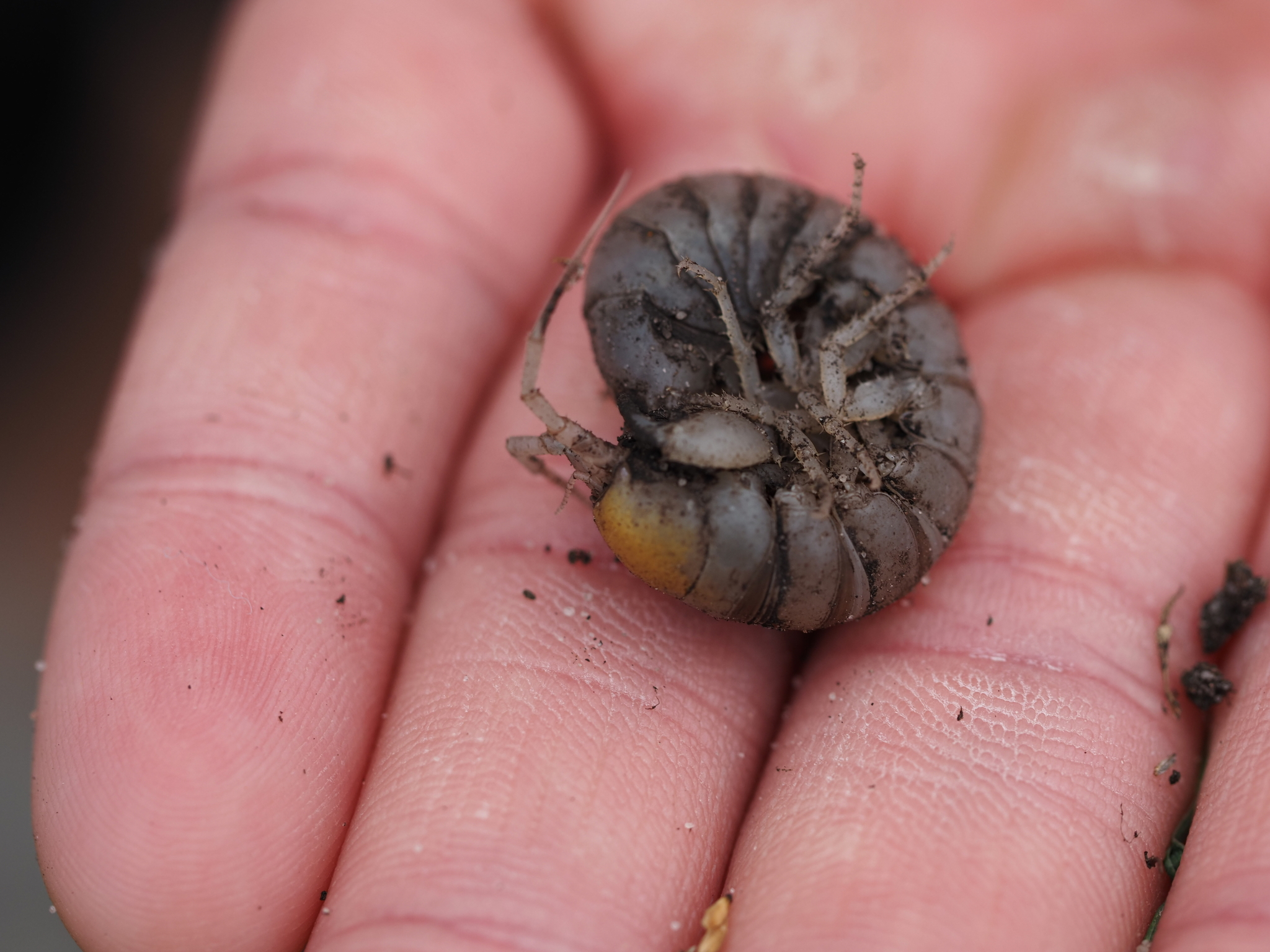
- Phreatoicopsis raffae photographed in Grampians National Park, Victoria

Scientific classification
- Kingdom: Animalia
- Phylum: Arthropoda
- Clade: Pancrustacea
- Class: Malacostraca
- Order: Isopoda
- Family: Phreatoicopsidae
- Genus: Phreatoicopsis; Spencer & Hall, 1896

Type species
- Phreatoicopsis terricola Spencer & Hall, 1896

Species
- P. raffae Wilson & Keable, 2002; P. terricola Spencer & Hall, 1896

= Phreatoicopsis =

Genus of isopods

Phreatoicopsis is a genus of semi-terrestrial isopods in the family Phreatoicopsidae. The genus includes two species, both endemic to Victoria, Australia.

== Taxonomy and history ==
The genus Phreatoicopsis, so named for its resemblance to Phreatoicus, was erected in 1896 by Baldwin Spencer and Thomas Sergeant Hall as a monospecific genus containing the sole species Phreatoicopsis terricola. A second species, Phreatoicopsis raffae, was described in 2002 from specimens collected in the Grampians National Park.

Phreatoicopsis is a sister group to Synamphisopus, and the two form a monophyletic clade.

== Distribution ==
Phreatoicopsis species are endemic to Victoria in south-eastern Australia. P. raffae is known from the Grampians National Park, while P. terricola is known from the Otway Ranges.

== Species ==
The genus Phreatoicopsis includes two species:

- Phreatoicopsis raffae Wilson & Keable, 2002
- Phreatoicopsis terricola Spencer & Hall, 1896
