= Phreatogammarus =

Scientific classification
- Kingdom: Animalia
- Phylum: Arthropoda
- Class: Malacostraca
- Order: Amphipoda
- Parvorder: Gammaridira
- Superfamily: Gammaroidea
- Family: Phreatogammaridae; Bousfield,1982
- Genus: Phreatogammarus; Stebbing, 1899

Species
- Phreatogammarus fragilis (Chilton, 1882); Phreatogammarus propinquus Chilton, 1907; Phreatogammarus helmsii Chilton, 1918; Phreatogammarus waipoua Chapman, 2003

Genus of crustaceans

Phreatogammarus is a genus of amphipod crustaceans that are endemic to New Zealand. It is the only genus in the family Phreatogammaridae, and contains four species, three of which were described by Charles Chilton.

== Phreatogammarus fragilis ==
P. fragilis was the first species to be described, when Charles Chilton named it Gammarus fragilis in 1882; it was moved to the genus Phreatogammarus by T. R. R. Stebbing in 1899, becoming the type species for the group. It lives in wells and groundwater, mainly in Canterbury and Nelson, and is not known to occur on the North Island.

== Phreatogammarus propinquus ==
Chilton's second species, P. propinquus was described in 1907 from a single specimen collected near the summit of Mount Anglem on Stewart Island / Rakiura. Chilton originally thought this specimen was a male, but later realised that it was in fact female. Other specimens have been collected near sea level, but have not been described in the literature.

== Phreatogammarus helmsii ==
When he realised that he had mis-sexed his Mount Anglem specimen of P. propinquus, Chilton also realised that the material he had described under that name from Rona Bay, Wellington, was a third species, which he named P. helmsii in 1918. It is a coastal freshwater species, only occurring further inland near Hamilton on the Waikato River system. It is widespread, occurring in many parts of both the North and South Islands.

== Phreatogammarus waipoua ==
Few scientists have worked on the genus Phreatogammarus after Charles Chilton, and it was not until 2003 that a fourth species was described. M. A. Chapman, in a revision of the genus, established a new species, P. waipoua for populations of Phreatogammarus living in two forests in Northland Region.

== Undescribed species ==
There are at least two further undescribed species which live in Canterbury, and many collections from Nelson have not yet been examined.
