= Ramellogammarus similimanus =

Scientific classification
- Domain: Eukaryota
- Kingdom: Animalia
- Phylum: Arthropoda
- Class: Malacostraca
- Order: Amphipoda
- Family: Anisogammaridae
- Genus: Ramellogammarus
- Species: R. similimanus

Binomial name
- Ramellogammarus similimanus Bousfield, 1961

Species of crustacean

Ramellogammarus similimanus is a crustacean species in the family Anisogammaridae. Because this amphipod only resides in the Portland metropolitan area, in Oregon, United States, it has been given the common name Stumptown scud.

== Description ==
R. similimanus is about the size of a pinky nail. It has a curled outer shell of a golden color and long antennae. Its appearance has been described as a "cross between a prawn and a potato bug." Similar to marsupials, females have a pouch in which they carry their eggs.

== Habitat and range ==
The species is believed to only exist within the boundaries of the Portland metropolitan area. It lives in small freshwater creeks and tributaries. "Stumptown" is a nickname applied to Portland and several other locations in the United States.

== Behavior and ecology ==
R. similimanus is difficult to observe as it prefers to remain hidden under the organic material on which it feeds. It can only move via connected waterways, limiting its geographic scope. Scavenged dead and decaying material makes up its diet. It is consumed by amphibians and fish.

Mating involves a complex ritual. Males search for maturing females who are nearly ready to molt out of their shells. The males then ride the backs of the females to secure them and prevent other males from stealing their chosen mate.

== Research ==
The species was first described by Edward L. Bousfield in 1961. The Oregon Zoo funded research conducted by Oregon State University through the "Oregon Zoo Foundation's Future for Wildlife program". The researchers have used the environmental DNA methodology in order to minimize impact on a small and vulnerable population.
