= Onchotelson =

Scientific classification
- Kingdom: Animalia
- Phylum: Arthropoda
- Clade: Pancrustacea
- Class: Malacostraca
- Order: Isopoda
- Suborder: Phreatoicidea
- Family: Phreatoicidae
- Genus: Onchotelson; Nicholls, 1944

Type species
- Onchotelson brevicaudatus (Smith, 1909)

Genus of crustaceans

Onchotelson is a genus of isopod crustaceans in the family Phreatoicidae, which is endemic to Tasmania. It contains two species, both of which are listed as vulnerable on the IUCN Red List:

- Onchotelson brevicaudatus (Smith, 1909)
- Onchotelson spatulatus Nicholls, 1944
