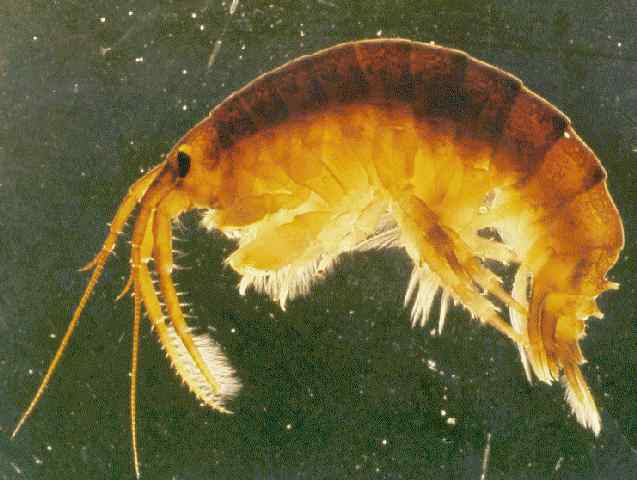
- Dikerogammarus villosus

Scientific classification
- Kingdom: Animalia
- Phylum: Arthropoda
- Class: Malacostraca
- Order: Amphipoda
- Suborder: Senticaudata
- Infraorder: Gammarida
- Parvorder: Gammaridira
- Superfamily: Gammaroidea; Latreille, 1802 (Bousfield, 1977)

= Gammaroidea =

Superfamily of crustaceans

Gammaroidea is a superfamily of crustaceans in the order Amphipoda.

== Families ==
These families belong to the superfamily Gammaroidea:

- Acanthogammaridae Garjajeff, 1901
- Anisogammaridae Bousfield, 1977
- Baikalogammaridae Kamaltynov, 2002
- Bathyporeiidae d'Udekem d'Acoz, 2011
- Behningiellidae Kamaltynov, 2002
- Carinogammaridae Tachteew, 2001 sensu Kamaltynov, 2010
- Crypturopodidae Kamaltynov, 2002
- Eulimnogammaridae Kamaltynov, 1999
- Falklandellidae Lowry & Myers, 2012
- Gammaracanthidae Bousfield, 1989
- Gammarellidae Bousfield, 1977
- Gammaridae Latreille, 1802
- Iphigenellidae Kamaltynov, 2002
- Luciobliviidae Tomikawa, 2007
- Macrohectopidae Sowinsky, 1915
- Mesogammaridae Bousfield, 1977
- Micruropodidae Kamaltynov, 1999
- Ommatogammaridae Kamaltynov, 2010
- Pachyschesidae Kamaltynov, 1999
- Pallaseidae Tachteew, 2001
- Paraleptamphopidae Bousfield, 1983
- Phreatogammaridae Bousfield, 1982
- Pontogammaridae Bousfield, 1977
- Sensonatoridae Lowry & Myers, 2012
- Typhlogammaridae Bousfield, 1978
- Zaramillidae Lowry & Myers, 2016
