= Mesamphisopus =

Scientific classification
- Kingdom: Animalia
- Phylum: Arthropoda
- Clade: Pancrustacea
- Class: Malacostraca
- Order: Isopoda
- Suborder: Phreatoicidea
- Family: Mesamphisopidae; Nicholls, 1943
- Genus: Mesamphisopus; Nicholls, 1943

Type species
- Phreatoicus capensis Barnard, 1914

Genus of isopods

Mesamphisopus is a genus of freshwater phreatoicidean isopod crustaceans endemic to South Africa. It is the only genus in the family Mesamphisopidae.

== Distribution ==
Mesamphisopus is the only member of Phreatoicidea that occurs outside of Australia, New Zealand and India. Species are fairly restricted in range, with the majority occurring on the Cape Peninsula and the Hottentots Holland Mountains as well as the Agulhas Plain, Jonkershoek Nature Reserve, Tsitsikamma Forest and the Langeberg Range.

== Species ==
The genus Mesamphisopus includes 10 species:

- Mesamphisopus abbreviatus (Barnard 1927)
- Mesamphisopus albidus Gouws, 2008
- Mesamphisopus baccatus Gouws, 2008
- Mesamphisopus capensis (Barnard 1914)
- Mesamphisopus depressus (Barnard 1927)
- Mesamphisopus kensleyi Gouws, 2008
- Mesamphisopus paludosus Gouws, 2008
- Mesamphisopus penicillatus (Barnard 1940)
- Mesamphisopus setosus Gouws, 2008
- Mesamphisopus tsitsikamma Gouws, 2008
