= Typhlogammaridae =

Scientific classification
- Kingdom: Animalia
- Phylum: Arthropoda
- Clade: Pancrustacea
- Class: Malacostraca
- Order: Amphipoda
- Superfamily: Gammaroidea
- Family: Typhlogammaridae

Family of crustaceans

Typhlogammaridae is a family of amphipods belonging to the order Amphipoda.

Genera:

- Accubogammarus Karaman, 1974
- Adaugammarus Sidorov, Gontcharov & Sharina, 2015
- Metohia Absolon, 1927
- Typhlogammarus Schäferna, 1907
- Zenkevitchia Birstein, 1940
