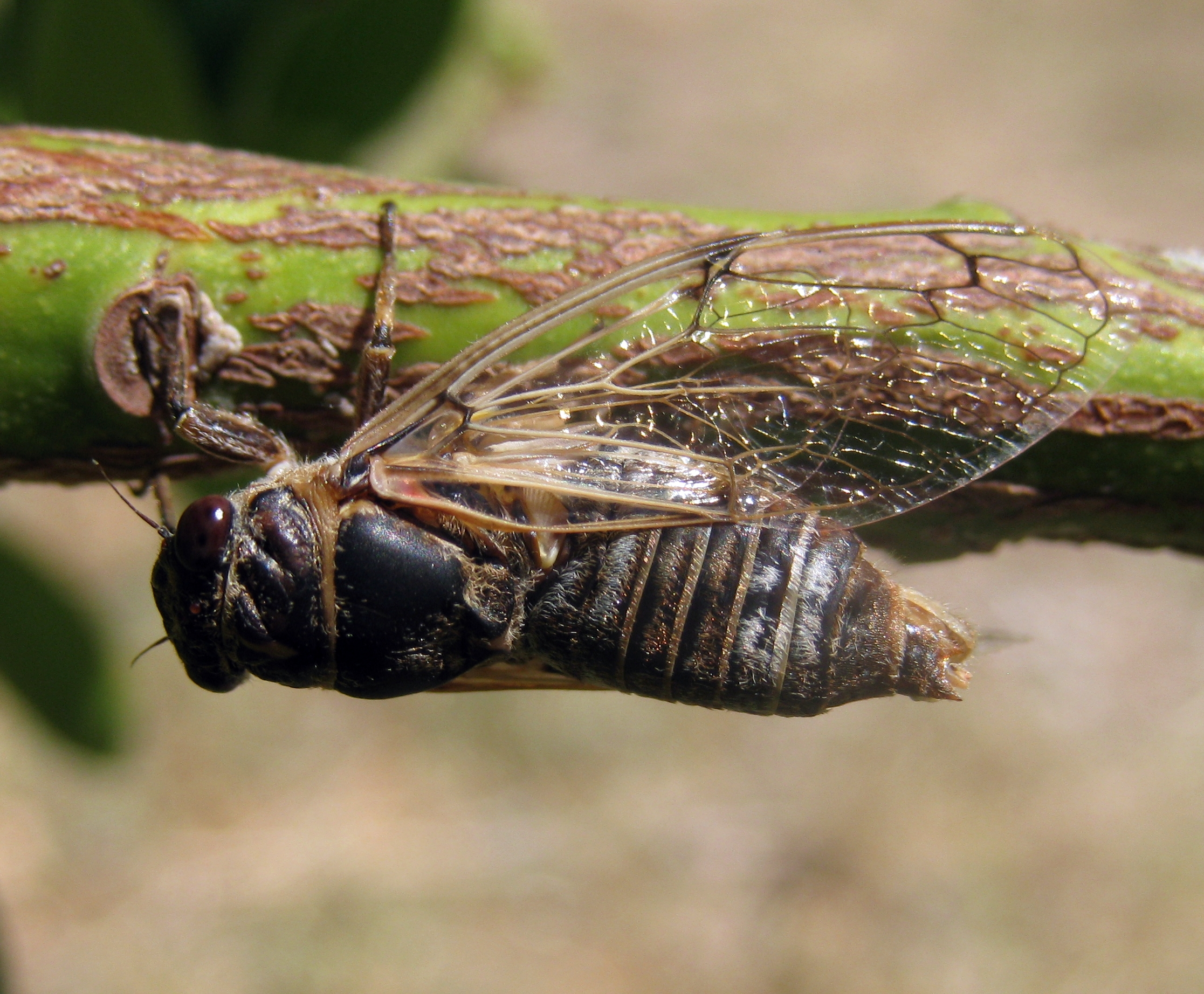

Scientific classification
- Kingdom: Animalia
- Phylum: Arthropoda
- Class: Insecta
- Order: Hemiptera
- Suborder: Auchenorrhyncha
- Family: Cicadidae
- Genus: Cicadatra
- Species: C. atra

Binomial name
- Cicadatra atra (Linnaeus, 1758)

Subspecies
- Cicadatra atra atra; Cicadatra atra aquilla

Synonyms
- Cicada atra Linnaeus, 1758

= Cicadatra atra =

Species of true bug

Cicadatra atra, the black cicada, is a species of cicada belonging to the family Cicadidae and the genus Cicadatra.

== Distribution ==
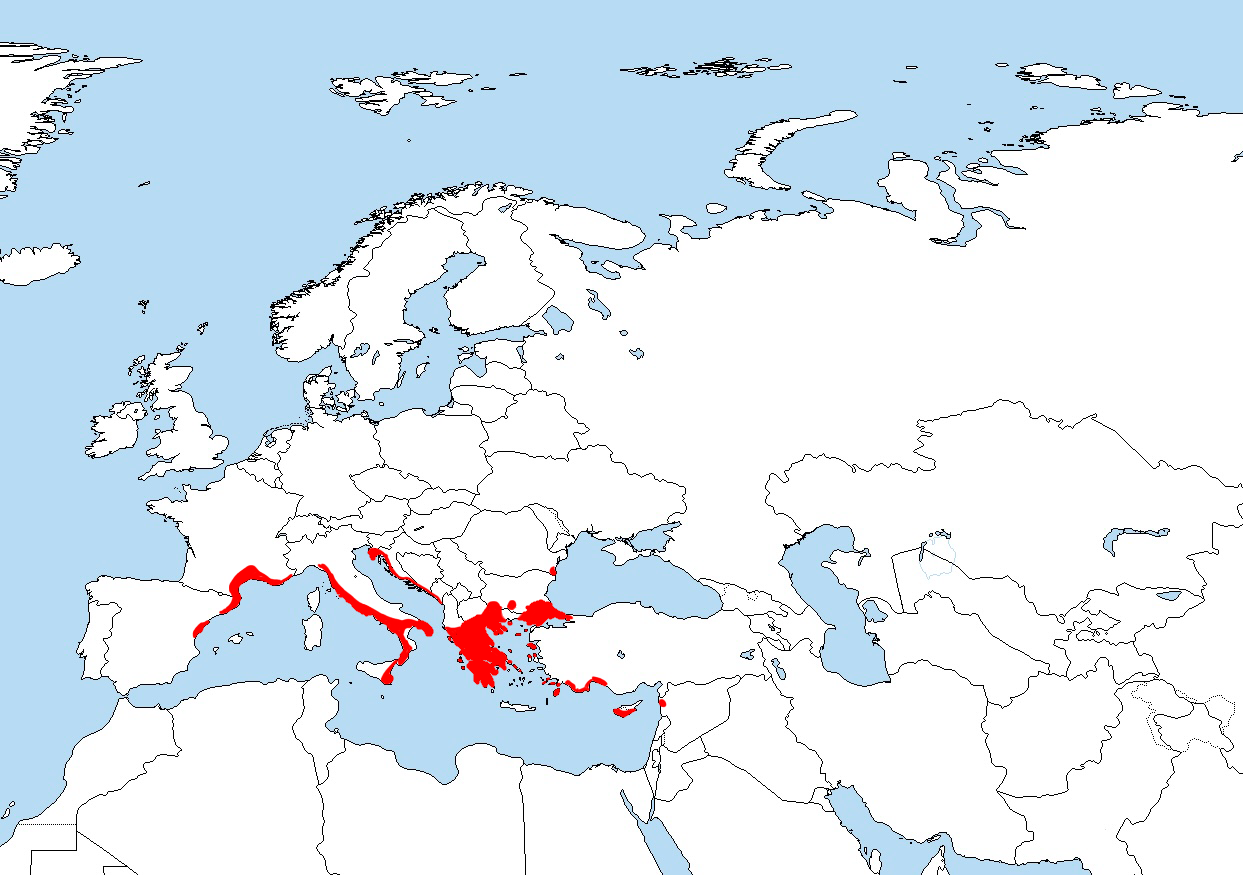
Habitat map

This species is widespread across coastal regions of southern France, Catalonia (Spain), Croatia, Bosnia and Herzegovina, Montenegro and Syria, as well as in southern Albania and Bulgaria, mainland Greece, the North Aegean islands, southern coast of Cyprus, southwestern Turkey and its European part.

== Habitat ==
Cicada atra prefers dry, rocky, or shrubby environments, including grasslands and open woodlands, mountainous slopes with sparse vegetation, as well as in coastal shrublands.

== Behavior ==
Males produce loud, rhythmic calls to attract females during summer.
