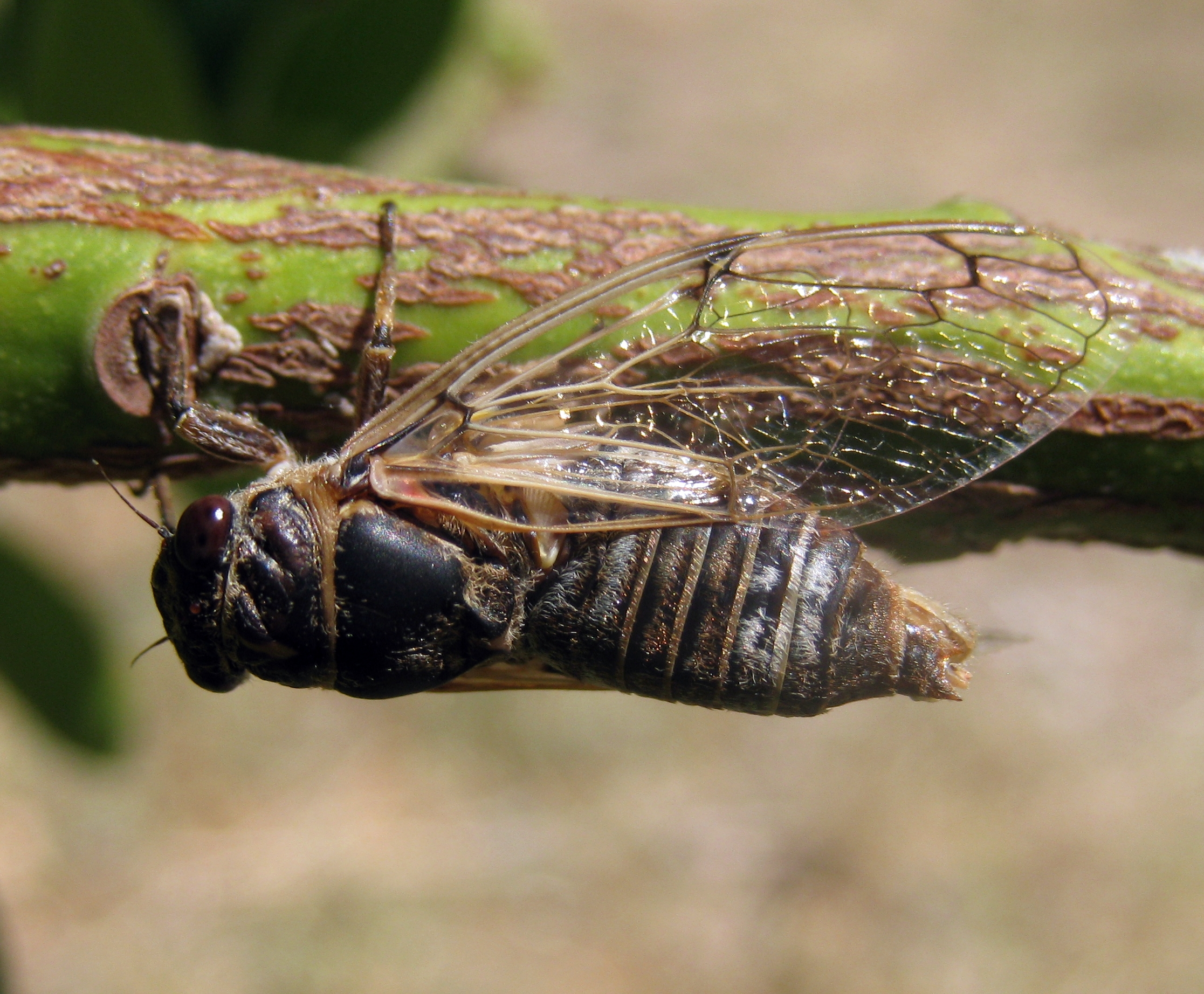
- Cicadatra atra

Scientific classification
- Domain: Eukaryota
- Kingdom: Animalia
- Phylum: Arthropoda
- Class: Insecta
- Order: Hemiptera
- Suborder: Auchenorrhyncha
- Family: Cicadidae
- Subfamily: Cicadinae
- Tribe: Cicadatrini
- Genus: Cicadatra; Kolenati, 1857

Synonyms
- Cicadrata Kolenati, 1857; Rustavelia Horvath, 1912

= Cicadatra =

Genus of cicadas

Cicadatra is a genus of European and Asian cicadas; it was erected by Kolenati in 1857 and is typical of the tribe Cicadatrini.

== Species ==
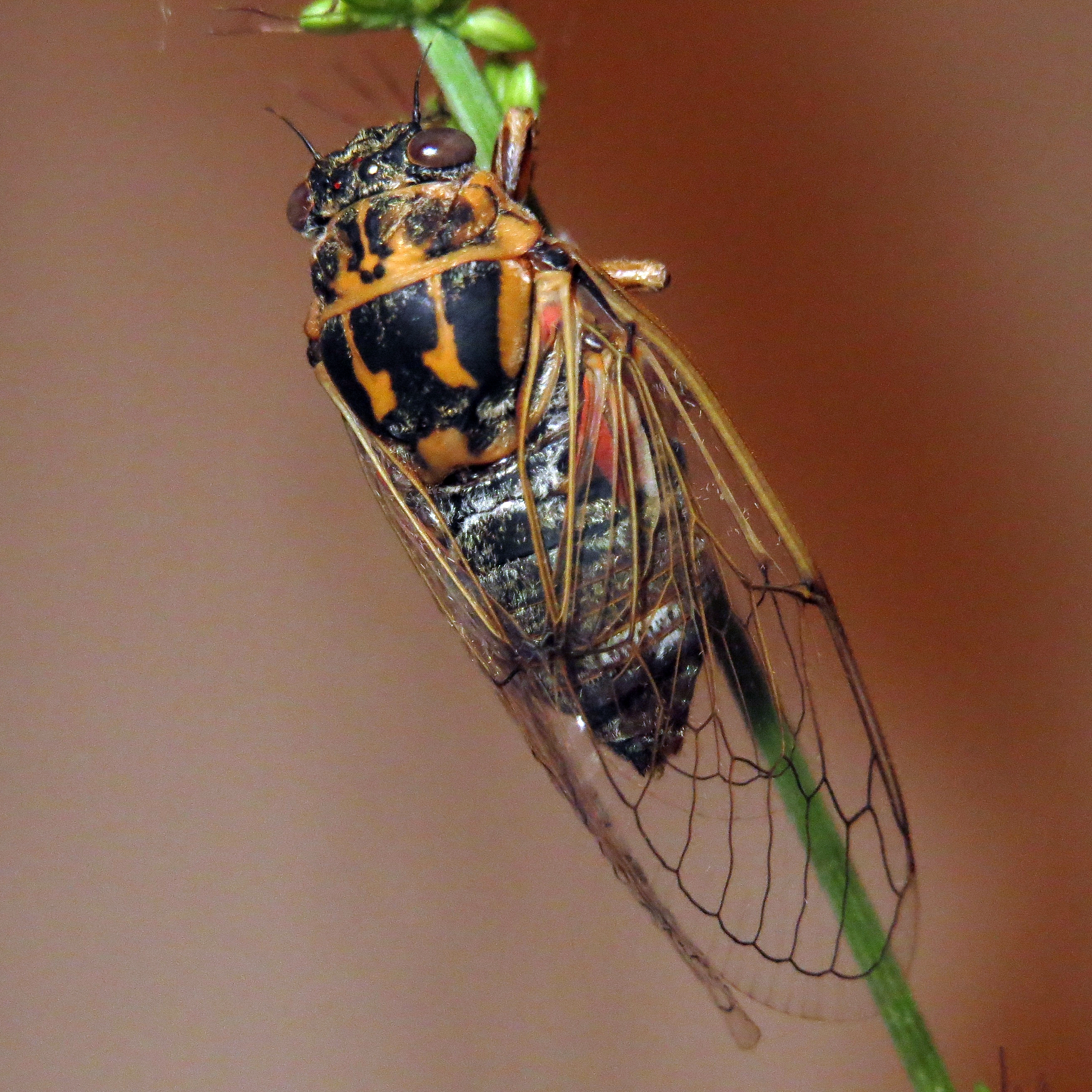
Cicadatra hyalina

The following are included by the Global Biodiversity Information Facility:

1. Cicadatra abdominalis Schumacher, 1923
2. Cicadatra acberi (Distant, 1888)
3. Cicadatra adanai Kartal, 1980
4. Cicadatra alhageos (Kolenati, 1857)
5. Cicadatra anoea (Walker, 1850)
6. Cicadatra appendiculata Linnavuori, 1954
7. Cicadatra ashrafi Ahmed, Sanborn & Akhter, 2013
8. Cicadatra atra (Olivier, 1790) - type species
9. Cicadatra barbodi Mozaffarian & Sanborn, 2013
10. Cicadatra bistunensis Mozaffarian & Sanborn, 2010
11. Cicadatra erkowitensis Linnavuori, 1973
12. Cicadatra flavicollis Horváth, 1911
13. Cicadatra genoina Dlabola, 1979
14. Cicadatra gingat China, 1926
15. Cicadatra gregoryi China, 1925
16. Cicadatra hagenica Dlabola, 1987
17. Cicadatra hei Wang, He & Wei, 2017
18. Cicadatra hyalina (Fabricius, 1798)
19. Cicadatra hyalinata (Brullé, 1832)
20. Cicadatra icari Simões, Sanborn & Quartau, 2013
21. Cicadatra inconspicua Distant, 1912
22. Cicadatra karachiensis Ahmed, Sanborn & Hill, 2010
23. Cicadatra karpathosensis Simões, Sanborn & Quartau, 2013
24. Cicadatra kermanica Dlabola, 1970
25. Cicadatra longipennis Schumacher, 1923
26. Cicadatra lorestanica Mozaffarian & Sanborn, 2010
27. Cicadatra mirzayansi Dlabola, 1981
28. Cicadatra naja Dlabola, 1979
29. Cicadatra pallasi Schumacher, 1923
30. Cicadatra pazukii Mozaffarian & Sanborn, 2015
31. Cicadatra persica Kirkaldy, 1909
32. Cicadatra platyptera Fieber, 1876
33. Cicadatra raja Distant, 1906
34. Cicadatra ramanensis Linnavuori, 1962
35. Cicadatra reinhardi Kartal, 1980
36. Cicadatra sankara (Distant, 1904)
37. Cicadatra serresi (Meunier, 1915)
38. Cicadatra shaluensis China, 1925
39. Cicadatra shapur Dlabola, 1981
40. Cicadatra tandojamensis Ahmed, Sanborn & Akhter, 2013
41. Cicadatra tenebrosa Fieber, 1876
42. Cicadatra vulcania Dlabola & Heller, 1962
43. Cicadatra walkeri Metcalf, 1963
44. Cicadatra xantes (Walker, 1850)
45. Cicadatra zahedanica Dlabola, 1970
46. Cicadatra ziaratica Ahmed, Sanborn & Akhter, 2012
