= Amathia =

Amathia may refer to:

- Amathia is a variant spelling of Amatheia (mythology)
- Amathia (bryozoan), a genus of bryozoans in the family Vesiculariidae
- Amathia, a genus of crustaceans in the family Epialtidae, synonym of Anamathia
- Amathia, a genus of arthropods in the family Phytoseiidae, synonym of Neoseiulus
- Amathia, a genus of amphipods in the family Gammarellidae, synonym of Gammarellus
