= Paraleptamphopus =

Scientific classification
- Kingdom: Animalia
- Phylum: Arthropoda
- Clade: Pancrustacea
- Class: Malacostraca
- Order: Amphipoda
- Family: Paraleptamphopidae
- Genus: Paraleptamphopus; Stebbing, 1899

Species
- Paraleptamphopus caeruleus (Thomson, 1885); Paraleptamphopus subterraneus (Chilton, 1882)

Genus of crustaceans

Paraleptamphopus is a genus of amphipods in the family Paraleptamphopidae endemic to New Zealand. The first species to be described was Calliope subterraneus (now Paraleptamphopus subterraneus) which was named by Charles Chilton in 1882. George M. Thomson described a second species in 1885, as Pherusa coerulea (now Paraleptamphopus caeruleus). Although no other species have yet been formally described, it is thought that many more undescribed species exist.

== Paraleptamphopus subterraneus ==
In 1882, Charles Chilton collected specimens of P. subterraneus from groundwater at his farm near Eyreton, Canterbury, and later obtained specimens from various depths in Lincoln, Winchester and St. Albans. These animals were colourless and lacked eyes, and were described as a new species in the genus Calliope. Chilton later acquired specimens from the Porter River at Castle Hill, Canterbury, from Lake Wakatipu, Otago, from Lake Taupō on the North Island and from Otautau, Southland.

== Paraleptamphopus caeruleus ==
George M. Thomson described a new species in the genus Pherusa in 1885, from specimens collected in a mountain stream in the Old Man Range of central Otago at an altitude of 3,000 ft (910 m). Further populations were not found for several years, but were later discovered at a variety of locations, including "the bog-water on top of Swampy Hill, near Dunedin", Otautau (together with P. subterraneus), Ruapuke Island, Drummond, and near Invercargill. Unlike P. subterraneus, P. caeruleus is a deep blue colour, which it retains even after prolonged preservation. Chilton concluded that P. caeruleus was the form from which P. subterraneus evolved.

== Undescribed species ==
More recent work has unearthed a great deal of genetic variability within the specimens ascribed to the genus, which is likely to result in the description of a number of new species. The centre of diversity is in the upper West Coast of the South Island, and the genus appears to be absent from the eastern portion of the North Island, (the Bay of Plenty, East Cape, and northern Hawke's Bay), presumably due to a recent history of volcanism.
