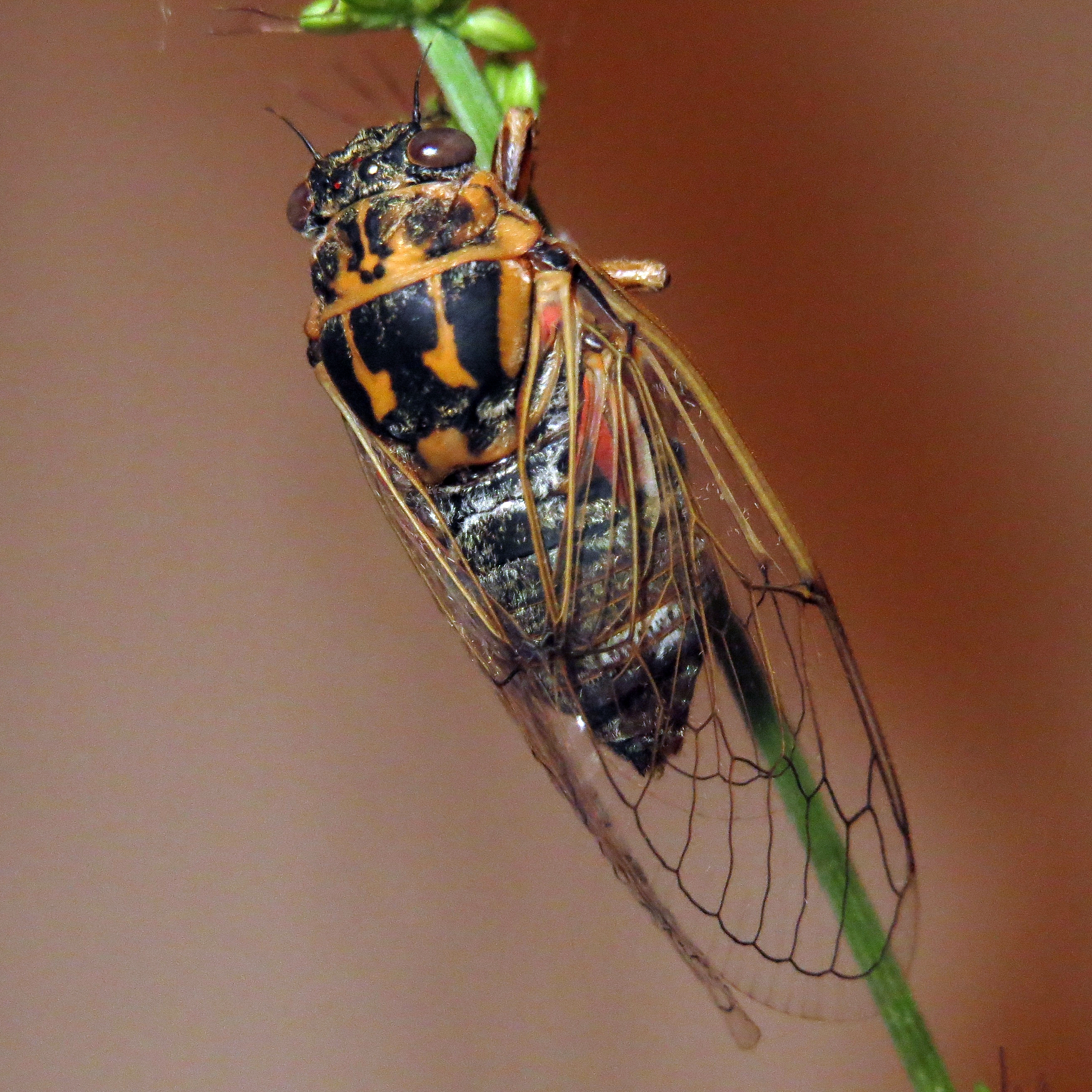

Scientific classification
- Kingdom: Animalia
- Phylum: Arthropoda
- Clade: Pancrustacea
- Class: Insecta
- Order: Hemiptera
- Suborder: Auchenorrhyncha
- Family: Cicadidae
- Genus: Cicadatra
- Species: C. hyalina

Binomial name
- Cicadatra hyalina Fabricius, 1798
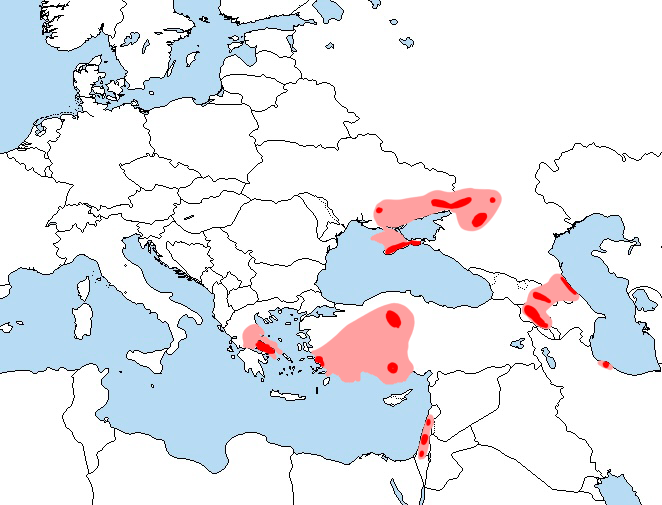
- Red:Habitat area Pink:possible habitat area

= Cicadatra hyalina =

Species of insect

Cicadatra hyalina is a species of cicada belonging to the family Cicadidae, subfamily Cicadinae, and the genus Cicadatra.

The species name hyalina is derived from the Latin word "hyalinus" meaning "glassy" or "transparent".
