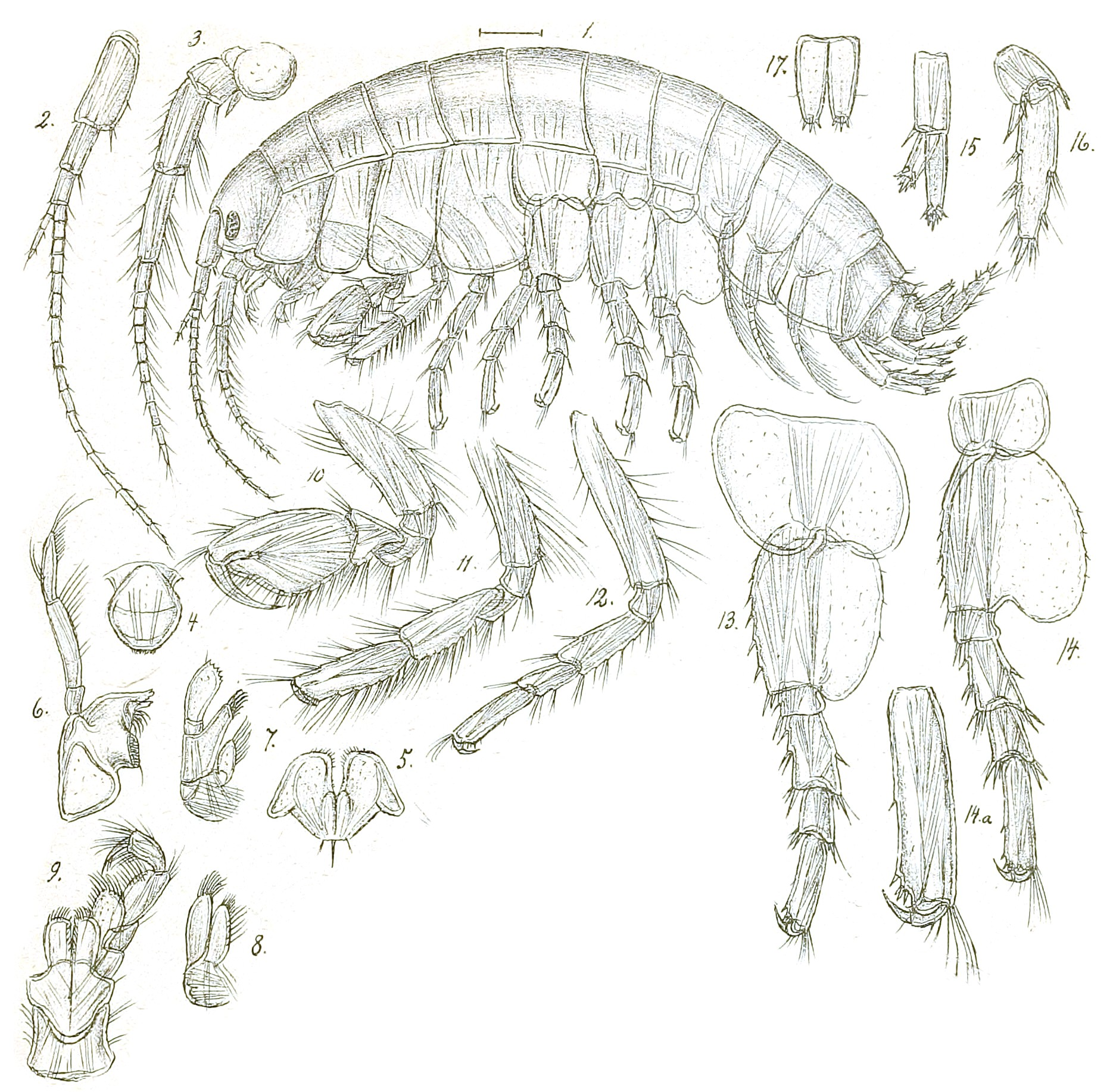
- Iphigenella acanthopoda

Scientific classification
- Kingdom: Animalia
- Phylum: Arthropoda
- Class: Malacostraca
- Order: Amphipoda
- Superfamily: Gammaroidea
- Family: Iphigenellidae; Kamaltynov, 2001

Type genus
- Iphigenella Sars, 1896

= Iphigenellidae =

Family of crustaceans

Iphigenellidae is a freshwater family of amphipods in the superfamily Gammaroidea. It is found in the Ponto-Caspian region, which encompasses the Black, Azov, and Caspian Seas.

== Taxonomy ==
The family has only one recognised species.

- Iphigenella Sars, 1896
  - Iphigenella acanthopoda Sars, 1896

Two species – I. andrussowi and I. shablensis – were, respectively, described by Sars and Carausu in 1894 and 1943, but these species are no longer recognized.
