= Rudolphia =

Scientific classification
- Kingdom: Animalia
- Phylum: Arthropoda
- Clade: Pancrustacea
- Class: Malacostraca
- Order: Amphipoda
- Family: Paraleptamphopidae
- Genus: Rudolphia; Grosso & Peralta 2009
- Species: R. macrodactylus

Binomial name
- Rudolphia macrodactylus Grosso & Peralta, 2009

Genus of crustaceans

Rudolphia is a monotypic genus of amphipods in the family Paraleptamphopidae found in Chile. The only species is Rudolphia macrodactylus.
