= Paraleptamphopidae =

Scientific classification
- Kingdom: Animalia
- Phylum: Arthropoda
- Clade: Pancrustacea
- Class: Malacostraca
- Order: Amphipoda
- Suborder: Senticaudata
- Infraorder: Gammarida
- Parvorder: Gammaridira
- Superfamily: Gammaroidea
- Family: Paraleptamphopidae; Bousfield, 1977

Genera
- Paraleptamphopus Stebbing, 1899; Ringanui Fenwick, 2006; Rudolphia Grosso & Peralta, 2009

Family of crustaceans

Paraleptamphopidae is a family of amphipod crustaceans, containing three genera. Paraleptamphopus and Ringanui are both endemic to New Zealand, but Rudolphia lives in Chile.
