= Uramphisopus =

Conservation status
- Vulnerable (IUCN 2.3)

Scientific classification
- Kingdom: Animalia
- Phylum: Arthropoda
- Class: Malacostraca
- Order: Isopoda
- Family: Phreatoicidae
- Genus: Uramphisopus; Nicholls, 1943
- Species: U. pearsoni

Binomial name
- Uramphisopus pearsoni Nicholls, 1943

Genus of crustaceans

Uramphisopus is a monotypic genus of isopod crustaceans in the family Phreatoicidae. The only species is Uramphisopus pearsoni. It is only found in Brandum Bay basin in the north of Great Lake, Tasmania.
