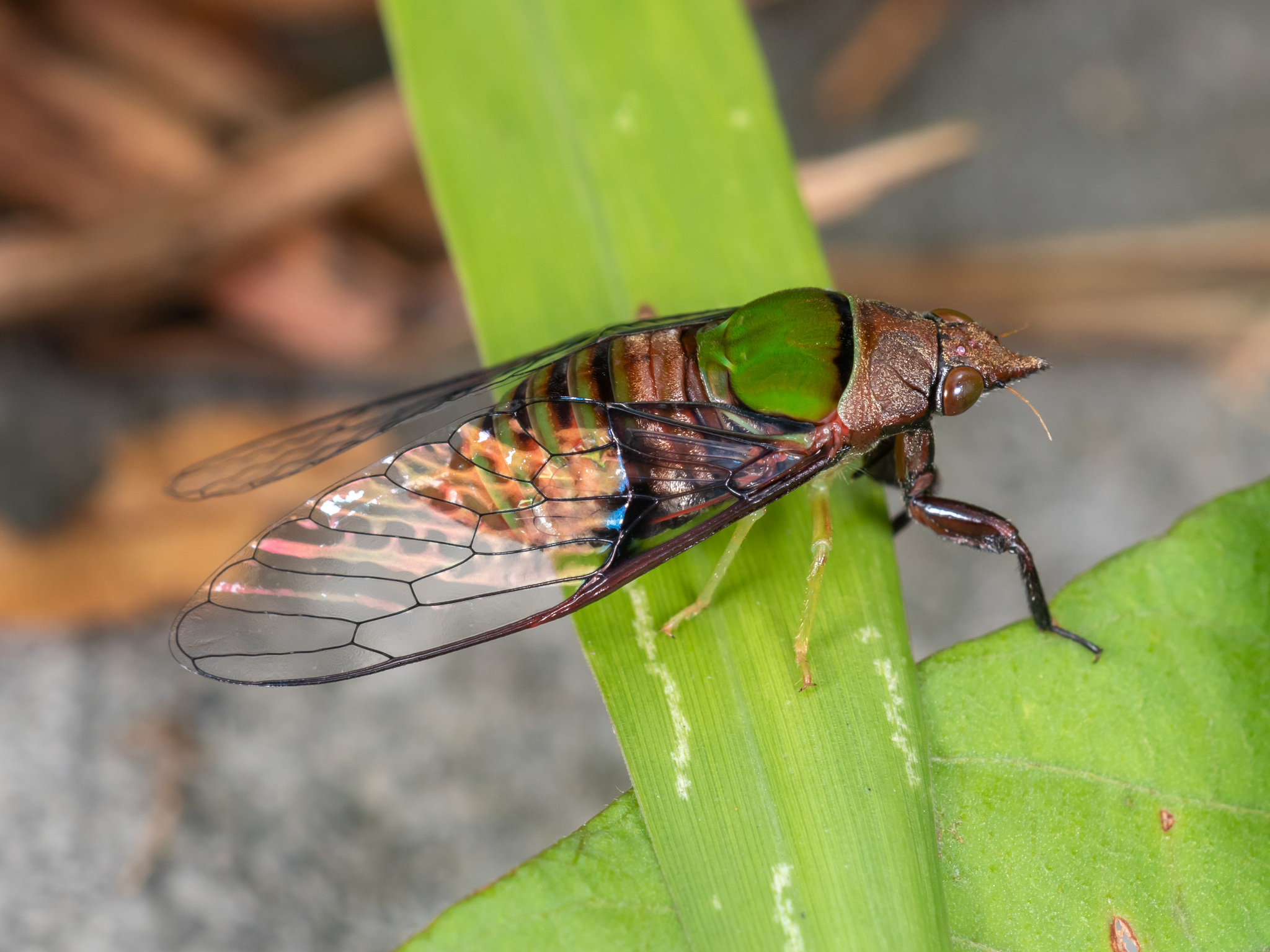
- Mogannia sesioides

Scientific classification
- Kingdom: Animalia
- Phylum: Arthropoda
- Clade: Pancrustacea
- Class: Insecta
- Order: Hemiptera
- Suborder: Auchenorrhyncha
- Family: Cicadidae
- Subfamily: Cicadettinae
- Tribe: Cicadatrini
- Genus: Mogannia; Amyot & Audinet-Serville, 1843

Synonyms
- Cephaloaeys Signoret, 1847; Cephaloxys Signoret, 1847; Mogonnia Amyot & Audinet-Serville, 1843; Mongania Amyot & Audinet-Serville, 1843 and other orthographic variants

= Mogannia =

Genus of true bugs

Mogannia (from Arabic: مغنية, romanized: mughaniya, lit. 'songstress') is a genus of Asian cicadas in the tribe Cicadatrini (also called Moganniini), erected by Charles Jean-Baptiste Amyot and Jean Guillaume Audinet-Serville in 1843. Species have been recorded from China, Japan, Indochina and Malesia.

== Species ==
The Global Biodiversity Information Facility includes:

1. Mogannia aliena Distant, 1920
2. Mogannia aurea Fraser, 1942
3. Mogannia basalis Matsumura, 1913
4. Mogannia binotata Distant, 1906
5. Mogannia caesar Jacobi, 1902
6. Mogannia conica (Germar, 1830)
  - type species (as Mogannia illustrata Amyot & Serville, 1843)
7. Mogannia cyanea Walker, 1858
8. Mogannia doriae Distant, 1888
9. Mogannia effecta Distant, 1892
10. Mogannia flammifera Moulton, 1923
11. Mogannia formosana Matsumura, 1907
12. Mogannia funebris Stål, 1865
13. Mogannia funettae Boulard, 2008
14. Mogannia grelaka Moulton, 1923
15. Mogannia guangdongensis Chen, Yang & Wei, 2012
16. Mogannia hainana Shen, Lei & Yang, 2006
17. Mogannia hebes (Walker, 1858)
18. Mogannia horsfieldi Distant, 1905
19. Mogannia indigotea Distant, 1917
20. Mogannia malayana Moulton, 1923
21. Mogannia mandarina Distant, 1905
22. Mogannia minuta Matsumura, 1907
23. Mogannia montana Moulton, 1923
24. Mogannia moultoni Distant, 1910
25. Mogannia nasalis (White, 1844)
26. Mogannia obliqua Walker, 1858
27. Mogannia paae Boulard, 2009
28. Mogannia rosea Moulton, 1923
29. Mogannia ruiliensis Chen, Yang & Wei, 2012
30. Mogannia saucia Noualhier, 1896
31. Mogannia sesioides Walker, 1868
32. Mogannia sumatrana Moulton, 1923
33. Mogannia tenebrosa Lee & Marshall, 2023
34. Mogannia tumdactylina Chen, Yang & Wei, 2012
35. Mogannia unicolor (Walker, 1852)
36. Mogannia venustissima Stål, 1865
37. Mogannia viridis (Signoret, 1847)
