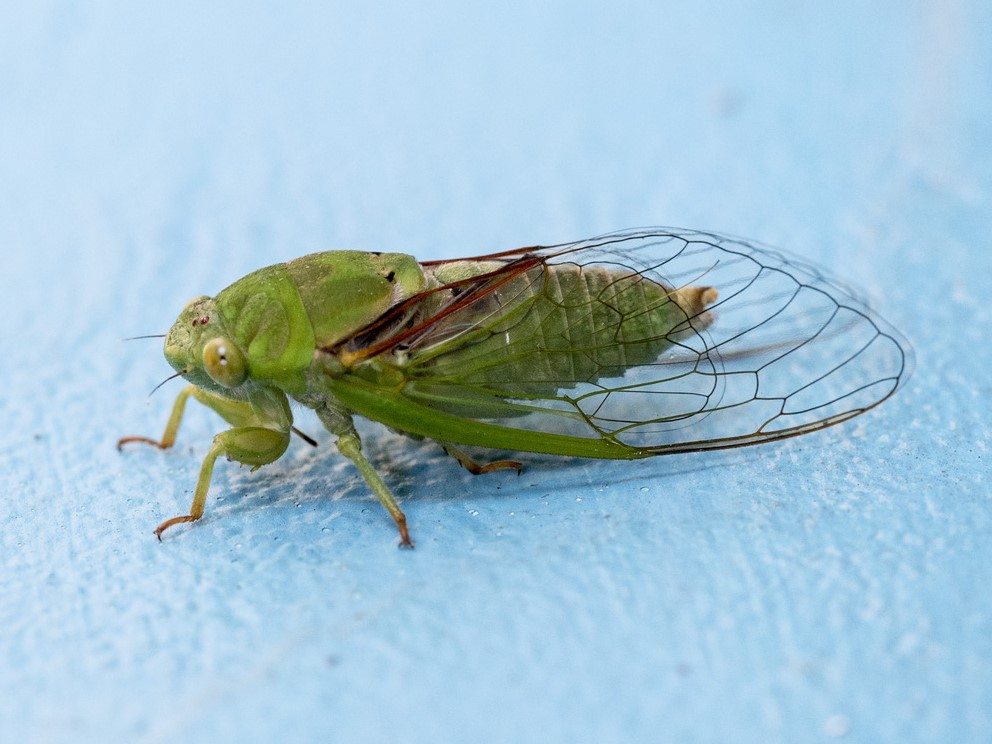
- Vagitanus virescens

Scientific classification
- Kingdom: Animalia
- Phylum: Arthropoda
- Clade: Pancrustacea
- Class: Insecta
- Order: Hemiptera
- Suborder: Auchenorrhyncha
- Family: Cicadidae
- Tribe: Cicadatrini
- Genus: Vagitanus; Distant, 1918

Synonyms
- Nipponosemia Kato, 1925

= Vagitanus (cicada) =

Genus of true bugs

Vagitanus is a genus of cicadas in the family Cicadidae. There are about eight described species in Vagitanus, found in China, Taiwan and Indochina.

== Species ==
These seven species belong to the genus Vagitanus:

- Vagitanus guangxiensis (Chou & Wang, 1993)^{c g}
- Vagitanus longidactyla (Yang & Wei, 2013)^{c g}
- Vagitanus luangensis (Distant, 1918)^{c g}
- Vagitanus metulata (Chou & Lei, 1993)^{c g}
- Vagitanus terminalis (Matsumura, 1913)^{c g}
- Vagitanus venetus (Emery, Lee, 2024) ^{j}
- Vagitanus vientianensis (Distant, 1918)^{c g}
- Vagitanus virescens (Kato, 1926)^{c g}

Data sources: i = ITIS, c = Catalogue of Life, g = GBIF, b = Bugguide.net, j = Journal of Asia-Pacific Biodiversity
