= Eulimnogammaridae =

- Eulimnogammarus verrucosus.

Scientific classification
- Kingdom: Animalia
- Phylum: Arthropoda
- Clade: Pancrustacea
- Class: Malacostraca
- Order: Amphipoda
- Superfamily: Gammaroidea
- Family: Eulimnogammaridae

Family of crustaceans

Eulimnogammaridae is a family of amphipods belonging to the order Amphipoda.

== Genera ==
Genera:

- Abyssogammarus Sowinsky, 1915
- Barguzinia Kamaltynov, 2002
- Bazikalovia Tachteew, 2001
- Berchinia Kamaltynov, 2002
- Eulimnogammarus Bazikalova, 1945
- Fluviogammarus Dorogostaisky, 1917
- Heterogammarus Stebbing, 1899
- Laxmannia Kamaltynov, 2002
- Leptostenus Bazikalova, 1945
- Lobogammarus Bazikalova, 1945
- Macropereiopus Sowinsky, 1915
- Odontogammarus Stebbing, 1899
- Polyacanthisca Bazikalova, 1937
- Profundalia Kamaltynov, 2002
- Sluginella Kamaltynov, 2002
- Tengisia Kamaltynov, 2002
