= Pachyschesis =

Scientific classification
- Domain: Eukaryota
- Kingdom: Animalia
- Phylum: Arthropoda
- Class: Malacostraca
- Order: Amphipoda
- Superfamily: Gammaroidea
- Family: Pachyschesidae
- Genus: Pachyschesis; Bazikalova, 1945

Genus of crustaceans

Pachyschesis is a genus of crustaceans belonging to the monotypic family Pachyschesidae.

Species:

- Pachyschesis acanthogammarii Tachteew, 2001
- Pachyschesis bazikalovae Karaman, 1976
- Pachyschesis bergi Bazikalova, 1945
- Pachyschesis branchialis (Dybowsky, 1874)
- Pachyschesis bumammus Tachteew, 2001
- Pachyschesis crassus (Sowinsky, 1915)
- Pachyschesis cucuschonok Tachteew, 2001
- Pachyschesis indiscretus Tachteew, 2001
- Pachyschesis inquilinus Tachteew, 2001
- Pachyschesis karabanowi Tachteew, 2001
- Pachyschesis lamakini Tachteew, 2001
- Pachyschesis pinguiculus Tachteew, 2001
- Pachyschesis punctiommatus Tachteew, 2001
- Pachyschesis rarus Tachteew, 2001
- Pachyschesis sideljowae Tachteew, 2001
- Pachyschesis vorax Tachteew, 2001
