= Cicadatra icari =

Scientific classification
- Kingdom: Animalia
- Phylum: Arthropoda
- Class: Insecta
- Order: Hemiptera
- Suborder: Auchenorrhyncha
- Family: Cicadidae
- Genus: Cicadatra
- Species: C. icari

Binomial name
- Cicadatra icari Quartau,Simoẽs and Sanborn, 1998

Species of cicada

Cicadatra icari, commonly known as Icarus cicada, is a species of cicada found in Greece, specifically on the islands of Ikaria and Samos.

== Etymology ==
The species name "icari" comes from Icarus.

== Size ==
Measurements taken from apex of crown to tegmina tips in resting position:

- Body length: Male: 29–31 mm ; Female: 29 mm
- Forewing:
  - Length: Male: 24–25 mm ; Female: 24 mm
  - Width: Male: 10–11 mm ; Female: 11 mm
- Head width: Male: 6–7 mm ; Female: 7 mm
- Mesonotum width: Male: 7–8 mm ; Female: 24 mm

== Distribution ==
Cicadatra icari is endemic to Greece, specifically on the islands of Ikaria and Samos.

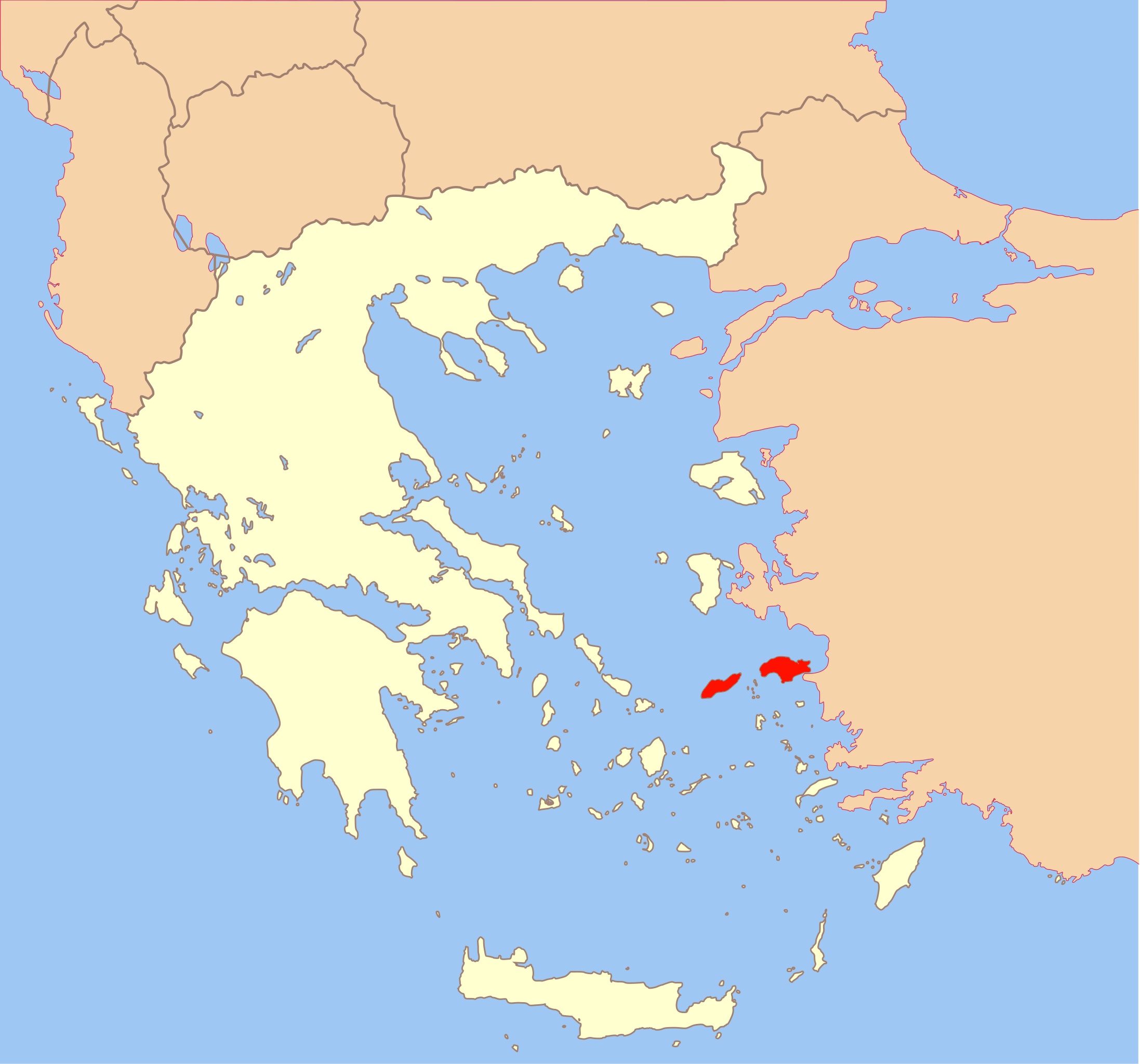
Habitat map

== Acoustic behaviour ==
- Frequency range: 5–17 kHz (dominant band)
- Primary peak: Maximum energy at 9.4 kHz
- Secondary peak: Significant energy concentration near 7 kHz

The echeme song occupies a similar spectral range (5–17 kHz) but shows that shifted energy peak to approximately 8.5 kHz and broadband frequency characteristics maintain.
