= Amphiporeia =

Scientific classification
- Domain: Eukaryota
- Kingdom: Animalia
- Phylum: Arthropoda
- Class: Malacostraca
- Order: Amphipoda
- Family: Bathyporeiidae
- Genus: Amphiporeia; Shoemaker, 1929

Genus of crustaceans

Amphiporeia is a genus of amphipods in the family Bathyporeiidae. There are at least three described species in Amphiporeia.

== Species ==
These three species belong to the genus Amphiporeia:

- Amphiporeia gigantea Bousfield, 1973
- Amphiporeia lawrenciana Shoemaker, 1929
- Amphiporeia virginiana Shoemaker, 1933
