= Gammaracanthus =

- Gammaracanthus lacustris

Scientific classification
- Kingdom: Animalia
- Phylum: Arthropoda
- Clade: Pancrustacea
- Class: Malacostraca
- Order: Amphipoda
- Superfamily: Gammaroidea
- Family: Gammaracanthidae; Bousfield, 1989
- Genus: Gammaracanthus; Spence Bate, 1862

Genus of crustaceans

Gammaracanthus is a genus of amphipods belonging to the monotypic family Gammaracanthidae. The species of this genus are found in Eurasia and North America.

== Species ==
There are four recognized species:

- Gammaracanthus aestuariorum Lomakina, 1952
- Gammaracanthus caspius Sars, 1896
- Gammaracanthus lacustris Sars, 1867
- Gammaracanthus loricatus (Sabine, 1824)
