= Cicadatra karpathosensis =

Scientific classification
- Kingdom: Animalia
- Phylum: Arthropoda
- Class: Insecta
- Order: Hemiptera
- Suborder: Auchenorrhyncha
- Family: Cicadidae
- Genus: Cicadatra
- Species: C. karpathosensis

Binomial name
- Cicadatra karpathosensis Quartau,Simoẽs and Sanborn, 2001

Species of insect

Cicadatra karpathosensis, the Karpathos cicada is a species of cicada found in Greece, specifically on the Karpathos island.

== Etymology ==
The species name karpathosensis refers to the island of Karpathos, which this species is endemic to.

== Size ==
Cicadatra karpathosensis males were discovered in the following size ranges:

- Body length: 28–33 mm
- Forewing length: 22–25 mm
- Forewing width: 8–10 mm
- Head width: 6–7 mm
- Mesonotum width: 7–8 mm

== Acoustic behaviour ==
During courtship, the male typically raises its abdomen to produce a continuous calling song. When examined in detail, this signal consists of rapid pulse units—analysis of nine recordings revealed an average of 46 pulses per second, with individual measurements ranging between 42 and 49 pulses per second.The song's frequency spectrum is most intense between 5 and 17 kHz, peaking at approximately 9.6 kHz, where the energy reaches its maximum. This acoustic pattern is characteristic of the species' mating call.

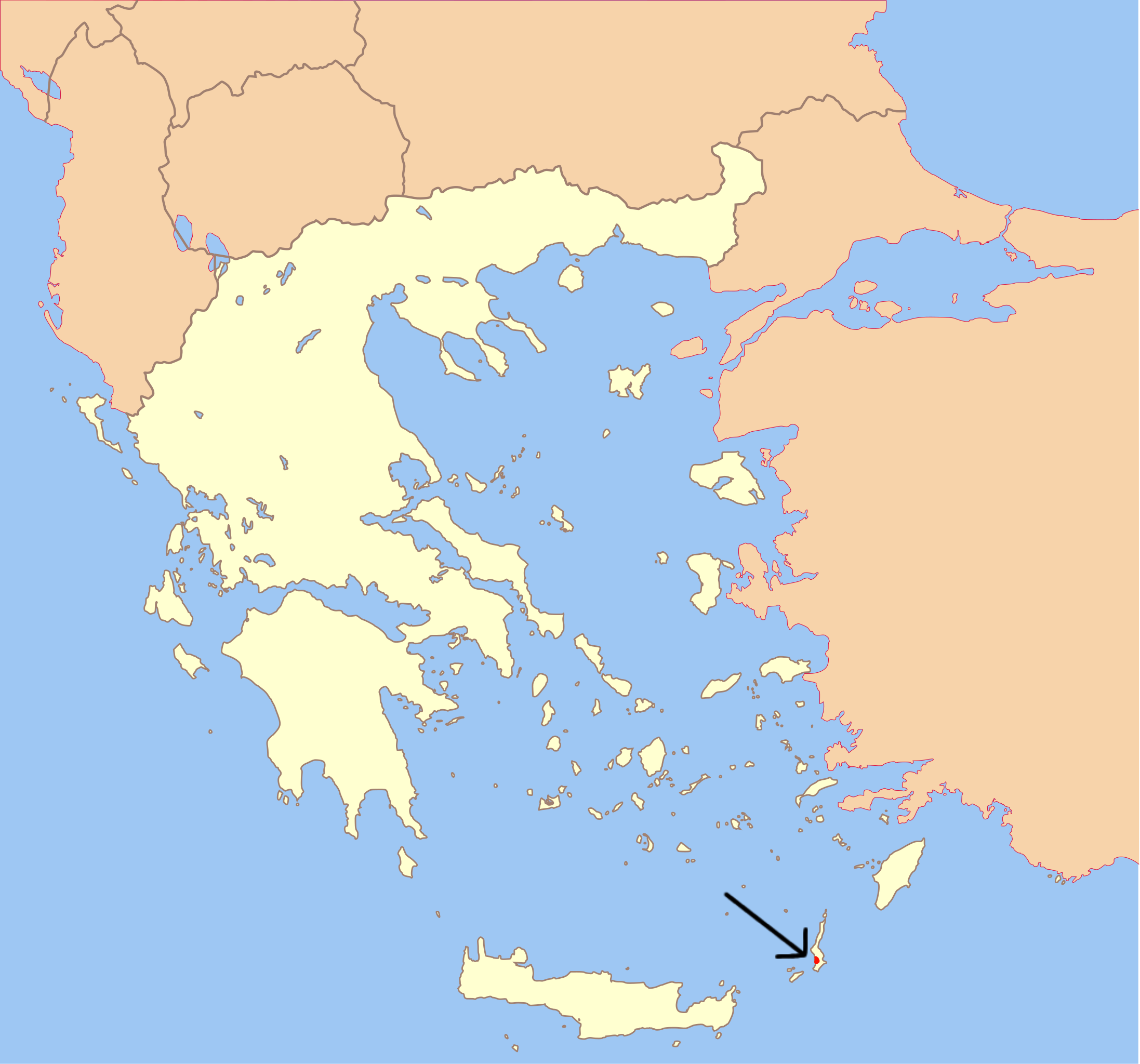
Habitat map

== Habitat ==
Cicadatra karpathosensis inhabits Mediterranean shrubland (maquis) and can be found on various woody plants, including mastic trees (Pistacia lentiscus), Aleppo pines (Pinus halepensis), and peach trees (Prunus persica).
