= Hypsimetopidae =

Scientific classification
- Domain: Eukaryota
- Kingdom: Animalia
- Phylum: Arthropoda
- Class: Malacostraca
- Order: Isopoda
- Suborder: Phreatoicidea
- Family: Hypsimetopidae; Nicholls, 1943

Synonyms
- Hypsimetopinae Nicholls, 1943 Hypsimetopodidae Nicholls, 1943 Nichollsiinae Tiwari, 1955

Family of crustaceans

Hypsimetopidae is a family of freshwater isopods.

== Genera ==
The family contains the following genera:

- Andhracoides Wilson & Ranga Reddy, 2011
- Hyperoedesipus Nicholls and Milner, 1923
- Hypsimetopus Sayce, 1902
- Nichollsia Chopra and Tiwari, 1950
- Phreatoicoides Sayce, 1900
- Pilbarophreatoicus Knott and Halse, 1999
- Speonastes Wilson & Shaik, 2022
