= Mesogammaridae =

Scientific classification
- Domain: Eukaryota
- Kingdom: Animalia
- Phylum: Arthropoda
- Class: Malacostraca
- Order: Amphipoda
- Superfamily: Gammaroidea
- Family: Mesogammaridae

Family of crustaceans

Mesogammaridae is a family of crustaceans belonging to the order Amphipoda.

Genera:

- Eoniphargus Uéno, 1955
- Indoniphargus Straškraba, 1967
- Mesogammarus Tzvetkova, 1965
- Octopupilla Tomikawa, 2007
- Paramesogammarus Bousfield, 1979
- Potiberaba Fišer, Zagmajster & Ferreira, 2013
