= Vagitanus venetus =

Scientific classification
- Kingdom: Animalia
- Phylum: Arthropoda
- Clade: Pancrustacea
- Class: Insecta
- Order: Hemiptera
- Suborder: Auchenorrhyncha
- Family: Cicadidae
- Genus: Vagitanus
- Species: V. venetus

Binomial name
- Vagitanus venetus Emery, Lee, 2024

Species of cicada

Vagitanus venetus is a species of cicada found in Vietnam. It was described by David Lyall Emery and Young June Lee in 2024.

== Etymology ==
Its specific epithet is derived from the Latin word "venetus", meaning "blue-green". It refers to the coloration of the cicada.

== Description ==
Their body length ranges between approximately 18-22mm. Females are taller than males. Overall, the cicadas are mostly colored brown, green and yellow. They have a green or yellow head covered with black markings. Their topside is brown with a yellow or green longitudinal stripe in the middle that gradually narrows, and their underside is exclusively yellow or green.

== Habitat ==
The species occurs in forests at an elevation higher than 1000m throughout northern and central Vietnam.
