= Nichollsia =

Scientific classification
- Domain: Eukaryota
- Kingdom: Animalia
- Phylum: Arthropoda
- Class: Malacostraca
- Order: Isopoda
- Family: Hypsimetopidae
- Genus: Nichollsia; Chopra & Tiwari, 1950

Species
- Nichollsia kashiensis; Nichollsia menoni

Genus of crustaceans

Nichollsia is a genus of isopod crustaceans from India. It comprises two species:

- Nichollsia kashiensis Chopra & Tiwari, 1950
- Nichollsia menoni Tiwari, 1958
