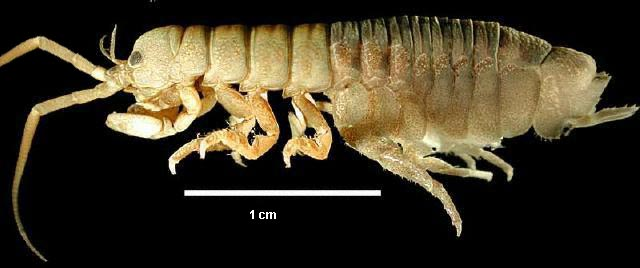
- Eophreatoicus, a freshwater isopod from Kakadu National Park, Australia

Scientific classification
- Kingdom: Animalia
- Phylum: Arthropoda
- Clade: Pancrustacea
- Class: Malacostraca
- Order: Isopoda
- Suborder: Phreatoicidea
- Family: Phreatoicidae; Chilton, 1891

Type genus
- Phreatoicus Chilton, 1883

= Phreatoicidae =

Family of crustaceans

Phreatoicidae is a family of blind, freshwater isopods. They have survived apparently unchanged for 350 million years, and are only found in South Africa, India, Australia and New Zealand. They were first found near Christchurch in 1882 by Charles Chilton. The family Phreatoicidae now contains 13 genera:

- Colacanthotelson Nicholls, 1944
- Colubotelson Nicholls, 1944
- Crenoicus Nicholls, 1944
- Gariwerdeus Wilson & Keable, 2002
- Mesacanthotelson Nicholls, 1944
- Metaphreatoicus Nicholls, 1944
- Naiopegia Wilson & Keable, 2002
- Neophreatoicus Nicholls, 1944
- Notamphisopus Nicholls, 1944
- Onchotelson Nicholls, 1944
- Paraphreatoicus Nicholls, 1944
- Phreatoicus Chilton, 1883
- Uramphisopus Nicholls, 1943
