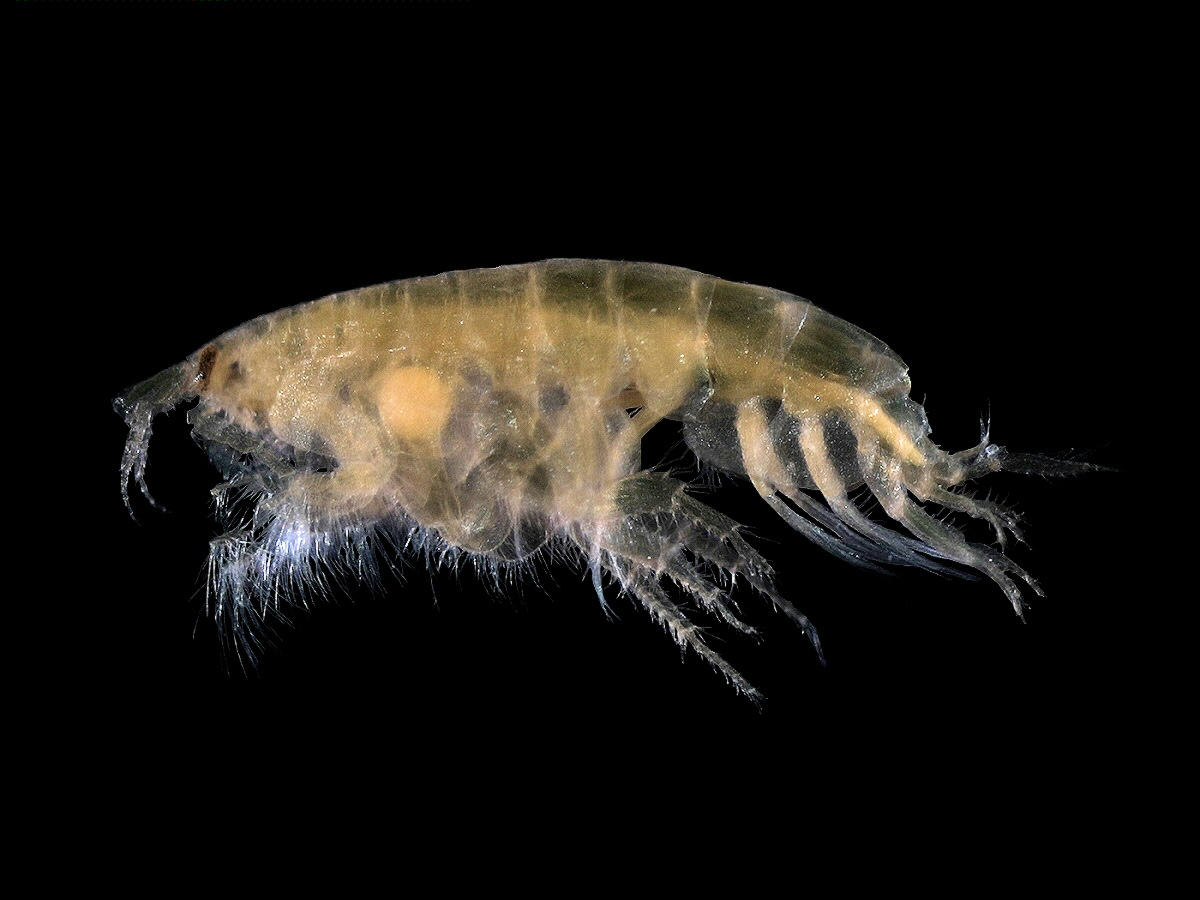
- Bathyporeia elegans

Scientific classification
- Domain: Eukaryota
- Kingdom: Animalia
- Phylum: Arthropoda
- Class: Malacostraca
- Order: Amphipoda
- Superfamily: Gammaroidea
- Family: Bathyporeiidae d'Udekem d'Acoz, 2011

= Bathyporeiidae =

Family of crustaceans

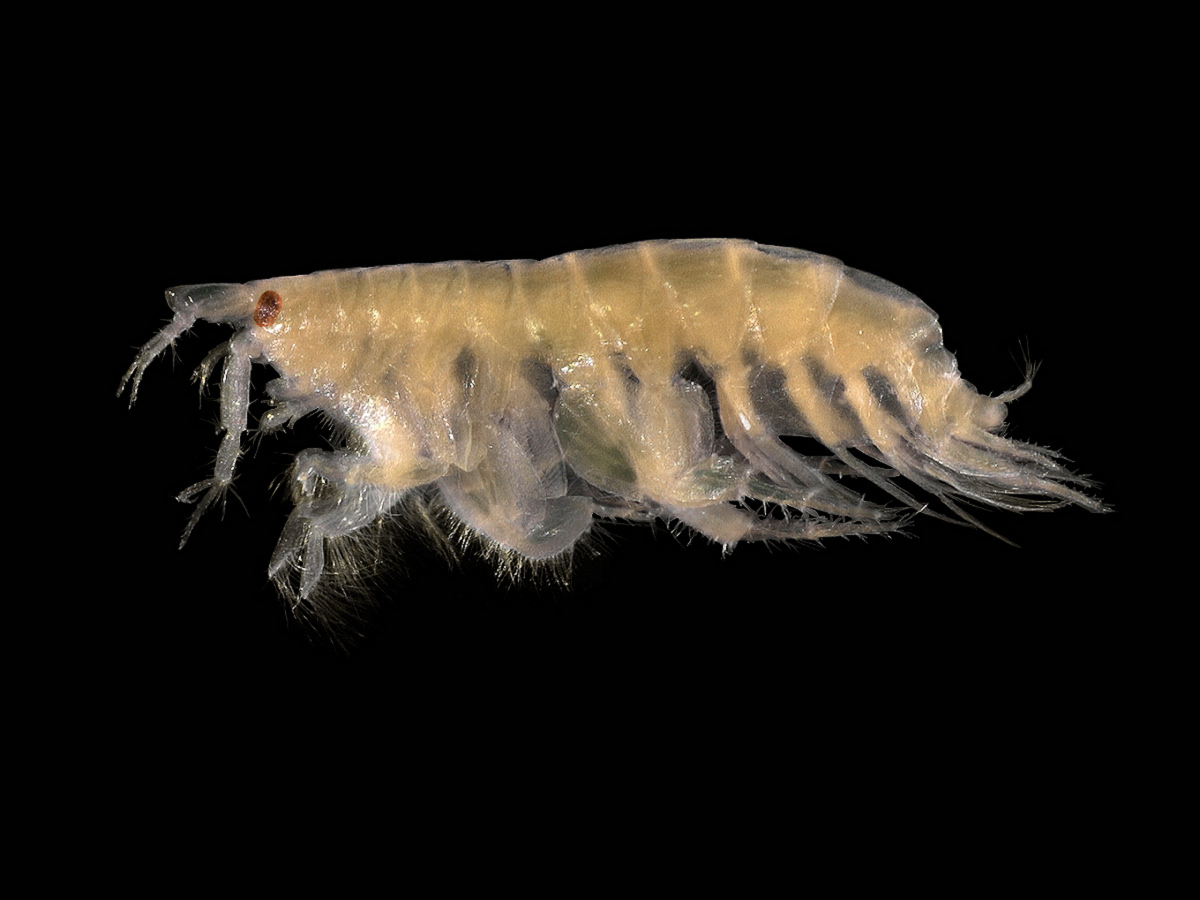
Bathyporeia pelagica

Bathyporeiidae is a family of amphipods in the order Amphipoda. There are two genera in Bathyporeiidae:

- Amphiporeia Shoemaker, 1929
- Bathyporeia Lindström, 1855
