= Anisogammaridae =

Scientific classification
- Kingdom: Animalia
- Phylum: Arthropoda
- Clade: Pancrustacea
- Class: Malacostraca
- Order: Amphipoda
- Superfamily: Gammaroidea
- Family: Anisogammaridae; Bousfield, 1977

Genera
- See text

Family of crustaceans

Anisogammaridae is a family of small benthic amphipods, endemic to the northern part of the Pacific Rim. The family contains the following genera:

- Anisogammarus Derzhavin, 1927
- Barrowgammarus Bousfield, 1979
- Carineogammarus Bousfield, 1979
- Eogammarus Birstein, 1933
- Eurypodogammarus Hou, Morino & Li, 2005
- Fuxiana Sket, 2000
- Fuxigammarus Sket & Fišer, 2009
- Jesogammarus Bousfield, 1979
- Locustogammarus Bousfield, 1979
- Ramellogammarus Bousfield, 1979
- Spasskogammarus Bousfield, 1979
- Spinulogammarus Tzvetkova, 1972
