= Emathia (cicada) =

Scientific classification
- Kingdom: Animalia
- Phylum: Arthropoda
- Clade: Pancrustacea
- Class: Insecta
- Order: Hemiptera
- Suborder: Auchenorrhyncha
- Family: Cicadidae
- Genus: Emathia

Genus of true bugs

Emathia is a genus of cicadas in the family Cicadidae, with at least two described species.

== Species ==
These two species belong to the genus Emathia:

- Emathia aegrota Stal, 1866^{c g}
- Emathia takensis (Boulard, 2006)^{c g}

Data sources: i = ITIS, c = Catalogue of Life, g = GBIF, b = Bugguide.net
