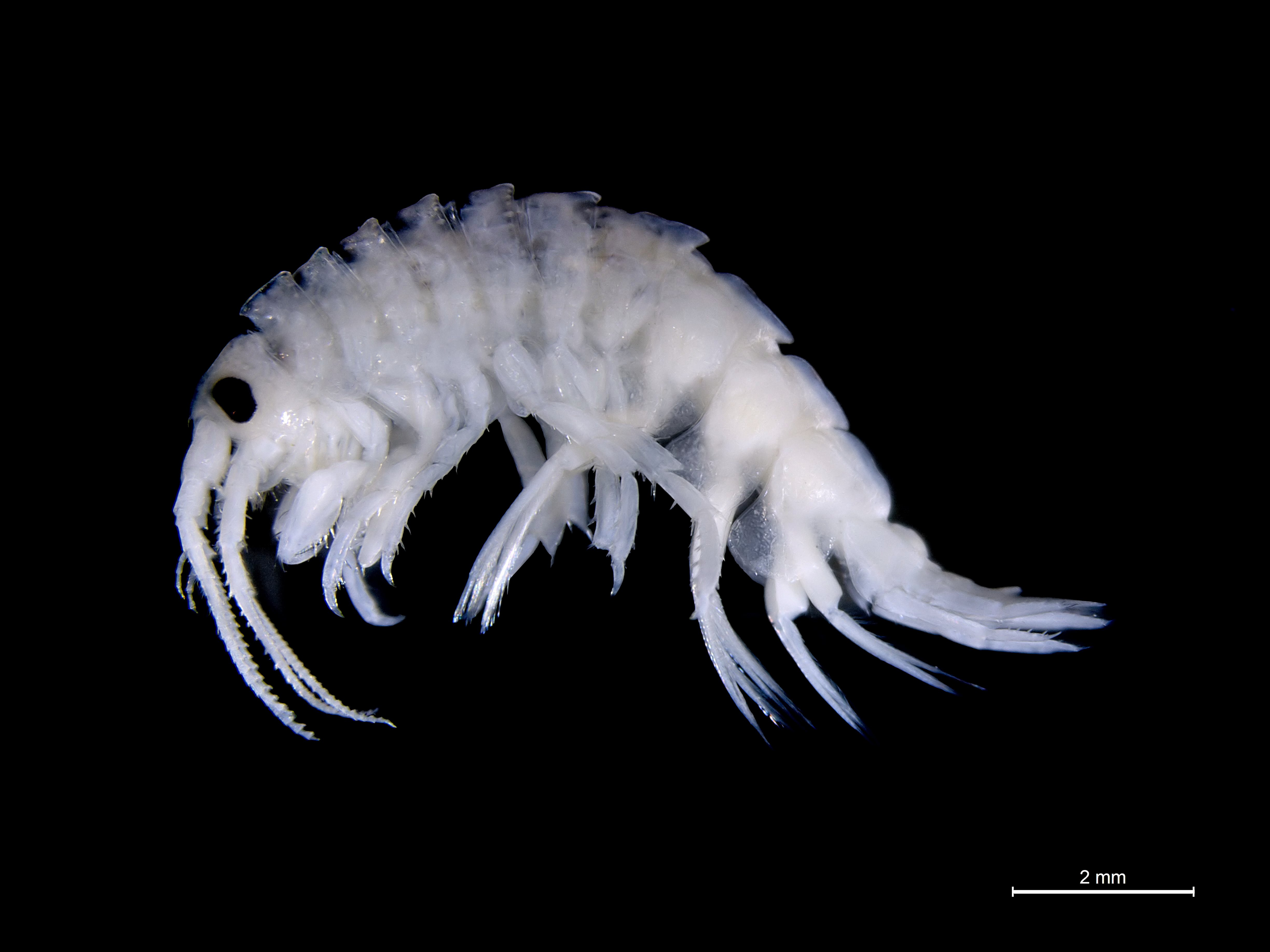
- Gammarellus angulosus

Scientific classification
- Kingdom: Animalia
- Phylum: Arthropoda
- Clade: Pancrustacea
- Class: Malacostraca
- Order: Amphipoda
- Parvorder: Eusiridira
- Superfamily: Eusiroidea
- Family: Gammarellidae; Bousfield, 1977

Genera
- See text

= Gammarellidae =

Family of crustaceans

Gammarellidae is a family of amphipods containing three genera:

- Austroregia J. L. Barnard, 1989
- Chosroes Stebbing, 1888
- Gammarellus Herbst, 1793
