= Thomas Sergeant Hall =

Australian geologist and biologist

Thomas Sergeant Hall (23 December 1858 – 21 December 1915) was an Australian geologist and biologist, recipient of The Murchison Fund in 1901.

== Early life ==
Hall was born in Geelong to Thomas March Hall and Elizabeth, née Walshe.

== Career ==
One of his major discoveries was the key to the unravelling of the complex Ordovician sequence.

== Family ==
He married Miss Eva Lucie Annie Hill on 21 December 1891, who survived him along with three sons and a daughter.
