= Amphisopodidae =

Scientific classification
- Kingdom: Animalia
- Phylum: Arthropoda
- Clade: Pancrustacea
- Class: Malacostraca
- Order: Isopoda
- Suborder: Phreatoicidea
- Family: Amphisopodidae; Nicholls, 1943

Type genus
- Amphisopus Nicholls, 1926

Family of crustaceans

Amphisopodidae is a family of freshwater isopods.

== Genera ==
Amphisopodidae includes the following genera:

- Amphisopus Nicholls, 1926
- Eophreatoicus Nicholls, 1926
- Eremisopus Wilson & Keable, 2002
- Kakadubeh Wilson & Humphrey, 2020
- Paramphisopus Nicholls, 1943
- Peludo Wilson & Keable, 2002
- Phreatomerus Sheppard, 1927
- Platypyga Wilson & Keable, 2002
- †Protamphisopus Nicholls, 1943
