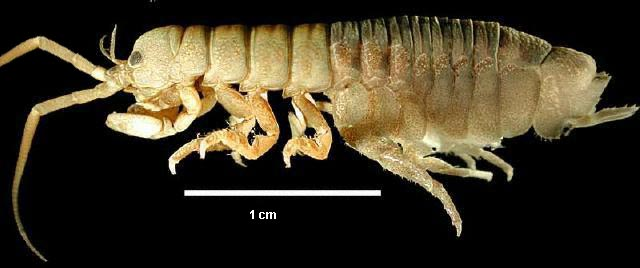
- Eophreatoicus, a freshwater isopod from Kakadu National Park, Australia

Scientific classification
- Kingdom: Animalia
- Phylum: Arthropoda
- Clade: Pancrustacea
- Class: Malacostraca
- Order: Isopoda
- Suborder: Phreatoicidea; Stebbing, 1893

= Phreatoicidea =

Phreatoicidea Temporal range: Permian–Present

Suborder of crustaceans

Phreatoicidea is a suborder of isopod crustaceans. Extant species are confined to freshwater environments in South Africa, India, and Oceania. This seemingly Gondwana-derived distribution belies the fact that the group once had a cosmopolitan distribution; fossils which can be assigned to the Phreatoicidea are the oldest isopod fossils, and are found throughout the world. In the intervening 325 million years, phreatoicideans have changed little, and are thus considered living fossils.

The first Australian phreatoicidean was described by Charles Chilton in 1891. Two families are represented in Australia: Amphisopodidae in the interior of Australia, and in the west, and Phreatoicidae in New South Wales, Victoria and Tasmania.

== Families ==
The suborder contains the following families:

- Amphisopodidae Nicholls, 1943
- Hypsimetopidae Nicholls, 1943
- Mesamphisopidae Nicholls, 1943
- † Palaeophreatoicidae Birstein, 1962
- Phreatoicidae Chilton, 1891
- Phreatoicopsidae Nicholls, 1943
- Ponderellidae Wilson & Keable, 2004

== See also ==
- Nichollsia
