= Bathynomus apothecarius =

- Holotype female viewed dorsally, laterally, and ventrally

Scientific classification
- Kingdom: Animalia
- Phylum: Arthropoda
- Clade: Pancrustacea
- Class: Malacostraca
- Order: Isopoda
- Family: Cirolanidae
- Genus: Bathynomus
- Species: B. apothecarius

Binomial name
- Bathynomus apothecarius Gallagher & Riehl, 2026

Species of marine isopod

Bathynomus apothecarius is a species of giant isopod found in the Western Atlantic Ocean (The Bahamas, Tongue of the Ocean).

Bathynomus apothecarius was described in 2026, following other giant isopods described in the preceding decade: B. maxeyorum in 2016, B. raksasa in 2020, B. yucatanensis in 2022, and B. vaderi in 2025. These new discoveries suggest that the species diversity of giant isopods has been underestimated due to misidentifications.

Bathynomus apothecarius is most closely related to B. maxeyorum.

== Morphology ==
Reaching size from 5.2 to 8.4 centimeters, it belongs to the giant class of giant isopods, as opposed to supergiant giant isopods that reach over 15 centimeters at maturity. It can be distinguished from other Atlantic giant isopod species by its unique clypeus, semicircular pleotelson, and other morphological features.
