= Bathynomus brucei =

Scientific classification
- Kingdom: Animalia
- Phylum: Arthropoda
- Class: Malacostraca
- Order: Isopoda
- Family: Cirolanidae
- Genus: Bathynomus
- Species: B. brucei

Binomial name
- Bathynomus brucei Lowry & Dempsey, 2006

Species of giant isopod

Bathynomus brucei is a species of giant isopod first described in 2006. It was first located off of the coast of Australia, east of Flynn reef, though the range extends from waters of south-east of Asia to waters around the north of Australia.

B. brucei is the largest 'giant' member of Bathynomus, a specimen collected 400 metres below sea level measuring 154 mm (6.1 in) long. Members of the larger 'supergiant' group of Bathynomus species such as B. giganteus and B. kensleyi are known to grow to lengths of almost 20 in (510 mm).

== Description ==
As with all other members of Bathynomus, B. brucei has seven pairs of pereopods and an exoskeleton composed of overlapping segments, the first segment of which is fused to the head.

B. brucei is roughly twice as long as it is wide. It has nine pleotelsonic spines along the distal edge of the central tail fin (the telson), including seven distal and two lateral. It has a short setal fringe on the margins of the exopods, a feature only shared by B. immanis.
