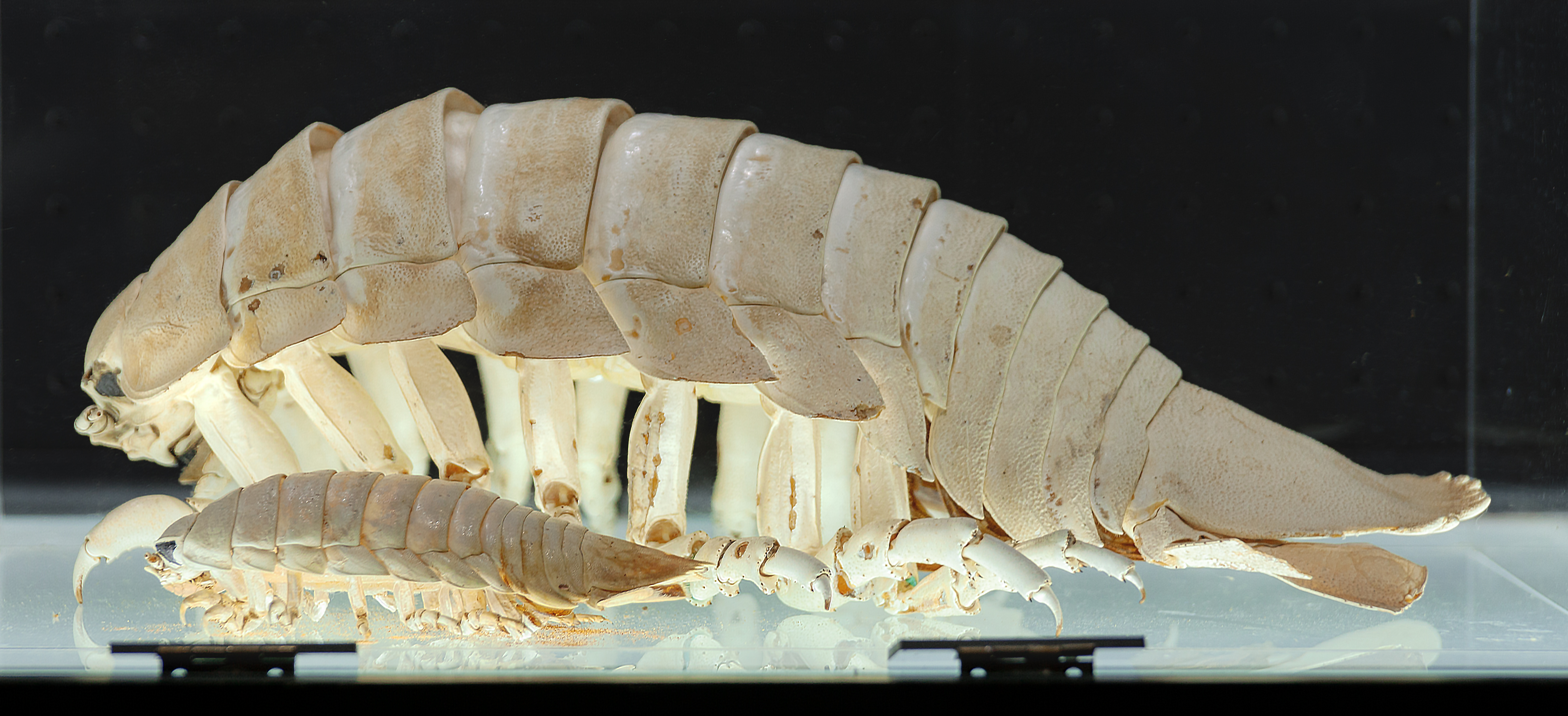
- Bathynomus doederleini (front) and Bathynomus kensleyi (behind)

Scientific classification
- Kingdom: Animalia
- Phylum: Arthropoda
- Clade: Pancrustacea
- Class: Malacostraca
- Order: Isopoda
- Family: Cirolanidae
- Genus: Bathynomus; A. Milne-Edwards, 1879

= Giant isopod =

Giant isopods Temporal range: Rupelian–Recent

Genus of crustaceans

Giant isopods are large marine isopods in the genus Bathynomus. They are bottom-dwelling deep-sea scavengers that are abundant in the Atlantic, Pacific, and Indian oceans.

Bathynomus giganteus, the species upon which the generitype is based, is often considered the largest isopod in the world, though other comparably poorly known species of Bathynomus may reach similar sizes. Giant isopods are noted for their resemblance to the much smaller terrestrial woodlice, to which they are related.

French zoologist Alphonse Milne-Edwards was the first to describe the genus in 1879 after his colleague Alexander Agassiz collected a juvenile male B. giganteus from the Gulf of Mexico. This was an exciting discovery for both scientists and the public, as at the time the idea of a lifeless or "azoic" deep ocean had only recently been refuted by the work of Sir Charles Wyville Thomson and others. No females were recovered until 1891.

== Morphology ==
Size of Bathynomus giganteus compared to a human hand

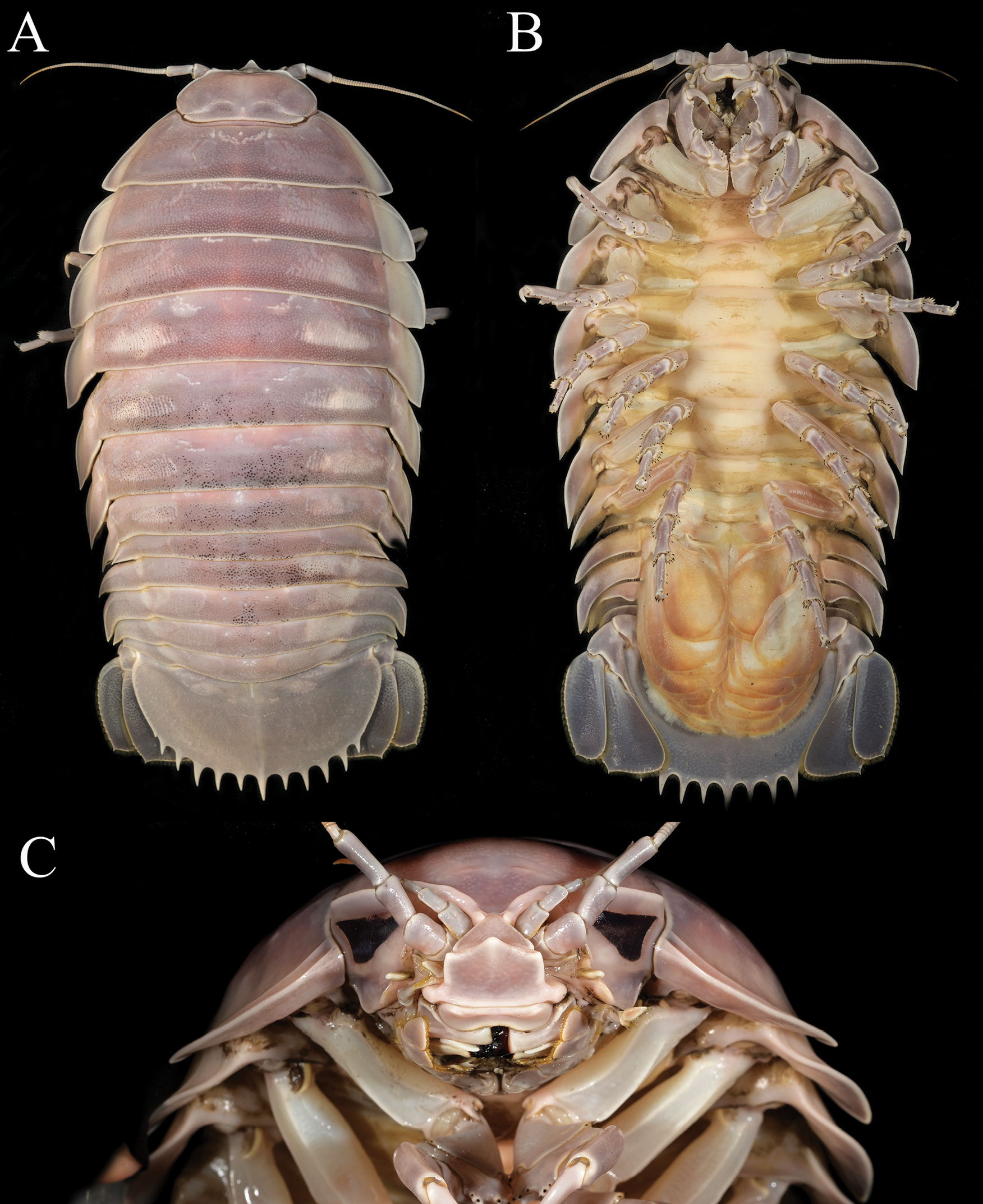
Top, bottom and frontal view of Bathynomus vaderi

Giant isopods are an example of deep-sea gigantism (cf. giant squid), as they are far larger than other isopod groups. Bathynomus can be divided into "giant" species where the adults generally are between 8 and 15 cm (3.1 and 5.9 in) long and "supergiant" species where the adults are typically between 17 and 50 cm (6.7 and 19.7 in). One of the supergiants, B. giganteus, reaches a typical length between 19 and 36 cm (7.5 and 14.2 in); an individual claimed to be 76 cm (30 in) long has been reported by the popular press, but the largest confirmed was c. 50 cm (20 in).

Their morphology resembles that of their terrestrial relatives, the woodlice. Their bodies are dorsoventrally compressed, protected by a rigid, calcareous exoskeleton composed of overlapping segments. Like some woodlice, they can curl up into a ball, exposing only the tough dorsal shell. This protects them from predators trying to strike at the more vulnerable underside. The first shell segment is fused to the head; the most posterior segments are often fused, as well, forming a "caudal shield" over the shortened abdomen (pleon).

The large eyes are compound with nearly 4,000 facets, sessile, and spaced far apart on the head. They have two pairs of antennae. The uniramous thoracic legs or pereiopods are arranged in seven pairs, the first of which is modified into maxillipeds to manipulate and bring food to the four sets of jaws. The abdomen has five segments called pleonites, each with a pair of biramous pleopods. These are modified into swimming legs and rami, flat respiratory structures acting as gills. Giant isopods are a pale lilac or pinkish in coloration.

The individual species generally resemble each other but can be separated by various morphological features, notably the number (7–13) and shape (straight or upturned) of the spines on the pleotelson ("tail"), shape (simple or bifid) of the central spine on the pleotelson, and the shape and structure of the uropods and pereopods.

Giant isopods like Bathynomus giganteus store substantial organic reserves in their midgut gland and fat body, with lipids forming a significant component, particularly in the fat body where triacylglycerols make up 88% of total lipids.

== Range and habitat ==
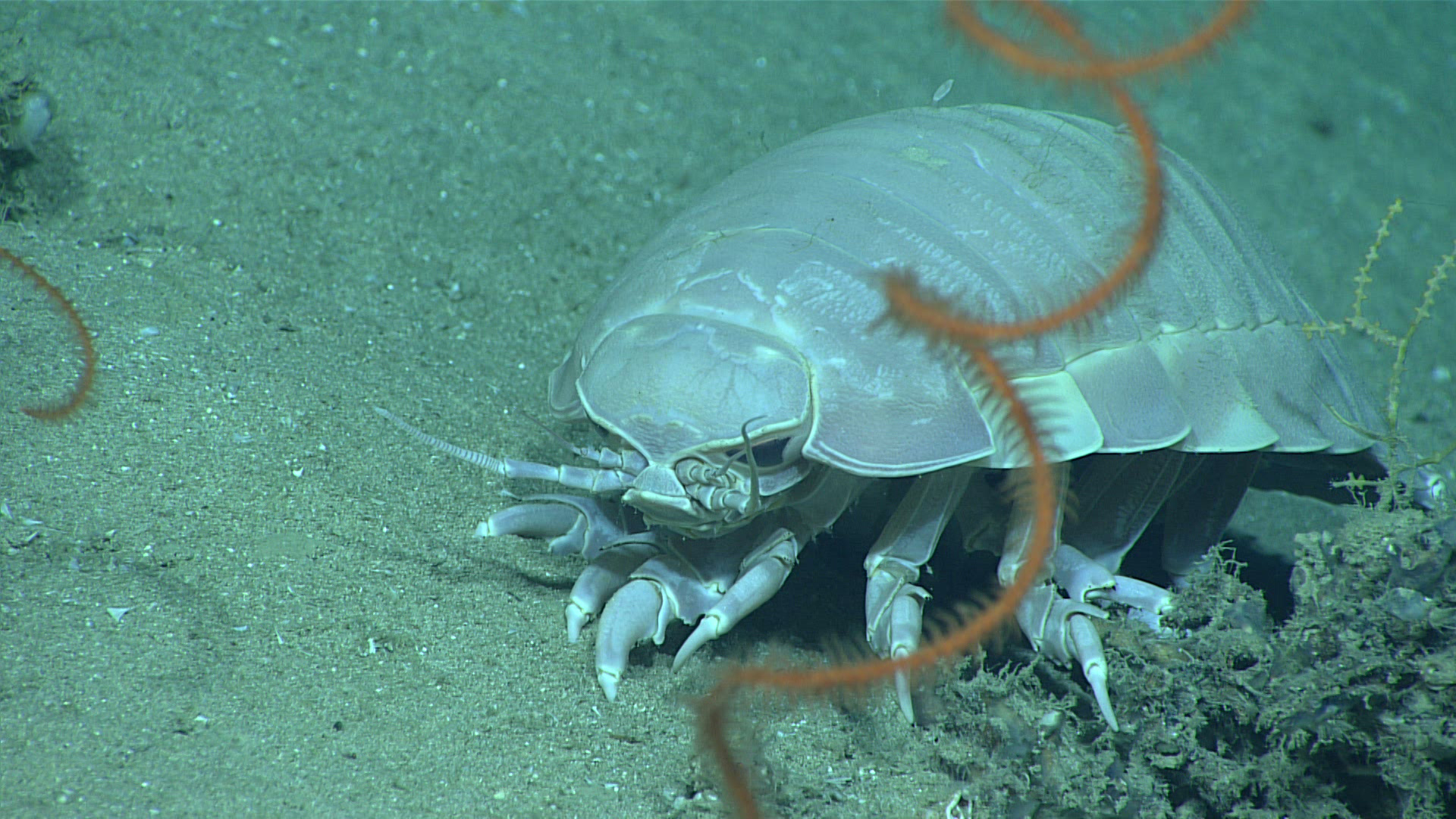
Bathynomus giganteus in the Gulf of Mexico

Giant isopods have been recorded in the West Atlantic from the US state of Georgia to Brazil, including the Gulf of Mexico and the Caribbean. The four known Atlantic species are B. obtusus, B. miyarei, B. maxeyorum, and B. giganteus, and the last of these is the only species recorded off the United States. The remaining Bathynomus species are all restricted to the Indo-Pacific.

No known species occurs in both the Atlantic and Indo-Pacific. Previous records of B. giganteus from the Indo-Pacific are now considered misidentifications of other species. Giant isopods are unknown from the East Atlantic or East Pacific. The greatest species richness (five species) is found off eastern Australia, but it is possible other regions that are not as well-sampled match this figure. In general, the distributions of giant isopods are imperfectly known, and undescribed species may exist.

They are mainly found from the gloomy sublittoral zone at a depth of 170 m (560 ft) to the pitch darkness of the bathyal zone at 2,140 m (7,020 ft), where pressures are high and temperatures are very low. A few species from this genus have been reported from shallower depths, notably B. miyarei between 22 and 280 m (72 and 919 ft), the poorly known B. decemspinosus between 70 and 80 m (230 and 260 ft), and B. doederleini as shallow as 100 m (330 ft).

The depth record for any giant isopod is 2,500 m (8,200 ft) for B. kensleyi, but this species also occurs as shallow as 300 m (980 ft). Over 80% of B. giganteus are found at a depth between 365 and 730 m (1,198 and 2,395 ft). In regions with both giant and supergiant species, the former mainly live on the continental slope, while the latter mainly live on the bathyal plain. Although Bathynomus have been recorded in water as warm as 20 °C (68 °F), they are primarily found in much colder places. For example, during a survey of the deep-sea fauna of Exuma Sound in the Bahamas, B. giganteus was found to be common in water between 3.25 and 13 °C (37.8 and 55.4 °F), but more abundant towards the lower temperature.

In contrast, preliminary studies indicate that B. doederleinii stops feeding when the temperature falls below 3 °C (37 °F). This lower temperature limit may explain their absence from temperate and frigid regions where seas at the depth preferred by Bathynomus often are colder. They are thought to prefer a muddy or clay substrate and lead solitary lives.

Giant isopods collected along the east coast of Australia by setting traps exhibit a variation in diversity with water depth. The deeper the water, the fewer number of species found, and the larger the species tended to be. The giant isopods found in very deep waters off Australia were compared to those found off Mexico and India. From the fossil record, Bathynomus is thought to have existed more than 160 million years ago, so it did not evolve independently in all three locations, but since then Bathynomus likely would show divergent evolution in the various locations. However, the giant isopods in all three locations are almost identical in appearance (although some differences are seen, and they are separate species). This reduced phenotypic divergence is linked to the extremely low light levels of their habitat.

== Diet ==
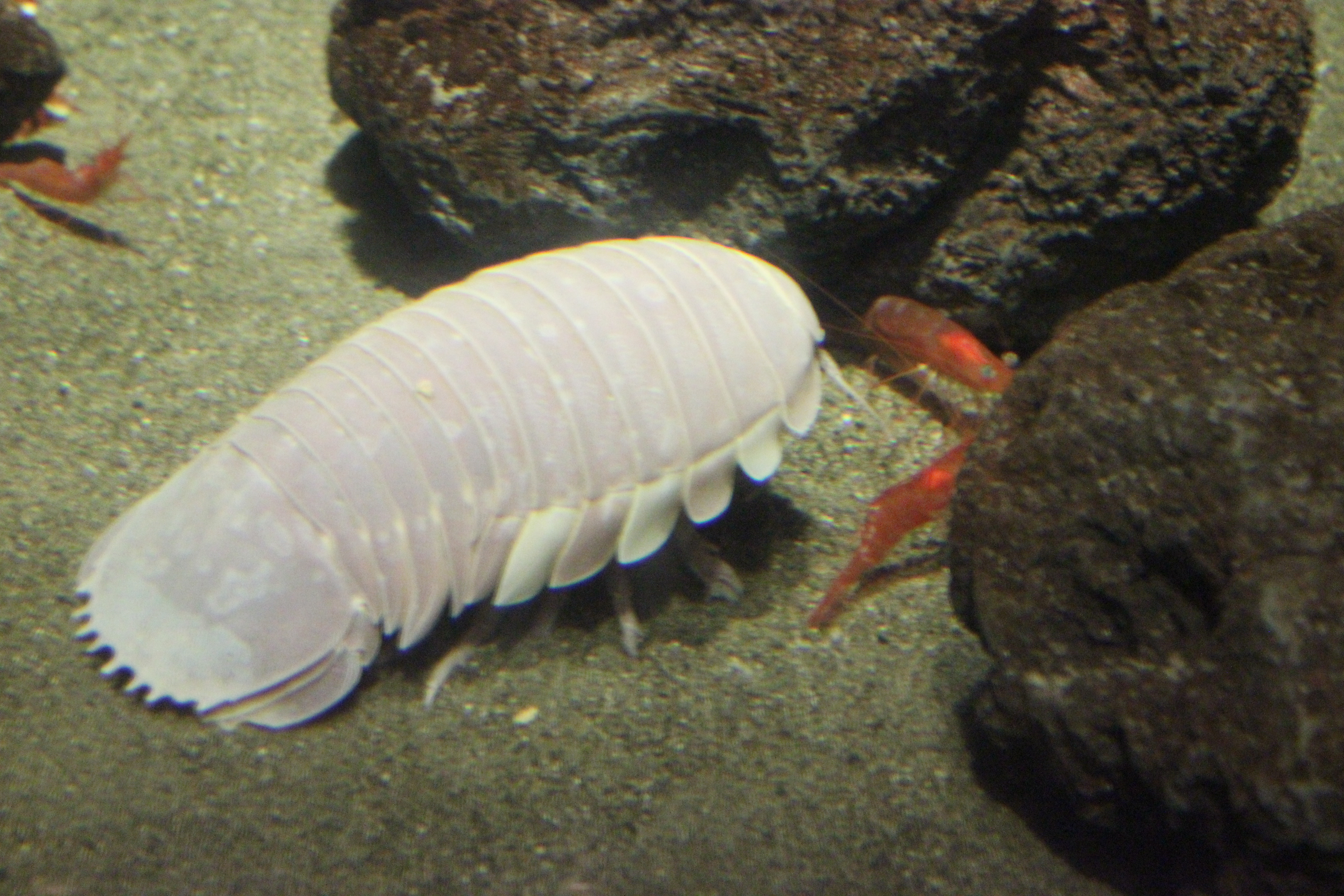
A giant isopod and shrimp

Giant isopods are important scavengers in the deep-sea benthic environment. They are mostly carnivorous and feed on dead whales, fish, and squid. They may also prey on slow-moving animals such as sea cucumbers, sponges, radiolarians, nematodes, and other zoobenthos, and perhaps even live fish.

As food is scarce in the deep-ocean biome, giant isopods must take advantage of whatever food they have available. They are adapted to long periods of famine and have been known to survive over 5 years without food in captivity. When a significant source of food is encountered, giant isopods gorge themselves to the point that they have difficulty moving. As an adaptation they have an enlarged stomach and the ability to drastically lower their metabolism. The stomach has low levels of common digestive bacteria, and mostly rely on Chlamydiae bacteria to break down the food and is important for lipid storage. A study examining the digestive system contents of 1651 specimens of B. giganteus found that fish were most commonly eaten, followed by cephalopods and decapods, particularly carideans and galatheids.

== Reproduction and life cycle ==
Mature females develop a brood pouch or marsupium when sexually active, the pouch being formed by overlapping oostegites or brood plates grown from the medial border of the pereiopods. The young isopods emerge from the marsupium as miniatures of the adults, known as mancas. This is not a larval stage; the mancas are fully developed, lacking only the last pair of pereiopods. The relative seasonal abundance of B. giganteus mancas and juveniles suggests a peak in reproductive capacity in the autumn and winter.

As of 2021 there were only two documented instances of ovigerous (egg-bearing) giant isopod females being captured. This suggests that ovigerous individuals may seclude themselves in pits dug in the ocean floor substrate and cease foraging during the incubation of the eggs.

A study of B. giganteus and B. miyarei found that larger, sexually mature individuals tended to be found in shallower regions.

The approximate lifespan of B. giganteus has been estimated to be 7.7 years for females and 6 years for males, and that of B. miyarei has been estimated at 6 years for females and 9 years for males.

== Relationship to humans ==
Giant isopods are occasionally eaten as novelty food, such as in East Asian cuisine like ramen; in Vietnam, however, they are actively sought as a delicacy. Relative to total size, there is not very much "meat" to be harvested.

Giant isopods are killed in large numbers as bycatch in the commercial fishing of other species such as the monkfish Lophius gastrophysus. During 14 industrial fishing cruises in 2001, 55,475 giant isopods were caught as bycatch. If thrown back into the sea following capture as bycatch, the post-release mortality of giant isopods is estimated to lie between 50 and 100%, due to the stress of capture and spending time on board. Commercial fisheries typically do not monitor the bycatch of giant isopods, making it difficult to ascertain the scale of bycatch killings.

Giant isopods are known to attack and eat fish caught in trawl nets.

Large quantities of plastic were found during analysis of the stomach contents of three giant isopods in the Gulf of Mexico.

Giant isopods are kept in public aquariums. A captive specimen "No. 1" of the Toba Aquarium gained notoriety in Japan after repeatedly ignoring food given to him by caregivers, surviving for 5 years without eating until his death in 2014.

== Classification ==
The genus currently contains the following known species:

- Bathynomus affinis
- Bathynomus apothecarius
- Bathynomus brucei
- Bathynomus bruscai
- †Bathynomus civisi
- Bathynomus crosnieri
- Bathynomus decemspinosus
- Bathynomus doederleini
- Bathynomus giganteus
- Bathynomus immanis
- Bathynomus jamesi
- Bathynomus kapala
- Bathynomus keablei
- Bathynomus kensleyi
- †Bathynomus kominatoensis
- Bathynomus lowryi
- Bathynomus maxeyorum
- Bathynomus miyarei
- Bathynomus obtusus
- Bathynomus paracelensis (now considered junior synonym of Bathynomus vaderi)
- Bathynomus pelor
- Bathynomus propinquus
- Bathynomus raksasa
- Bathynomus richeri
- †Bathynomus sismondai
- †Bathynomus steatopigia
- †Bathynomus undecimspinosus
- Bathynomus vaderi
- Bathynomus wilsoni
- Bathynomus yucatanensis

== Fossil record ==
Fossil specimens of Bathynomus are known extending back to at least the Early Oligocene (Rupelian) of Italy, with other fossils being known from Japan and Spain.

== See also ==
- Supergiant amphipod
