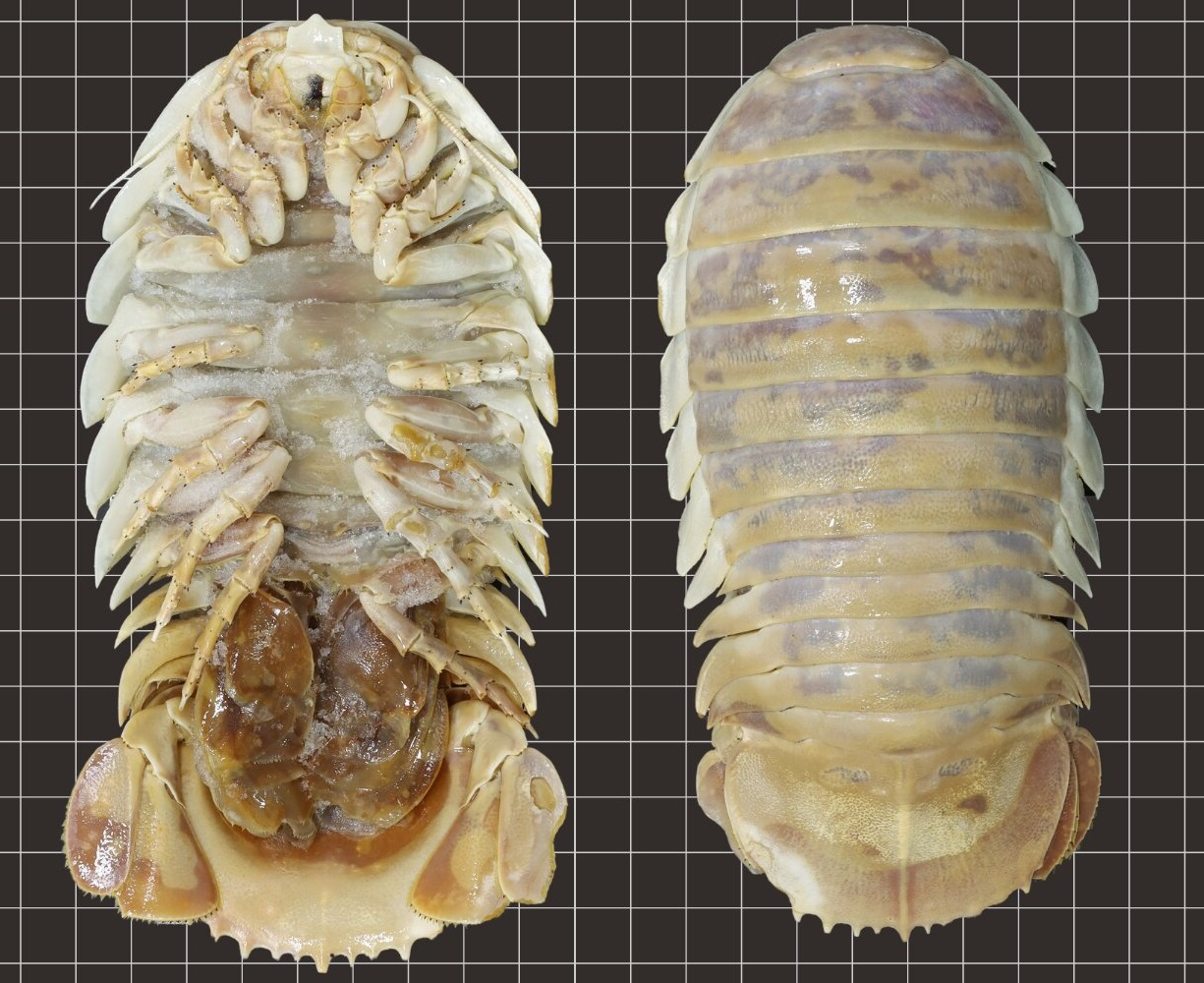
- Top and bottom view of a dead Bathynomus yucatanensis

Scientific classification
- Kingdom: Animalia
- Phylum: Arthropoda
- Class: Malacostraca
- Order: Isopoda
- Family: Cirolanidae
- Genus: Bathynomus
- Species: B. yucatanensis

Binomial name
- Bathynomus yucatanensis Huang, Kawai & Bruce, 2022

= Bathynomus yucatanensis =

Species of crustacean

Bathynomus yucatanensis is a species of giant isopod that was discovered in the Gulf of Mexico. Giant isopods (Bathynomus) are bottom-dwelling marine scavengers in the order Isopoda.

Bathynomus yucatanensis was jointly published as a new species of Bathynomus in 2022 by Dr. Ming-Chih Huang, Associate Professor at the National University of Tainan Department of Biological Sciences and Technology, Taiwan (ROC), Dr. Tadashi Kawai, President of the International Association of Astacology, and Nile L. Bruce, Honorary Researcher of invertebrates at the Queensland Museum of Australia.

== Discovery ==
Bathynomus yucatanensis was discovered in the Gulf of Mexico and was initially identified as a larger relative, Bathynomus giganteus. The specimen was preserved at Japan’s Enoshima Aquarium, and was later acquired by Dr. Ming-Chih Huang of National University of Tainan’s Department of Biological Sciences and Technology for identification and comparison purposes. During the process, the two specimens were found to be morphologically distinctive from each other. The nucleotide sequences of two genes, the COI (cytochrome c oxidase subunit 1) and 16S rRNA, were used to compare the two specimens through molecular biotechnology. The specimen was later confirmed as a new species after being peer-reviewed and jointly-identified by Dr. Tadashi Kawai, President of the International Association of Astacology, and Nile L. Bruce, Honorary Researcher of invertebrates at the Queensland Museum of Australia. The specimen was named after the location of its original discovery, the Yucatán Peninsula of the Gulf of Mexico. This species is the third deep-sea isopod to be found in the Gulf of Mexico; the other two were the Bathynomus giganteus discovered in 1879, and the Bathynomus maxeyorum published in 2016. The researchers hypothesized that there may yet be further undiscovered species living in the Gulf of Mexico.

== Morphological Features ==
Bathynomus yucatanensis is about 10 inches (25 cm) in length and 5 inches (13 cm) in width.
