= Toba Aquarium =

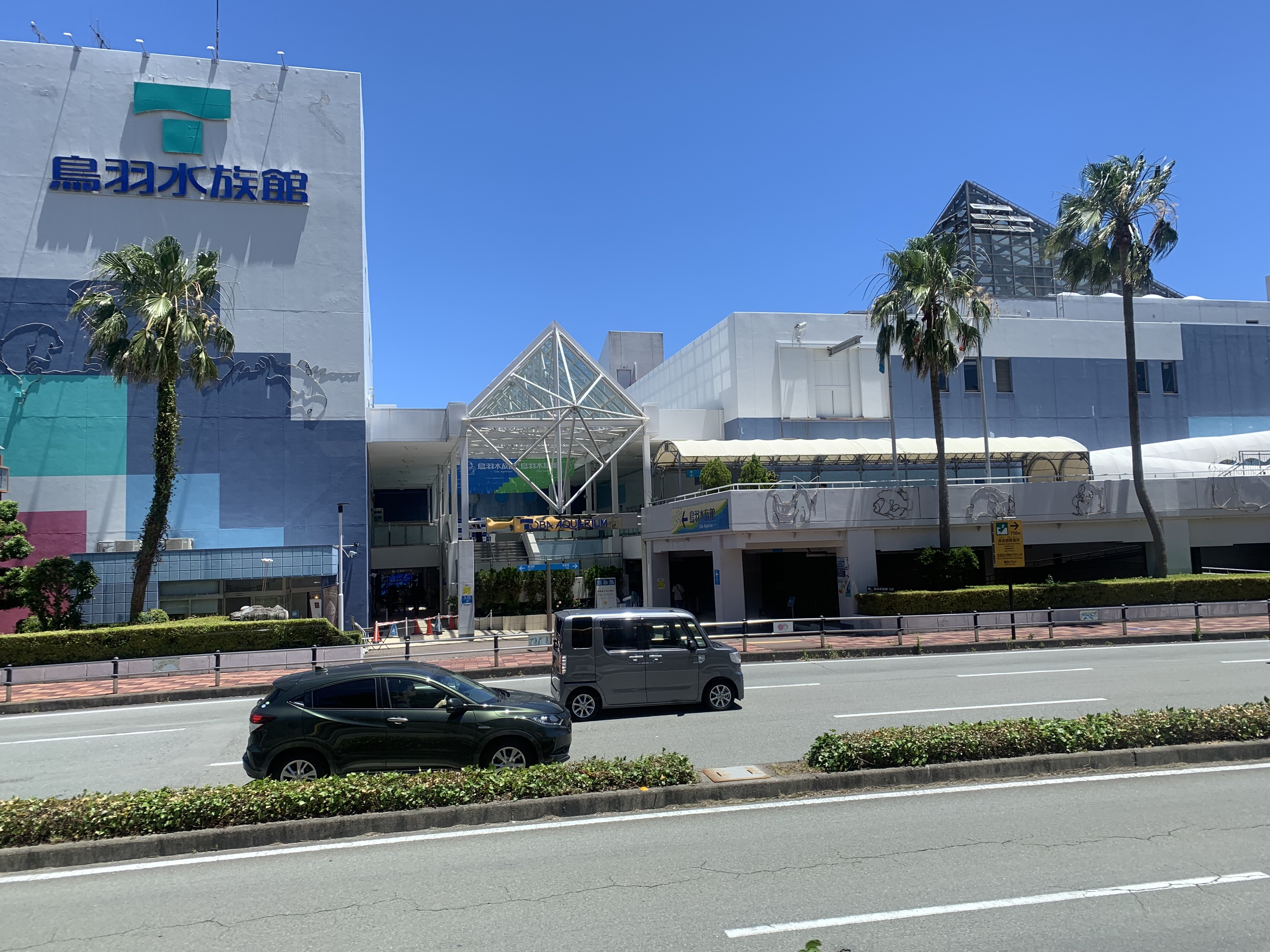
- Toba Aquarium Front entrance
- Interactive map of Toba Aquarium
- 34°28′54″N 136°50′45″E
- Date opened: May 1955
- Location: Toba, Mie, Japan
- Floor space: 24,981 m^{2} (268,890 sq ft)
- No. of animals: 30,000
- No. of species: 1,200
- Total volume of tanks: 6 million litres (1,600,000 US gal)
- Annual visitors: 947,000 (2013)
- Memberships: JAZA
- Website: www.aquarium.co.jp/index.php

Toba Aquarium (鳥羽水族館, Toba-suizokukan) is a public aquarium in Toba, Mie, Japan.

The aquarium is described as a "quality aquarium", housing some 25,000 individuals representing 1,200 species in 12 distinct zones. It is accredited as a Registered Museum by the Museum Act from Ministry of Education, Culture, Sports, Science and Technology.

In 2015, the number of visitors to the aquarium exceeded 60 million.

== History ==
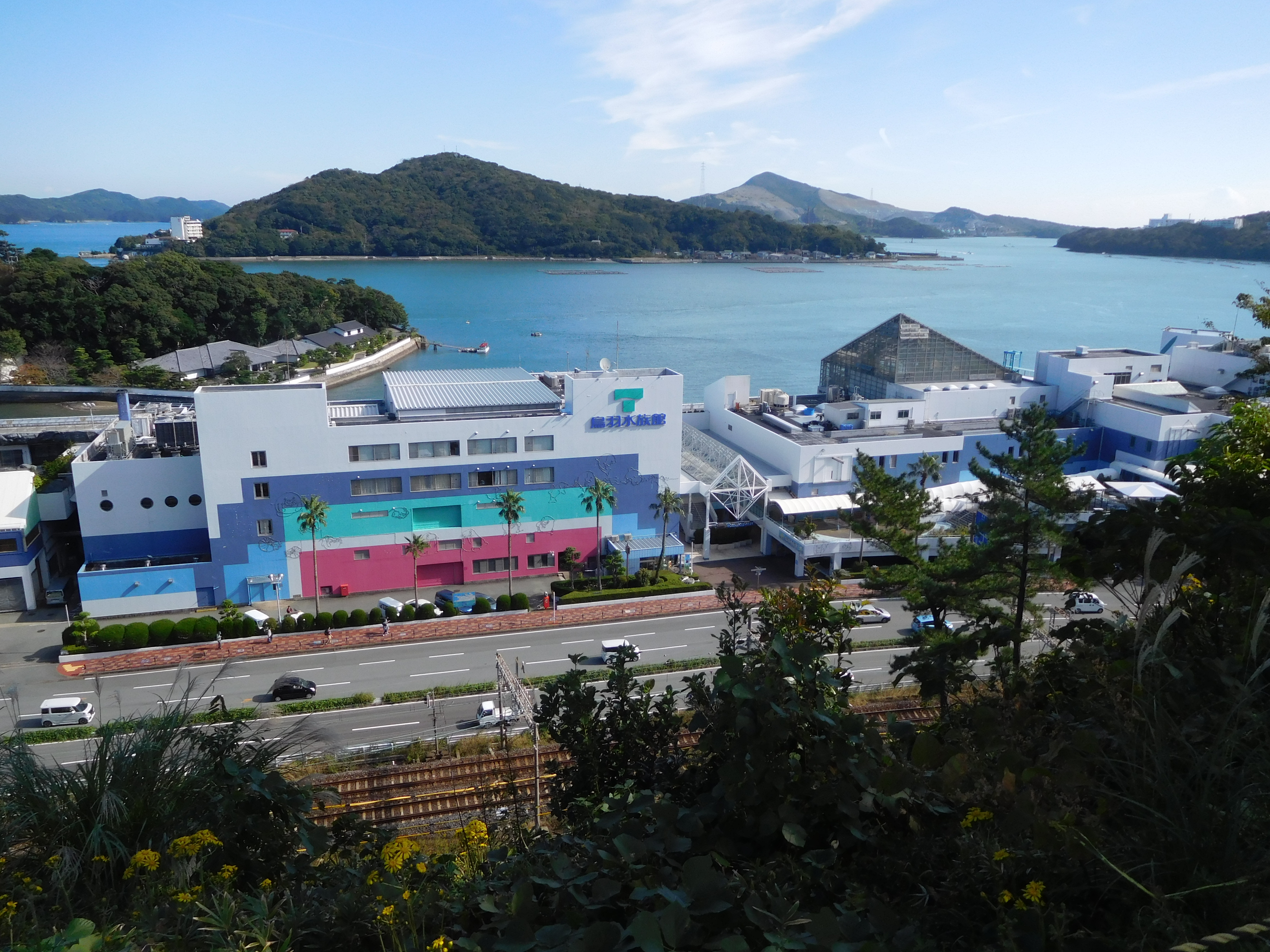
Entire aquarium facility

Toba Aquarium opened May 1955. It was founded by Haruaki Nakamura, now the honorary president.

The first aquarium was a "handmade aquarium" with a 200 tsubo pond divided into four sections and stocked with penguins, sea lions, sea bream, and yellowtail, etc. The aquarium was marketed as having a guide.

In 1956, the aquarium became the Toba Aquarium Corporation, and on January 31, 1958, it was designated as a private museum under the Museum Law.

The aquarium was originally west of its current site, but when it became too cramped, the current site, the former Toba factory of Shinko Denki, was acquired and the first phase of construction was completed on July 2, 1990. On April 1, 1996, the official website was launched and online shopping began.

On August 3, 2009, the number of visitors reached 55 million, a first in Japan. On March 8, 2010, the museum's 55th anniversary, the number of visitors reached 5,555,555, and on April 2, 2015, its 60th anniversary, the number reached 60 million.

== Research and conservation ==
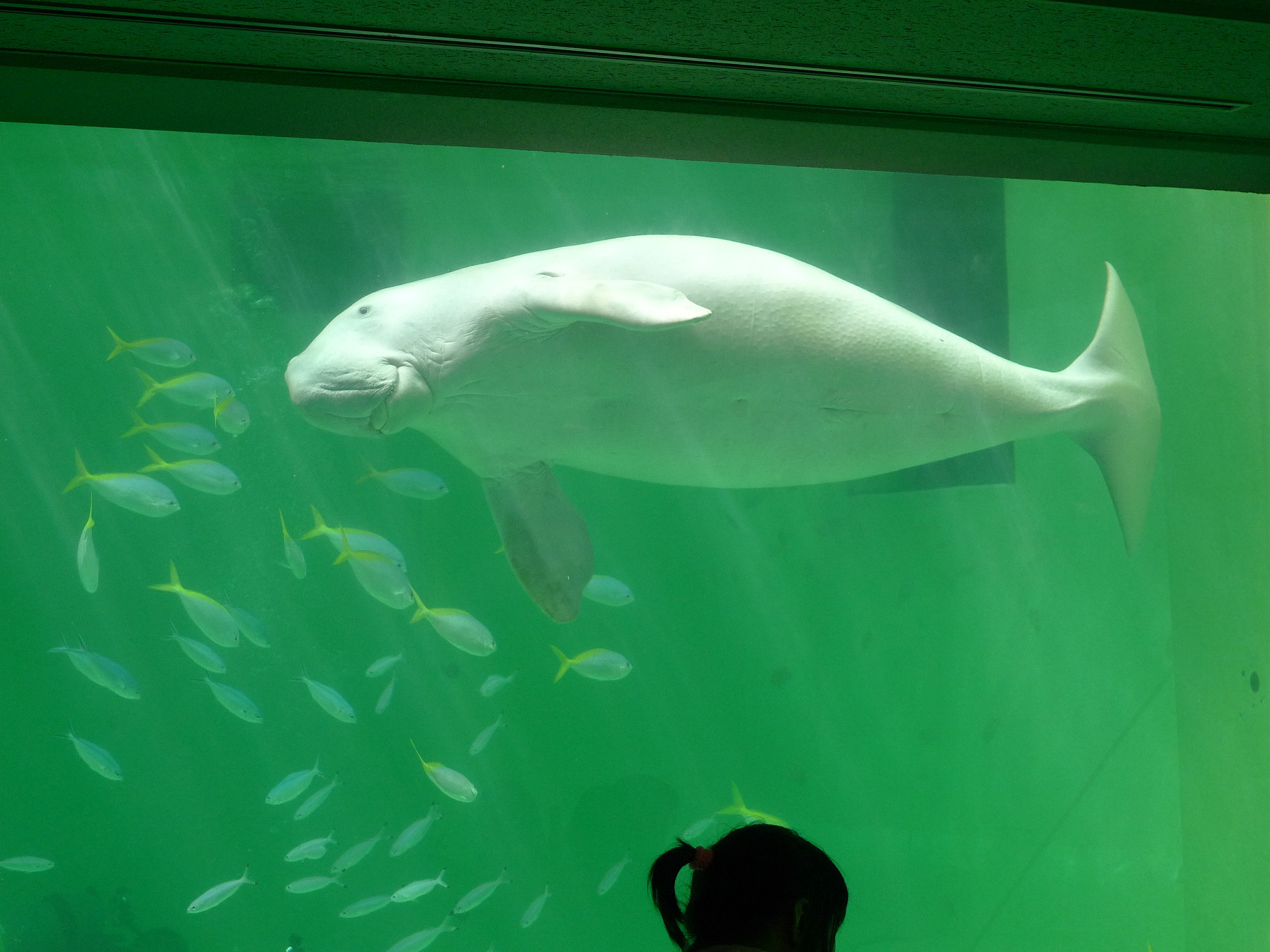
Serena the dugong was a gift from the Philippine government in 1987.

The museum also focuses on the protection and nurturing of rare marine life in danger of extinction; one example is the Baikal seal. Also, Toba Aquarium holds the world records for the birth of a baby snapping turtle and Japan's first second-generation sea otter, the world record for dugong breeding at 11,475 days (31 years and 5 months), and the world record for nautilus breeding. The male dugong Junichi, who had broken the world record, died on February 10, 2011 at the estimated age of 33.

Toba Aquarium has had 20 cases of Commerson's dolphin births in the past. Commerson's dolphin "Stella" has been in captivity for 22 years and gave birth on June 21, 2023 at 6:42 AM, her fifth case.

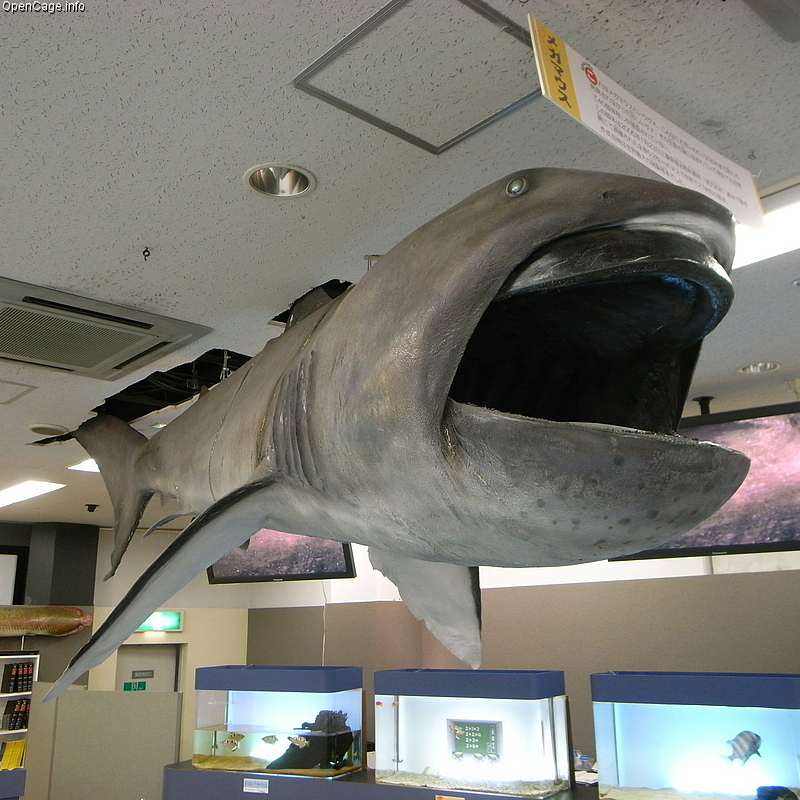
Taxidermy of Megamouth shark

Toba Aquarium is dedicated to the study of megamouth shark. Megamouths have been captured four times in the past off the coast of Mie Prefecture, and a stuffed specimen, measuring 5.2 meters in length, was landed off the coast of Mie in 2005. This specimen was dissected and put in formalin to study its feeding habits.

In 2011 and 2017, megamouth sharks were captured alive, and an official from the breeding and research department of the Toba Aquarium in Mie Prefecture said, "There are only 120 cases of discovery in the world and about 20 in Japan, so it is rare to see them alive." The shark was captured alive in 2017. The sharks were released because their large size made transportation to the aquarium difficult.

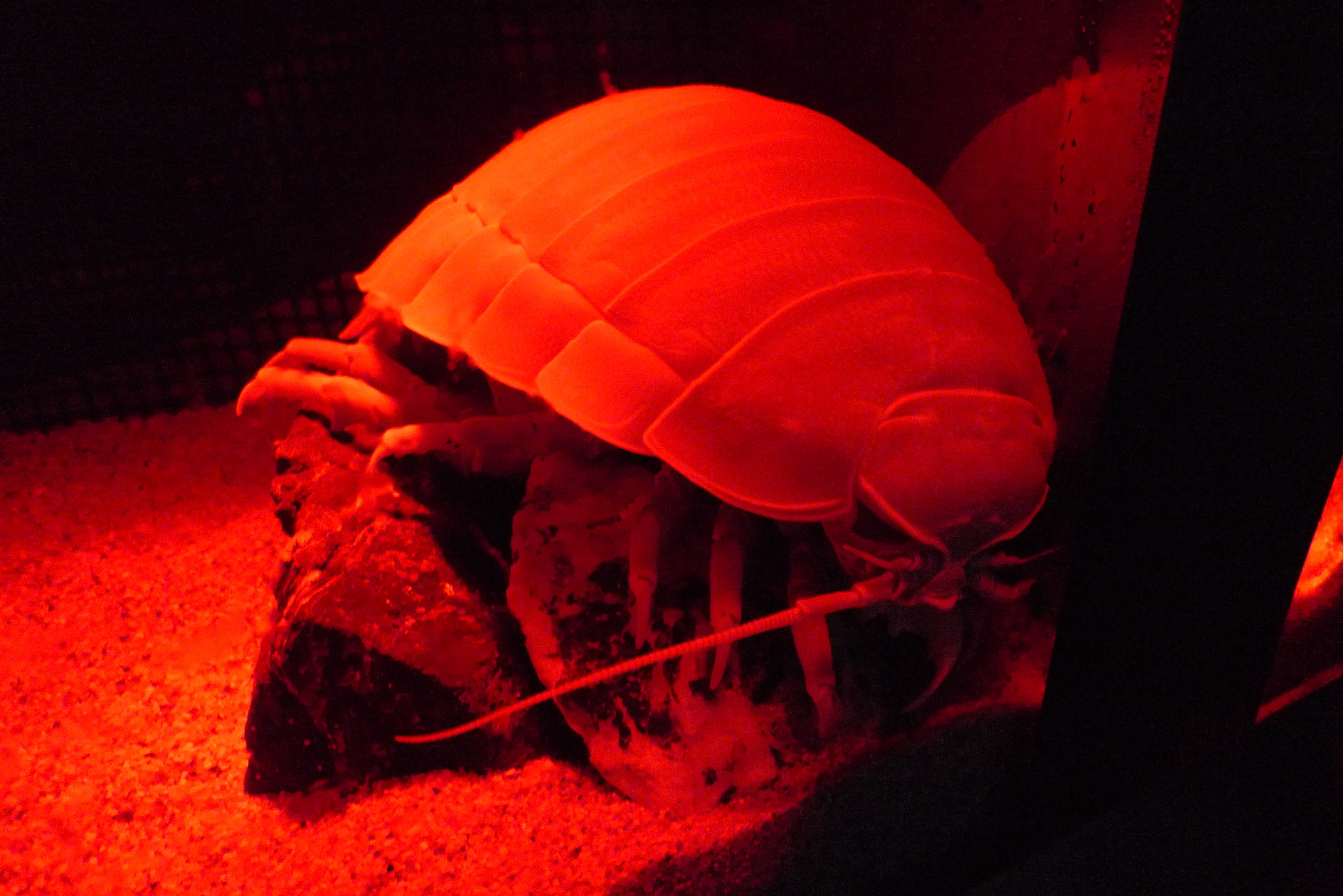
Bathynomus giganteus

=== Giant isopods at the Toba Aquarium ===
Toba Aquarium is also working on research on Bathynomus giganteus. In the past, Bathynomus giganteus "No. 1" fasted for an extended period of time and has not responded to monthly feeding since January 2, 2009, reaching its sixth year of fasting in January 2014. Although Bathynomus giganteus have always been resistant to starvation, there has never been a case of a Bathynomus giganteus fasting for such a long period of time, and a plan was made to broadcast niconico for a long time to show Bathynomus giganteus in a fasting state. However, on February 14, 2014, at around 5:00 p.m., when the keepers came to feed the animals in time for Valentine's Day, "No. 1" was confirmed dead.

On February 12, 2016, they were able to photograph and record the process of "No. 5" molting. The shell had been whitening and showing signs since the beginning of the year, and we were able to confirm that the molt had begun early in the morning of the 12th, and were able to photograph and record the process. The molt ended around 14:00 on the 12th. This was the first video footage of the molting process that could be recorded, at least in Japan.

In May 2020, a Bathynomus giganteus defecated for the first time in two years.

On February 18, 2014, a memorial program for Bathynomus giganteus No. 1, who fasted for a long period of time, was broadcast live on niconico, temporarily taking down the Toba Aquarium's server. A memorial program was also broadcast after the death of Bathynomus giganteus No. 9.

== Facilities ==
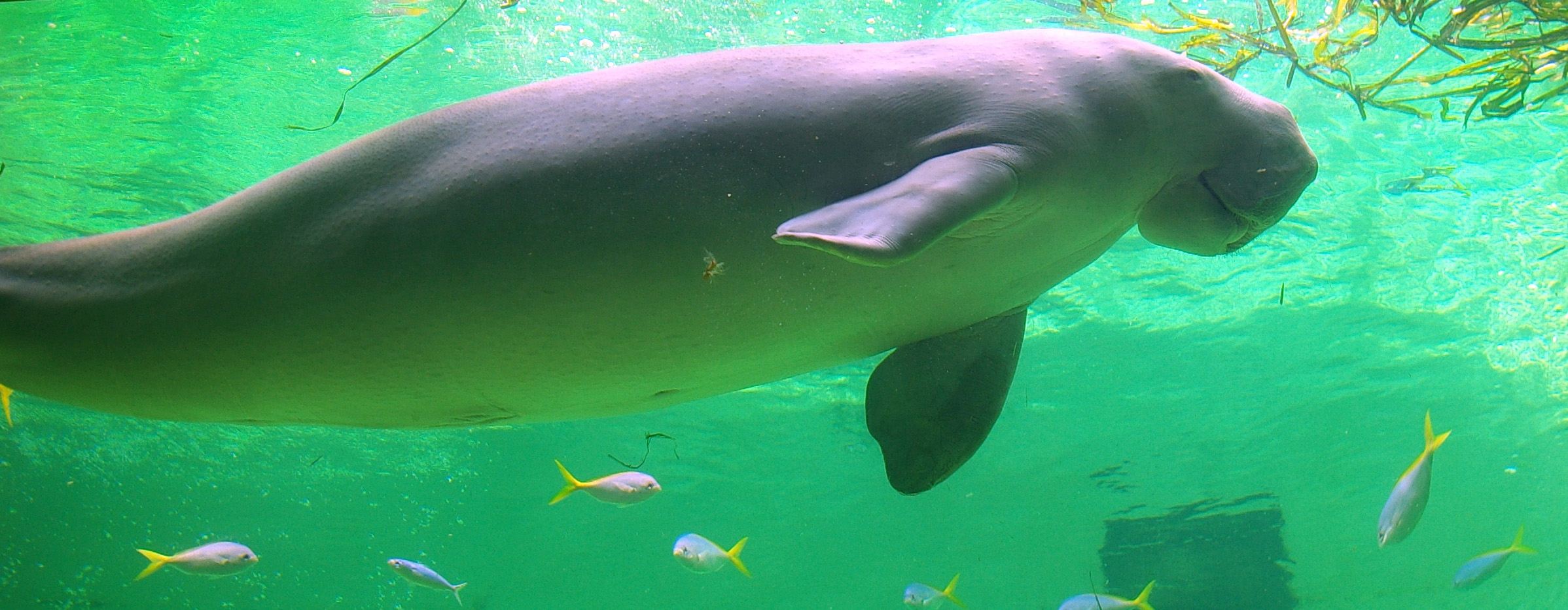
Dugong dugon

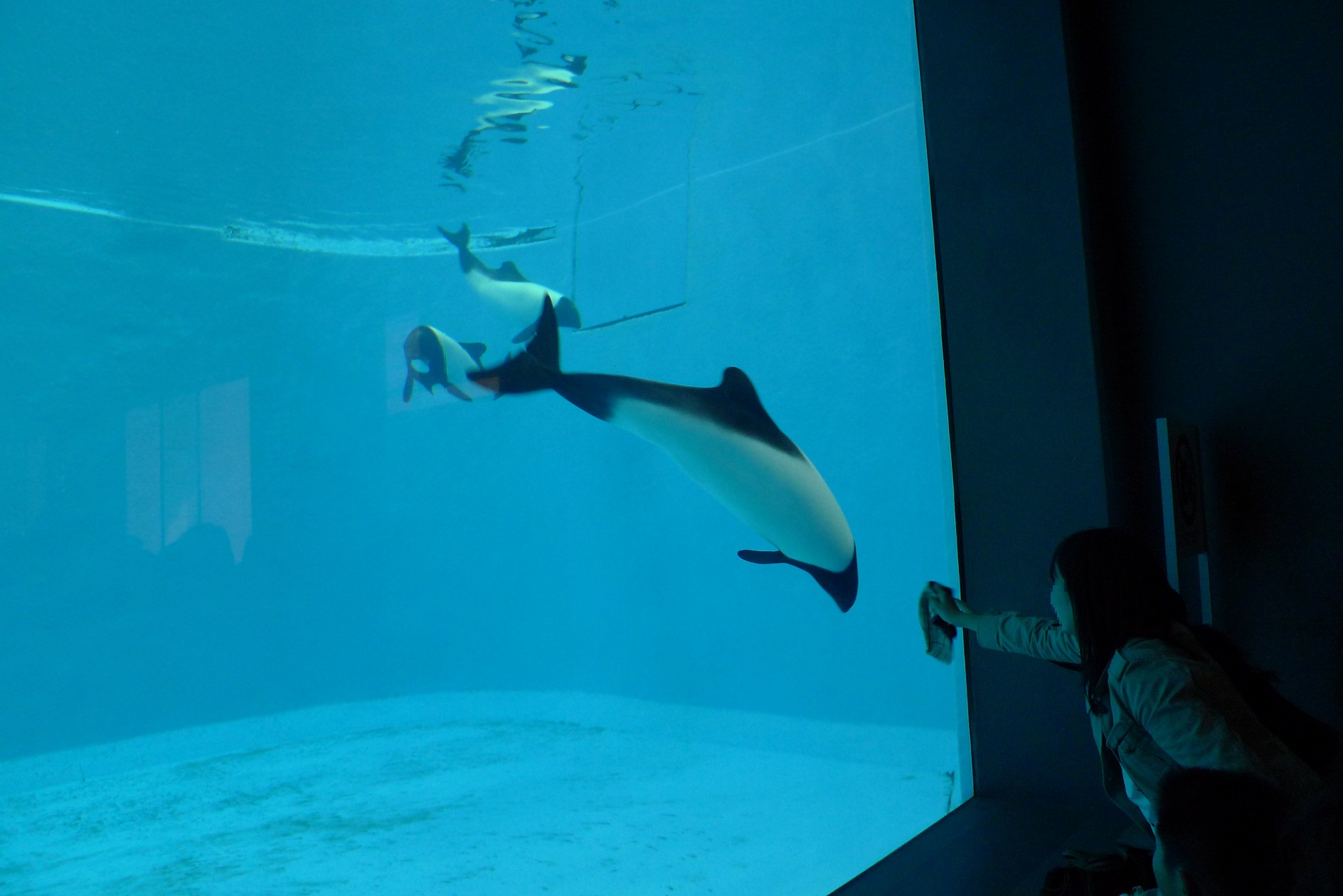
Commerson's dolphin

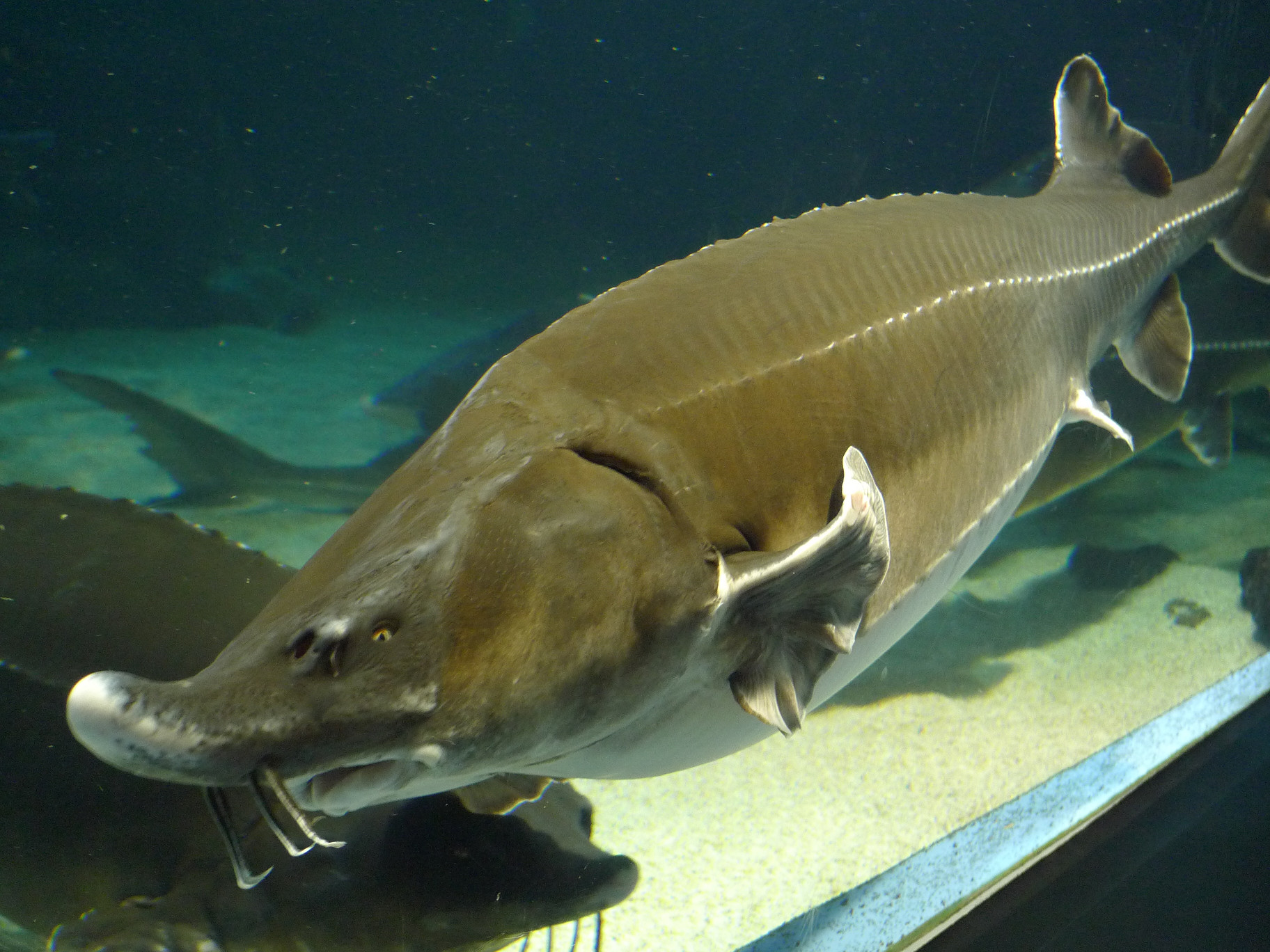
Bester sturgeon

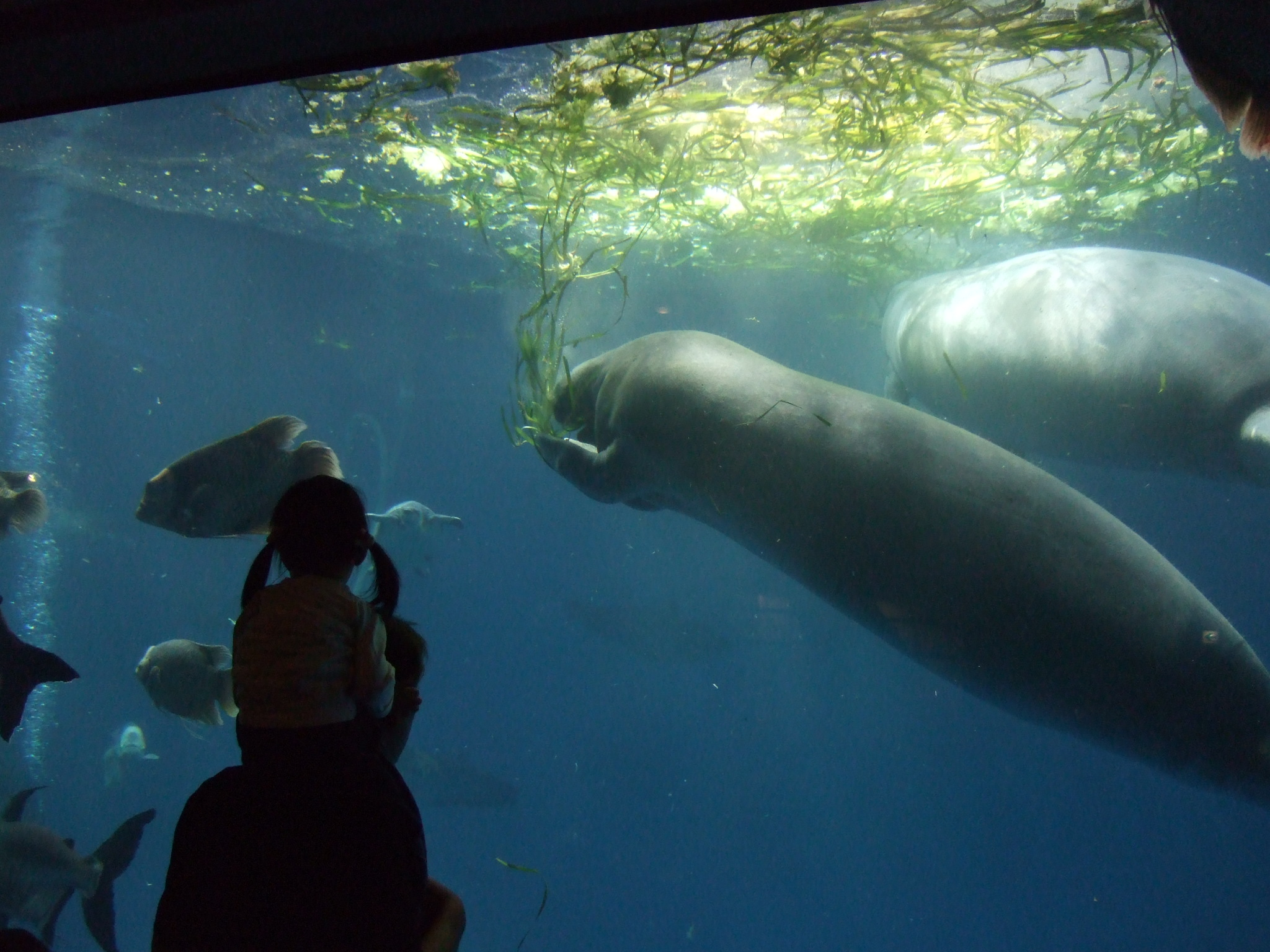
African manatee in Jungle World Tanks

The aquarium is divided into 12 main zones.

- Performance Stadium – featuring a sea lion show.
- Kingdom of Sea Animals – protection and breeding of marine mammals such as fur seals, earless seals, etc.
- Sea of Mermaid – featuring a dugong exhibit.
- Ancient Sea – an exhibit showcasing living fossils such as Tachypleus tridentatus, nautilus, lungfish, sand tiger, sturgeon and so on. There is also image exhibition of Coelacanths.
- Coral Reef Diving – the staff breeds tropical fish, sea turtles and corals.
- Sea of Ise-Shima, Japanese Sea – an exhibit featuring creatures which live in Ise Bay or the Japanese neighboring waters such as finless porpoises, crabs and moray eels.
- Rivers in Japan – creatures which live in rivers in Japan such as cherry salmon.
- Jungle World – creatures which live in Amazon River and its drainage basin's jungles. For instance, Arapaimas are included.
- Sea of Polar Regions – sea otters, Commerson's dolphins and Baikal seals.
- Corridor of water – Humboldt penguins, Oriental small-clawed otters, smooth-coated otters, walrus, pelicans and other animals are exhibited.
- Crayfish Corner – species of crayfish are exhibited.
- Special exhibition room.

== Underwater Induction Ceremony ==
Toba Aquarium holds an annual "Underwater Induction Ceremony" inside a large aquarium tank.

Initiated by a senior staff member of the aquarium, the ceremony will be held for the 13th time in 2019; in 2020, viewing will be limited to approximately 30 relatives of new employees and general visitors to prevent the spread of the epidemic of new coronavirus infection.

In the ceremony, the new employees (keepers), dressed in wet suits over their suits, enter the tank with cylinders on their backs, underwater glasses and fins on their feet, receive a waterproofed letter of appointment, and polish the glass of the tank underwater as their "first job". The ceremony is open to the public, and the new employees address the visitors underwater; one of the 2013 new employees commented after the ceremony, "I want to provide information that is not on Wikipedia."

== Gallery ==
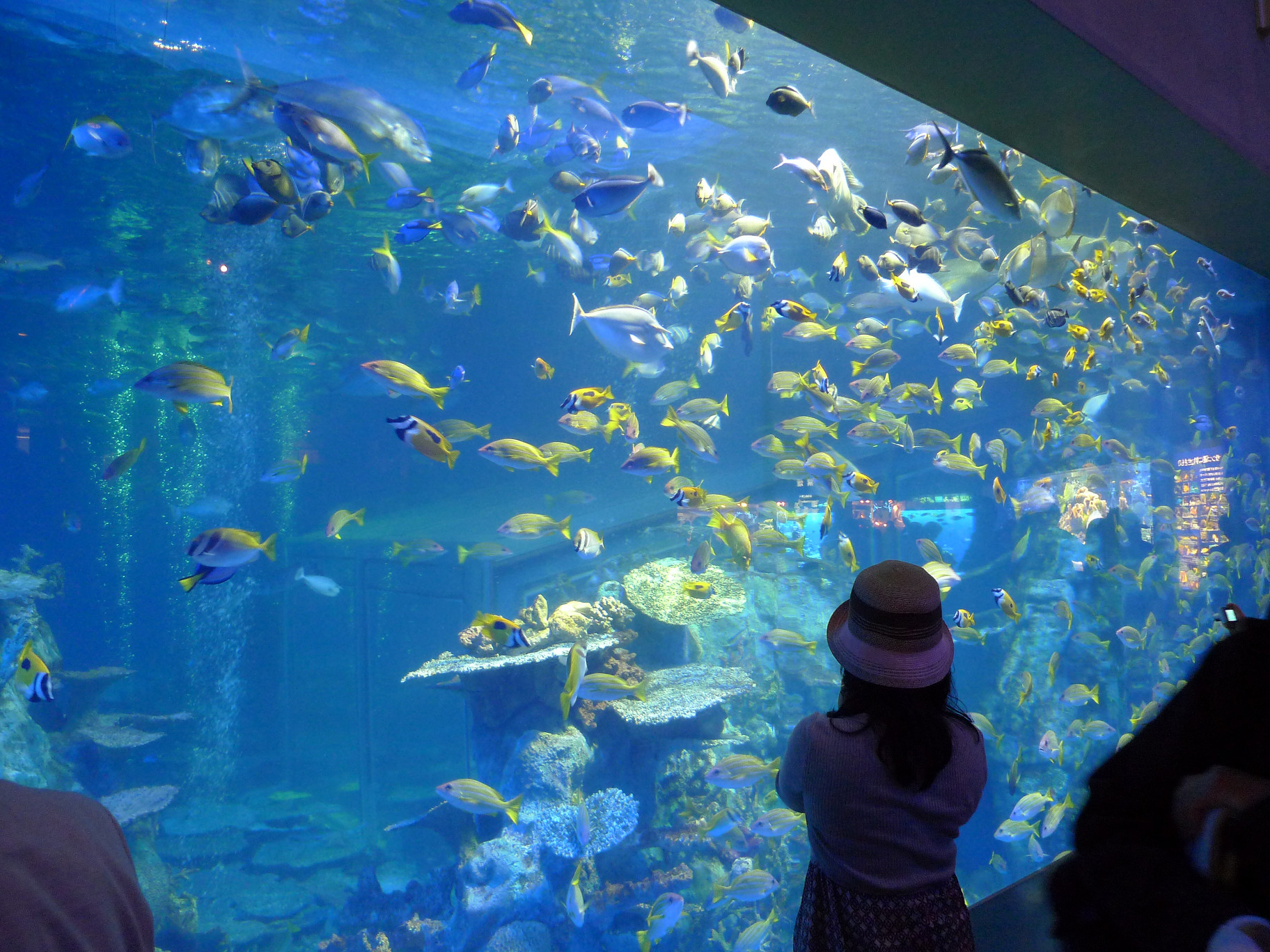

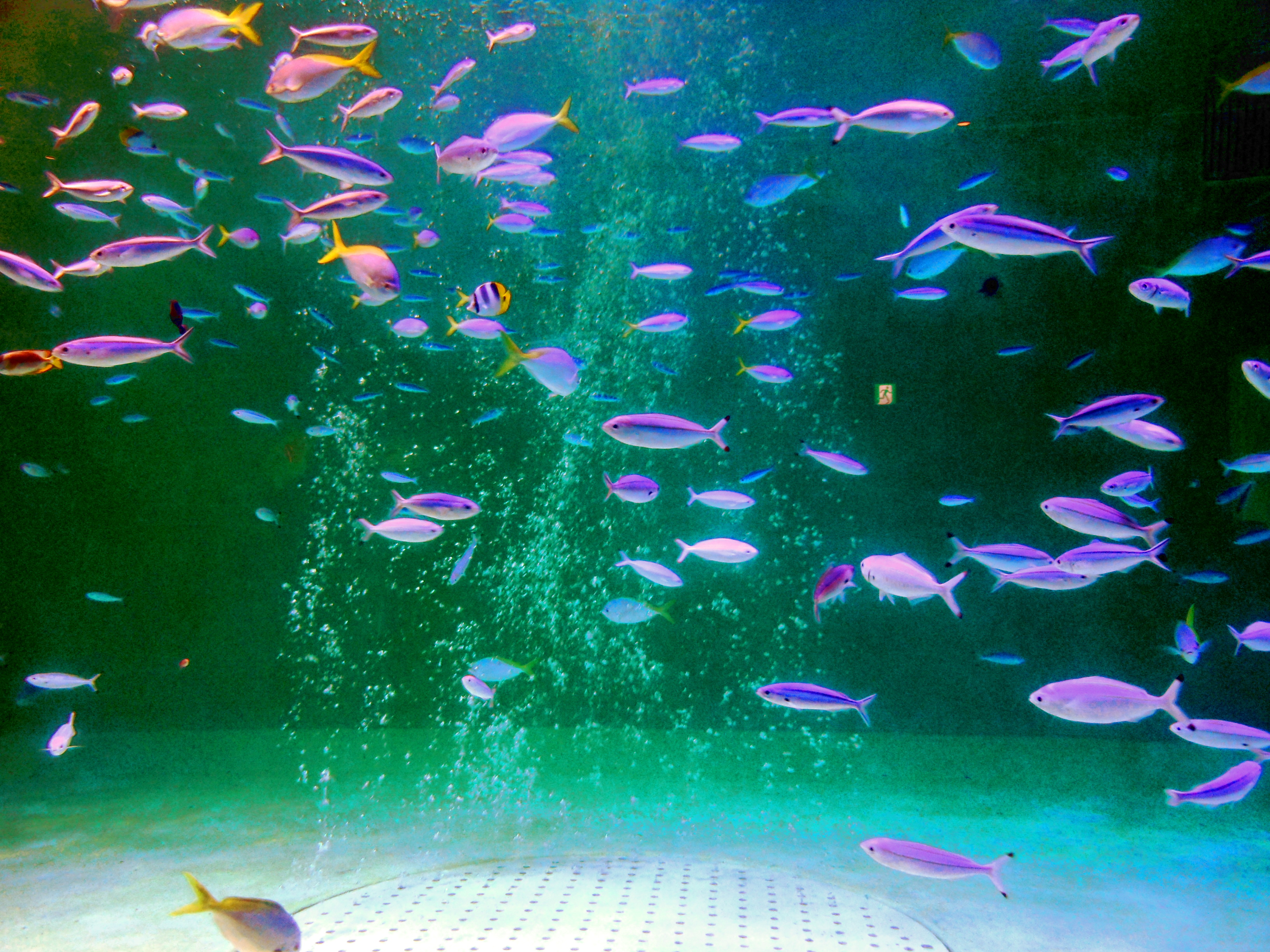

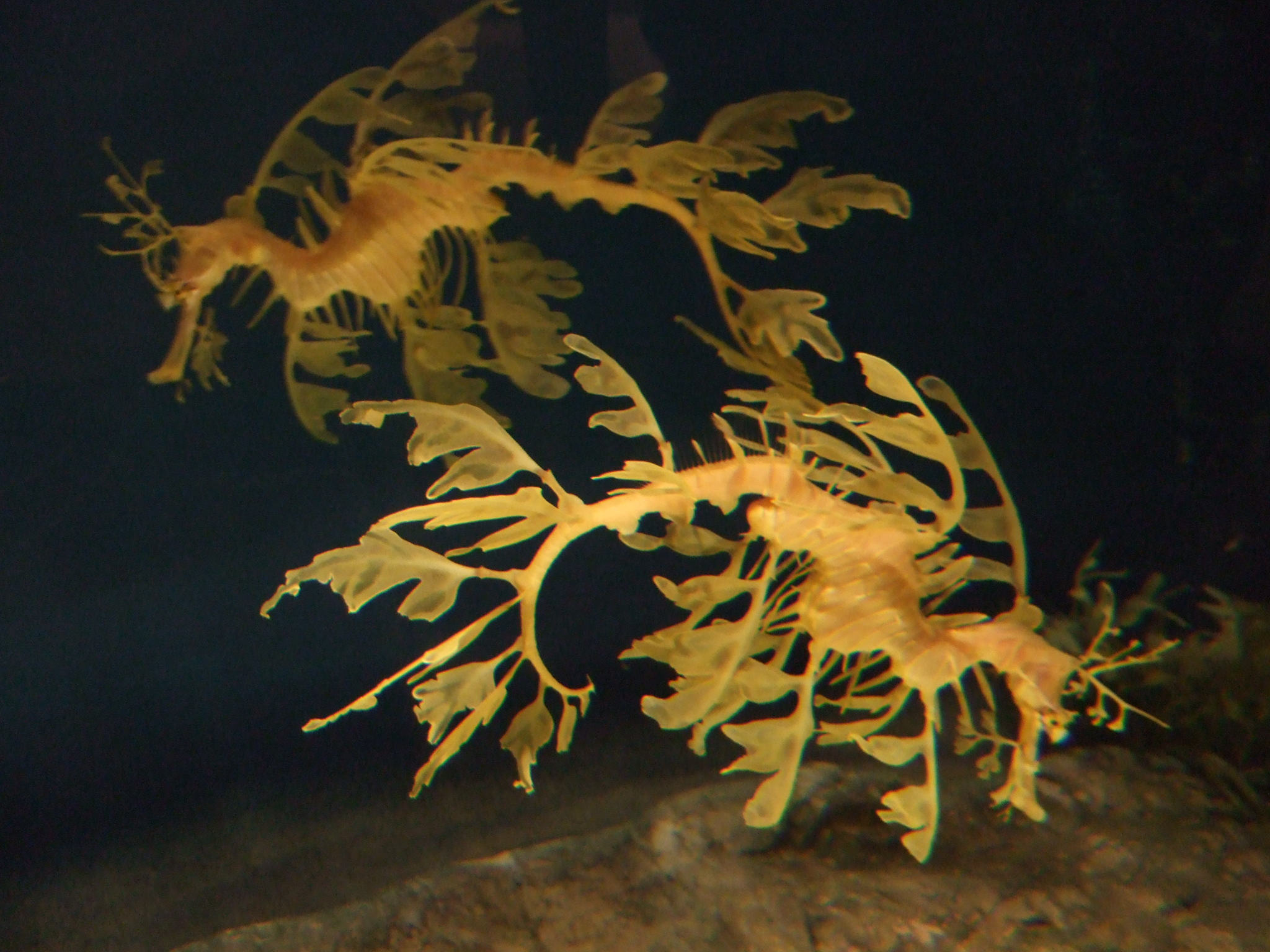

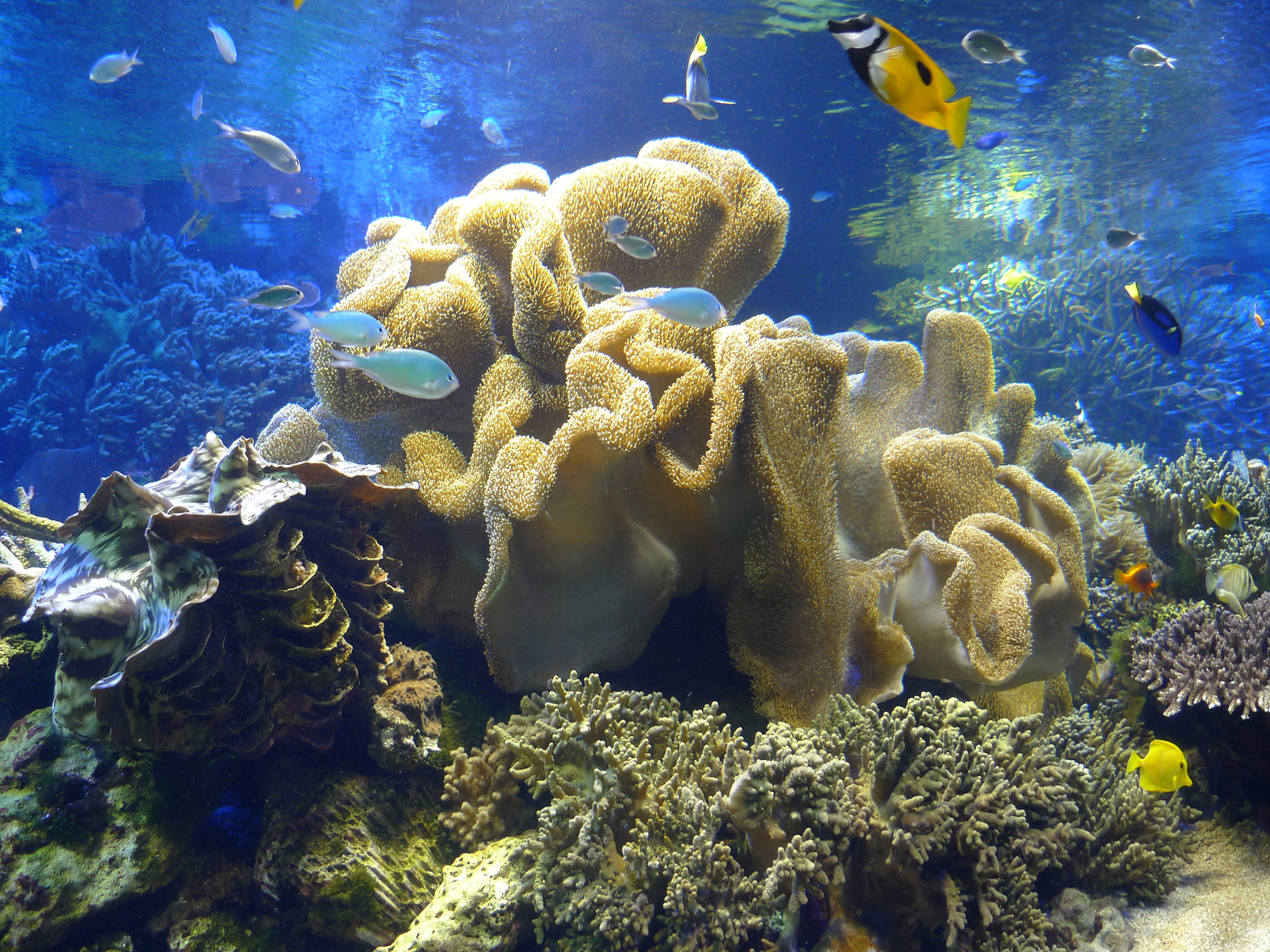

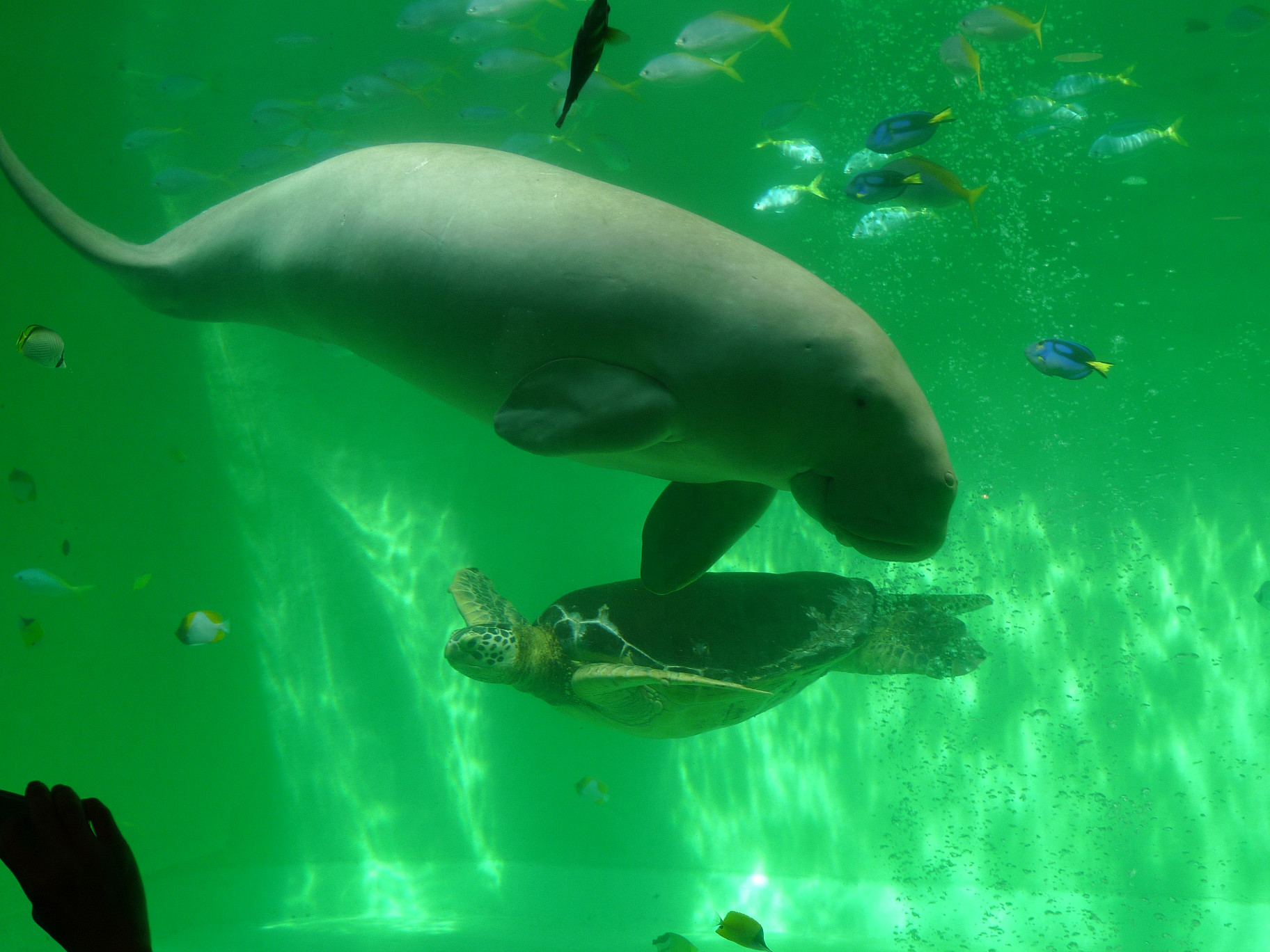

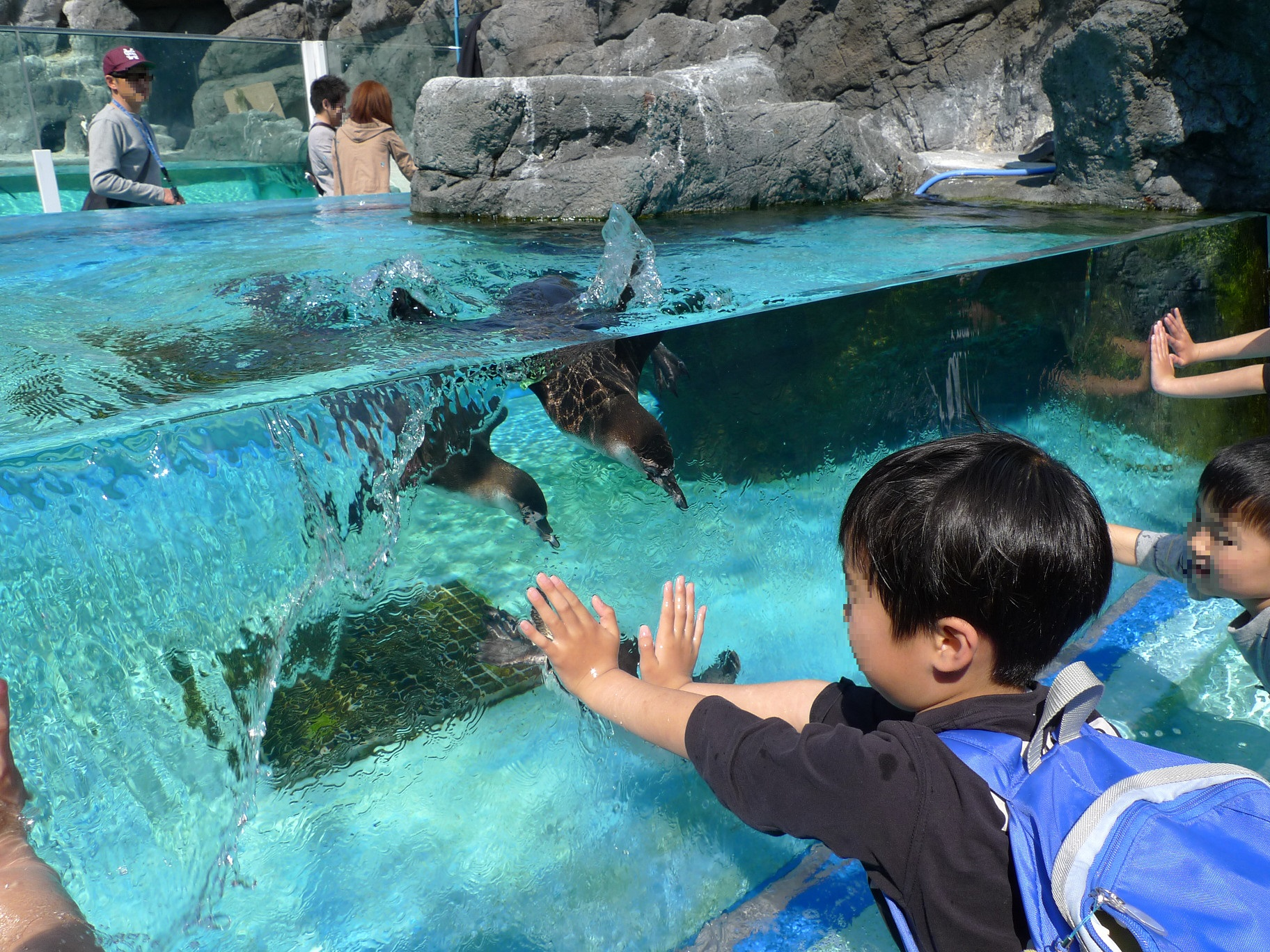

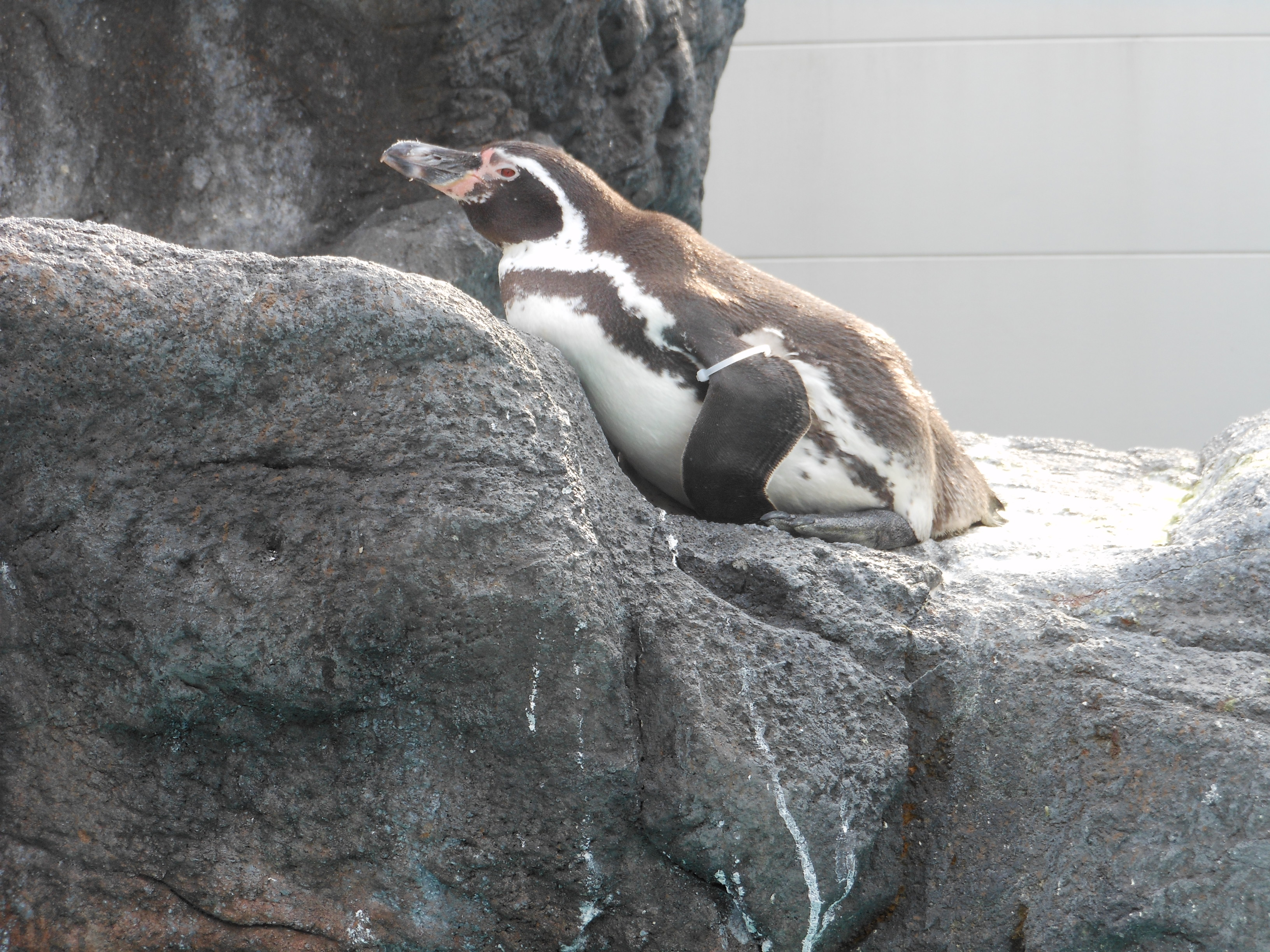

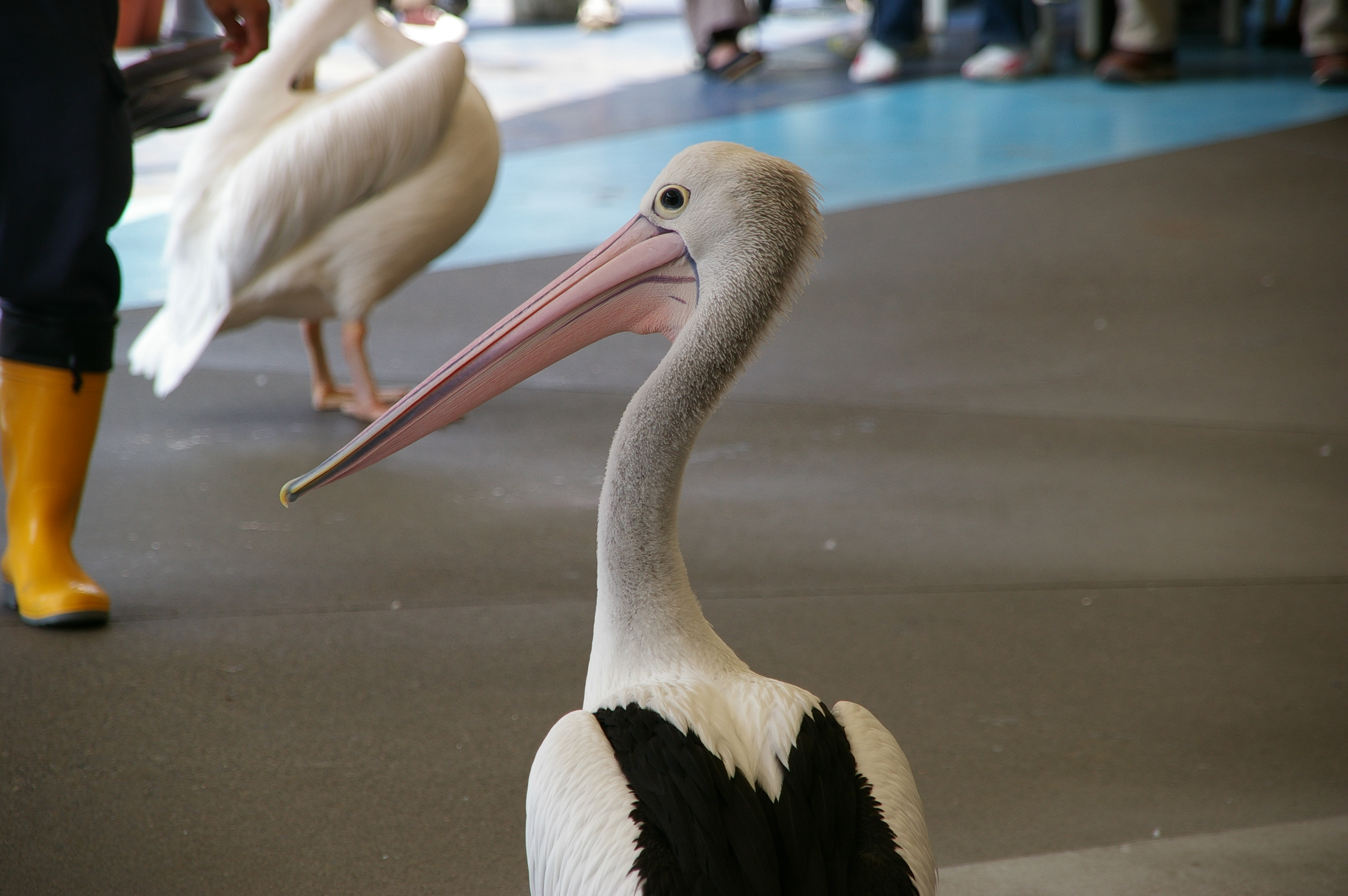

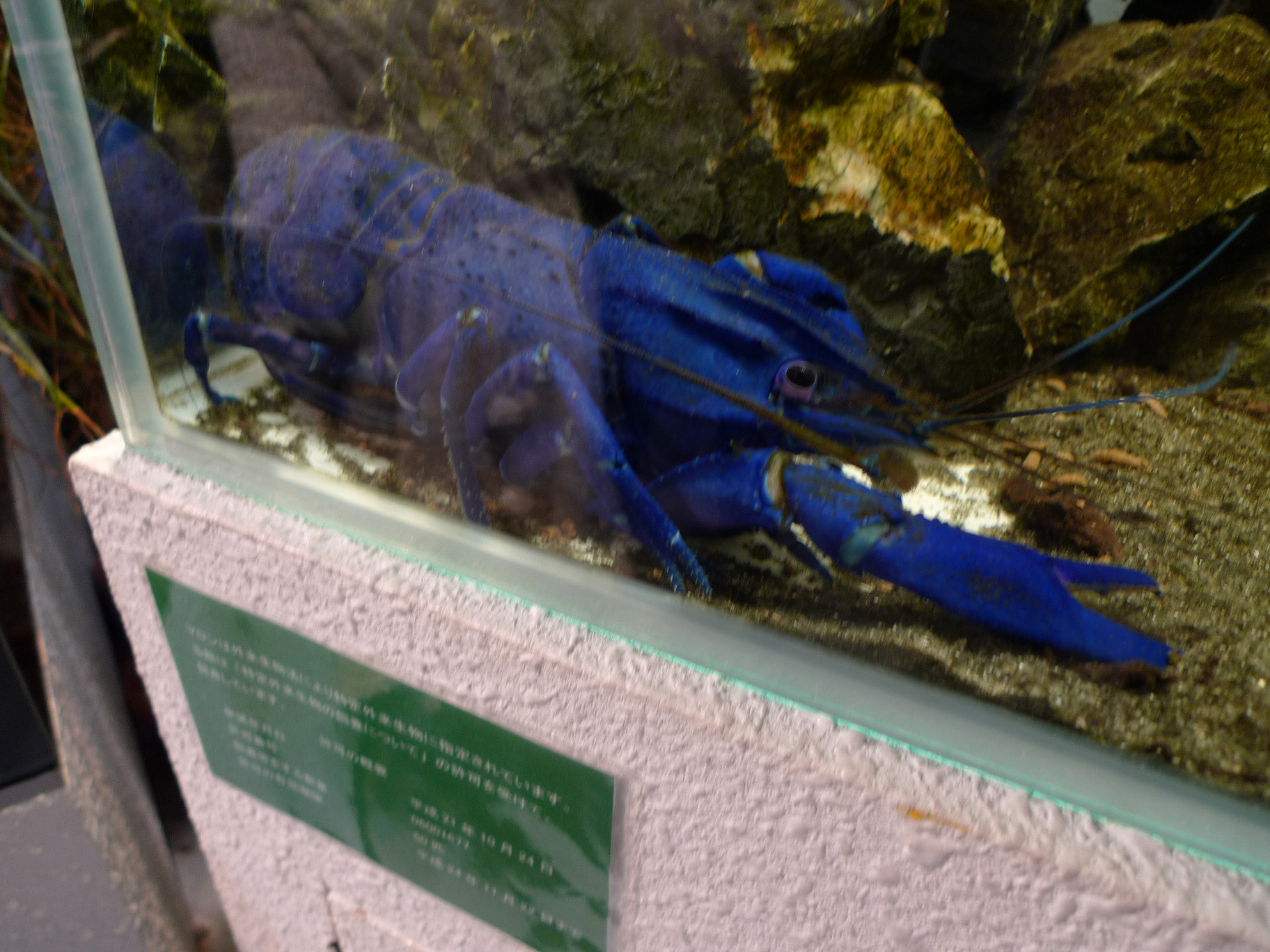

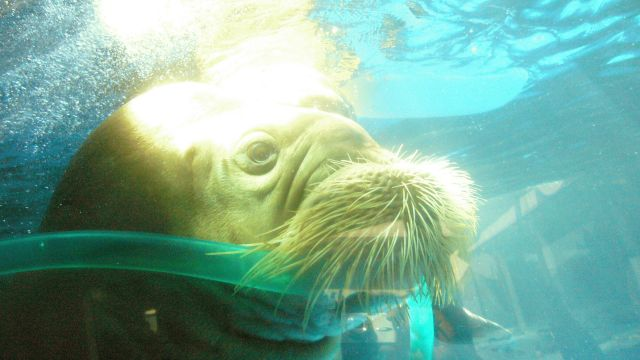

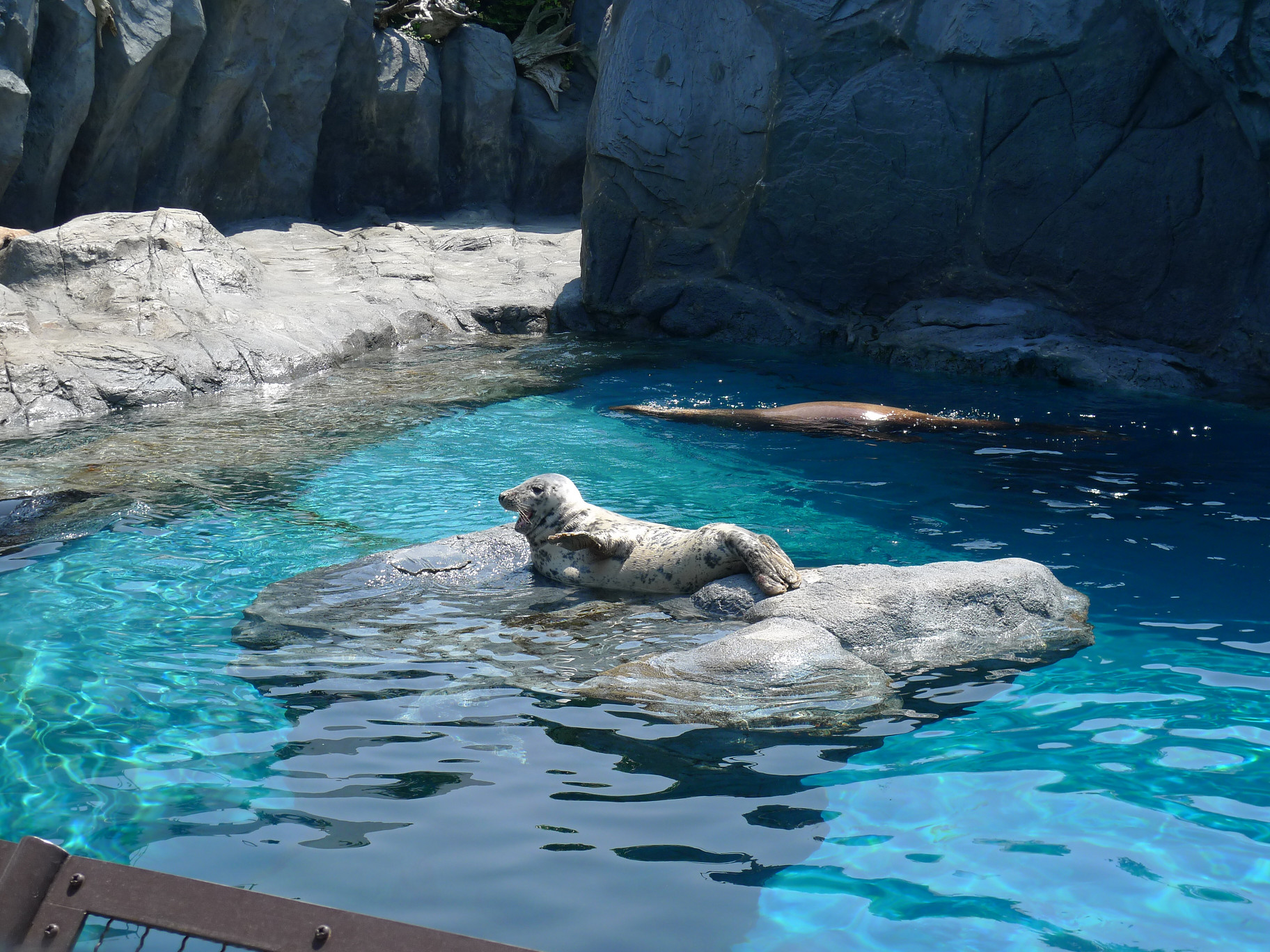

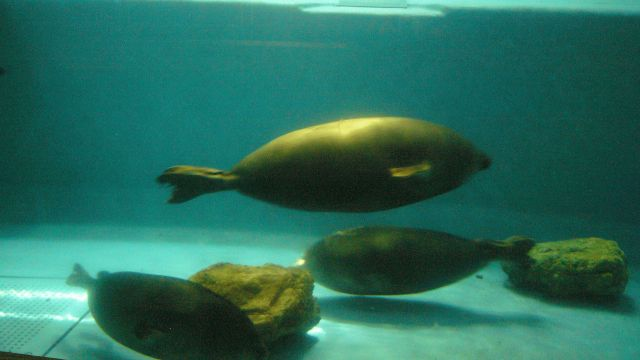

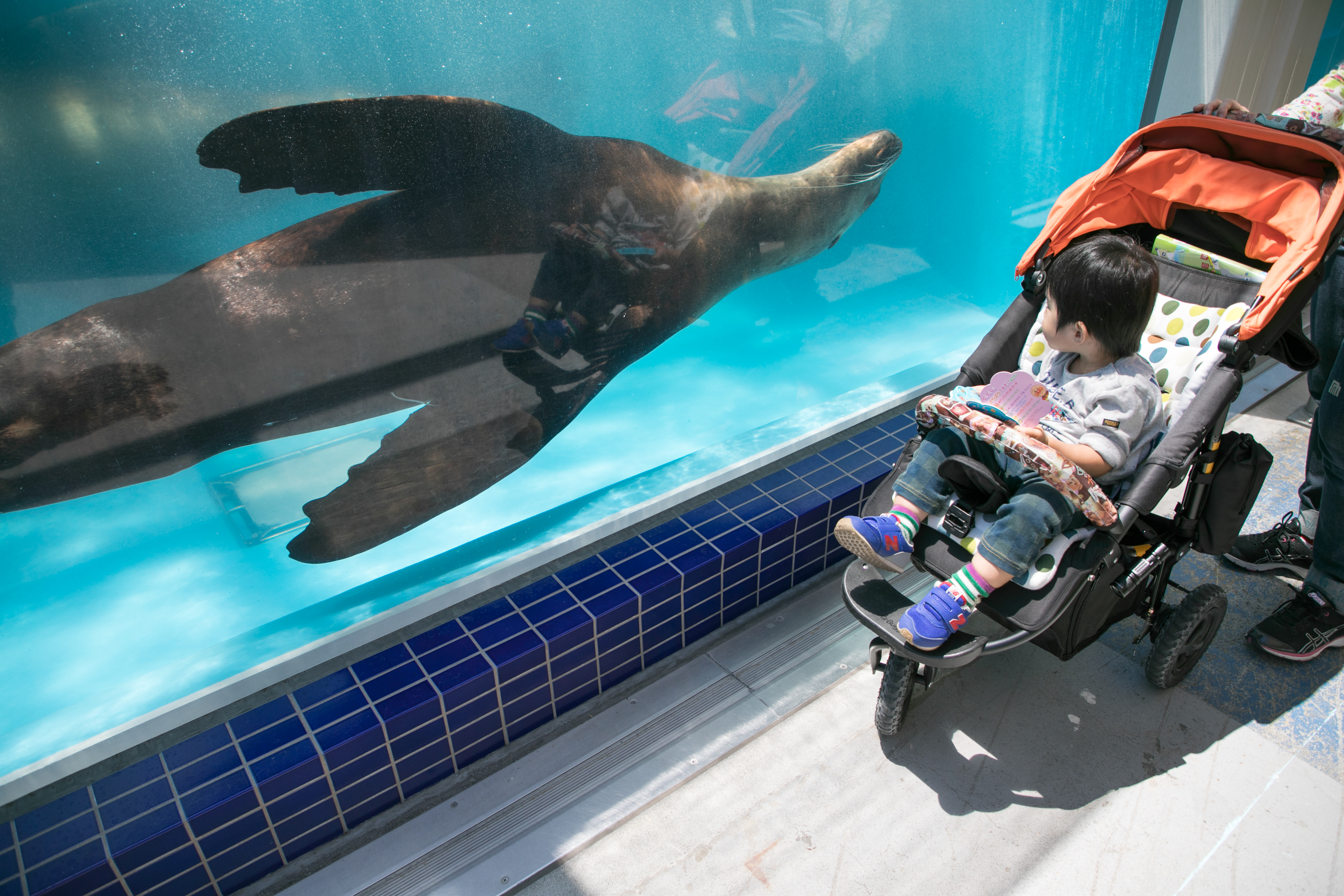

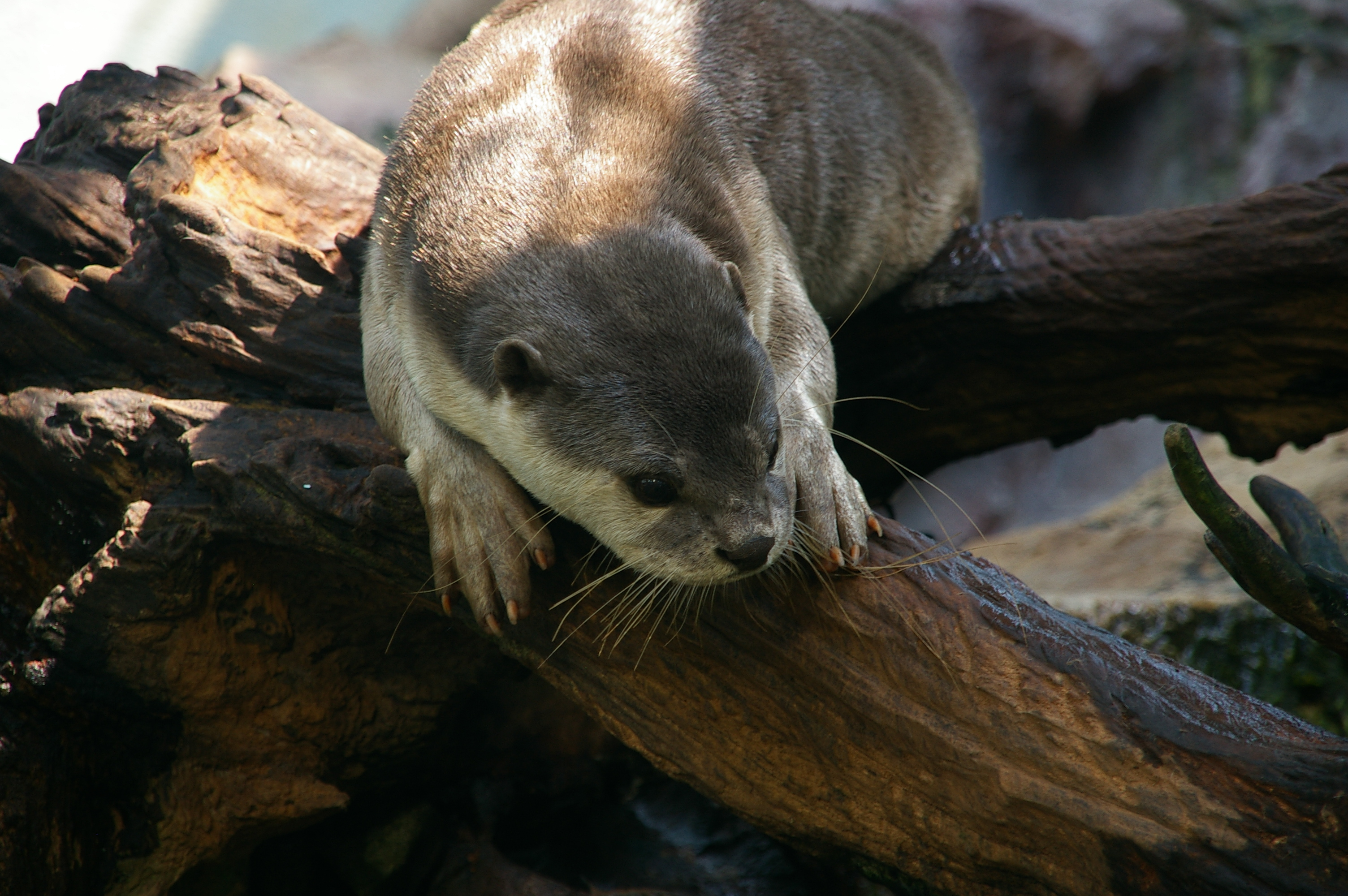

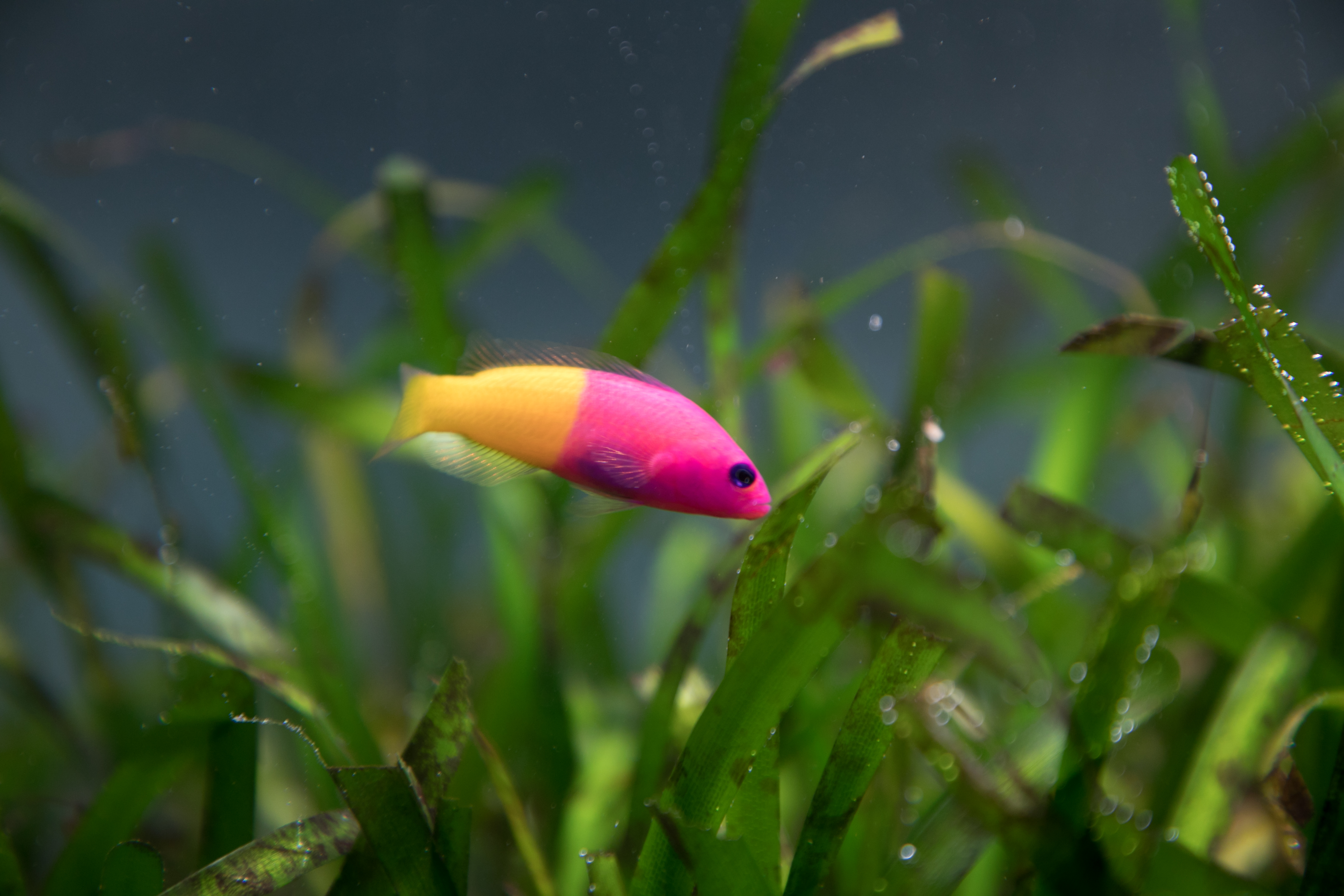

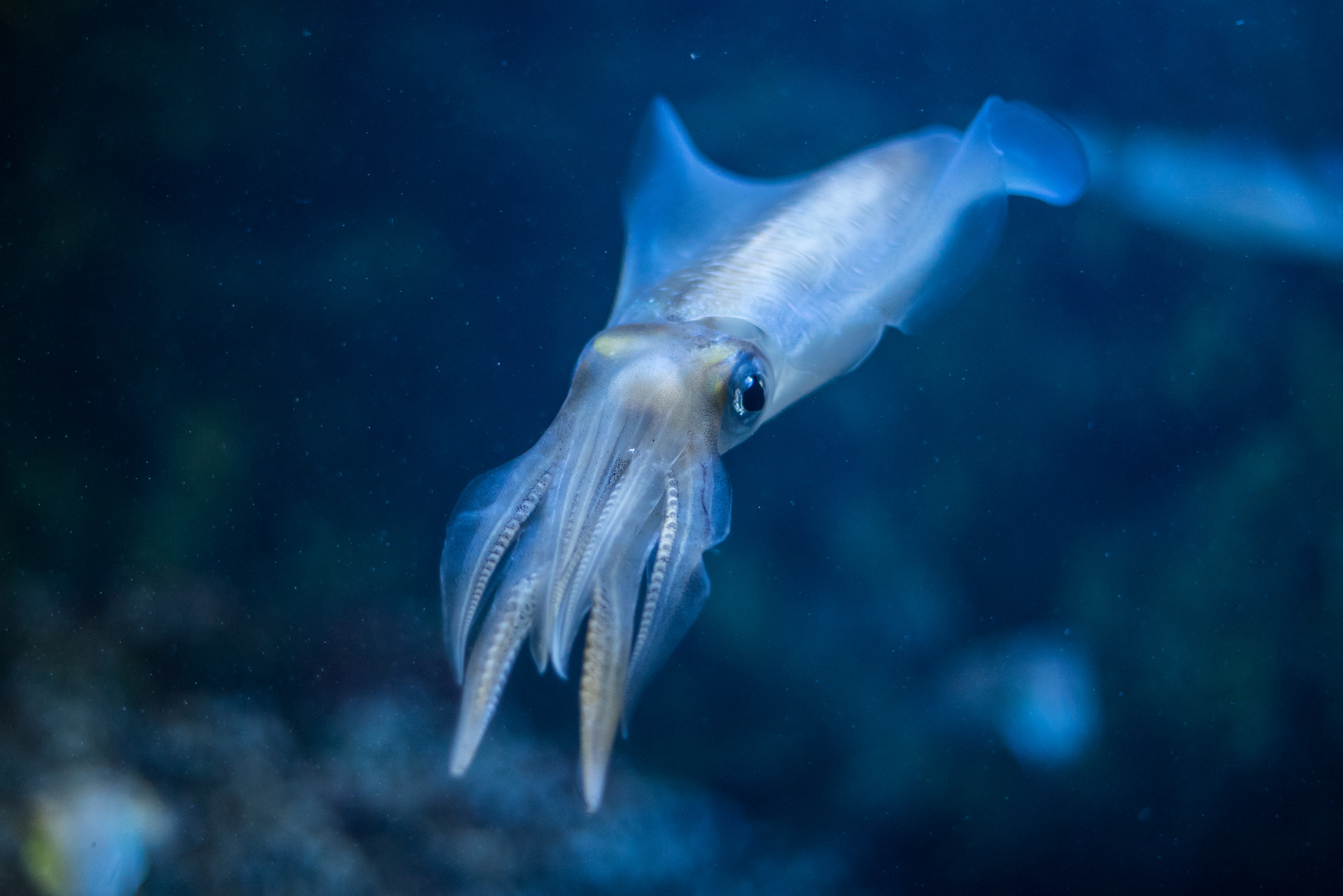
