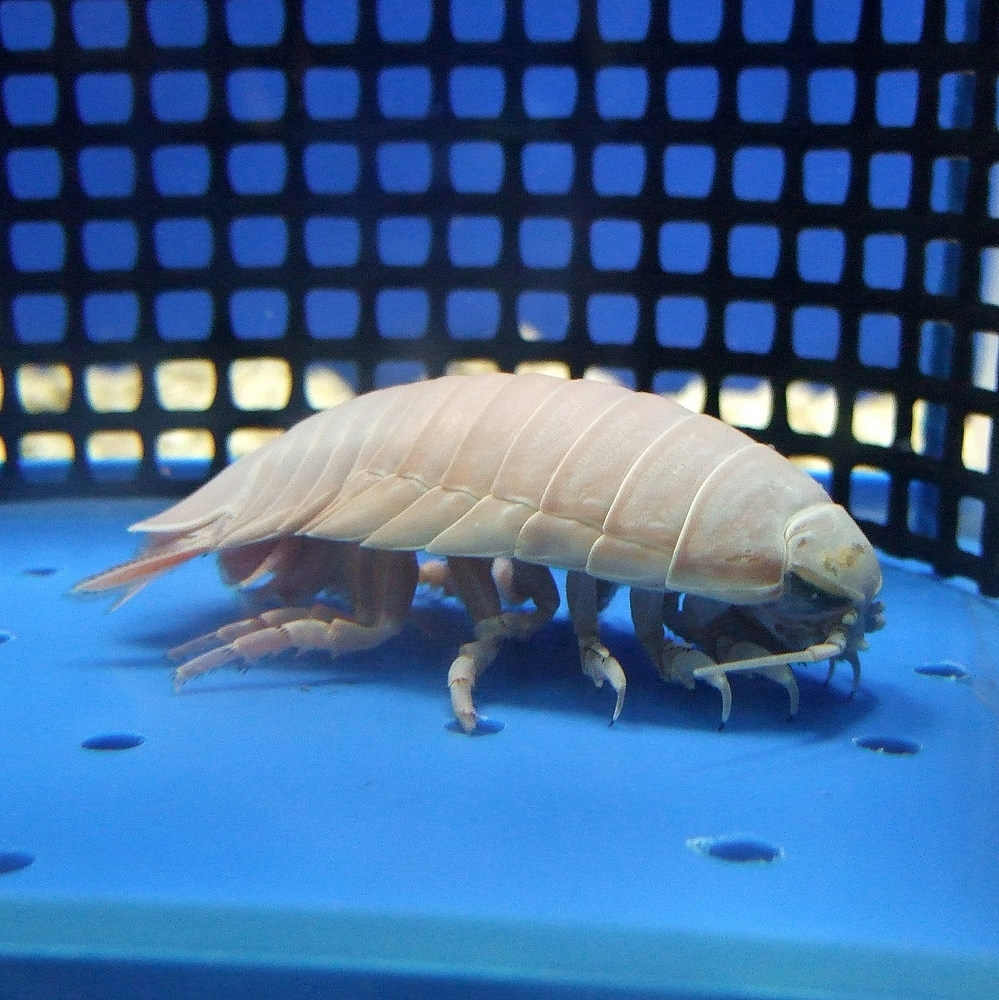

Scientific classification
- Kingdom: Animalia
- Phylum: Arthropoda
- Class: Malacostraca
- Order: Isopoda
- Family: Cirolanidae
- Genus: Bathynomus
- Species: B. doederleini

Binomial name
- Bathynomus doederleini Ortmann, 1894

Synonyms
- Bathynomus doederleinii Ortmann, 1894

= Bathynomus doederleini =

Species of crustacean

Bathynomus doederleini is a species of giant isopod within the family Cirolanidae. The species is found in waters 100 to 686 metres (330 to 2,250 ft) below sea level in the Western Central Pacific near Asian countries such as Japan, Taiwan, and the Philippines. From 1990 to 1992 baited traps were used of Taiwan at depths of 300 to 500 metres (980 to 1,640 ft) where seven collections of the isopods were made. Individuals measured from 28 to 138 millimetres (1.1 to 5.4 in) in length and varied on the season. Males were usually at lengths of 50 millimetres (2.0 in) whereas females usually measured at 88 millimetres (3.5 in).
