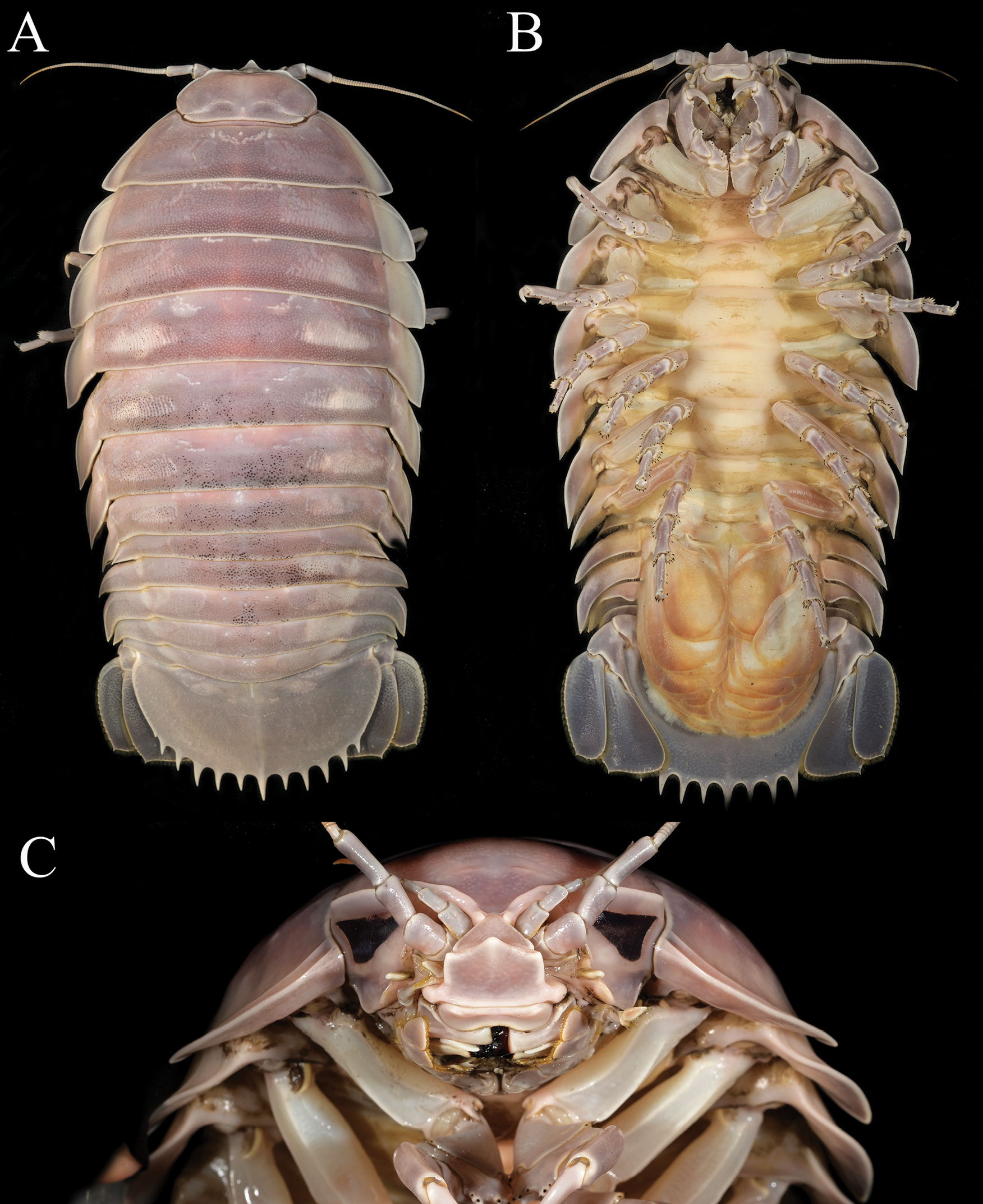
- Bathynomus vaderi paratype

Scientific classification
- Kingdom: Animalia
- Phylum: Arthropoda
- Clade: Pancrustacea
- Class: Malacostraca
- Order: Isopoda
- Family: Cirolanidae
- Genus: Bathynomus
- Species: B. vaderi

Binomial name
- Bathynomus vaderi Ng, Sidabalok & Nguyen, 2025

= Bathynomus vaderi =

Species of giant isopod

Bathynomus vaderi, also known as the Darth Vader giant isopod, is a species of giant isopod found in the South China Sea off the coast of Vietnam near the Spratly Islands. The species is named after the Star Wars character Darth Vader because of its facial structure resembling the character's helmet. The species was identified after researchers obtained numerous giant isopods from fishermen. Bathynomus vaderi can be up to 12.8 inches (0.325 m) in length and 2.2 pounds (0.997 kg) in weight, and is one of the largest known species of isopods. The species is predicted to have a similar habitat to another giant isopod species, Bathynomus jamesi.

== See also ==
- List of organisms named after the Star Wars series
