= Bathynomus affinis =

Scientific classification
- Kingdom: Animalia
- Phylum: Arthropoda
- Class: Malacostraca
- Order: Isopoda
- Family: Cirolanidae
- Genus: Bathynomus
- Species: B. affinis

Binomial name
- Bathynomus affinis Richardson, 1910

Species of crustacean

Bathynomus affinis is a species of aquatic crustacean of the order Isopoda. It is known from the West Pacific (Philippines). There are minimal records of this isopod, all of them come from the early 1900s.
