= Bathynomus decemspinosus =

Scientific classification
- Kingdom: Animalia
- Phylum: Arthropoda
- Class: Malacostraca
- Order: Isopoda
- Family: Cirolanidae
- Genus: Bathynomus
- Species: B. decemspinosus

Binomial name
- Bathynomus decemspinosus Shih, 1972

Species of crustacean

Bathynomus decemspinosus is a species of aquatic crustacean of the order Isopoda. It is known from the West Pacific (Taiwan) and has been found dwelling in coastal waters of the Indian Ocean.
