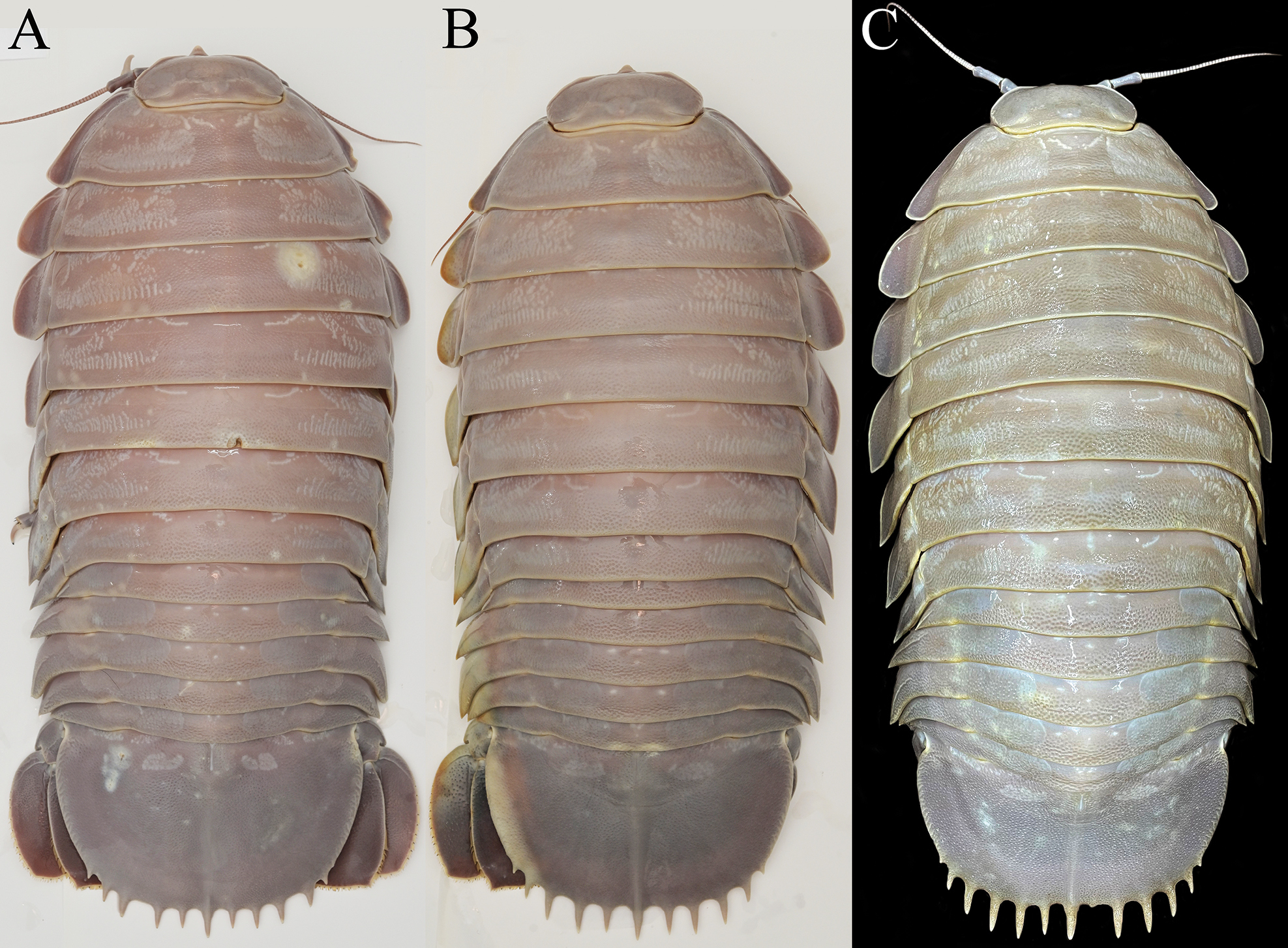
- Bathynomus jamesi isopods viewed from above

Scientific classification
- Kingdom: Animalia
- Phylum: Arthropoda
- Clade: Pancrustacea
- Class: Malacostraca
- Order: Isopoda
- Family: Cirolanidae
- Genus: Bathynomus
- Species: B. jamesi

Binomial name
- Bathynomus jamesi Kou, Chen, & Li, 2017

= Bathynomus jamesi =

Species of deep-sea giant isopod

Bathynomus jamesi is a species of deep-sea giant isopod. It was first found and described in 2017 in the northern waters of Hainan Island in the South China Sea.

== Physical characteristics ==
One of the largest known isopod species, Bathynomus jamesi often reaches over 20cm long and weighs up to 2.6kg. It has a hard, segmented exoskeleton and can roll into a ball for protection.

== Habitat and diet ==
Bathynomus jamesi typically lives at depths ranging from roughly 300 to 2,600 meters, found in the West Pacific and Northwest Indian Ocean, including the South China Sea and near Hainan Island. The species operates as a deep-sea scavenger, feeding primarily on the carcasses of marine animals that sink to the dark ocean floor. It can survive more than five years without eating.

== Genetics ==
Bathynomus jamesi has the largest sequenced crustacean genome, 5.89 Gb.

The reason Bathynomus jamesi can survive over half a decade without eating is due to an inherited bacterial gene called ND1, which helps slow down their metabolism in cold deep-sea temperatures, allowing them to live off stored lipids and fat reserves.
