= Bathynomus immanis =

Scientific classification
- Kingdom: Animalia
- Phylum: Arthropoda
- Clade: Pancrustacea
- Class: Malacostraca
- Order: Isopoda
- Family: Cirolanidae
- Genus: Bathynomus
- Species: B. immanis

Binomial name
- Bathynomus immanis Bruce, 1986

Species of deep-sea giant isopod of the Indo-West Pacific

Bathynomus immanis is a deep-sea crustacean species that lives in the deep waters of the Indo-West Pacific, specifically along the eastern coast of Australia. It was first described in 1986. The specific epithet "immanis" is derived from the Latin word meaning huge or frightful. It is distinguished from other species of the Bathynomus genus by its slender shape and specific features on its tail shield, or pleotelson.

== Physical characteristics ==
Bathynomus immanis is a benthic crustacean related to land-dwelling pillbugs, but scaled up due to deep-sea gigantism. They have seven spines and a median longitudinal ridge on their posterior shield, or pleotelson. Like all giant isopods, it possesses a segmented, dorsoventrally flattened exoskeleton, large compound eyes, two pairs of antennae, and seven pairs of walking legs, also known as pereopods, equipped with hooked claws for gripping the sea floor.

== Habitat and diet ==
Bathynomus immanis lives in the Indo-West Pacific, specifically the Coral Sea off eastern Australia and extending to places like Astrolabe Bay and the Bismarck Sea near Papua New Guinea. They live at a depth of about 260 to 540 meters, with higher concentrations often observed between 300 and 400 meters deep. Bathynomus immanis is a bathyal creature inhabiting the cold, pitch-black deep ocean floor where it acts as an opportunistic scavenger feeding on marine snow and large animal carcasses.
