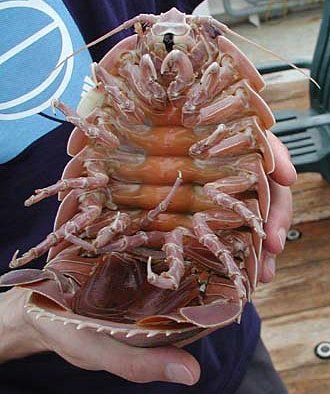
- The underside of Bathynomus giganteus

Scientific classification
- Kingdom: Animalia
- Phylum: Arthropoda
- Class: Malacostraca
- Order: Isopoda
- Family: Cirolanidae
- Genus: Bathynomus
- Species: B. giganteus

Binomial name
- Bathynomus giganteus A. Milne-Edwards, 1879

= Bathynomus giganteus =

Bathynomus giganteus Temporal range: Holocene to recent
- Bathynomus giganteus at a depth of c. 800 m

Species of crustacean

Bathynomus giganteus is a species of aquatic crustacean, of the order Isopoda. It is a member of the giant isopods (Bathynomus), and as such it is related—albeit distantly—to shrimps and crabs. It was the first Bathynomus species ever documented and was described in 1879 by French zoologist Alphonse Milne Edwards after the isopod was found in fishermen's nets off the coast of the Dry Tortugas in the Gulf of Mexico.

The Bathynomus genus is benthic and abundant in cold waters with a depth of 310–2140 m in the West-Atlantic, including the Gulf of Mexico and the Caribbean. It was the first species of Bathynomus to be described and historically it was reported from other oceans, but these are now recognized as other closely related species. The unusually large size of Bathynomus has been attributed to an effect called deep-sea gigantism, where invertebrates living in cold deep waters tend to grow larger and have longer lifespans.

== Physical description ==
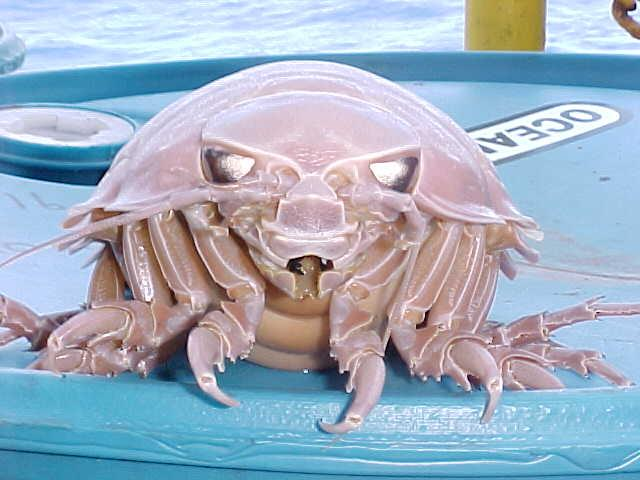
A frontal view of Bathynomus giganteus, showing its large, highly reflective compound eyes

Like most crustaceans, the body of Bathynomus giganteus is divided into three distinct regions; a head (cephalon), a thorax, and an abdomen (pleon). They have large triangular compound eyes that are spaced very far apart and have over 4000 individual facets. When light bounces off a highly-reflective layer called the tapetum lucidum at the back of their eyes, it makes them appear to glow. B. giganteus reaches a typical length between 19 and 36 cm an individual claimed to be 76 cm long has been reported by the popular press, but the largest confirmed was ca. 50 cm.

== Reproduction ==
Bathynomus reproduce via egg-laying. Mature females develop a pouch known as a marsupium, where the eggs are stored until the young are ready to emerge as miniatures of the adults, known as manca, completely bypassing a larval stage. Mancae can reach lengths up to 60 mm and are characterized by their lack of the seventh pair of pereiopods. The reproductive anatomy of Bathynomus giganteus resembles that of other isopods. The females of B. giganteus, while being so many times larger than females of other isopods, carries approximately the same number of eggs in its marsupium. The eggs, however, show an increase in size which appears to be almost proportional to the increase in body size. The reproductive organs of the males also resemble those of the males of smaller isopod species.

== Ecology ==
As scavengers, Bathynomus giganteus plays a crucial role in the deep-sea ecosystem. They feed on the remains of dead marine organisms that sink to the ocean floor, helping to recycle nutrients back into the ecosystem. This scavenging behavior is vital for maintaining the balance of deep-sea communities.

== Aquaculture ==
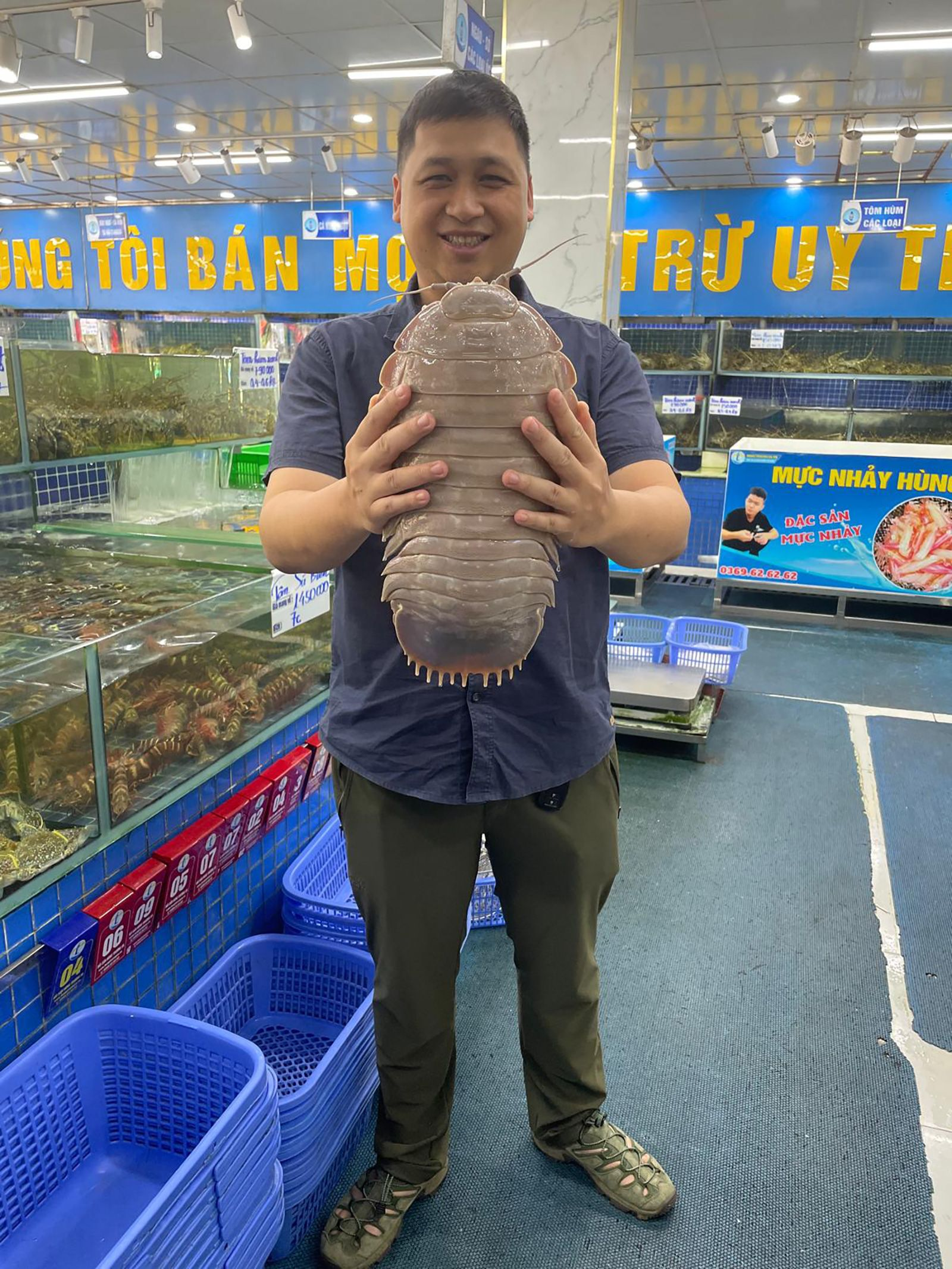
2.62kg specimen found in Hanoi

Giant isopods are not usually fished commercially. However, other Bathynomus species can be found in the occasional oceanside restaurant in northern Taiwan, where they are boiled and typically served with rice.
