= Arubolana aruboides =

Conservation status
- Critically Endangered (IUCN 3.1)

Scientific classification
- Kingdom: Animalia
- Phylum: Arthropoda
- Clade: Pancrustacea
- Class: Malacostraca
- Order: Isopoda
- Family: Cirolanidae
- Genus: Arubolana
- Species: A. aruboides

Binomial name
- Arubolana aruboides (Bowman & Iliffe, 1983)

Synonyms
- Bermudalana aruboides Bowman & Iliffe, 1983

Species of crustacean

Arubolana aruboides is a species of crustacean in the family Cirolanidae. It is endemic to subterranean anchialine lakes in the Church and Wonderland caves on the island of Bermuda in the North Atlantic Ocean. It is classified as being critically endangered by the IUCN.

== Taxonomy ==
Arubolana aruboides was formally described in 1983 by Thomas Bowman and Thomas Iliffe as Bermudalana aruboides based on a male specimen collected from the Church Cave on Bermuda. Bowman and Iliffe erected the genus Bermudalana in the same paper describing the species to accommodate it, acknowledging that although they had tentatively placed the species in its own genus, it may be better placed in the closely-related Arubolana. The name of the former genus was an amalgamation of Bermuda and Cirolana, another genus of subterranean isopods. The specific epithet is meant to allude to the species' close relationship to Arubolana.

In 1984, Jos Notenboom transferred aruboides into the genus Arubolana, with the analysis of adult specimens of A. imula allowing him to conclude that the genus Bermudalana should be synonymised.

== Distribution and conservation ==
Arubolana aruboides is endemic to the British overseas territory of Bermuda in the North Atlantic Ocean. It is found in subterranean anchialine lakes in the Church and Wonderland caves on the island. It seems to be an free-swimming predator.

A 1996 assessment of the crustacean's conservation status by the IUCN classified it as being critically endangered.
