= Aatolana springthorpei =

Scientific classification
- Kingdom: Animalia
- Phylum: Arthropoda
- Class: Malacostraca
- Order: Isopoda
- Family: Cirolanidae
- Genus: Aatolana
- Species: A. springthorpei

Binomial name
- Aatolana springthorpei Keable, 1998

Species of crustacean

Holotype site: off Fitzroy Reef, QLD'"`UNIQ--ref-00000006-QINU`"'

Aatolana springthorpei is a species of crustaceans in the family Cirolanidae, first described by Stephen John Keable in 1998.

It is a benthic shrimp found in tropical waters at depths of 200 m to 203 m on the continental shelves of Queensland and New South Wales. Like other species in this genus it is a scavenger. The males are similar to the females, and the species is most similar to A. rapax.
