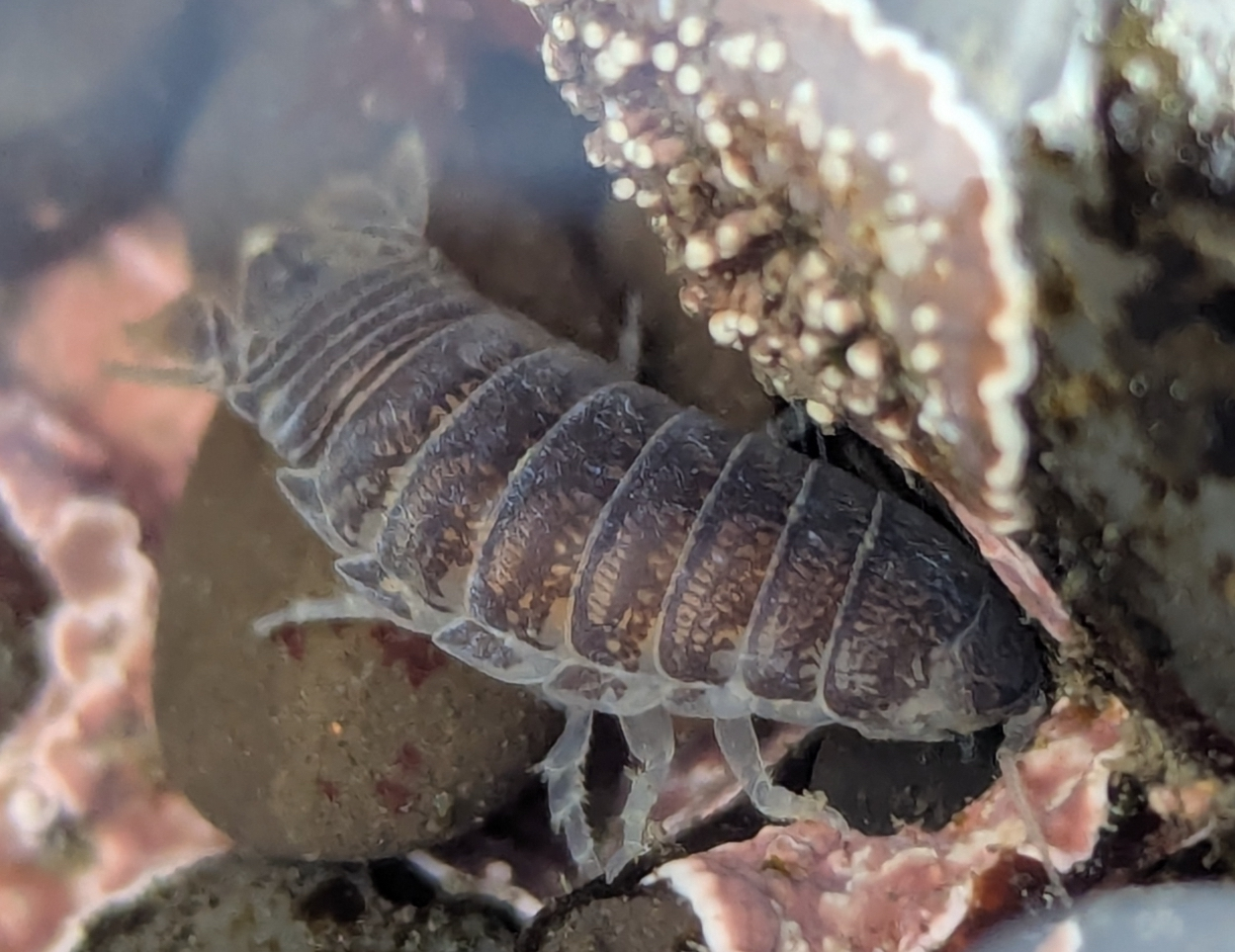

Scientific classification
- Kingdom: Animalia
- Phylum: Arthropoda
- Clade: Pancrustacea
- Class: Malacostraca
- Order: Isopoda
- Family: Cirolanidae
- Genus: Cirolana
- Species: C. harfordi

Binomial name
- Cirolana harfordi Lockington, 1877

Synonyms
- Aega harfordii Lockington, 1877; Cirolana toyamaensis Nunomura, 1982

= Cirolana harfordi =

Species of crustacean

Cirolana harfordi, or Harford's isopod, is a species of a marine crustacean in the order Isopoda. It is found in mussel beds, under rocks, and on sandy beaches in the Pacific Ocean. The species was originally described by William N. Lockington in 1877 under the name Aega harfordii.

== Description ==
Cirolana harfordi has an oval, dorsoventrally compressed body, and a pair of antennae, which it uses for finding food and mates. Its body is generally white with fine brown spots, and it can reach up to 2 cm in length.

== Ecology ==
Cirolana harfordi can be described as both a scavenger and a predator, feeding on crustaceans and polychaetes, particularly Syllis fasciata. The food from one meal can fill the isopod's elastic digestive system and can nutritionally sustain this organism for three weeks.

== Life cycle ==
Female Cirolana harfordi will give birth one or two times during their two-year lifespan. Like all members of the superorder Peracarida, they lay their eggs directly into a special pouch called the marsupium, located between the 3rd and 6th walking legs. The young are brooded here for 3 to 4 months while they undergo several molts, after which they emerge as mancae, or juveniles that closely resemble the adult form. Each brood contains 18 to 68 young.

== Human interactions ==
When Cirolana harfordi group into large aggregations, they can become a concern for humans and fisheries. The isopods can attack living fish, especially those cultured in nets or caught in traps, and kill them. There is also one report of a potential C. harfordi swarm biting and hospitalizing a teenager in Melbourne, Australia. Another expert thought the injuries were caused by an Amphipod species instead of an Isopod, however The species does not usually reach aggregation densities great enough to pose a concern, but in Australia, C. harfordi is an invasive species and lacks natural predators to limit its population growth.
