= Natatolana albicaudata =

Scientific classification
- Kingdom: Animalia
- Phylum: Arthropoda
- Class: Malacostraca
- Order: Isopoda
- Family: Cirolanidae
- Genus: Natatolana
- Species: N. albicaudata

Binomial name
- Natatolana albicaudata (Stebbing, 1900)

Species of crustacean

Approximate syntype site: New Britain'"`UNIQ--ref-00000006-QINU`"'

Natatolana albicaudata is a species of crustacean in the family Cirolanidae, and was first described by Thomas Roscoe Rede Stebbing in 1900 as Cirolana albicaudata, based on specimens collected in Blanche Bay, New Britain, Papua New Guinea.

It is a benthic species, living at depths of 0 m - 250 m in tropical waters, and has been found on coral reefs in waters off Queensland, Western Australia and Papua New Guinea. It is not a scavenger. Keable (2006) gives the latest description and diagnosis.
