= Natatolana aotearoa =

Scientific classification
- Kingdom: Animalia
- Phylum: Arthropoda
- Class: Malacostraca
- Order: Isopoda
- Family: Cirolanidae
- Genus: Natatolana
- Species: N. aotearoa

Binomial name
- Natatolana aotearoa Keable, 2006

Species of crustacean

Holotype site: Milford Sound, NZ'"`UNIQ--ref-00000006-QINU`"'

Natatolana aotearoa is a species of crustacean in the family Cirolanidae, and was first described by Stephen John Keable in 2006.

It is a benthic species, living at depths of 13 – 520 m in temperate waters.
