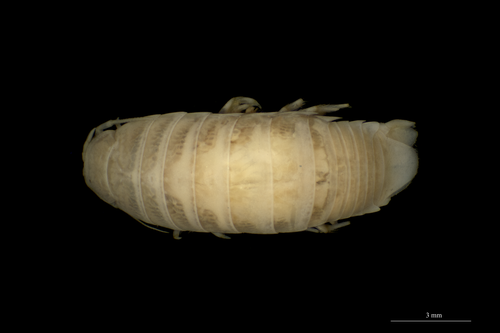
- Syntype (Bay of Naples)
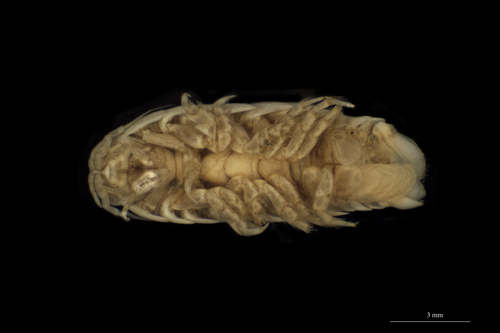
- Syntype (Bay of Naples)

Scientific classification
- Kingdom: Animalia
- Phylum: Arthropoda
- Class: Malacostraca
- Order: Isopoda
- Family: Cirolanidae
- Genus: Natatolana
- Species: N. neglecta

Binomial name
- Natatolana neglecta (Hansen, 1890)

Synonyms
- Cirolana neglecta Hansen, 1890

= Natatolana neglecta =

Species of crustacean

Syntype sites: Gulf of Naples and Nice'"`UNIQ--ref-0000000A-QINU`"'

Natatolana neglecta is a species of crustacean in the family Cirolanidae, and was first described by Hans Jacob Hansen in 1890 as Cirolana neglecta, It was redescribed as Natatolana neglecta by Stephen Keable and Niel L. Bruce in 1997.

It is a benthic species, living at depths of 19 m - 188 m in subtropical waters. and is found in the Mediterranean. It is a scavenger, and has been found feeding off Caretta caretta. and species of elasmobranchs. Its scavenging poses a threat to fishing in the Aegean.

Keable (2006) gives a description and diagnosis, and Rincon and others (2014) give a further description.
