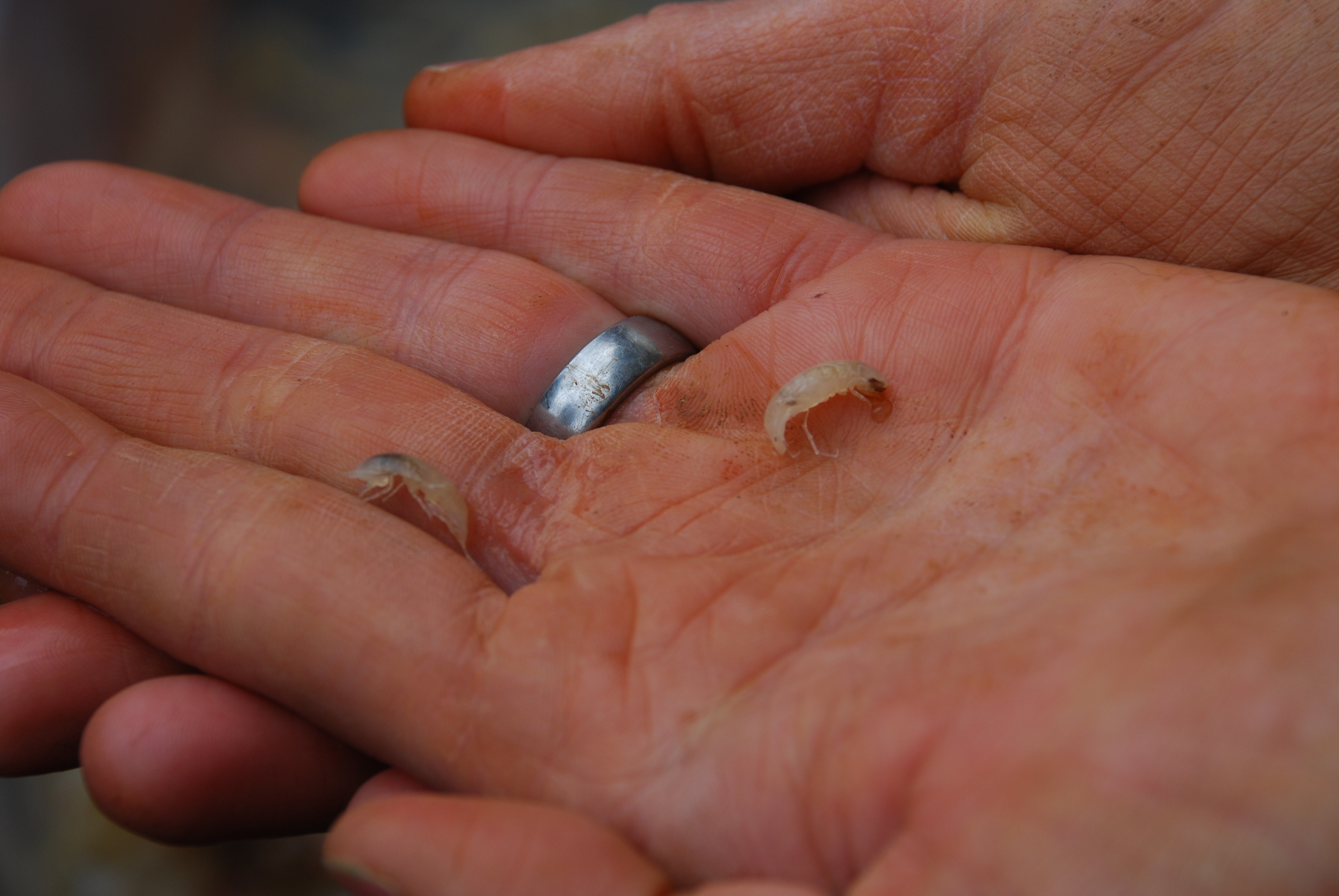

Conservation status
- Vulnerable (IUCN 3.1)

- Vulnerable (NatureServe)

Scientific classification
- Kingdom: Animalia
- Phylum: Arthropoda
- Class: Malacostraca
- Order: Isopoda
- Family: Cirolanidae
- Genus: Antrolana; Bowman, 1964
- Species: A. lira

Binomial name
- Antrolana lira Bowman, 1964

= Antrolana =

Genus of crustaceans

Antrolana lira, also known as The Madison Cave isopod, is a freshwater, cave-dwelling crustacean species. It is in the family Cirolanidae and it is the only species of its genus Antrolana. This isopod can be found in flooded limestone caves and karst aquifers throughout the Great Appalachian Valley of Virginia and West Virginia. The Madison Cave isopod has been listed as a vulnerable species on the IUCN Red List since 1983 and as a threatened species under the United States Endangered Species Act since 1982. The species was named after the cave in which it was first discovered, Madison Saltpetre Cave. Very little is known about the life history and behavior of the Madison Cave isopod.

== Description ==
Madison Cave isopods are the largest subterranean isopods in the eastern United States. Adult males reach a length of 15 mm (0.59 in) and a width of 5 mm (0.20 in). Adult females reach a length of 18 mm (0.71 in) and a width of 6 mm (0.24 in). Their bodies are flat with 7 pairs of legs, the first pair being modified to grab objects. They have two pairs of antennae, one short and one long. They are completely unpigmented and have no eyes.

== Life History ==
The Madison Cave isopod's reproduction mechanism is currently unknown. In related isopod species, females incubate fertilized eggs in a ventral marsupium after mating, though this has never been observed in any captured Madison Cave isopod. It is inferred that the species has a low reproductive potential, as the majority of samples consist of very few to no juveniles and no egg-bearing females.

Based on sampling data, populations of Madison Cave isopods tend to skew towards a female-biased sex ratio, ranging from 2.2 to 3.7 females per male. However, it has been suggested that this sex ratio may be due to differential responses of females and males to shrimp bait.

== Ecology ==
=== Diet ===
The feeding habits of Madison Cave isopods are unknown, but they are believed to be carnivorous as they readily consume shrimp bait. Insect parts were found in the stomachs of several individuals from Steger's Fissure.

=== Behavior ===
Most other Madison Cave isopods spend much of their time walking along the bottoms of pools. However, the Madison Cave isopod swims freely through calcite-rich-waters in the caves it occupies. There is no information available on its mating, foraging, and territorial behaviors.

=== Habitat ===
The Madison Cave isopod lives in water that ranges in temperature from 11 to 14 °C (52 to 57 °F). Plates of calcite are often found floating on the surface of the aquifers it occupies, which indicates that the water is supersaturated with calcium carbonates. The levels of water in the karst aquifers it occupies can vary by tens of meters in certain areas.

=== Range ===
The Madison Cave isopod is found within a 200-mile (320 km) range that extends from Lexington, Virginia to Charles Town, West Virginia. All population sites are found within a 15 mile wide belt, with known population centers in the Waynesboro-Grottoes area (Augusta County, VA), the Harrisonburg area (Rockingham County, VA), and the valley of the main stem of the Shenandoah River (Warren and Clarke counties, VA, and Jefferson County, WV).

== Conservation ==
=== Population size ===
The exact number of populations of Madison Cave isopods is unknown. Heavy folding and faulting in the Shenandoah Valley area suggests limited connectivity between the aquifers in which the Madison Cave isopod is found. The isopods from all seven sites most likely make up between 1 and 7 distinct genetic populations, despite being morphologically identical. At most sites, the population size of the Madison Cave isopod is unknown, although rough estimates for Madison Saltpetre Cave and Steger's Fissure exist. Sampling done at Madison Saltpetre Cave and Steger's Fissure found 1972 (± 851) and 6678 (± 3782) isopods per two hours, respectively. These are huge populations compared to the other five sites, where a total of 33 individuals had been collected from 1990 to 1996.

=== Past and current geographical distribution ===
Prior to 1990, Madison Cave isopods had only been found in Madison Saltpetre Cave and in Steger's Fissure, which is located about 100 meters north-northeast of the cave. Since then, they have been identified and collected from five more sites. Front Royal Caverns is the most isolated and northernmost site. All seven sites are found within the Shenandoah Valley.

=== Major threats ===
Madison Cave isopod populations are very small and reproduce at low rates. They are therefore very sensitive to disturbances. Urban development in the northern part of Madison Cave isopod's range and agricultural runoff in the Shenandoah Valley increases the probability of pollutants entering the groundwater. Front Royal Caverns are especially vulnerable to urban development because of its proximity to U.S. Highway 340. Fourteen new homes and a large church were built in the recharge area of the Front Royal Caverns aquifer. The exact recharge zones of the aquifers at any location with Madison Cave isopods are unknown, so the total impact of pollution into groundwater is difficult to predict. When Madison Saltpetre cave was open to the public for commercial tours, it was subject to vandalism. The cave is currently managed by the Cave Conservancy of the Virginias and protected by a gate.

=== Listing under the ESA ===
The Madison Cave isopod was first proposed as a threatened species in January 1977, after it was found in only three small pools of water; two of which were in Madison Saltpetre Cave. The proposal was withdrawn after the listing procedures changed by the 1978 amendment to the Endangered Species Act. A report by Bolgiano found that the isopod were threatened by human vandalism and mercury pollution in the South River. The South River is connected underground to the pools where Madison Cave isopods are found. It was officially listed as a threatened species in November 1982.

=== 5-year review ===
A 5-year review was initiated twice: for the first time in December 2008, and again in November 2021, although the formal review has not been completed as of April 2022.

=== Species status assessment ===
The Species Status Assessment is not yet available for the Madison Cave isopod.

=== Recovery plan ===
The recovery plan for the Madison Cave isopod was first established in September 1996, and is still ongoing as of April 2022. The plan focuses on six major action items, some of which were initiated before 1995, and others initiated in 2007. There is still no estimated completion date for these items. The six main points of the recovery plan are:

1. Determine the number of genetic populations
  - Random Amplification of Polymorphic DNA (RAPD) will be used to analyze the genetic distance between individuals at all seven sites to determine the number of genetic populations. RAPD will be used because not much is known about the genetic information of the Madison Cave isopod and a small amount of DNA is needed to analyze a large set of polymorphisms.
2. Search for additional populations
  - The large gap between the population of Madison Cave isopods at Front Royal caverns and the other sites indicates that additional populations are possible. Search efforts should focus on well samples in this gap, along with searches in caves within the deep karst aquifer habitat.
3. Identify potential sources and entry points of contamination of the deep karst aquifer habitat
  - Outline the recharge zone of deep karst aquifers
  - Monitor the effects of land use patterns on potential and identified recharge zones of deep karst aquifers
4. Protect known populations and habitats, taking a watershed perspective
  - Enforce existing regulations to protect Madison Cave isopod and its deep aquifer habitat
  - Encourage cooperation among landowners and governmental and nongovernmental agencies in achieving long-term protection of Madison Cave isopod habitat
5. Collect baseline ecological data for management and recovery
  - Characterize the habitat requirements of Madison Cave isopod and monitor the habitat conditions
  - Estimate population size and monitor population trends
  - Develop methods for and conduct life history and population viability studies
6. Implement recovery progress program
  - The U.S. Fish and Wildlife Service will be responsible for arranging an informal recovery group to meet when needed to make sure the recovery plan is being implemented effectively and with complete cooperation.
