= Natatolana helenae =

Scientific classification
- Kingdom: Animalia
- Phylum: Arthropoda
- Class: Malacostraca
- Order: Isopoda
- Family: Cirolanidae
- Genus: Natatolana
- Species: N. helenae

Binomial name
- Natatolana helenae Keable, 2006

Species of crustacean

Holotype (QM W18851) site: Gulf of Carpentaria'"`UNIQ--ref-00000006-QINU`"'

Natatolana helenae is a species of crustacean in the family Cirolanidae, and was first described by Stephen John Keable in 2006. The species epithet, helenae, honours Helen Stoddart.

It is a benthic species, living at depths of about 10 m in tropical waters, and is known only from the Gulf of Carpentaria.
