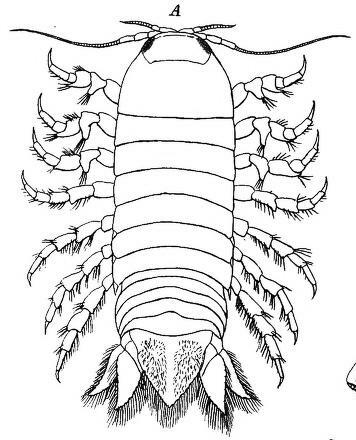
- (Part of Plate XXXIII)

Scientific classification
- Kingdom: Animalia
- Phylum: Arthropoda
- Class: Malacostraca
- Order: Isopoda
- Family: Cirolanidae
- Genus: Aatolana
- Species: A. schioedtei

Binomial name
- Aatolana schioedtei (Miers, 1884)

= Aatolana schioedtei =

Species of crustacean

Aatolana schioedtei is a species of crustaceans in the family Cirolanidae, first described by Edward J. Miers in 1884 as Cirolana schioedtei. In 1993, Bruce reassigned the species to the genus, Aatolana.

It is a benthic shrimp found in tropical waters at depths of 16 m to 173 m off the coasts of Western Australia, the Northern Territory, and Queensland.
