= Natatolana brucei =

Scientific classification
- Kingdom: Animalia
- Phylum: Arthropoda
- Class: Malacostraca
- Order: Isopoda
- Family: Cirolanidae
- Genus: Natatolana
- Species: N. brucei

Binomial name
- Natatolana brucei Keable, 2006

Species of crustacean

Holotype site: Grotto Point, NSW'"`UNIQ--ref-00000006-QINU`"'

Natatolana brucei is a species of crustacean in the family Cirolanidae, and was first described by Stephen John Keable in 2006. The species epithet, brucei, honours Neil L. Bruce.

It is a benthic species, living at depths of 10 – 40 m in subtropical waters, along the east coast of Australia. It is a scavenger.
