= Stenasellus stygopersicus =

Scientific classification
- Kingdom: Animalia
- Phylum: Arthropoda
- Class: Malacostraca
- Order: Isopoda
- Family: Stenasellidae
- Genus: Stenasellus
- Species: S. stygopersicus

Binomial name
- Stenasellus stygopersicus Jugovic, Malek-Hosseini & Issartel, 2024

Species of crustacean

Stenasellus stygopersicus is a species of isopod from the family Stenasellidae. It was discovered by researchers in Iran and described in 2024.

== Etymology and discovery ==
The name Stenasellus stygopersicus is derived from a combination of stygo (from the ancient Greek stýx) and persicus, in reference to Persia (another name for Iran) where the species was discovered. The isopod is the second species of Stenasellus discovered in Iran. Researchers found the species inhabiting the Chah Kabootari Cave in Iran, and described the species for the first time in 2024.

The cave researchers found the species is rich in hydrogen sulfide and was described as smelling like rotten eggs. The cave belongs to the Tashan-Chah Kabootari aquifer on the Zagros Mountains, and is fed by sulfidic groundwater. The Chah Kabootari Cave is adjacent to the Tashan Cave, which is the locality of Stenasellus tashanicus, the first recorded species of Stenasellidae from Iran.

== Description ==
Researchers found that the species is characterized by a body size of ≥ 20 mm (0.79 in), a female-biased sexual size dimorphism, and a distinct black-pigmented Bellonci's organ. The species has a "coral pink" color. Its size and sexual dimorphism cause the species to be distinct from related isopods. Males are about a 0.5 in (13 mm) long, have a coral-colored body, and a head described as "trapezoidal". The females are much bigger, with the body size of the longest measured at 0.88 in (22 mm). Like all species in its genus, Senasellus stygopersicus is "eyeless", likely due to its pitch black environment.
