= Speocirolana thermydronis =

Conservation status
- Endangered (IUCN 2.3)

Scientific classification
- Kingdom: Animalia
- Phylum: Arthropoda
- Class: Malacostraca
- Order: Isopoda
- Family: Cirolanidae
- Genus: Speocirolana
- Species: S. thermydronis

Binomial name
- Speocirolana thermydronis Cole & W. L. Minckley, 1966

Species of crustacean

Speocirolana thermydronis is a species of crustacean in the family Cirolanidae. It is endemic to Mexico and only known from springs near Cuatro Ciénegas, Coahuila. Its habitat is threatened by irrigation.

The holotype is a female measuring 15 mm (0.6 in) from the tip of the head to the end of the telson.
