= Aatolana rapax =

Scientific classification
- Kingdom: Animalia
- Phylum: Arthropoda
- Class: Malacostraca
- Order: Isopoda
- Family: Cirolanidae
- Genus: Aatolana
- Species: A. rapax

Binomial name
- Aatolana rapax Bruce, 1993

Species of crustacean

Holotype site: Madang, Papua New Guinea'"`UNIQ--ref-00000006-QINU`"'

Aatolana rapax is a species of crustaceans in the family Cirolanidae, first described by Niel L. Bruce in 1993.

It is a benthic shrimp found in tropical waters at depths of 150 m to 200 m off the coasts of Papua New Guinea, Western Australia, the Northern Territory, and Queensland.
