= Mexistenasellus floridensis =

Conservation status
- Critically Imperiled (NatureServe)

Scientific classification
- Kingdom: Animalia
- Phylum: Arthropoda
- Class: Malacostraca
- Order: Isopoda
- Family: Stenasellidae
- Genus: Mexistenasellus
- Species: M. floridensis

Binomial name
- Mexistenasellus floridensis Lewis and Sawicki, 2016

Species of crustacean

Mexistenasellus floridensis, the Florida cave isopod, is a species of isopod crustacean in the family Stenasellidae. It is endemic to Jackson County, Florida in the United States, where it is found only a single cave system within the Floridan aquifer.
