= Sphaerolana affinis =

Conservation status
- Endangered (IUCN 2.3)

Scientific classification
- Kingdom: Animalia
- Phylum: Arthropoda
- Class: Malacostraca
- Order: Isopoda
- Family: Cirolanidae
- Genus: Sphaerolana
- Species: S. affinis

Binomial name
- Sphaerolana affinis Cole & Minckley, 1970

Species of crustacean

Sphaerolana affinis is a species of isopod in the family Cirolanidae. It is endemic to Mexico.
