= Natatolana paranarica =

Scientific classification
- Kingdom: Animalia
- Phylum: Arthropoda
- Class: Malacostraca
- Order: Isopoda
- Family: Cirolanidae
- Genus: Natatolana
- Species: N. paranarica

Binomial name
- Natatolana paranarica Keable, 2006

Species of crustacean

Paratype (QM W18897) site: Palliser Bay, off the North Island'"`UNIQ--ref-00000006-QINU`"'

Natatolana paranarica is a species of crustacean in the family Cirolanidae, and was first described by Stephen John Keable in 2006. The species epithet, paranarica, was given because of the species' likeness to Natatolana narica.

It is a benthic species, living at depths of about 6 m in temperate waters, and is known only from the type locality.
