= Arubolana =

Scientific classification
- Kingdom: Animalia
- Phylum: Arthropoda
- Clade: Pancrustacea
- Class: Malacostraca
- Order: Isopoda
- Family: Cirolanidae
- Genus: Arubolana; Botosaneanu & Stock, 1979

Type species
- Arubolana imula

Genus of crustaceans

Arubolana is a genus of isopods in the family Cirolanidae. The species of the genus are entirely adapted to living subterraneanly. They are found in the Caribbean and North Atlantic Ocean, where they inhabit underground freshwater, brackish, and marine ecosystems on the islands of Aruba, Bermuda, Hispaniola, and Jamaica.

== Taxonomy ==
The genus Arubolana was erected in 1979 by Lazare Botosaneanu and Jan Hendrik Stock for the species Arubolana imula, which they described in the same paper based on specimens collected from Aruba. The name of the genus is an amalgamation of Aruba and Cirolana, another genus of subterranean isopods. Bowman and Iliffe described the genus and species Bermudalana aruboides from Bermuda in 1983, acknowledging that although they had tentatively placed the species in its own genus, it may be better placed in Arubolana. In 1984, Jos Notenboom transferred aruboides into the genus Arubolana, with the analysis of adult specimens of A. imula allowing them to conclude that the genus Bermudalana should be synonymised. He also described the species A. parvioculata from Jamaica in the same paper. In 2010, Botosaneanu and Stock described a fourth species, A. rotunditelson, from the Dominican Republic.

Arubolana contains the following species:

- Arubolana aruboides (Bowman & Iliffe, 1983)
- Arubolana imula Botosaneanu & Stock, 1979
- Arubolana parvioculata Notenboom, 1984
- Arubolana rotunditelson Botosaneanu & Stock, 2010

== Distribution and ecology ==
The genus Arubolana is found in the Caribbean and North Atlantic Ocean, where its species are found in underground freshwater habitats on the islands of Aruba, Bermuda, Hispaniola, and Jamaica. They have a fairly wide range of habitats, occurring in waters of widely-varying salinity such as freshwater pools in karst caves, brackish tunnels and subterreanean rivers, and anchialine caves filled with ocean water.
