= Natatolana flexura =

Scientific classification
- Kingdom: Animalia
- Phylum: Arthropoda
- Class: Malacostraca
- Order: Isopoda
- Family: Cirolanidae
- Genus: Natatolana
- Species: N. flexura

Binomial name
- Natatolana flexura Keable, 2006

Species of crustacean

Holotype (AM P47222) site: Fortescue Bay, TAS'"`UNIQ--ref-00000006-QINU`"'

Natatolana flexura is a species of crustacean in the family Cirolanidae, and was first described by Stephen John Keable in 2006.

It is a benthic species, living at depths of 100 m in temperate waters, off the Queensland, New South Wales and Tasmanian coasts.
