= Sphaerolana karenae =

Conservation status
- Vulnerable (IUCN 2.3)

Scientific classification
- Kingdom: Animalia
- Phylum: Arthropoda
- Class: Malacostraca
- Order: Isopoda
- Family: Cirolanidae
- Genus: Sphaerolana
- Species: S. karenae

Binomial name
- Sphaerolana karenae Rodriguez-Almaraz & Bowman, 1995

Species of crustacean

Sphaerolana karenae is a species of isopod in the family Cirolanidae. It is endemic to Mexico.
