= Sphaerolana interstitialis =

Conservation status
- Endangered (IUCN 2.3)

Scientific classification
- Kingdom: Animalia
- Phylum: Arthropoda
- Class: Malacostraca
- Order: Isopoda
- Family: Cirolanidae
- Genus: Sphaerolana
- Species: S. interstitialis

Binomial name
- Sphaerolana interstitialis Cole & Minckley, 1970

Species of crustacean

Sphaerolana interstitialis is a species of isopod in the family Cirolanidae. It is endemic to Mexico.
