= Natatolana honu =

Scientific classification
- Kingdom: Animalia
- Phylum: Arthropoda
- Class: Malacostraca
- Order: Isopoda
- Family: Cirolanidae
- Genus: Natatolana
- Species: N. honu

Binomial name
- Natatolana honu Keable, 2006

Species of crustacean

Holotype & Paratype sites(NIWA 18745NIWA 18746, NIWA 18747): West coast of New Zealand'"`UNIQ--ref-00000008-QINU`"'

Natatolana honu is a species of crustacean in the family Cirolanidae, and was first described by Stephen John Keable in 2006. The species epithet, honu, comes from a Māori word meaning "deep".

It is a benthic species, living at depths of 1120 – 1313 m in temperate waters, off the west coasts of the North and South Islands of New Zealand.
