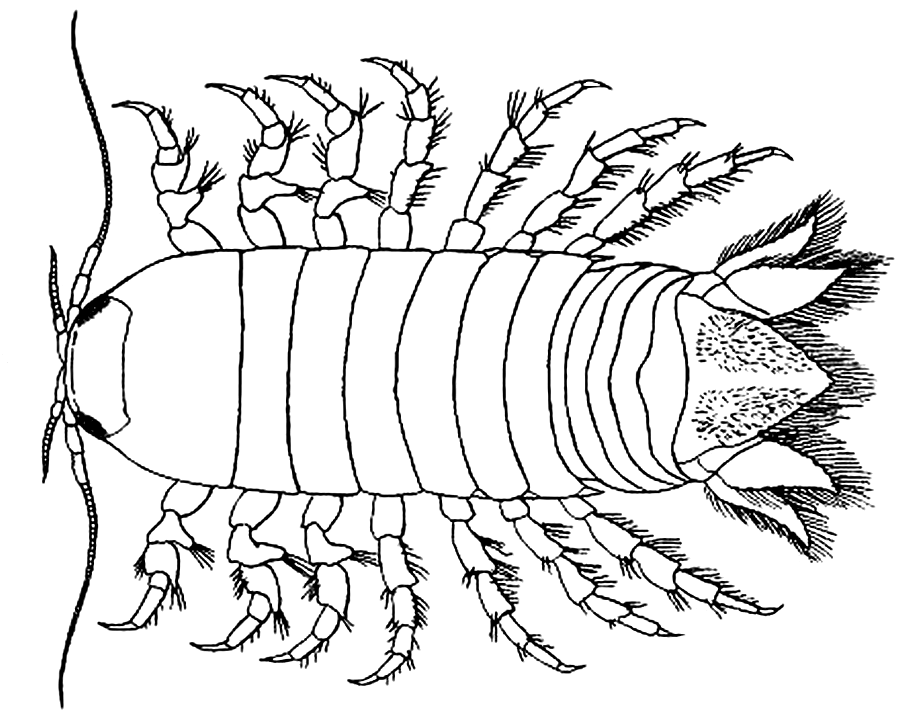
- A. schioedtei (Part of Plate XXXIII)

Scientific classification
- Kingdom: Animalia
- Phylum: Arthropoda
- Class: Malacostraca
- Order: Isopoda
- Family: Cirolanidae
- Genus: Aatolana; Bruce, 1993

= Aatolana =

Genus of crustaceans

Aatolana is a genus of isopod crustaceans in the family Cirolanidae, first described by Niel L. Bruce in 1993. The genus name is from the Greek, Aatos (insatiable), and refers to the ability of shrimp of this genus to devour fish carcasses. The type species is Aatolana rapax.

It is found in waters off the coasts of Western Australia, the Northern Territory, Queensland and New South Wales.

== Species ==
These three species are currently recognised:

- Aatolana rapax Bruce, 1993
- Aatolana schioedtei (Miers, 1884)
- Aatolana springthorpei Keable, 1998
