= Speocirolana xilitla =

Scientific classification
- Kingdom: Animalia
- Phylum: Arthropoda
- Class: Malacostraca
- Order: Isopoda
- Family: Cirolanidae
- Genus: Speocirolana
- Species: S. xilitla

Binomial name
- Speocirolana xilitla Alvarez & Villalobos, 2008

Species of crustacean

Speocirolana xilitla is a species of crustacean in the family Cirolanidae. It is known from a cave near Xilitla, San Luis Potosi. The specific name refers to this town. It is the southernmost species in the genus Speocirolana.

== Habitat ==
The type series was collected from a clear-water pond in Cueva de las Catarinas, in complete darkness some 120 meters from its entrance. The altitude is 645 m (2,116 ft) above sea level.

== Description ==
Speocirolana xilitla is among the largest members of its genus: the largest female (the holotype) measures 32.5 mm (1.3 in) in total length. The body is 2.5 times as long as wide. The pleotelson is rounded. No males are known.
