= Natatolana lilliput =

Scientific classification
- Kingdom: Animalia
- Phylum: Arthropoda
- Class: Malacostraca
- Order: Isopoda
- Family: Cirolanidae
- Genus: Natatolana
- Species: N. lilliput

Binomial name
- Natatolana lilliput Keable, 2006

Species of crustacean

Paratype (G6001) site: Garretts Bight, TAS'"`UNIQ--ref-00000006-QINU`"'

Natatolana lilliput is a species of crustacean in the family Cirolanidae, and was first described by Stephen John Keable in 2006. The species epithet, lilliput, is from the Lilliput of Gulliver's Travels, and refers to the specie's short antennae.

It is a benthic species, living at depths of 3 – 25 m in temperate waters, and is found in waters of the Tasmanian Shelf Province. It is a scavenger.
