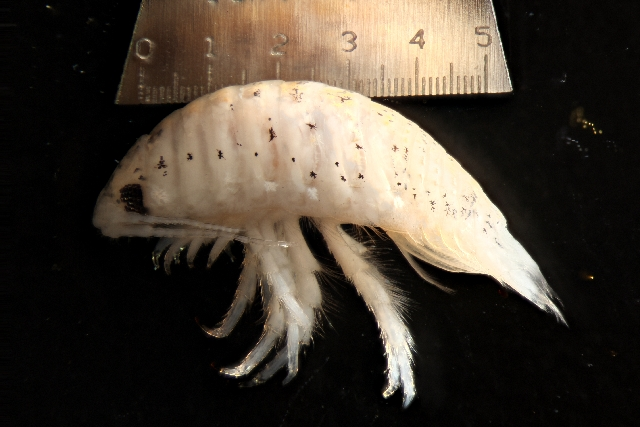

Scientific classification
- Kingdom: Animalia
- Phylum: Arthropoda
- Clade: Pancrustacea
- Class: Malacostraca
- Order: Isopoda
- Family: Cirolanidae
- Genus: Excirolana
- Species: E. chiltoni

Binomial name
- Excirolana chiltoni (Richardson, 1905)

Synonyms
- Cirolana kincaidi Hatch, 1947; Excirolana kincaidi (Hatch, 1947)

= Excirolana chiltoni =

Species of crustacean

Excirolana chiltoni, commonly known as "sand piranha", is a species of isopod in the family Cirolanidae.

== Distribution ==
They are native to warm tropical/subtropical nearshore shallow waters of Pacific coasts, from Japan and Korea to South China in the west and from the Pacific Northwest to Chocó Colombia in the east, being commonly described as a "water-line isopod".

== Biology ==
Feeding on human flesh

E. chiltoni grows to be around 8 mm (0.31 in) long and can form swarms of more than 1,000 individuals. They are scavengers/detritivores that spend most of their lives burrowed beneath the sandy beaches (i.e. arenicolous), and are most active during high tides. They feed on proteinaceous materials such as decaying carcasses of dead aquatic animals that are washed ashore, and can occasionally vigorously bite and chew on the skin of beachgoing humans and other animals.
