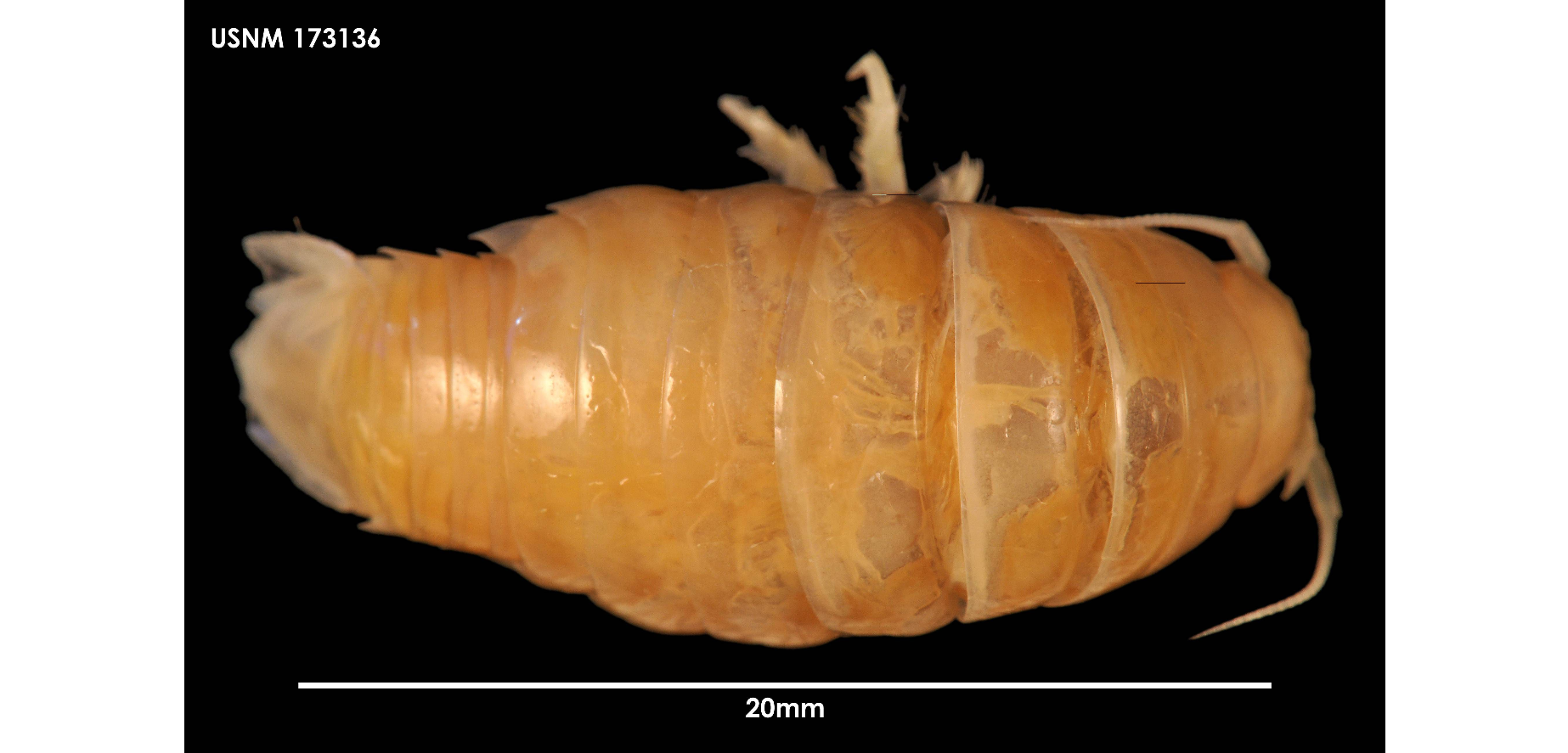

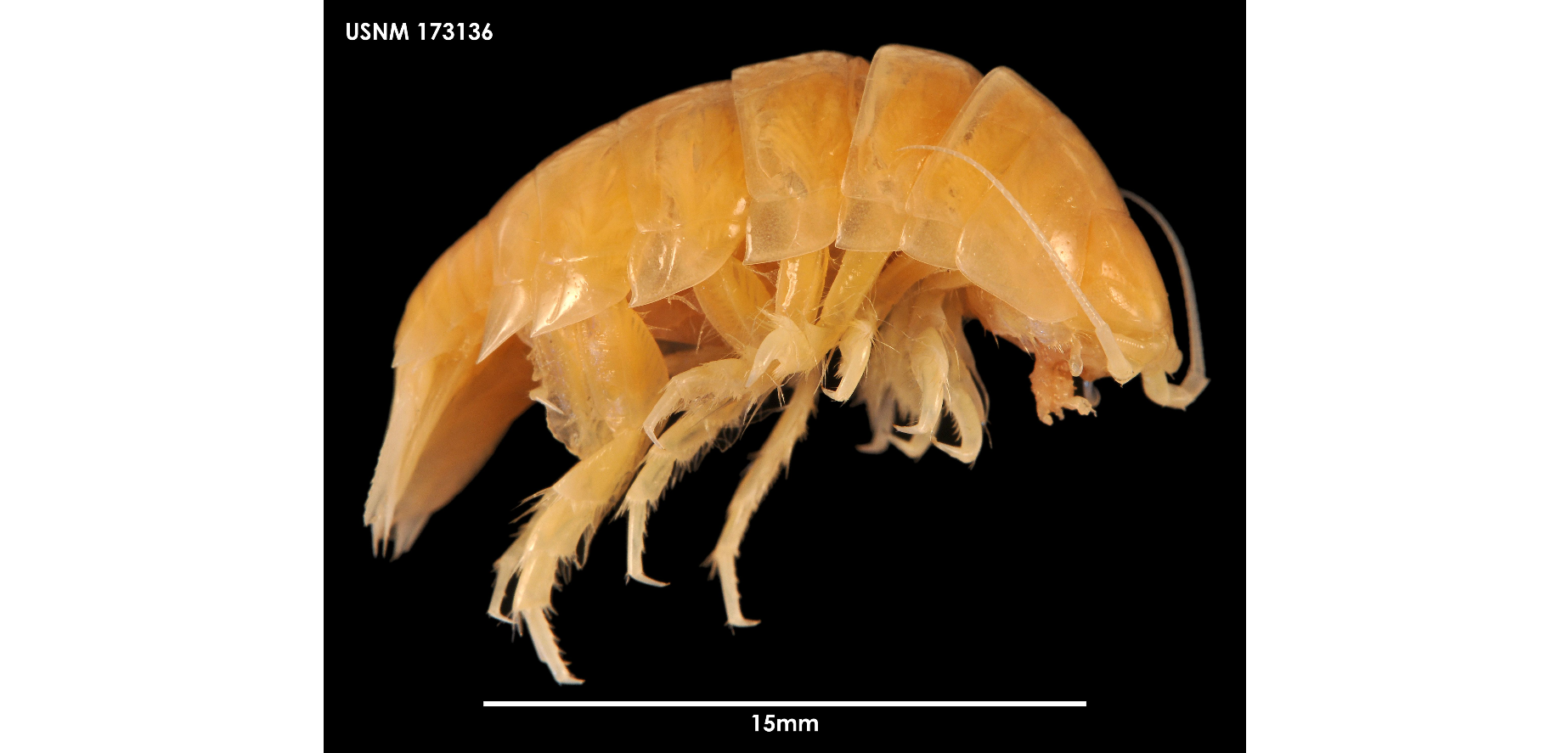
- USNM 173136

Scientific classification
- Kingdom: Animalia
- Phylum: Arthropoda
- Class: Malacostraca
- Order: Isopoda
- Family: Cirolanidae
- Genus: Natatolana
- Species: N. oculata

Binomial name
- Natatolana oculata (Vanhöffen, 1914)

Synonyms
- Cirolana oculata (Vanhöffen, 1914

= Natatolana oculata =

Species of crustacean

Natatolana oculata is a species of crustacean in the family Cirolanidae, and was first described by Ernst Vanhöffen in 1914 as Cirolana oculata. It was redescribed as Natatolana oculata by Stephen Keable in 2006.

It is a benthic species, living at depths of 43 – 840 m and is found in the waters of the Antarctic. It is a scavenger.
