= Natatolana femina =

Scientific classification
- Kingdom: Animalia
- Phylum: Arthropoda
- Class: Malacostraca
- Order: Isopoda
- Family: Cirolanidae
- Genus: Natatolana
- Species: N. femina

Binomial name
- Natatolana femina Keable, 2006

Species of crustacean

Holotype (AM 47232) site: Marouard Beach, TAS'"`UNIQ--ref-00000006-QINU`"'

Natatolana femina is a species of crustacean in the family Cirolanidae, and was first described by Stephen John Keable in 2006. The species epithet, femina, refers to the fact that no mature males were examined, only females.

It is a benthic species, found at depths of 5 – 15 m in temperate waters of the Tasmanian Shelf Province. It is a scavenger.
