= Colopisthus canna =

Scientific classification
- Kingdom: Animalia
- Phylum: Arthropoda
- Class: Malacostraca
- Order: Isopoda
- Family: Cirolanidae
- Genus: Colopisthus
- Species: C. canna

Binomial name
- Colopisthus canna Moore & Brusca, 2003

Species of crustacean

Colopisthus canna is a species of crustacean isopods of the family Cirolanidae that lives in Cape Verde. The species was described in 2003 by W. Moore and R. C. Brusca, based on individuals collected on São Vicente. São Vicente is the only known place where it occurs.
