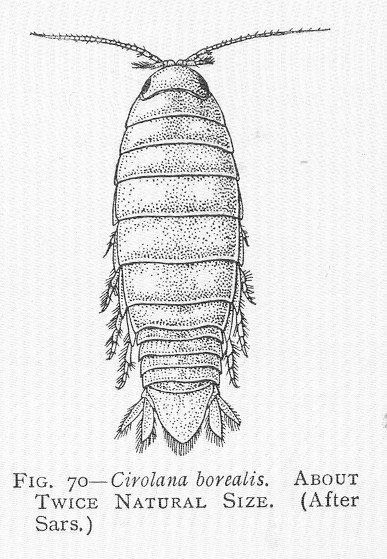
- N. borealis as Cirolana borealis

Scientific classification
- Kingdom: Animalia
- Phylum: Arthropoda
- Class: Malacostraca
- Order: Isopoda
- Family: Cirolanidae
- Genus: Natatolana; Bruce, 1981

= Natatolana =

Natatolana Temporal range: Hauterivian to present 130–0 Ma

Genus of crustaceans

Natatolana is a genus of crustaceans in the family Cirolanidae, first described by Niel L. Bruce in 1981. The type species is Cirolana hirtipes Milne Edwards, 1840.

It is found at depths of about 200 m, in waters off the coasts of all Australian states, and also the Australian territory of Ashmore and Cartier Islands.

== Species ==
WoRMS lists over 70 species:

- Natatolana albicaudata (Stebbing, 1900)
- Natatolana amplocula Bruce, 1986
- Natatolana angula Bruce, 1986
- Natatolana anophthalma (Kussakin & Vasina, 1982)
- Natatolana aotearoa Keable, 2006
- Natatolana arcicauda (Holdich, Harrison & Bruce, 1981)
- Natatolana arrama Bruce, 1986
- Natatolana boko Bruce, 1986
- Natatolana borealis (Liljeborg, 1851)
- Natatolana bowmani Bruce, 1986
- Natatolana brucei Keable, 2006
- Natatolana bulba Bruce, 1986
- Natatolana buzwilsoni Keable, 2006
- Natatolana caeca (Dollfus, 1903)
- Natatolana californiensis (Schultz, 1966)
- Natatolana carlenae Brusca, Wetzer & France, 1995
- Natatolana chilensis (Menzies, 1962)
- Natatolana corpulenta (Hale, 1925)
- Natatolana curta (Richardson, 1910)
- Natatolana debrae Keable, 2006
- Natatolana endota Bruce, 1986
- Natatolana femina Keable, 2006
- Natatolana flexura Keable, 2006
- Natatolana galathea Bruce, 1986
- Natatolana gallica (Hansen, 1905)
- Natatolana gorung Bruce, 1986
- Natatolana gracilis (Hansen, 1890)
- Natatolana helenae Keable, 2006
- Natatolana hirtipes (H. Milne Edwards, 1840)
- Natatolana honu Keable, 2006
- Natatolana imicola (Dollfus, 1903)
- Natatolana insignis Hobbins & Jones, 1993
- Natatolana intermedia Vanhöffen, 1914
- Natatolana japonensis (Richardson, 1904)
- Natatolana kahiba Bruce, 1986
- Natatolana karkarook Bruce, 1986
- Natatolana laewilla Bruce, 1986
- Natatolana lilliput Keable, 2006
- Natatolana longispina Bruce, 1986
- Natatolana lowryi Keable, 1997
- Natatolana luticola (Holdich, Harrison & Bruce, 1981)
- Natatolana matong Bruce, 1986
- Natatolana meridionalis Hodgson, 1910
- Natatolana nammuldi Bruce, 1986
- Natatolana narica (Bowman, 1971)
- Natatolana natalensis (Barnard, 1940)
- Natatolana natalis (Menzies & George, 1972)
- Natatolana neglecta (Hansen, 1890)
- Natatolana nitida (Hale, 1952)
- Natatolana nukumbutho Bruce & Olesen, 1995
- Natatolana obtusata Vanhöffen, 1914
- Natatolana oculata Vanhöffen, 1914
- Natatolana pallidocula (Kussakin & Vasina, 1982)
- Natatolana paranarica Keable, 2006
- Natatolana pastorei (Giambiagi, 1925)
- Natatolana pellucida (Tattersall, 1921)
- Natatolana pilula (Barnard, 1955)
- Natatolana prolixa Bruce, 1986
- Natatolana rekohu Bruce, 2003
- Natatolana rossi (Miers, 1876)
- Natatolana rusteni Keable, 2006
- Natatolana sinuosa Keable, 2006
- Natatolana taiti Keable, 1997
- Natatolana tenuistylis (Miers, 1884)
- Natatolana thalme Bruce, 1986
- Natatolana thurar Bruce, 1986
- Natatolana valida (Hale, 1940)
- Natatolana variguberna (Holdich, Harrison & Bruce, 1981)
- Natatolana vieta (Hale, 1925)
- Natatolana virilis (Barnard, 1940)
- Natatolana woodjonesi (Hale, 1924)
- Natatolana wowine Bruce, 1986
- Natatolana zebra Keable, 2006
