= Natatolana debrae =

Scientific classification
- Kingdom: Animalia
- Phylum: Arthropoda
- Class: Malacostraca
- Order: Isopoda
- Family: Cirolanidae
- Genus: Natatolana
- Species: N. debrae

Binomial name
- Natatolana debrae Keable, 2006

Species of crustacean

Holotype (AM P31604) site: Henley Beach, SA'"`UNIQ--ref-00000006-QINU`"'

Natatolana debrae is a species of crustacean in the family Cirolanidae, and was first described by Stephen John Keable in 2006. The species epithet, debrae, honours Keable's wife, Debra.

It is a dimorphic, benthic species, found on tidal and subtidal flats, and known only from Gulf Saint Vincent. It is a scavenger.
