= Natatolana rusteni =

Scientific classification
- Kingdom: Animalia
- Phylum: Arthropoda
- Class: Malacostraca
- Order: Isopoda
- Family: Cirolanidae
- Genus: Natatolana
- Species: N. rusteni

Binomial name
- Natatolana rusteni Keable, 2006

Species of crustacean

Paratype (USNM 282730, NHMD 80241) site: off Dobroyd Point, Sydney'"`UNIQ--ref-00000006-QINU`"'

Natatolana rusteni is a species of crustacean in the family Cirolanidae, and was first described by Stephen John Keable in 2006. The species epithet, rusteni, honours Mr Jim Rusten, a former storeman at the Australian Museum.

It is a benthic species, living at depths of about 5–50 m in subtropical waters, off the east coast of Australia in the Central Eastern Shelf Province and Central Eastern Shelf Transition IMCRA zones. It is a scavenger.
