= Arubolana imula =

Conservation status
- Vulnerable (IUCN 2.3)

Scientific classification
- Kingdom: Animalia
- Phylum: Arthropoda
- Clade: Pancrustacea
- Class: Malacostraca
- Order: Isopoda
- Family: Cirolanidae
- Genus: Arubolana
- Species: A. imula

Binomial name
- Arubolana imula Botosaneanu & Stock, 1979

Species of crustacean

Arubolana imula is a species of crustacean in the family Cirolanidae, endemic to Aruba. It is the largest species in its genus, measuring 6.25 mm (0.25 in) long. They are completely blind and have no eyes. It is endemic to the Dutch island of Aruba, where it has only been documented from the Mangel Cora Tunnel in the Lago Colony. It lives in fine silt on the bottom of the tunnel where it scavenges and feeds on organic matter. It is classified as being vulnerable by the IUCN.

== Taxonomy ==
Arubolana imula was formally described in 1979 by Lazare Botosaneanu and Jan Hendrik Stock based on specimens collected from the Lago Colony in Aruba. Botosaneanu and Stock erected the genus Arubolana in the same paper describing the species to accommodate it. The specific epithet is derived from the Latin word meaning "the very deepest", alluding to the isopod's stygobiont lifestyle.

== Appearance ==
Arubolana imula is the largest species in its genus, measuring 6.25 mm (0.25 in) long. They are completely blind and have no eyes.

== Distribution and ecology ==
Arubolana imula is endemic to the Dutch island of Aruba in the Lesser Antilles of the Caribbean. The species has only ever been recorded from its type locality, the Mangel Cora Tunnel in the Lago Colony. This tunnel is partially man-made and was drilled into limestone to provide water to the Lago Oil and Transport Company's refinery on the island. The tunnel has a width of around 1 m (3.3 ft) and height of 2.5 m (8.2 ft), with slow-flowing waters about 1 m (3.3 ft) deep. The tunnel is almost entirely without light and has a bottom layer of fine silt. A. imula lives in this layer, where it scavenges and feeds on organic matter. It is most abundant near rotting wood. The water is brackish with highly variable salinity due to its proximity to both the ocean and fresh groundwater, changing from 13.4‰ to 37.8‰, and has high levels of chlorides. The isopod is considered to be euryhaline as it tolerates this wide range of salinity.

A 1996 assessment of the crustacean's conservation status by the IUCN classified it as being vulnerable.
