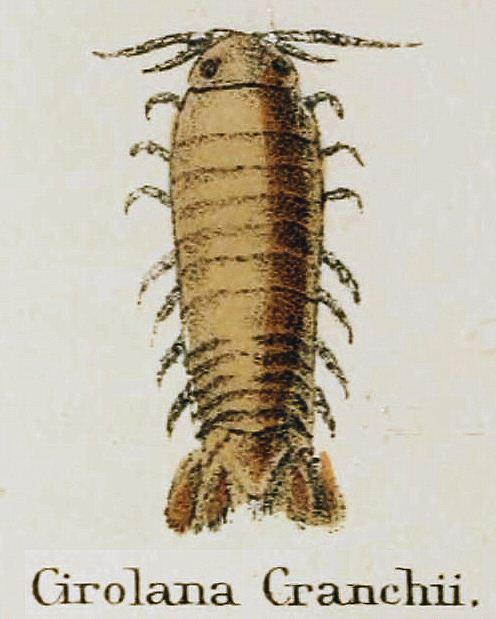

Scientific classification
- Kingdom: Animalia
- Phylum: Arthropoda
- Clade: Pancrustacea
- Class: Malacostraca
- Order: Isopoda
- Family: Cirolanidae
- Genus: Cirolana
- Species: C. cranchii

Binomial name
- Cirolana cranchii Leach, 1818

Synonyms
- Nelocira swainsonii Eurydice swainsonii Conilera grampoides Cirolana borealis

= Cirolana cranchii =

Species of crustacean

Cirolana cranchii is a species of isopod crustacean.

== History and etymology ==
Cirolana cranchii was described by the English zoologist William Elford Leach in 1818; he named the genus anagrammatically after an unknown woman called Caroline/Carolina, and the species after his friend and collector John Cranch.

Cirolana cranchii is the type species of the genus Cirolana, which in turn is the type genus for the family Cirolanidae. The type locality is Cornwall, Great Britain.

== Distribution ==
The species is found around the British Isles and the northwestern coasts of Portugal, Spain and France, with the greatest abundance around the western coasts of Ireland, Cornwall and Brittany. The species has also been recorded from the North Sea, the Mediterranean, and the coasts of Australia. Bruce and Ellis consider only the eastern North Atlantic and Mediterranean records reliable. Also reported from South Africa near Cape Town.

== Description ==
The adult male is between 9.0 and 19.1 mm long and about 3 times as long as it is wide. The head (cephalon) lacks a forward-pointing spine (rostral process). The body consists of 11 visible segments each covered in a smooth dorsal scale behind the head, with a triangular tail (pleotelson). There are six joints to the abdomen. The legs are used for walking and have small claws. Tail paddles (uropods) extend beyond the point of the tail. The female has a wider pleotelson and non-angled uropods, and lacks the dense bristles (setae) on these parts. Females are between 9.6 and 19.2 mm long. Young males resemble females.
