= Natatolana buzwilsoni =

Scientific classification
- Kingdom: Animalia
- Phylum: Arthropoda
- Class: Malacostraca
- Order: Isopoda
- Family: Cirolanidae
- Genus: Natatolana
- Species: N. buzwilsoni

Binomial name
- Natatolana buzwilsoni Keable, 2006

Species of crustacean

Paratype site: North West Shelf, WA'"`UNIQ--ref-00000006-QINU`"'

Natatolana buzwilsoni is a species of crustacean in the family Cirolanidae, and was first described by Stephen John Keable in 2006. The species epithet, buzwilsoni, honours George ('Buz') Wilson.

It is a benthic species, living at depths of 37 – 83 m in tropical waters, on the north-west (continental) shelf off Western Australia.
