= Natatolana sinuosa =

Scientific classification
- Kingdom: Animalia
- Phylum: Arthropoda
- Class: Malacostraca
- Order: Isopoda
- Family: Cirolanidae
- Genus: Natatolana
- Species: N. sinuosa

Binomial name
- Natatolana sinuosa Keable, 2006

Species of crustacean

Paratype (TMAG G6002) site: TAS'"`UNIQ--ref-00000006-QINU`"'

Natatolana sinuosa is a species of crustacean in the family Cirolanidae, and was first described by Stephen John Keable in 2006. The species epithet, sinuosa, describes the "sinuate posterior margins of the coxae".

It is an intertidal, benthic species, living at depths of about 0–30 m, in waters off South Australia, Victoria, Tasmania and New South Wales. It is sexually dimorphic.
