= Mexistenasellus parzefalli =

Conservation status
- Vulnerable (IUCN 3.1)

Scientific classification
- Kingdom: Animalia
- Phylum: Arthropoda
- Class: Malacostraca
- Order: Isopoda
- Family: Stenasellidae
- Genus: Mexistenasellus
- Species: M. parzefalli

Binomial name
- Mexistenasellus parzefalli Magniez, 1972

Species of crustacean

Mexistenasellus parzefalli is a species of isopod crustacean in the family Stenasellidae. It is endemic to Mexico.
