= Mexistenasellus coahuila =

Conservation status
- Endangered (IUCN 3.1)

- Imperiled (NatureServe)

Scientific classification
- Kingdom: Animalia
- Phylum: Arthropoda
- Class: Malacostraca
- Order: Isopoda
- Family: Stenasellidae
- Genus: Mexistenasellus
- Species: M. coahuila

Binomial name
- Mexistenasellus coahuila Cole & Minkley, 1972

Species of crustacean

Mexistenasellus coahuila, the Coahuila isopod, is a species of isopod crustacean in the family Stenasellidae. It is found in Mexico and Texas in the United States. Once thought to only live in southern North America, it has been found living outside Jacksonville, Florida in the Hole in Wall Cave. This discovery was thought to double the range of the Stenasellidae's existence in North America.
