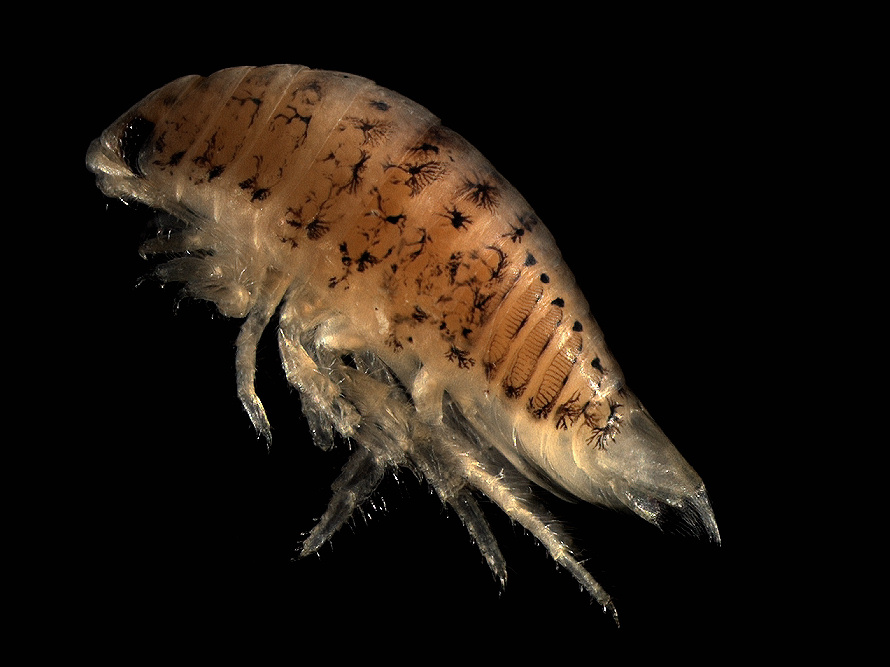

Scientific classification
- Kingdom: Animalia
- Phylum: Arthropoda
- Clade: Pancrustacea
- Class: Malacostraca
- Order: Isopoda
- Family: Cirolanidae
- Genus: Eurydice
- Species: E. pulchra

Binomial name
- Eurydice pulchra Leach, 1815

Synonyms
- Slabberina agata Van Beneden, 1861; Slabberina agilis G. O. Sars; Slabberina gracilis Bovallius

= Eurydice pulchra =

Species of crustacean

Eurydice pulchra, the speckled sea louse, is a carnivorous species of isopod crustacean found in the northeast Atlantic Ocean.

The generic name is for the nymph Eurydice of Greek mythology; the specific name means beautiful in Latin. The range of the species extends from Norway to the Atlantic coast of Morocco, but not into the Mediterranean Sea. It lives in the intertidal zone on sandy shores. It has large eyes and long antennae, is grey to brown in colour, and has black spots (each one a chromatophore) on all its body surfaces. Males grow up to 8 millimetres (0.31 in), while females reach 6.5 millimetres (0.26 in).
