= Cirolanides =

Scientific classification
- Kingdom: Animalia
- Phylum: Arthropoda
- Clade: Pancrustacea
- Class: Malacostraca
- Order: Isopoda
- Family: Cirolanidae
- Genus: Cirolanides; Benedict, 1896

Genus of crustaceans

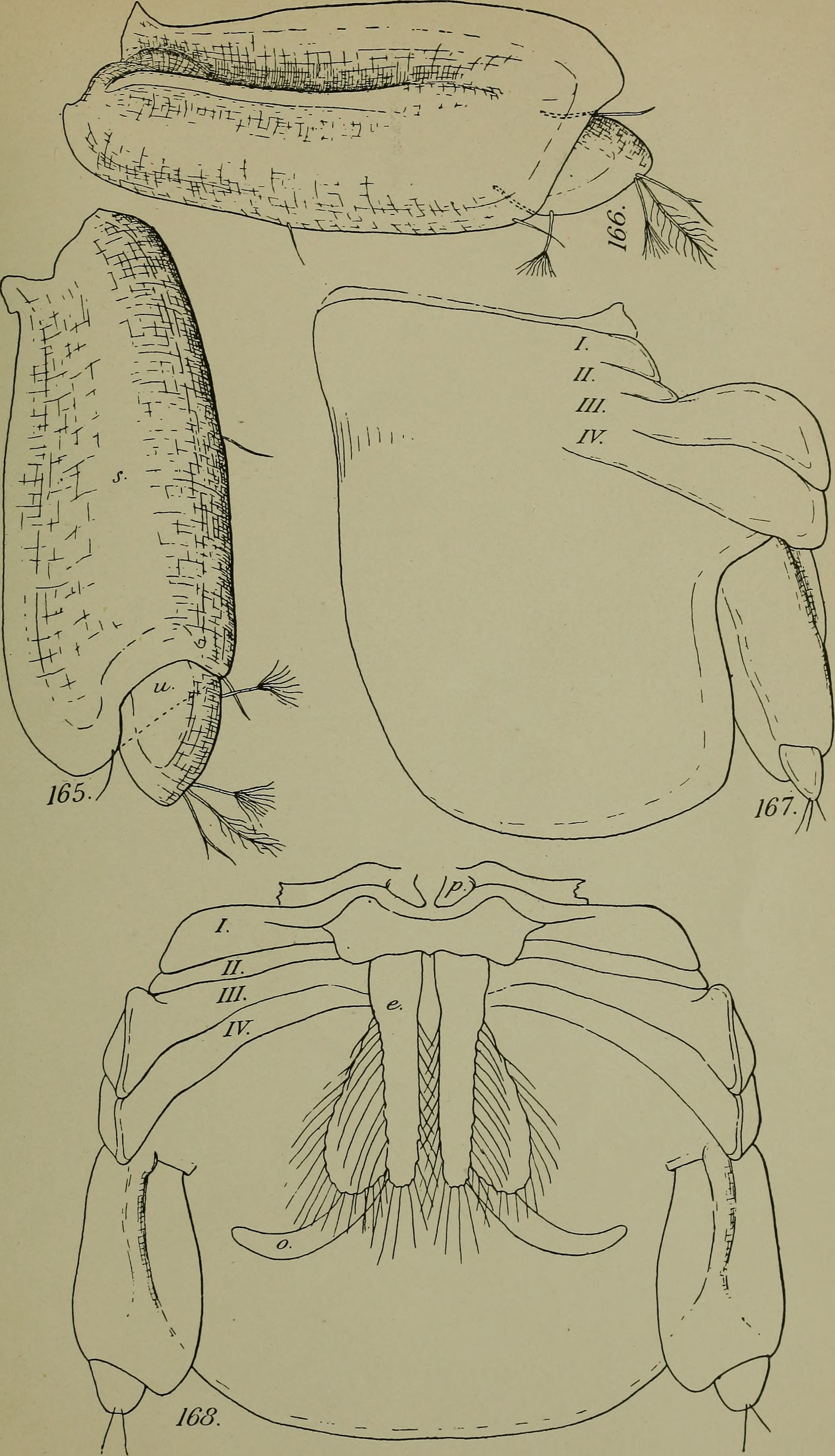
Drawings of Cirolanides by Emil Racovita (1912).

Cirolanides is a genus of isopods in the family Cirolanidae.

== Description ==
Members of Cirolanides do not have eyes. The base of the antennule has three segments and an elongated flagellum. The base of the antennae has five segments. The first pair of pereopods is strongly prehensile, with the other six pairs being more slender and ambulatory.

== Species ==
Cirolanides contains the following two species:

- Cirolanides texensis Benedict, 1896
- Cirolanides wassenichae Schwartz, Hutchins, Schwartz, Hess & Bonett, 2019
