= Odysseylana =

Scientific classification
- Kingdom: Animalia
- Phylum: Arthropoda
- Class: Malacostraca
- Order: Isopoda
- Family: Cirolanidae
- Genus: Odysseylana; Malyutina, 1995

Species
- Odysseylana sirenkoi; Odysseylana setosa; Odysseylana sakijang; Odysseylana temasek

Synonyms
- Parilcirolana Yu & Li, 2001

Genus of crustaceans

Odysseylana is a genus of marine isopod crustaceans in the family Cirolanidae, typically found in shallow waters in the Western Pacific, especially from Singapore and off Macau. It was initially described as a monotypic genus by Malyutina in 1995, and later expanded to include additional species, including two discovered in Singapore during a comprehensive marine biodiversity survey.

== Taxonomy ==
The genus Odysseylana was established by Malyutina in 1995 with the description of the type species, Odysseylana sirenkoi, from off southern Vietnam. The genus was revised in 2015 by Sidabalok and Bruce, who described two new species from Singapore: Odysseylana sakijang and Odysseylana temasek. They also synonymized the genus Parilcirolana with Odysseylana, thus renaming Parilcirolana setosa as Odysseylana setosa.

=== Species ===
As of the latest revision, Odysseylana includes four recognized species:

The recognized species were found in the locations below:

- Odysseylana sirenkoi Malyutina, 1995 – South China Sea, off Vietnam
- Odysseylana setosa Yu & Li, 2001 – Beibu Gulf to northern South China Sea
- Odysseylana sakijang Sidabalok & Bruce, 2015 – Singapore
- Odysseylana temasek Sidabalok & Bruce, 2015 – Singapore

== Description ==
Members of the genus Odysseylana are characterized by:

- An elongate body (2.9–3.5 times as long as wide)
- A head without a rostral point
- A pentagonal and flat frontal lamina
- Short first three antennal peduncle articles with longer fourth and fifth articles
- A quadrate pleopod 1 peduncle and a slender pleopod 1 endopod

== Distribution ==
Thus far, Odysseylana species are only found exclusively in the western Pacific Ocean, from Singapore to the South China Sea near Macau. They have not been recorded in better-documented marine faunas such as those of Australia or South Africa.

== Ecology and behaviour ==
Ecological and behavioural studies are lacking for members of the genus Odysseylana.
