= Colopisthus =

Scientific classification
- Kingdom: Animalia
- Phylum: Arthropoda
- Class: Malacostraca
- Order: Isopoda
- Family: Cirolanidae
- Genus: Colopisthus; Richardson, 1902

Genus of crustaceans

Colopisthus is a genus of isopods belonging to the family Cirolanidae.

The species of this genus are found in Central America.

Species:

- Colopisthus canna Moore & Brusca, 2003
- Colopisthus cavalier Moore & Brusca, 2003
- Colopisthus parvus Richardson, 1902
- Colopisthus ronrico Moore & Brusca, 2003
- Colopisthus tresesquinas Moore & Brusca, 2003
