= Mexilana =

Conservation status
- Vulnerable (IUCN 2.3)

Scientific classification
- Kingdom: Animalia
- Phylum: Arthropoda
- Class: Malacostraca
- Order: Isopoda
- Family: Cirolanidae
- Genus: Mexilana; Bowman, 1975
- Species: M. saluposi

Binomial name
- Mexilana saluposi Bowman, 1975

Genus of crustaceans

Mexilana saluposi is a species of crustacean in the family Cirolanidae, the only species in the genus Mexilana. It is endemic to Mexico.
