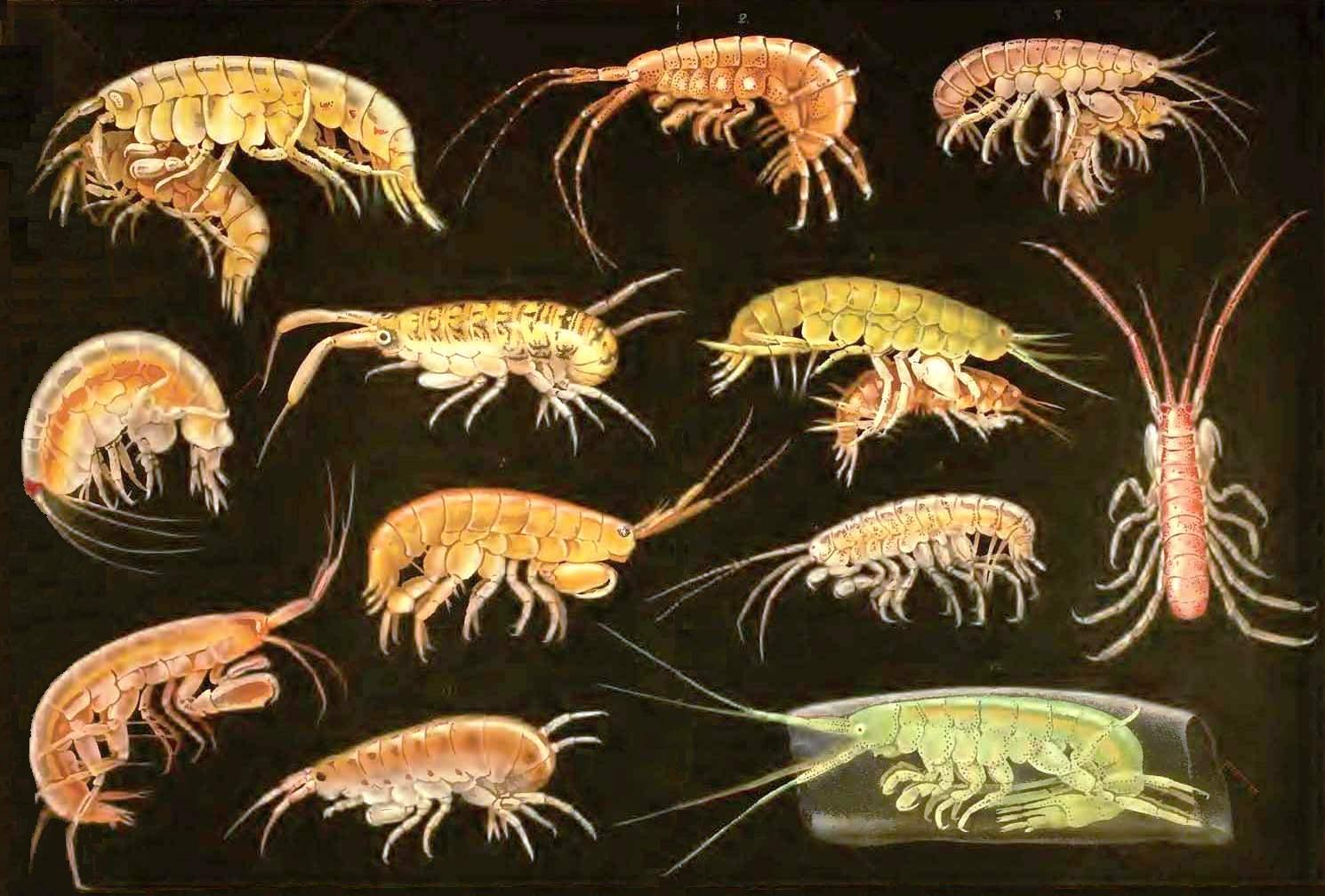
- Gammarid amphipods from the Gulf of Naples

Scientific classification
- Kingdom: Animalia
- Phylum: Arthropoda
- Clade: Pancrustacea
- Class: Malacostraca
- Subclass: Eumalacostraca
- Superorder: Peracarida; Calman, 1904

= Peracarida =

Peracarida Temporal range: upper Devonian–present, 365–0 Ma

Order of crustaceans

The superorder Peracarida (Note: New Latin; from Greek pēra (pouch, bag) + New Latin -carida (from Latin carid-, caris, a kind of sea crab)) is a large group of malacostracan crustaceans, having members in marine, freshwater, and terrestrial habitats. They are chiefly defined by the presence of a marsupium (the "brood pouch"), formed from thin flattened plates (oostegites) borne on the basalmost segments of the legs.

Peracarida is one of the largest crustacean taxa and includes about 12,000 species. Most members are less than 2 cm (0.8 in) in length, but the largest can be quite sizeable, such as the giant isopod Bathynomus giganteus which can reach 76 cm (30 in) in length, and the giant amphipod Alicella gigantea (34 cm (13 in) long). The earliest known peracaridian was Oxyuropoda ligioides, a fossil taxon dated to the Late Devonian of Ireland (more than 360 mya).

== Description ==
Generalized peracarid mandibula (Note: 1. Molar process; 2. Spine row; 3. Lacinia mobilis; 4. Incisor process; 5. Palp)

The defining characteristics of the order includes the possession of a single pair of maxillipeds (rarely 2–3), mandibles with an articulated accessory process between the molar and incisor "teeth" in the adults (called the lacinia mobilis), and of carapace which is often reduced in size and is not fused with the posterior thoracic somites. In some orders, the young hatch at a post-larval, prejuvenile stage called a manca which lacks the last pair of legs.

=== Marsupium ===
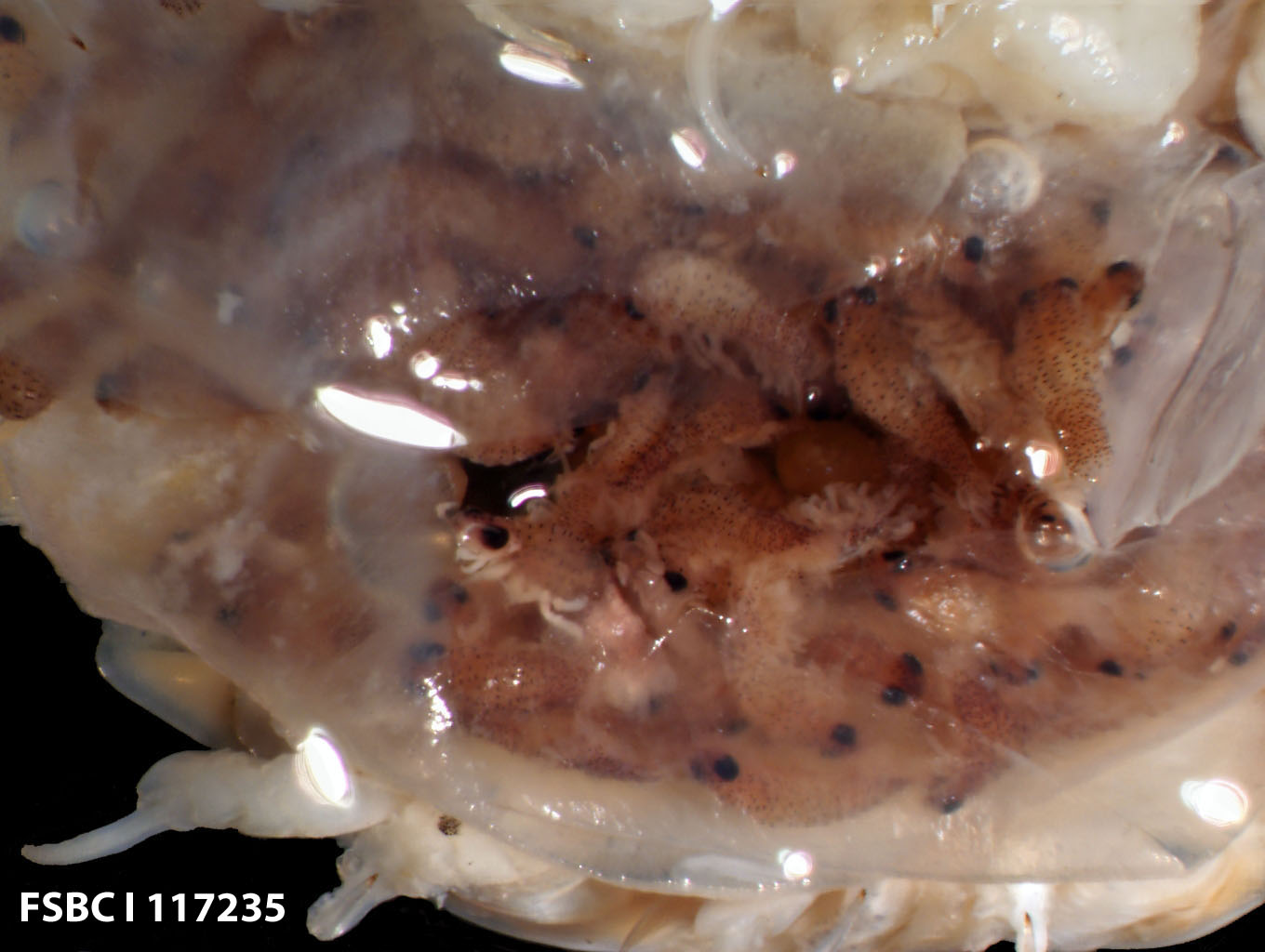
Livoneca redmanii; Cymothoidae, young in brood pouch

The marsupium of female peracaridans is a characteristic unique to this group (though males lack this part of their anatomy). It is a space on the ventral surface of the animal which functions as a brood pouch, and is enclosed by the large, flexible oostegites, which are bristly flaps (sometimes defined as lamellae) which extend from the basal segments of the pereiopods (the "hip" or coxae), which form the floor of a chamber "roofed" by the animal's sternum. This chamber is where the eggs are brooded; females lay their eggs directly into the brood chamber, and the young will develop there, undergoing several moults before emerging as miniature adults referred to as mancae; the larval development is direct in most cases.

In the underground order Thermosbaenacea, there are no oostegites and the carapace of the female is expanded to form a dorsal marsupium.

=== Manca ===
Mancae (sing. manca) (Note: Derived from Latin mancus, meaning "defective, imperfect.") are the post-larval stage or juvenile of the clade Mancoida which comprises all the members of the Peracarida except the Mysidacea and the Amphipoda. Mancae closely resemble the adult form, though have not yet developed the last pair of pereiopods. In some isopods, specifically the family Gnathiidae, the manca stage is a parasite of fish, and is also known as the praniza.

== Classification ==
=== Taxonomy ===
There is some disagreement as to which orders should be included within Peracarida. The World Register of Marine Species WoRMS (2023) includes the following 13 orders:

- Amphipoda Latreille, 1816 (scuds, sandhoppers, skeleton shrimp, whale lice, etc.)
- Bochusacea Gutu & Iliffe, 1998
- Cumacea Krøyer, 1846
- Ingolfiellida Hansen, 1903
- Isopoda Latreille, 1817 (woodlice, gribbles, tongue lice, etc.)
- Lophogastrida Sars, 1870
- Mictacea Bowman et al., 1985
- Mysida Haworth, 1825 (opossum shrimp)
- †Pygocephalomorpha Beurlen, 1930
- Spelaeogriphacea Gordon, 1957
- Stygiomysida Tchindonova, 1981
- Tanaidacea Dana, 1849
- Thermosbaenacea Monod, 1927

Of these Bochusacea, Ingolfiellida and Stygiomysida were added to the classification of Martin & Davies (2001). Ruppert et al. (2004) excluded Thermosbaenacea and placed it in a separate order, Pancarida. They also still kept Lophogastrida, Mysida and Pygocephalomorpha in a single order Mysidacea, an arrangement that was disputed by Meland and Willassen (2007) since molecular data shows that the three orders are not closely related (they do not form a clade).

=== Phylogeny ===
Cladogram after Barta et al. 2026 showing the internal and external relationships of Peracarida. The position of Thermosbaenacea varied depending on the analysis, being either the basalmost peracarids or a sister group to the derived Amphipoda + Ingolfiellida. Peracarids here are recovered in the traditional Caridoida (Eumalacostraca) as the sister group to Decapoda, as opposed to other studies where they are sister to Decapoda + Hoplocarida.

- Malacostraca
  - Leptostraca
  - - Hoplocarida
    - Caridoida
      - Syneucarida
        - Bathynellacea
        - - - Anaspidacea
            - Euphausiacea
          - Decapoda
      - Peracarida
        - ?Thermosbaenacea
        - - Mysidacea
            - Stygiomysida
            - - Lophogastrida
              - Mysida
          - - - ?Thermosbaenacea
              - - Ingolfiellida
                - Amphipoda
            - Mancoida
              - Spelaeogriphacea
              - - Mictacea
                - - Tanaidacea
                  - - Cumacea
                    - Isopoda
