= Sphaerolana =

Scientific classification
- Kingdom: Animalia
- Phylum: Arthropoda
- Clade: Pancrustacea
- Class: Malacostraca
- Order: Isopoda
- Family: Cirolanidae
- Genus: Sphaerolana; Cole & W. L. Minckley, 1970

Type species
- Sphaerolana interstitialis Cole & Minckley, 1970

Genus of crustaceans

Sphaerolana is a genus of isopod crustaceans in the family Cirolanidae, all of which are endemic to Mexico.

The genus Sphaerolana contains the following species:

- Sphaerolana affinis Cole & W. L. Minckley, 1970 –
- Sphaerolana interstitialis Cole & W. L. Minckley, 1970 –
- Sphaerolana karenae Rodriguez-Almaraz & Bowman, 1995 –

All three species are on the IUCN Red List as either vulnerable species (VU) or endangered species (EN).
