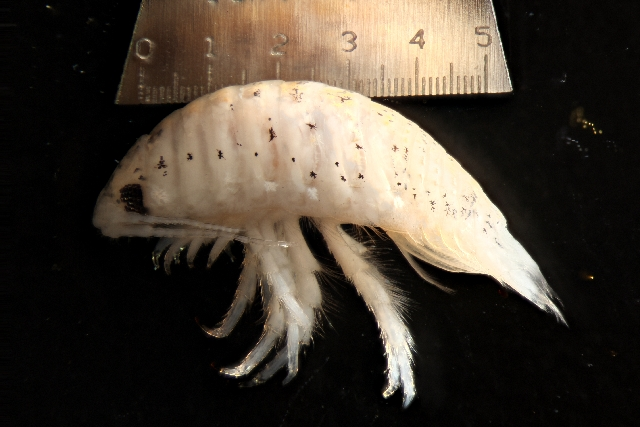
- Excirolana chiltoni

Scientific classification
- Kingdom: Animalia
- Phylum: Arthropoda
- Class: Malacostraca
- Order: Isopoda
- Family: Cirolanidae
- Genus: Excirolana; H. Richardson, 1912

= Excirolana =

Genus of crustaceans

Excirolana is a genus of isopods in the family Cirolanidae. There are about 15 described species in Excirolana.

== Species ==
- Excirolana affinis (Jones, 1971)
- Excirolana argentinae (Giambiagi, 1931)
- Excirolana armata (Dana, 1853)
- Excirolana braziliensis H. Richardson, 1912
- Excirolana chamensis Brusca & Weinberg, 1987
- Excirolana chilensis Richardson, 1912A
- Excirolana chiltoni (H. Richardson, 1905)
- Excirolana geniculata Jones, 1971
- Excirolana hirsuticauda Menzies, 1962A
- Excirolana latipes (Barnard, 1914B)
- Excirolana linguifrons (H. Richardson, 1899)
- Excirolana mayana (Ives, 1891)
- Excirolana monodi Carvacho, 1977
- Excirolana natalensis (Vanhoffen, 1914)
- Excirolana orientalis (Dana, 1853)
