= Mexistenasellus =

Scientific classification
- Kingdom: Animalia
- Phylum: Arthropoda
- Clade: Pancrustacea
- Class: Malacostraca
- Order: Isopoda
- Suborder: Asellota
- Superfamily: Aselloidea
- Family: Stenasellidae
- Genus: Mexistenasellus; Cole & W. L. Minckley, 1972

Genus of crustaceans

Mexistenasellus is a genus of isopod crustaceans in the family Stenasellidae.

== Species ==
The genus contains eight species, of which 4 are listed as endangered or vulnerable on the IUCN Red List.

- Mexistenasellus atotonoztok Álvarez & Guillén-Servent, 2016
- Mexistenasellus coahuila Cole & W. L. Minckley, 1972 –
- Mexistenasellus colei Bowman, 1982
- Mexistenasellus floridensis Lewis & Sawicki, 2016
- Mexistenasellus magniezi Argano, 1973
- Mexistenasellus nulemex Bowman, 1982 –
- Mexistenasellus parzefalli Magniez, 1972 –
- Mexistenasellus wilkensi Magniez, 1972 –

Mexistenasellus coahuila lives in Texas and Mexico, while Mexistenasellus floridensis is found in Florida. The other species are endemic to Mexico.
