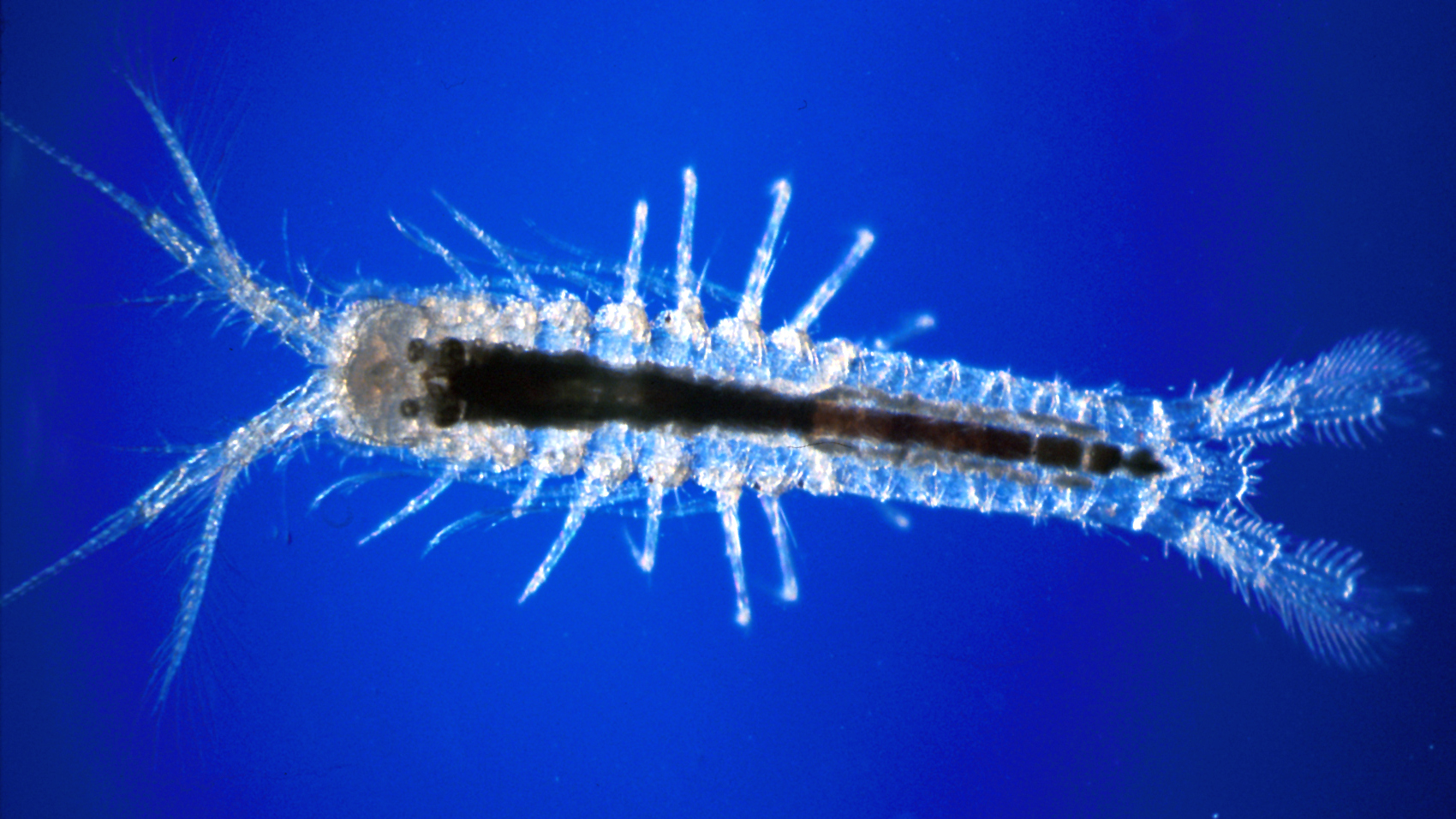
- Mictocaris halope

Conservation status
- Critically Endangered (IUCN 3.1)

Scientific classification
- Kingdom: Animalia
- Phylum: Arthropoda
- Class: Malacostraca
- Order: Mictacea
- Family: Mictocarididae; Bowman & Iliffe, 1985
- Genus: Mictocaris; Bowman & Iliffe, 1985
- Species: M. halope

Binomial name
- Mictocaris halope Bowman & Iliffe, 1985

= Mictocaris =

Genus of crustaceans

Mictocaris halope is the only species of cave crustacean in the monotypic genus Mictocaris. It is placed in its own family, Mictocarididae, and is sometimes considered the only member of the order Mictacea. Mictocaris is endemic to anchialine caves in Bermuda, and grows up to 3.5 mm (0.14 in) long. Its biology is poorly known.

== Taxonomy ==
Mictocaris halope is the only species in the genus Mictocaris, and in the family Mictocarididae. When the family Hirsutiidae is treated as the separate order Bochusacea, Mictocaris halope is the only species that remains in the order Mictacea.

== Description ==
Mictocaris is 3.0–3.5 millimetres (0.12–0.14 in) long and is reflective. It is native to four anchialine limestone caves in Bermuda: it was first discovered by divers in Crystal Cave, and then further populations were found in Green Bay Cave (South Harrington Sound Passage and North Shore Passage), Roadside Cave and Tucker's Town Cave.

== Ecology ==
Mictocaris is rarely encountered because it lives only in deep waters in the interior sections of the caves. It avoids sunlight and remains in isolated parts of the cave. It is usually seen swimming, but on rare occasions can be found resting or walking on a rock. When relocated into an aquarium, they prefer the walls and surfaces of the glass. It is unknown what Mictocaris eats, but it has developed powerful molar and mandible muscles which allows them to chew productively. When originally found, the divers collected 56 specimens of Mictocaris, which can now be found in the National Museum of Natural History.

== Conservation ==
Mictocaris is critically endangered due to population fragmentation, a decline in subpopulations, and only inhabiting a single location. The population is only extant in five locations, some of which are likely experiencing habitat destruction.
