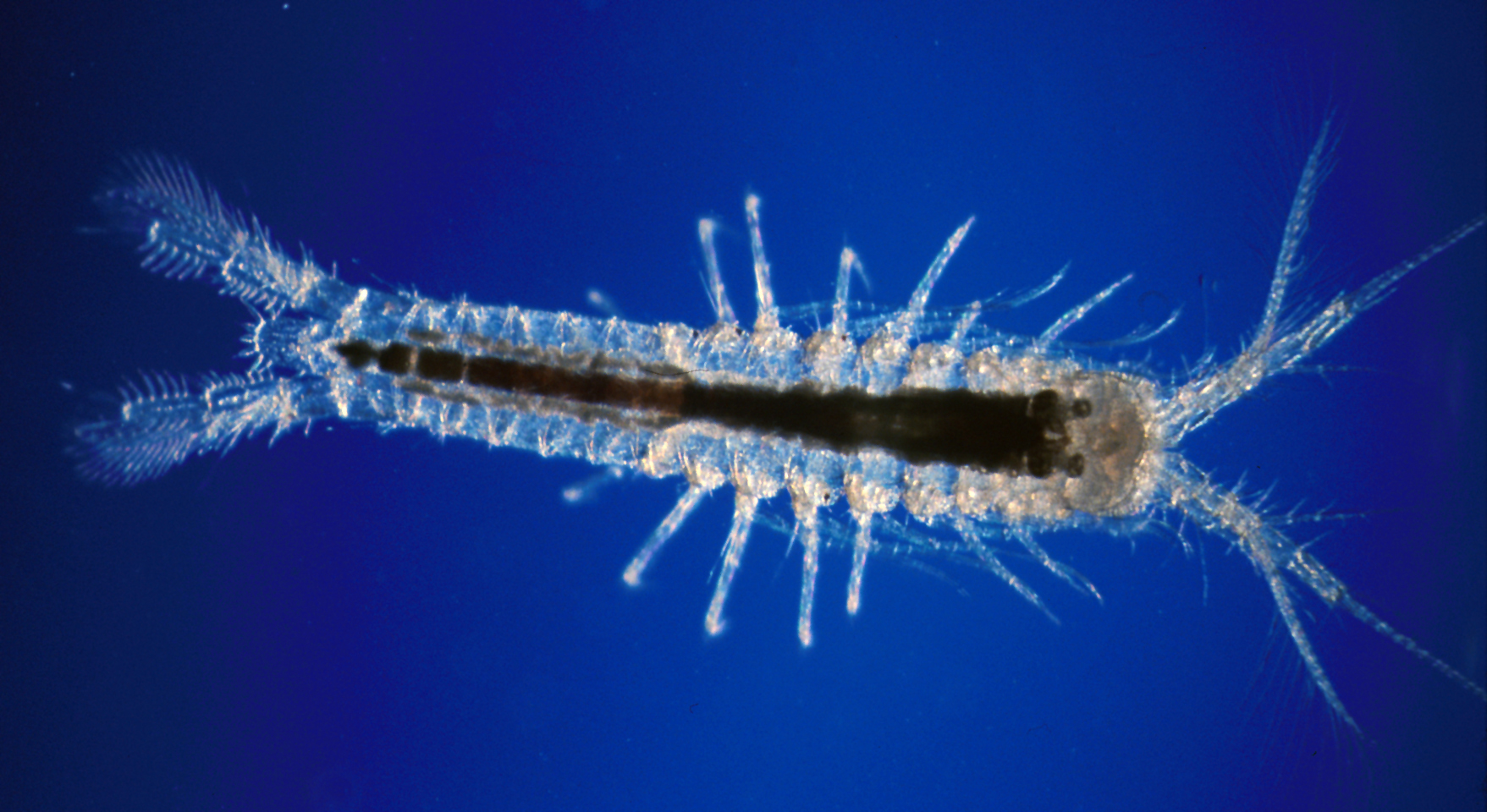
- Mictocaris halope

Scientific classification
- Kingdom: Animalia
- Phylum: Arthropoda
- Class: Malacostraca
- Superorder: Peracarida
- Order: Mictacea; Bowman, Garner, Hessler, Iliffe & Sanders, 1985

Families
- Mictocarididae

= Mictacea =

Order of crustaceans

Mictacea is a monotypic order of crustaceans. It was originally erected for three species of small shrimp-like animals of the deep sea and anchialine caves. They were placed in two families, the Mictocarididae and Hirsutiidae, but Hirsutiidae is now placed in order Bochusacea, leaving Mictacea with a single species, Mictocaris halope.

== Description ==
Mictaceans have a brood pouch (marsupium) and biramous thoracic limbs, but lack a carapace. They have eyestalks but "no functioning visual elements".

== History ==
The existence of animals resembling the Mictacea had been predicted by Frederick Schram in the early 1980s. Two groups of scientists independently discovered the animals in 1985, and, once they learnt of each other's work, agreed to work together on the paper describing the new order.

== Species ==
A single species is recognised:

Mictocarididae Bowman & Iliffe, 1985

- Mictocaris Bowman & Iliffe, 1985
  - Mictocaris halope Bowman & Iliffe, 1985
