= Speocirolana =

Scientific classification
- Kingdom: Animalia
- Phylum: Arthropoda
- Class: Malacostraca
- Order: Isopoda
- Family: Cirolanidae
- Genus: Speocirolana; Bolivar y Pieltain, 1950

Genus of crustaceans

Speocirolana is a genus of crustacean in family Cirolanidae. They occur in Mexico from San Luis Potosi northwards and in southern Texas (United States). They are stygobionts. They measure 17–33 mm (0.67–1.30 in) in total length.

== Species ==
Speocirolana contains the following species:

- Speocirolana bolivari (Rioja, 1953)
- Speocirolana disparicornis Botosaneanu & Iliffe, 1999
- Speocirolana endeca Bowman, 1982
- Speocirolana fustiura Botosaneanu & Illife, 1999
- Speocirolana guerrei Contreras-Balderas & Purata Velarde, 1982
- Speocirolana hardeni Bowman, 1992
- Speocirolana lapenita Botosaneanu & Iliffe, 1999
- Speocirolana pelaezi Bolivar y Pieltain, 1950
- Speocirolana prima Schotte, 2002
- Speocirolana pubens Bowman, 1982
- Speocirolana thermydronis Cole & W. L. Minckley, 1966
- Speocirolana xilitla Alvarez & Villalobos, 2008
- Speocirolana zumbadora Botosaneanu, Iliffe & Hendrickson, 1998
