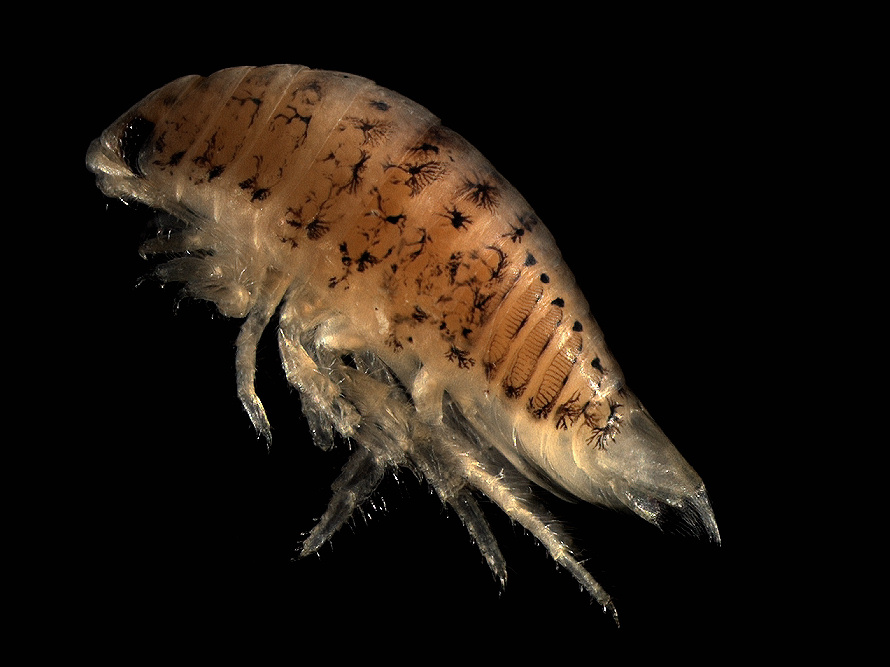
- Eurydice pulchra

Scientific classification
- Kingdom: Animalia
- Phylum: Arthropoda
- Class: Malacostraca
- Order: Isopoda
- Family: Cirolanidae
- Genus: Eurydice; Leach, 1815

Species
- See text

= Eurydice (crustacean) =

Genus of crustaceans

Eurydice is a genus of isopod crustaceans named after the mythical Eurydice, wife of the musician Orpheus. It includes the following species:

- Eurydice acuticauda Bruce, 1981
- Eurydice affinis Hansen, 1905
- Eurydice agilis Jones, 1971
- Eurydice akiyamai Nunomura, 1981
- Eurydice arabica Jones, 1974
- Eurydice barnardi Bruce & Soares, 1996
- Eurydice binda Bruce, 1986
- Eurydice bowmani George & Longerbeam, 1998
- Eurydice caudata Richardson, 1899
- Eurydice cavicaudata Jones, 1971
- Eurydice chelifer Jones, 1971
- Eurydice clymeneia Monod, 1926
- Eurydice convexa Richardson, 1900
- Eurydice czerniavsky Bacescu, 1948
- Eurydice dollfusi Monod, 1930
- Eurydice elongata Moreira, 1972
- Eurydice emarginata Moreira, 1972
- Eurydice grimaldii Dollfus, 1888
- Eurydice humilis Stebbing, 1910
- Eurydice indicis Eleftheriou & Jones, 1976
- Eurydice inermis Hansen, 1890
- Eurydice inornata Jones, 1971
- Eurydice kensleyi Bruce & Soares, 1996
- Eurydice littoralis (Moore, 1901)
- Eurydice longiantennata Nunomura & Ikehara, 1985
- Eurydice longicornis (Studer)
- Eurydice longipes Jones, 1971
- Eurydice longispina Jones, 1969
- Eurydice lusitanica Jones & Pierpoint, 1997
- Eurydice mauritanica de Grave & Jones, 1991
- Eurydice minya Bruce, 1986
- Eurydice naylori Jones & Pierpoint, 1997
- Eurydice nipponica Bruce & Jones, 1981
- Eurydice orientalis Hansen, 1890
- Eurydice paxilli Schotte & Kensley, 2005
- Eurydice peraticis Jones, 1974
- Eurydice personata Kensley, 1987
- Eurydice piperata Menzies & Frankenberg, 1966
- Eurydice pontica (Czerniavsky, 1868)
- Eurydice pulchra Leach, 1815
- Eurydice racovitzai Bacescu, 1949
- Eurydice rotundicauda Norman, 1906
- Eurydice saikaiensis Nunomura, 2008
- Eurydice spenceri Bruce, 1981B
- Eurydice spinigera Hansen, 1890
- Eurydice subtruncata Tattersall, 1921
- Eurydice tarti Bruce, 1986
- Eurydice truncata (Norman, 1868)
- Eurydice valkanovi Bacescu, 1949
- Eurydice woka Bruce, 1986
- Eurydice wyuna Bruce, 1986
