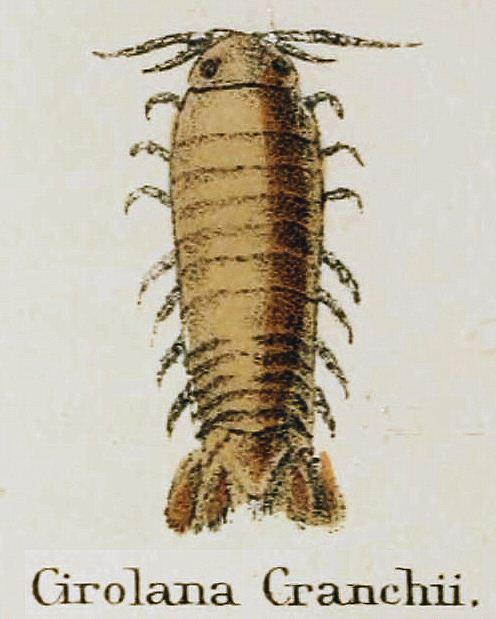
- Cirolana cranchii, the type species

Scientific classification
- Kingdom: Animalia
- Phylum: Arthropoda
- Class: Malacostraca
- Order: Isopoda
- Family: Cirolanidae
- Genus: Cirolana; Leach, 1818

Species
- See text

= Cirolana =

Genus of crustaceans

Cirolana is a genus of isopod crustaceans.

== Names ==
Some of the species are named for people, as C. brucei for zoologist Niel L. Bruce, who has named many isopods; C. mercuryi for musician Freddie Mercury; C. cranchii for explorer John Cranch, a friend and employee of William Elford Leach who first described the genus in 1818. The generic name Cirolana is an anagram of Carolina, named for an unknown woman called Caroline. Leach named a number of isopod genera with anagrams of Caroline or Carolina. In the French work in which Leach proposed these names he gave each new genus a French name as well as a Latin zoological name. Sometimes - as with Cirolana - it was the French name that was the anagram of Caroline; in this case 'Cirolane'.

== Species ==
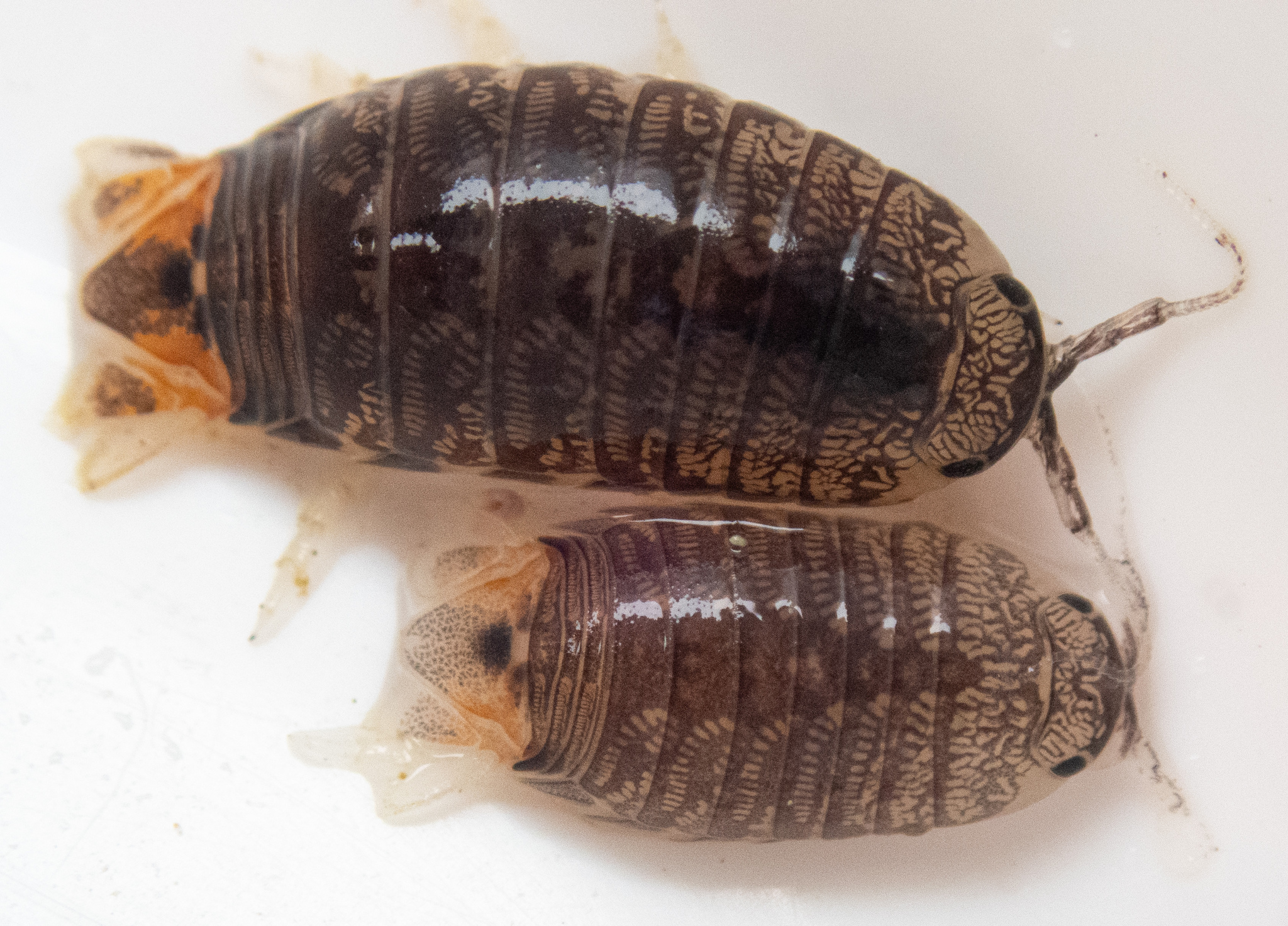
Cirolana harfordi

Cirolana includes the following species:

Subgenus Cirolana (Anopsilana) Leach, 1818

- Cirolana acanthura (Notenboom, 1981)
- Cirolana aleci (Brusca, Wetzer & France, 1995)
- Cirolana barnardi (Bruce, 1992)
- Cirolana browni (Van Name, 1936)
- Cirolana conditoria (Bruce & Iliffe, 1993)
- Cirolana crenata (Bowman & Franz, 1982)
- Cirolana cubensis (Hay, 1903)
- Cirolana hirsuta (Yasmeen, 2005)
- Cirolana jonesi (Kensley, 1987)
- Cirolana lingua (Bowman & Iliffe, 1987)
- Cirolana luciae (Barnard, 1940)
- Cirolana magna (Ortiz, Lalana & Perez, 1997)
- Cirolana marosina Botosaneanu, 2003
- Cirolana oaxaca (Carvacho & Haasmann, 1984)
- Cirolana pleocissa (Botosaneanu & Iliffe, 1997)
- Cirolana poissoni (Paulian & Delamare Deboutteville, 1956)
- Cirolana pustulosa (Hale, 1925)
- Cirolana radicicola (Notenboom, 1981)
- Cirolana sinu (Kensley & Schotte, 1994)
- Cirolana willeyi (Stebbing, 1904)

(main genus)

- Cirolana albida Richardson, 1901
- Cirolana albidoida Kensley & Schotte, 1987
- Cirolana aldabrensis Schotte & Kensley, 2005
- Cirolana arafurae Bruce, 1986
- Cirolana australiense Hale, 1925
- Cirolana australis Keable, 2001
- Cirolana avida Nunomura, 1988
- Cirolana bougaardti Kensley, 1984
- Cirolana bovina Barnard, 1940
- Cirolana brocha Bruce, 1986
- Cirolana brucei Javed & Yasmeen, 1995
- Cirolana bruscai Bruce & Olesen, 2002
- Cirolana canaliculata Tattersall, 1921
- Cirolana capricornica Bruce, 1986
- Cirolana carina Jones, 1976
- Cirolana carinata Yu & Li, 2001
- Cirolana chalotiBouvier, 1901
- Cirolana cingulata Barnard, 1920
- Cirolana comata Keable, 2001
- Cirolana cooma Bruce, 1986
- Cirolana coronata Bruce & Jones, 1981
- Cirolana corrugis Jones, 1976
- Cirolana cranchii Leach, 1818
- Cirolana crenulitelson Kensley & Schotte, 1987
- Cirolana cristata Bruce, 1994
- Cirolana curtensis Bruce, 1986
- Cirolana diminuta Menzies, 1962
- Cirolana dissimilis Keable, 2001
- Cirolana enigma Wieder & Feldmann, 1992 †
- Cirolana epimerias Richardson, 1910
- Cirolana erodiae Bruce, 1986
- Cirolana fabianii de Angeli & Rossi, 2006 †
- Cirolana fernandezmileraiOrtiz, Lalana &Varela, 2007
- Cirolana ferruginosa Risso, 1826
- Cirolana fluviatilis Stebbing, 1902
- Cirolana furcata Bruce, 1981
- Cirolana garuwa Bruce, 1986
- Cirolana glebula Bruce, 1994
- Cirolana grumula Bruce, 1994
- Cirolana halei Bruce, 1981
- Cirolana harfordi (Lockington, 1877)
- Cirolana hesperia Bruce, 1986
- Cirolana imposita Barnard, 1955
- Cirolana improceros Bruce, 1986
- Cirolana incisicauda Barnard, 1940
- Cirolana indica Nierstrasz, 1931
- Cirolana kendi Bruce, 1986
- Cirolana kiliani Müller, 1993
- Cirolana kokoru Bruce, 2004
- Cirolana kombona Bruce, 1986
- Cirolana lata Haswell, 1882
- Cirolana leptanga Bruce, 1994
- Cirolana lignicola Nunomura, 1984
- Cirolana littoralis Barnard, 1920
- Cirolana magdalaina Bruce, 1980
- Cirolana makikihi Feldmann, Schweitzer, Maxwell & Kelley, 2008 †
- Cirolana manorae Bruce & Javed, 1987
- Cirolana mascarensis Müller, 1991
- Cirolana mclaughlinae Bruce & Brandt, 2006
- Cirolana meinerti Barnard, 1920
- Cirolana mekista Bruce, 1986
- Cirolana mercuryi Bruce, 2004
- Cirolana meseda Hobbins & Jones, 1993
- Cirolana mimulus Schotte & Kensley, 2005
- Cirolana minuta Hansen, 1890
- Cirolana morilla Bruce, 1986
- Cirolana namelessensis Brusca, Wetzer & France, 1995
- Cirolana nielbrucei Brusca, Wetzer & France, 1995
- Cirolana oreonota Bruce, 1986
- Cirolana palifrons Barnard, 1920
- Cirolana paraerodiae Müller & Salvat, 1993
- Cirolana parva Hansen, 1890
- Cirolana perlata Barnard, 1936
- Cirolana pilosa Yu & Li, 2001
- Cirolana pleonastica Stebbing, 1900
- Cirolana portula Bruce, 1986
- Cirolana quechso Bruce, 2004
- Cirolana rachanoi Bruce & Olesen, 2002
- Cirolana repigrata Bruce, 1994
- Cirolana rugicauda Heller, 1861
- Cirolana sadoensis Nunomura, 1981
- Cirolana saldanhae Barnard, 1951
- Cirolana similis Bruce, 1981
- Cirolana solitaria Bruce, 1986
- Cirolana somalia Schotte & Kensley, 2005
- Cirolana songkhla Rodcharoen, Bruce & Pholpunthin, 2014
- Cirolana stenoura Bruce, 1986
- Cirolana sulcata Hansen, 1890
- Cirolana sulcaticauda Stebbing, 1904
- Cirolana tarahomii Khalaji-Pirbalouty & Wägele, 2011
- Cirolana theleceps Barnard, 1940
- Cirolana transcostata Barnard, 1959
- Cirolana triloba Bruce, 1981
- Cirolana troglexuma Botosaneanu & Iliffe, 1997
- Cirolana tuberculata (Richardson, 1910)
- Cirolana tuberculosa Bruce, 1986
- Cirolana tumulosa Holdich, Harrison & Bruce, 1981
- Cirolana undata Schotte & Kensley, 2005
- Cirolana undulata Barnard, 1914
- Cirolana vanhoeffeni Nierstrasz, 1931
- Cirolana venusticauda Stebbing, 1902
- Cirolana vicina Barnard, 1914
- Cirolana victoriae Bruce, 1981
- Cirolana wongat Bruce, 1994
- Cirolana yucatana Botosaneanu & Iliffe, 2000
- Cirolana yunca (Botosaneanu & Iliffe, 2000)
