= Thomas Elliot Bowman III =

American carcinologist (1918–1995)

Thomas Elliot Bowman III (October 21, 1918 – August 10, 1995) was an American carcinologist noted for his studies of isopods and copepods.

Bowman was born and grew up in Brooklyn, New York. He graduated from Kent School in Kent, Connecticut in 1937 and Harvard College in 1941. During the Second World War, he spent four years in the U.S. Army, gaining a degree in veterinary medicine from the University of Pennsylvania. Afterwards, he went to the University of California, Berkeley, where he gained a master's degree, and then worked at the Scripps Institution of Oceanography, where he gained a Ph.D. (awarded by the University of California, Los Angeles).

During his career, Bowman wrote 163 papers, using a style which has been likened to that of Ernest Hemingway and Albert Camus. As well as describing 116 new species (including 55 isopods, 28 copepods, one suctorian and one chaetognath), 16 genera and one order, Mictacea, Bowman also produced significant works on the structural homology of the telson and the evolution of stalked eyes.

== Taxa ==
Several taxonomic names recognise Thomas Bowman:

- Apseudes bowmani Gutu & Iliffe, 1989
- Bahalana bowmani Ortiz & Lenana, 1997
- Cymbasoma bowmani Suárez-Morales & Gasca, 1998
- Halicyclops bowmani Da Rocha & Iliffe, 1993
- Hansenium bowmani (Kensley, 1984)

Taxa named by Bowman include:

- Antrolana Bowman, 1964
- Antrolana lira Bowman, 1964
- Bermudalana aruboides Bowman & Iliffe, 1983
- Dolobrotus mardeni T. E. Bowman, 1974
- Lirceus usdagalun Holsinger & Bowman, 1973
- Mexilana saluposi Bowman, 1975
- Mexistenasellus nulemex Bowman, 1982
- Mictacea Bowman, Garner, Hessler, Iliffe & Sanders, 1985
- Mictocarididae Bowman & Iliffe, 1985
- Mictocaris Bowman & Iliffe, 1985
- Mictocaris halope Bowman & Iliffe, 1985
- Remasellus Bowman & Sket, 1985
- Sphaerolana karenae Rodriguez-Almaraz & Bowman, 1995
- Thermosphaeroma cavicauda Bowman, 1985
- Thermosphaeroma macrura Bowman, 1985
- Thermosphaeroma milleri Bowman, 1981
- Thermosphaeroma smithi Bowman, 1981
