= John Cranch (naturalist) =

English naturalist and explorer

John Cranch (1785–1816) was an English naturalist and explorer.

== Explorer ==
John Cranch - 'Jack' to his friends - took part in an expedition in 1816 under Captain James Hingston Tuckey to discover the source of the River Congo, and died there.

== Legacy ==
His friend William Elford Leach named nineteen new species and one new genus after him in his description of the expedition. These include for example the marine isopod crustacean Cirolana cranchi which he named in 1818, and the shrimp Eualus cranchii in 1817.
