= William Elford Leach =

English zoologist and marine biologist (1790–1836)

- Born: 2 February 1790; Plymouth, Devon, England
- Died: 25 August 1836 (aged 46); San Sebastiano Curone, Italy
- Scientific career
- Fields: Natural history, entomology, marine biology
- Author abbrev. (zoology): Leach

William Elford Leach FRS (2 February 1790 – 25 August 1836) was an English zoologist and marine biologist.

== Life and work ==
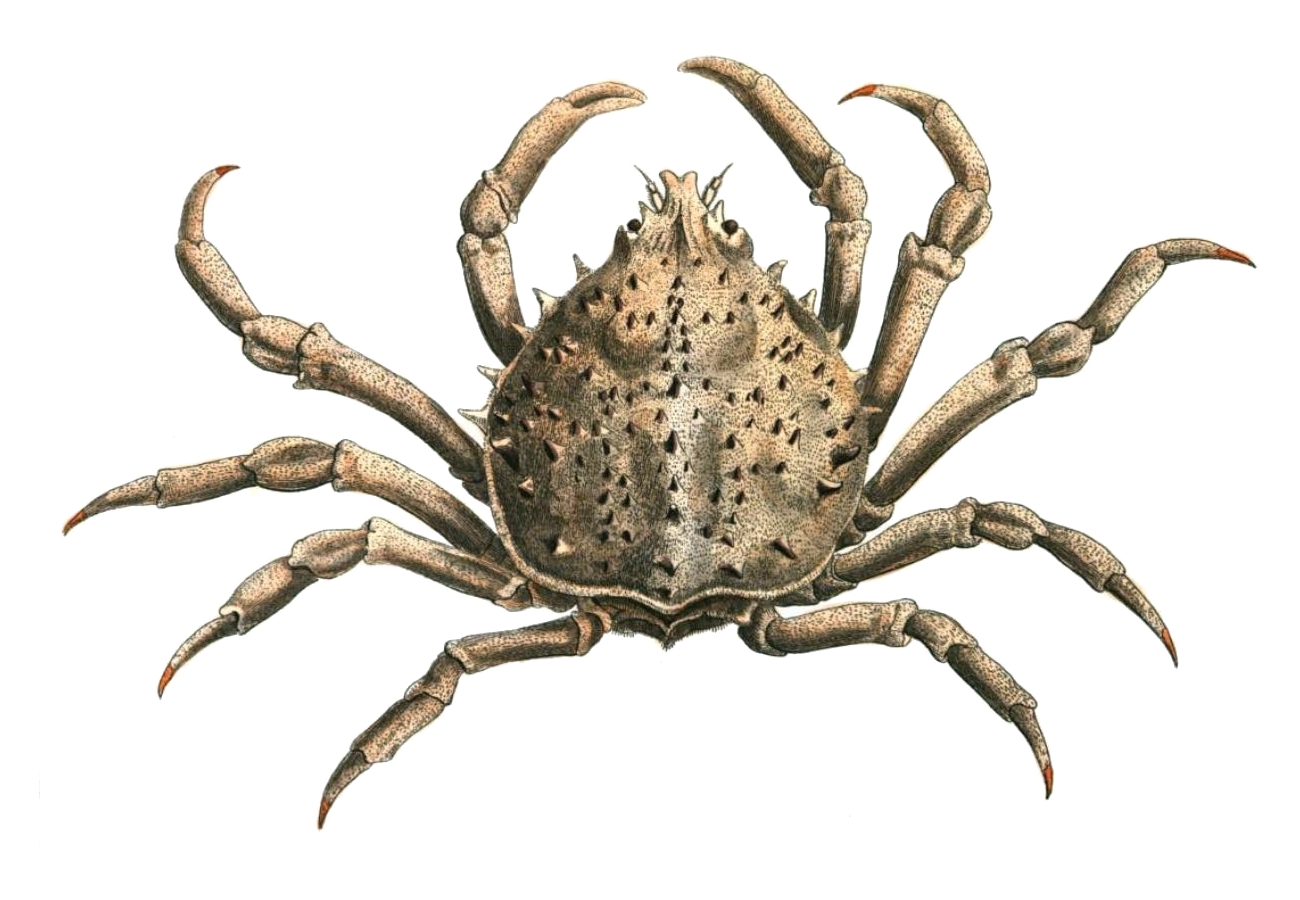
Libinia emarginata described by Leach in Zoological Miscellany in 1815.

Elford Leach was born at Hoe Gate, Plymouth, the son of an attorney, George Leach (1748–1823), a naturalist, and his wife Jenny Elford. At the age of twelve he began a medical apprenticeship at the Devon and Exeter Hospital, studying anatomy and chemistry. By this time he was already collecting marine animals from Plymouth Sound and along the Devon coast. At seventeen he began studying medicine at St Bartholomew's Hospital in London, finishing his training at the University of Edinburgh before graduating MD from the University of St Andrews (where he had never studied).

From 1813 Leach concentrated on his zoological interests and was employed as an 'Assistant Librarian' (what would later be called Assistant Keeper) in the Natural History Department of the British Museum, where he had responsibility for the zoological collections. Here he threw himself into the task of reorganising and modernising these collections, many of which had been neglected since Hans Sloane left them to the nation. In 1815, he published the first bibliography of entomology in Brewster's Edinburgh Encyclopedia (see Timeline of entomology – 1800–1850). He also worked and published on other invertebrates, amphibians, reptiles, mammals and birds. and was the naturalist who separated the centipedes and millipedes from the insects, giving them their own group, the Myriapoda. In his day he was the world's leading expert on the Crustacea and was in contact with scientists in the United States and throughout Europe. In 1816 he was elected a Fellow of the Royal Society at the age of 25.

== Death ==
In 1821, he suffered a nervous breakdown due to overwork and became unable to continue his researches. He resigned from the British Museum in March 1822 and his elder sister Jane took him to continental Europe to convalesce. They lived in Italy and (briefly) Malta and he died from cholera in San Sebastiano Curone, near Tortona, north of Genoa, on 25 August 1836.

== Legacy ==
In 1837, Dr Francis Boott, secretary of the Linnean Society of London, wrote, "Few men have ever devoted themselves to zoology with greater zeal than Dr Leach, or attained at an early period of life a higher reputation at home and abroad as a profound naturalist. He was one of the most laborious (Note: i.e. hard-working) and successful, as well as one of the most universal, cultivators of zoology which this country has ever produced."

Despite his expertise in particular animal groups, Leach's greatest contribution was his almost single-handed modernisation of the whole of British zoology following its stagnation during the long war with post-revolutionary and Napoleonic France.

In Britain zoologists remained committed to the system of animal classification introduced by Linnaeus in the middle of the 18th century. This was a powerful tool but its principles led to artificial groupings of species when creating larger groups such as genera and families. For example, Linnaeus had called all animals encased in a hard outer skeleton, insects. He therefore grouped butterflies with lobsters, scorpions, spiders and centipedes but these animals are not otherwise similar in appearance, do not live in the same environment, and do not behave in the same way. The grouping does separate animals with hard outer skeletons from jellyfish, worms, snails, vertebrates, etc. but does not produce a group 'Insecta' with clear similarities shared by all its members.

In continental Europe in the late 18th century naturalists began to revise the way they grouped species. They used a wider array of characters, not just one or two, and began to discern groups of species that physically resembled one another, lived in similar ways and occupied similar habitats. They created new genera to house these coherent groups and referred to these as 'natural genera'. They named this approach the 'natural method' or 'natural system' of classification.

Unlike many of his countrymen, Leach was aware of these developments across the English Channel. He read the French literature and, despite the war with France, corresponded with the zoologists in Paris. He applied the new principles to his own research and brought them to the attention of other British zoologists through his publications. Between the years 1813 and 1830 he produced more than 130 scientific articles and books. (Note: Harrison & Smith, pp. 553–564) By applying the natural method in these works he created more than 380 new genera, many of which have stood the test of time and remain valid today.

In 1834, at the annual meeting of the British Association for the Advancement of Science, Leonard Jenyns reported on The Recent Progress and Present State of Zoology. Discussing the science in the years before 1817 he noted the advances made on the Continent, then continued, 'England, we fear, has but little to produce as the result of her labours in zoology during the same period. Our countrymen were too much riveted to the principles of the Linnaean school to appreciate the value of the natural system ... There was a general repugnance to everything that appeared like an innovation on the system of Linnaeus; and for many years ... zoology, which was making rapid strides in France and other parts of the Continent, remained in this country nearly stationary. It is mainly to Dr Leach that we are indebted for having opened the eyes of English zoologists to the importance of those principles which had long guided the French naturalists. Whilst he greatly contributed to the advancement of the natural system by his own researches, he gave a turn to those of others, and made the first step towards weaning his countrymen from the school they had so long adhered to.'

Two years later, the year of Leach's death, the House of Commons completed a detailed investigation of the management of the British Museum. During their interviews the MPs had received confirmation from John Edward Gray that it was Leach who, "was the first to make the English acquainted, by his works and by his improved manner of arranging the collections of the Museum, with the progress that had been made in natural science on the Continent. Thus a new impetus was given to zoology". Edward Griffiths (translator of George Cuvier's Le Règne Animal) told the inquiry that in Britain, before Leach's work, "zoology was utterly neglected; 20 years ago it was anything but popular; certainly there were very few amateurs that paid much attention to it." "In your judgment," the committee proposed, "Dr Leach has the eminent credit of having raised the science of zoology in England?" "Indeed I think so" replied Griffiths.

In his short career Leach had brought British zoology back to the cutting edge of the subject and as a consequence had put the next generation of British zoologists on much firmer ground. The next generation of British zoologists contained both Charles Darwin and Alfred Russel Wallace. (Note: Charles Darwin was guided in his natural history researches by John Stevens Henslow. As a teenager Henslow had been tutored in zoology by Leach)

Despite his impact, today Elford Leach is remembered mainly in the scientific names of the many species that honour him. In the years up to 1850 alone 137 new species were named leachii, leachiana, leachella, elfordii, elfordiana and other variants.

Leach is commemorated in the scientific names of two species of lizards, Anolis leachii and Rhacodactylus leachianus.

In the non-scientific literature he is honoured in the common names of several species. Leach's storm-petrel was named after him by Coenraad Jacob Temminck in 1820 (Note: Temminck created the species Procellaria leachii but was unaware this species had already been described by Vieillot as P. leucorhoa. The first known British specimen of this bird had been purchased by Leach on behalf of the British Museum for £5 15s in the sale of the collection of William Bullock in 1819. At the same sale he also bought a great auk and an egg for just over £16.) and the blue-winged kookaburra, Dacelo leachii, is also known as Leach's kookaburra. Leach created the genus Dacelo for the kookaburras in 1815.

== Leach's nomenclature ==
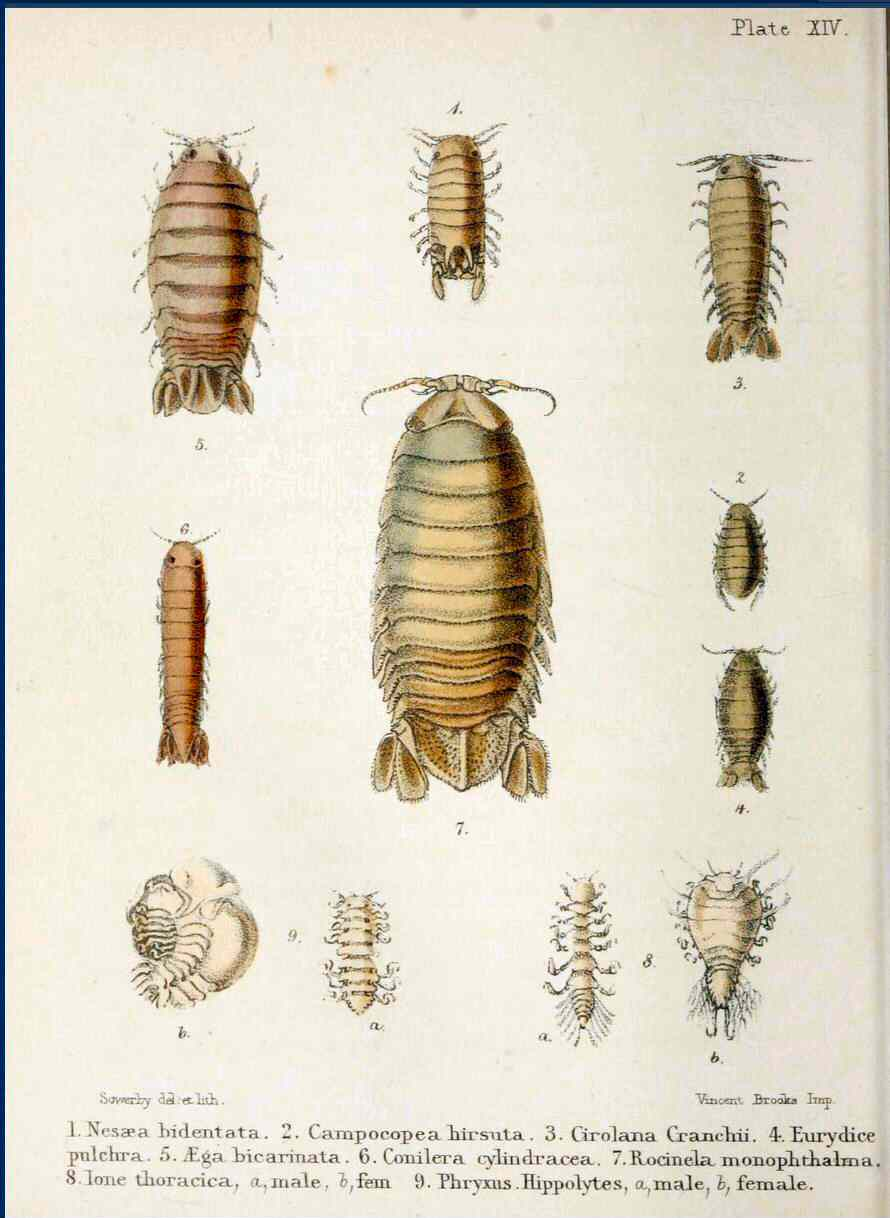
Illustration from Adam White's A Popular History of British Crustacea, 1857, showing three genera of crustacea named by Leach as anagrams of Carolina: Cirolana, Conilera and Rocinela

Leach's nomenclature was often personal – he named nineteen species and one genus after his employee and friend John Cranch, who had died while collecting the species in Africa on the expedition of HMS Congo. He named nine genera after an unknown woman called Caroline, using anagrams of that name and the Latinised form Carolina, for example: Cirolana, Conilera and Rocinela. These include the marine isopod crustacean Cirolana cranchi which he named in 1818 after both Caroline and Cranch. (Note: Other such genera include Nelocira. Many other genera created by Leach have classical names such as Hippolyte, Eurydice and Palaemon.)

== Bibliography ==
Leach's written works during his time at the British Museum include the following:

- The Zoological Miscellany (1814–1817)
- Monograph on the British Crabs, Lobsters, Prawns and other Crustacea with pedunculated eyes (1815–1820)
- Systematic catalogue of the Specimens of the Indigenous Mammalia and Birds that are preserved at the British Museum (1816)
- Synopsis of the Mollusca of Great Britain (circulated 1820, but not published until 1852) (Note: This book was dedicated to Marie Jules César Savigny, Georges Cuvier, and Giuseppe Saverio Poli and was posthumously completed by John Edward Gray)

== See also ==
- Category:Taxa named by William Elford Leach
