= Hirsutiidae =

Scientific classification
- Kingdom: Animalia
- Phylum: Arthropoda
- Clade: Pancrustacea
- Class: Malacostraca
- Order: Bochusacea; Gutu & Iliffe, 1998
- Family: Hirsutiidae; Sanders, Hessler & Garner, 1985

Genera
- Hirsutia Saunders, Hessler & Garner, 1985; Thetispelecaris Gutu & Iliffe, 1998; Montucaris Jaume, Boxshall & Bamber, 2006

Family of crustaceans

Hirsutiidae is a family of crustaceans, classified either as a separate order, Bochusacea, or as part of a wider Mictacea. It comprises five species in three genera:

- Hirsutia bathyalis Saunders, Hessler & Garner, 1985
- Hirsutia saundersetalia Just & Poore, 1988
- Thetispelecaris remex Gutu & Iliffe, 1998
- Thetispelecaris yurigako Ohtsuka, Hanamura & Kase, 2002
- Montucaris distincta Jaume, Boxshall & Bamber, 2006

== See also ==
- Mictocaris
