= Dolicholana =

Scientific classification
- Kingdom: Animalia
- Phylum: Arthropoda
- Class: Malacostraca
- Order: Isopoda
- Family: Cirolanidae
- Genus: Dolicholana; Bruce, 1986

Genus of crustaceans

Dolicholana is a genus of isopod crustaceans. which was first described by Niel L. Bruce in 1986. The type species is Cirolana elongata Milne Edwards, 1840.

Australian states where Dolicholana species are found are Queensland and New South Wales. Beyond Australian waters species of this genus are found in the waters of Myanmar, and the Straits of Malacca.

== Species ==
Dolicholana includes the following species:

- Dolicholana brucei Paiva & Souza-Filho, 2015
- Dolicholana elongata (H. Milne Edwards, 1840)
- Dolicholana enigma Keable, 1999
- Dolicholana porcellana (Barnard, 1936)
