= Stenasellidae =

Scientific classification
- Kingdom: Animalia
- Phylum: Arthropoda
- Class: Malacostraca
- Order: Isopoda
- Suborder: Asellota
- Superfamily: Aselloidea
- Family: Stenasellidae; Dudich, 1924

Family of crustaceans

Stenasellidae is a family of isopods belonging to the order Isopoda.

Genera:

- Acanthastenasellus Chelazzi & Messana, 1985
- Balkanostenasellus Cvetkov, 1975
- Etlastenasellus Argano, 1977
- Johannella Monod, 1924
- Magniezia Lanza, 1966
- Metastenasellus Magniez, 1966
- Mexistenasellus Cole & W. L. Minckley, 1972
- Parastenasellus Magniez, 1966
- Protelsonia Méhely, 1924
- Stenasellus Dollfus, 1897
