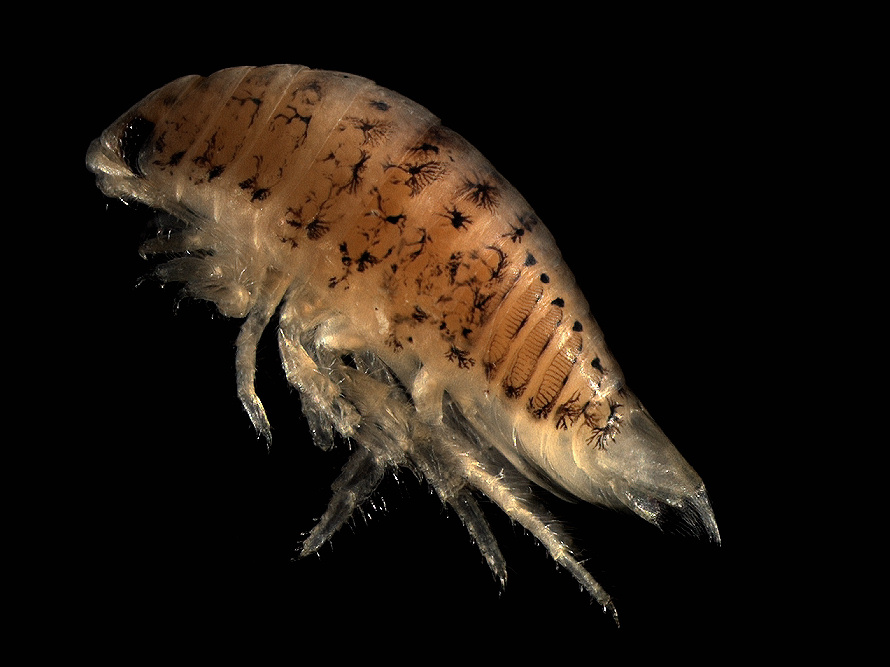
- Eurydice pulchra

Scientific classification
- Kingdom: Animalia
- Phylum: Arthropoda
- Clade: Pancrustacea
- Class: Malacostraca
- Order: Isopoda
- Suborder: Cymothoida
- Superfamily: Cymothooidea
- Family: Cirolanidae; Dana, 1852

Synonyms
- Bathynomidae Wood Mason & Alcock, 1891

= Cirolanidae =

Family of crustaceans

Cirolanidae is a family of aquatic isopods.

== Genera ==
The family contains the following genera:

- Aatolana Bruce, 1993
- Annina Budde-Lund, 1908
- Antrolana Bowman, 1964
- Aphantolana Moore & Brusca, 2003
- Arubolana Botosaneanu & Stock, 1979
- Atarbolana Bruce & Javed, 1987
- Bahalana Carpenter, 1981
- Baharilana Bruce & Svavarsson, 2003
- Bathylana Kensley, 1989
- Bathynomus A. Milne-Edwards, 1879
- Booralana Bruce, 1986
- Botolana Coineau & Boutin, 2015
- Calyptolana Bruce, 1985
- Cartetolana Bruce, 1981
- Catailana Messana, 2020
- Ceratolana Bowman, 1977
- Cirolana Leach, 1818
- Cirolanides Benedict, 1896
- Colopisthus Richardson, 1902
- Conilera Leach, 1818
- Conilorpheus Stebbing, 1905
- Creaseriella Rioja, 1953
- Dolicholana Bruce, 1986
- Eurydice Leach, 1815
- Eurylana Jansen, 1981
- Excirolana Richardson, 1912
- Exumalana Botosaneanu & Iliffe, 2003
- Faucheria Dollfus & Viré, 1905
- Gnatholana Barnard, 1920
- Hansenolana Stebbing, 1900
- Haptolana Bowman, 1966
- Kagalana Bruce, 2008
- Kensleylana Bruce & Herrando-Perez, 2005
- Limicolana Bruce, 1986
- Lucayalana Bruce & Brix, 2017
- Marocolana Boulanouar, Boutin & Coineau, 1993
- Metacirolana Nierstrasz, 1931
- Mexilana Bowman, 1975
- Natatolana Bruce, 1981
- Neocirolana Hale, 1925
- Odysseylana Malyutina, 1995
- Oncilorpheus Paul & Menzies, 1971
- Orphelana Bruce, 1981
- †Palaega Woodward, 1870
- Parabathynomus Barnard, 1924
- Parilcirolana Yu & Li, 2001
- Plakolana Bruce, 1993
- †Pleovideolana Gašparic, Fraaije, van Bakel, Jagt & Skupien, 2015
- Politolana Bruce, 1981
- Pontogelos Stebbing, 1910
- Pseudaega G. Thomson, 1883
- Pseudolana Bruce, 1979
- †Pseudopalaega Mezzalira & Martins-Neto, 1992
- Saharolana Monod, 1930
- Scutulana Bruce, 1996
- Seychellana Kensley & Schotte, 1994
- Sintorolana Bruce, 1996
- Skotobaena Ferrara & Monod, 1972
- Speocirolana Bolivar y Pieltain, 1950
- Sphaerolana Cole & W. L. Minckley, 1970
- Sphaeromides Dollfus, 1897
- Sululana Bruce & Shimomura, 2019
- Turcolana Argano & Pesce, 1980
- Typhlocirolana Racovitza, 1905
- Xylolana Kensley, 1987
- Yucatalana Botosaneanu & Iliffe, 1999
- Zulialana Botosaneanu & Viloria, 1993
