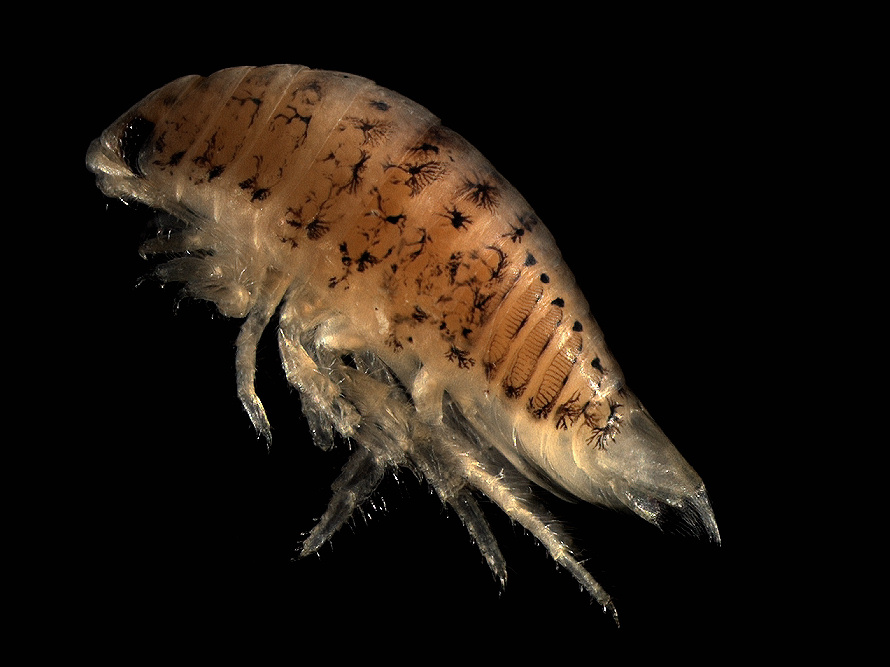
- Eurydice pulchra (Cirolanidae)

Scientific classification
- Kingdom: Animalia
- Phylum: Arthropoda
- Class: Malacostraca
- Superorder: Peracarida
- Order: Isopoda
- Suborder: Cymothoida; Wägele, 1989

Superfamilies
- Anthuroidea; Bopyroidea; Cymothooidea; Cryptoniscoidea

= Cymothoida =

Suborder of crustaceans

Cymothoida is a suborder of isopod crustaceans with a mostly carnivorous or parasitic lifestyle. It contains more than 2,700 described species in four superfamilies. Members of the suborder are characterised by their specialised mouthparts which include a mandible with a tooth-like process which is adapted for cutting or slicing.

== Classification ==
Cymothoida contains these superfamilies and families:

- Superfamily Anthuroidea Leach, 1814
  - Antheluridae Poore & Lew Ton, 1988
  - Anthuridae Leach, 1814
  - Expanathuridae Poore, 2001
  - Hyssuridae Wägele, 1981
  - Leptanthuridae Poore, 2001
  - Paranthuridae Menzies & Glynn, 1968
- Superfamily Cymothooidea Leach, 1814
  - Aegidae White, 1850
  - Anuropidae Stebbing, 1893
  - Barybrotidae Hansen, 1890
  - Cirolanidae Dana, 1852
  - Corallanidae Hansen, 1890
  - Cymothoidae Leach, 1818
  - Gnathiidae Leach, 1814
  - Protognathiidae Wägele & Brandt, 1988
  - Tridentellidae Bruce, 1984
- Infraorder Epicaridea
  - Superfamily Cryptoniscoidea Kossmann, 1880
    - Asconiscidae Bonnier, 1900
    - Cabiropidae Giard & Bonnier, 1887
    - Crinoniscidae Bonnier, 1900
    - Cryptoniscidae Kossmann, 1880
    - Cyproniscidae Bonnier, 1900
    - Dajidae Giard & Bonnier, 1887 (synonym: Colypuridae Richardson, 1905)
    - Entophilidae Richardson, 1903
    - Hemioniscidae Bonnier, 1900
    - Podasconidae Bonnier, 1900
    - Stellatoniscidae Oanh & Boyko, 2020
  - Superfamily Bopyroidea Rafinesque, 1815
    - Bopyridae Rafinesque, 1815
    - Entoniscidae Kossmann, 1881
    - Ionidae H. Milne Edwards, 1840
