= Prodajus ostendensis =

Scientific classification
- Kingdom: Animalia
- Phylum: Arthropoda
- Clade: Pancrustacea
- Class: Malacostraca
- Order: Isopoda
- Family: Dajidae
- Genus: Prodajus
- Species: P. ostendensis

Binomial name
- Prodajus ostendensis Gilson, 1909

Species of crustacean

Prodajus ostendensis is a species of marine isopod in the family Dajidae and is found in the North Sea. It is an ectoparasite of the opossum shrimp Gastrosaccus spinifer. It is normally found living in the host's marsupium and devouring its eggs.

== Description ==
Prodajus ostendensis grows to a length of about 3 mm (0.1 in). The female has a symmetrical leaf-shaped body with the mouth on the underside and a two-lobed brood pouch enclosed by small oostegites. The segmentation is indistinct and the five pairs of pereiopods (thoracic limbs) are small and close to the mouth. The pleopods (abdominal legs) are either small or missing altogether. The male often has its segments fused together and has a relatively long pleon (abdomen).
