= Kupellonura werawera =

Scientific classification
- Kingdom: Animalia
- Phylum: Arthropoda
- Clade: Pancrustacea
- Class: Malacostraca
- Order: Isopoda
- Family: Hyssuridae
- Genus: Kupellonura
- Species: K. werawera

Binomial name
- Kupellonura werawera Poore & Lew Ton, 1988

Species of crustacean

Kupellonura werawera is a species of crustacean of the order Isopoda. The holotype was collected from Orpheus Island, Queensland, but its wider distribution is unknown.
