= Curassanthura bermudensis =

Conservation status
- Critically Endangered (IUCN 2.3)

Scientific classification
- Kingdom: Animalia
- Phylum: Arthropoda
- Class: Malacostraca
- Order: Isopoda
- Family: Leptanthuridae
- Genus: Curassanthura
- Species: C. bermudensis

Binomial name
- Curassanthura bermudensis Wägele & Brandt, 1985

Species of crustacean

Curassanthura bermudensis is a species of isopod crustacean in the family Leptanthuridae, endemic to Bermuda. It was described in 1985 by Johann Wägele and Angelika Brandt on the basis of a single immature specimen. This holotype specimen, which is 3 millimetres (0.12 in) long, was collected from Church Cave in Hamilton Parish, Bermuda, and is now stored at the Zoological Museum Amsterdam.
