= Cabiropidae =

Scientific classification
- Kingdom: Animalia
- Phylum: Arthropoda
- Clade: Pancrustacea
- Class: Malacostraca
- Order: Isopoda
- Suborder: Cymothoida
- Infraorder: Epicaridea
- Superfamily: Cryptoniscoidea
- Family: Cabiropidae; Giard and Bonnier, 1887

Genera
- see text

Family of crustaceans

The Cabiropidae are a family of isopod crustaceans in the suborder Cymothoida. The original description was made by Giard and Bonnier in 1887. Members of the family are hyperparasites of other parasitic isopods in the order and some are parasites on other free-living isopods.

The family contains these genera:

- Aegoniscus Barnard, 1925
- Ancyroniscus Caullery & Mesnil, 1919
- Arcturocheres Hansen, 1916
- Astacilloechus Hansen, 1916
- Bourdonia Rybakov, 1990
- Cabirops Kossmann, 1884
- Cirolanoniscus Pillai, 1966
- Cironiscus Nielsen, 1967
- Clypeoniscus Giard & Bonnier, 1895
- Gnomoniscus Giard & Bonnier, 1895
- Munnoniscus Giard & Bonnier, 1895
- Podoniscus Bourdon, 1981
- Seroloniscus Giard & Bonnier, 1895
