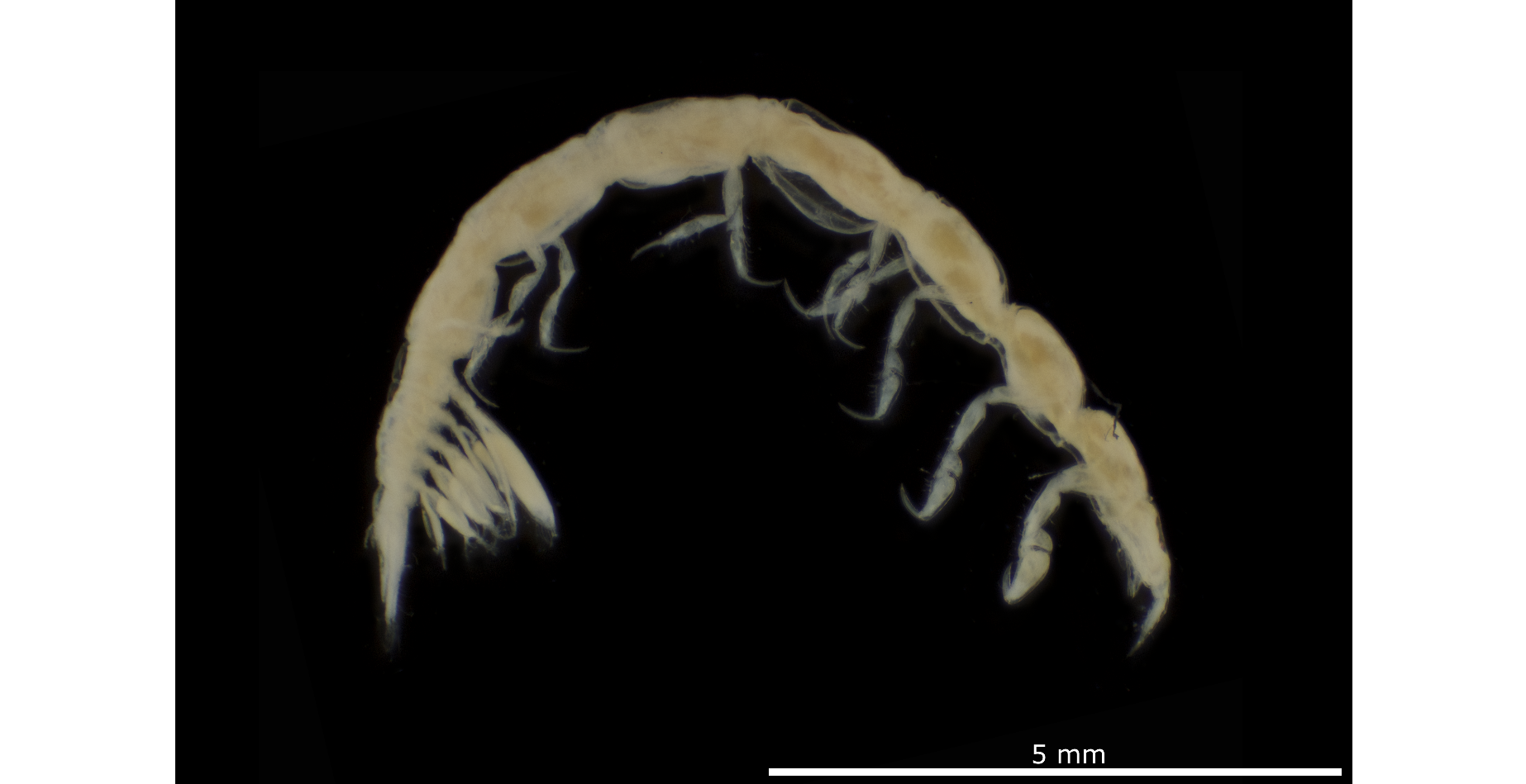
- Leptanthura hendili

Scientific classification
- Kingdom: Animalia
- Phylum: Arthropoda
- Class: Malacostraca
- Order: Isopoda
- Family: Leptanthuridae
- Genus: Leptanthura; G. O. Sars, 1897

Type species
- Paranthura tenuis G. O. Sars, 1873

= Leptanthura =

Genus of crustaceans

Leptanthura is a genus of isopod crustaceans in the family Leptanthuridae. It was first described in 1897 by Georg Ossian Sars and the type species is Paranthura tenuis. It is found in coastal waters throughout the world, and contains the following species:

- Leptanthura affinis (Bonnier, 1896)
- Leptanthura agulhasensis Kensley, 1975
- Leptanthura antarctica Kussakin, 1967
- Leptanthura apalpata Wägele, 1981
- Leptanthura argentinae Kensley, 1982
- Leptanthura baliensis Negoescu, 1992
- Leptanthura boweni Poore, 1981
- Leptanthura calcis Kensley & Schotte, 2000
- Leptanthura chardyi Negoescu, 1992
- Leptanthura chiltoni (Beddard, 1886)
- Leptanthura communis Negoescu, 2007
- Leptanthura coralliophila Müller, 1992
- Leptanthura diemenensis (Haswell, 1885)
- Leptanthura elegans Birstein, 1963
- Leptanthura exilis Wägele, 1985
- Leptanthura flindersi Poore, 1981
- Leptanthura geocostarioi Negoescu, 1991
- Leptanthura glacialis Hodgson, 1910
- Leptanthura guianae Kensley, 1982
- Leptanthura hendili Wolff, 1956
- Leptanthura kapala Poore, 1978
- Leptanthura laevigata (Stimpson, 1855)
- Leptanthura maheensis Kensley & Schotte, 2000
- Leptanthura melanomma Vanhoeffen, 1914
- Leptanthura micrura Kensley, 1982
- Leptanthura minuta Kensley, 1978
- Leptanthura monnioti Negoescu, 1994
- Leptanthura muelleri Negoescu, 1980
- Leptanthura murrayi Poore, 1981
- Leptanthura natalensis Kensley, 1978
- Leptanthura nunana Poore, 1978
- Leptanthura orientalis Barnard, 1925
- Leptanthura profundicola Wägele, 1985
- Leptanthura sculpta Pasternak, 1982
- Leptanthura segonzaci Negoescu, 1994
- Leptanthura tenuis (G. O. Sars, 1873)
- Leptanthura thalassae Negoescu, 1980
- Leptanthura thori Barnard, 1925
- Leptanthura truncata Richardson, 1911
- Leptanthura truncatitelson Wägele, 1985
- Leptanthura urospinosa Kensley, 1975
- Leptanthura victori Negoescu, 1985
- Leptanthura vitilevui Negoescu, 1999

== External ==
- Leptanthura: Images & occurrence data from GBIF
