= Podasconidae =

Scientific classification
- Kingdom: Animalia
- Phylum: Arthropoda
- Clade: Pancrustacea
- Class: Malacostraca
- Order: Isopoda
- Suborder: Cymothoida
- Infraorder: Epicaridea
- Superfamily: Cryptoniscoidea
- Family: Podasconidae; Giard and Bonnier, 1895

Genera
- see text

Family of crustaceans

The Podasconidae are a family of marine isopod crustaceans in the suborder Cymothoida. The original description was made by Giard and Bonnier in 1895. Members of this family are parasitic on amphipods.

The family contains these genera and species:

- Parapodascon Hansen, 1916

- Parapodascon stebbingi (Giard & Bonnier, 1895)

- Podascon Giard & Bonnier, 1889

- Podascon chevreuxi Giard & Bonnier, 1895
- Podascon dellavallei Giard & Bonnier, 1889
- Podascon haploopis Giard & Bonnier, 1895
- Podascon chevreuxi Giard & Bonnier, 1893 (nomen nudum)
