= Brasileirinho cavaticus =

Scientific classification
- Kingdom: Animalia
- Phylum: Arthropoda
- Clade: Pancrustacea
- Class: Malacostraca
- Order: Isopoda
- Suborder: Calabozoidea
- Family: Brasileirinidae; Prevorčnik, Ferreira & Sket, 2012
- Genus: Brasileirinho; Prevorčnik, Ferreira & Sket, 2012
- Species: B. cavaticus

Binomial name
- Brasileirinho cavaticus Prevorčnik, Ferreira & Sket, 2012

Species of crustacean

Brasileirinho cavaticus is a species of freshwater isopod. It is the only member of the monotypic genus Brasileirinho, which in turn is the only member of the family Brasileirinidae.

== Description ==
It has a transparent white-ish oval body. The male is around 1.7 millimetres (0.067 in) long, whereas the female is around 2.4 millimetres (0.094 in) long. Both are around 3 times longer than it is wide. It doesn't have eyes. The first and second pleonites are much smaller than the pereonites. Pleonites three to five are as long as the pereonites. The entire length of the pleotelson does not exceed one fifth of the entire body length. The first pair of pleopods is absent in females, and uniramous in males. Despite their aquatic habitat, they are unable to swim.

== Ecology ==
The species is a troglobiont, found in a pond in a karst cave in Bahia, Brazil. The members of the species were found to aggregate on the bottom of the pond. The pond featured a relatively high population density, with individuals frequently bumping into each other. They do not exhibit any phototactic behavior. They most likely feed on Guano.
