= Hemioniscidae =

Scientific classification
- Kingdom: Animalia
- Phylum: Arthropoda
- Clade: Pancrustacea
- Class: Malacostraca
- Order: Isopoda
- Suborder: Cymothoida
- Infraorder: Epicaridea
- Superfamily: Cryptoniscoidea
- Family: Hemioniscidae; Bonnier, 1900

Genera
- see text

Family of crustaceans

The Hemioniscidae are a family of marine isopod crustaceans in the suborder Cymothoida. The original description was made by Bonnier in 1900. Members of this family are parasitic on cirripede barnacles.

The family contains these genera and species:

- Hemioniscus Buchholz, 1866

- Hemioniscus balani Buchholtz, 1866
- Hemioniscus pagurophilus Williams & Boyko, 2006

- Leponiscus Giard, 1887

- Leponiscus alepadis Gruvel, 1901
- Leponiscus anatifae Giard, 1887
- Leponiscus pollicipedis Giard, 1887

- Scalpelloniscus Grygier, 1981

- Scalpelloniscus binoculis (Menzies & George, 1972)
- Scalpelloniscus nieli Hosie, 2008
- Scalpelloniscus penicillatus Grygier, 1981
- Scalpelloniscus vomicus Hosie, 2008
