= Curassanthura =

Scientific classification
- Kingdom: Animalia
- Phylum: Arthropoda
- Class: Malacostraca
- Order: Isopoda
- Family: Leptanthuridae
- Genus: Curassanthura; Kensley, 1981

Genus of crustaceans

Curassanthura is a genus of isopod crustaceans in the family Leptanthuridae. It contains the following species:

- Curassanthura bermudensis Wägele & Brandt, 1985
- Curassanthura canariensis Wägele, 1985
- Curassanthura halma Kensley, 1981
- Curassanthura jamaicensis Kensley, 1992
