= Ione (crustacean) =

Scientific classification
- Kingdom: Animalia
- Phylum: Arthropoda
- Clade: Pancrustacea
- Class: Malacostraca
- Order: Isopoda
- Suborder: Cymothoida
- Infraorder: Epicaridea
- Superfamily: Bopyroidea
- Family: Ionidae; Milne Edwards, 1840
- Genus: Ione; Latreille, 1818

Family of crustacean

Ione is a genus of marine or freshwater isopods. It is the only genus in the family Ionidae.

== Species ==
The genus contains the following species:

- Ione cornuta Spence Bate, 1863
- Ione ovata Shiino, 1964
- Ione sarahae Hernáez, Villegas-Castro & Boyko, 2023
- Ione taiwanensis Markham, 1995
- Ione thompsoni Richardson, 1904
- Ione thoracica (Montagu, 1808)
- Ione tubulata Bourdon, 1976
