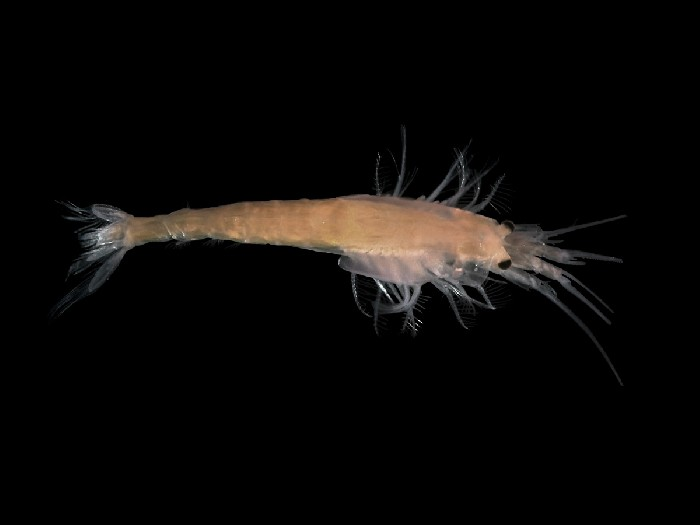

Scientific classification
- Kingdom: Animalia
- Phylum: Arthropoda
- Class: Malacostraca
- Order: Mysida
- Family: Mysidae
- Genus: Gastrosaccus
- Species: G. spinifer

Binomial name
- Gastrosaccus spinifer (Goës, 1864)

= Gastrosaccus spinifer =

Species of crustacean

Gastrosaccus spinifer is a shrimp-like crustacean in the order Mysida, the opossum shrimps, native to the eastern Atlantic Ocean and the coasts of Northern and Western Europe.

== Description ==
Gastrosaccus spinifer is a slender opossum shrimp, somewhat laterally compressed, and growing to a length of about 21 mm (0.8 in). It is transparent with tinges of yellow, or brownish pink around the mouthparts, by the edges of the segments and on the telson (tail-like projection from the last abdominal segment). The carapace has a short fringe round its margin. As in other female opossum shrimps, the biramous (branching) pereopods (limbs on the thorax) form a marsupium or brood pouch. In this species there are two plate-like appendages attached to the front abdominal segment which fold under the brood pouch to protect it. This gives the female a rhomboidal shape when viewed from the side. The chief distinguishing factor for this species is the fact that the fifth abdominal segment is slender and has a long spine on its dorsal surface.

== Distribution and habitat ==
Gastrosaccus spinifer is native to shallow water in the eastern Atlantic Ocean, the Baltic Sea, the North Sea, the Mediterranean Sea, the Black Sea and the Sea of Azov. Its range extends from Norway to northern and western Africa as far south as Sierra Leone. It is found at depths down to about 260 m (853 ft) on soft sediments and in seagrass meadows and often buries itself in the sand or mud. In the North Sea, it often forms swarms and has sometimes been found at densities exceeding 1000 individuals per square metre (11 sq ft).

== Ecology ==
Prodajus ostendensis is a parasitic isopod found living on Gastrosaccus spinifer. It clings to the opossum shrimp's carapace near the junction of the cephalothorax and abdomen and resembles a fleshy growth or may occupy the host's brood chamber.
