= Bourdonia =

Scientific classification
- Kingdom: Animalia
- Phylum: Arthropoda
- Class: Malacostraca
- Order: Isopoda
- Family: Cabiropidae
- Genus: Bourdonia; Rybakov, 1990

Species
- Bourdonia tridentata

Genus of crustaceans

For the plant genus, see Chaetopappa.

Bourdonia is a genus of isopod crustaceans in the family Cabiropidae.

Bourdonia tridentata is a hyperparasite of Bopyroides hippolytes from the shrimp Pandalus borealis.
