= Cryptoniscidae =

Scientific classification
- Kingdom: Animalia
- Phylum: Arthropoda
- Clade: Pancrustacea
- Class: Malacostraca
- Order: Isopoda
- Suborder: Cymothoida
- Infraorder: Epicaridea
- Superfamily: Cryptoniscoidea
- Family: Cryptoniscidae; Kossmann, 1880

Genera
- see text

Family of crustaceans

The Cryptoniscidae are a family of marine isopod crustaceans in the suborder Cymothoida. The original description was made by Kossmann in 1880. Liriopsidae is a junior synonym. Members of this family are hyperparasites of rhizocephalid barnacles which are themselves parasites of decapod crustaceans. The morphology of the adult females gives little clue as to their true identity, but the free-living larvae show their true taxonomic affiliations.

== Genera ==
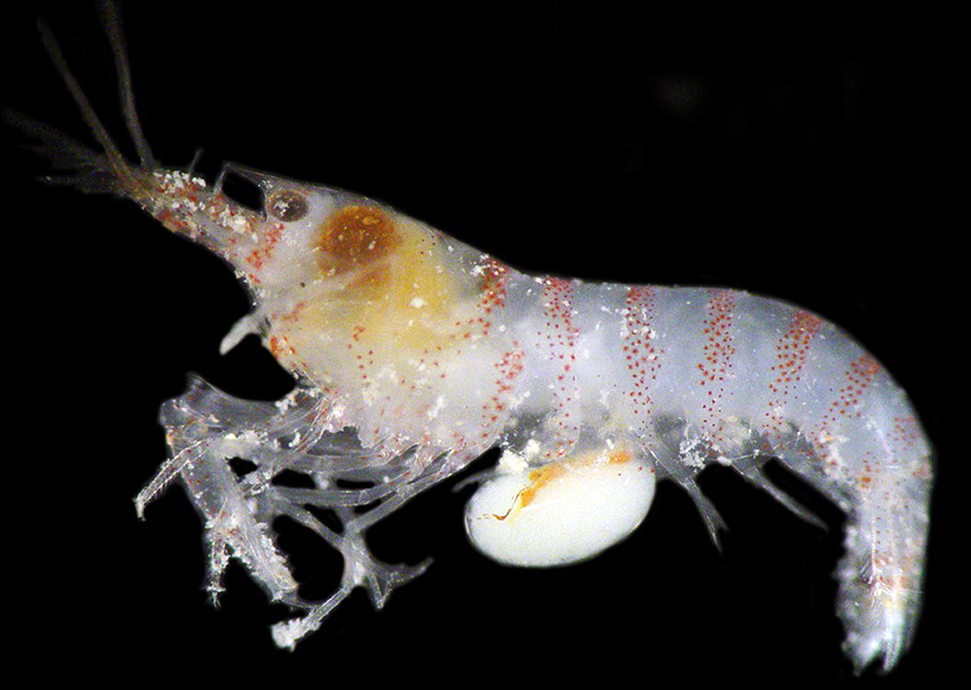
Alpheus sp. from Fiji with Faba sp. (Cryptoniscidae) attached to ventral surface

The family contains these genera:

- Avada Boyoko, 2014
- Cabirnalia Boyko & van der Meij, 2018
- Cryptoniscus F. Müller, 1864
- Danalia Giard, 1887
- Enthylacus Pérez, 1920
- Eumetor Kossmann, 1872
- Liriopsis Schultze in Müller, 1859
- Zeuxokoma Grygier, 1993
