= Kupellonura =

Scientific classification
- Kingdom: Animalia
- Phylum: Arthropoda
- Clade: Pancrustacea
- Class: Malacostraca
- Order: Isopoda
- Family: Hyssuridae
- Genus: Kupellonura; Barnard, 1925

Genus of isopods

Kupellonura is a genus of isopods in the family Hyssuridae. It contains 18 species.

== Species ==
Kupellonura contains the following species:

- Kupellonura afareaitu Müller, 1991
- Kupellonura biriwa Poore & Lew Ton, 1988
- Kupellonura capensis (Kensley, 1975)
- Kupellonura caudoserrata Negoescu, 1994
- Kupellonura cryosi Negoescu, 2006
- Kupellonura currawan Poore & Lew Ton, 1988
- Kupellonura formosa (Menzies & Frankenberg, 1966)
- Kupellonura gidgee Poore & Lew Ton, 1988
- Kupellonura imswe (Kensley, 1982)
- Kupellonura indonesica Annisaqois & Wägele, 2021
- Kupellonura macaroni Annisaqois & Wägele, 2021
- Kupellonura marrongie Poore & Lew Ton, 1988
- Kupellonura mediterranea Barnard, 1925
- Kupellonura proberti Wägele, 1985
- Kupellonura racovitzai George & Negoescu, 1985
- Kupellonura serritelson Wägele, 1981
- Kupellonura tamago Shiraki, Shimomura & Kakui, 2022
- Kupellonura werawera Poore & Lew Ton, 1988
