= Tridentella =

Scientific classification
- Kingdom: Animalia
- Phylum: Arthropoda
- Class: Malacostraca
- Order: Isopoda
- Suborder: Cymothoida
- Superfamily: Cymothooidea
- Family: Tridentellidae
- Genus: Tridentella; Richardson, 1905

Genus of crustaceans

Tridentella is a genus of crustaceans belonging to the monotypic family Tridentellidae.

The species of this genus are found in America, Malesia, and Australia.

== Species ==
The genus contains the following species:

- Tridentella acheronae Bruce, 1988
- Tridentella benguela Brandt & Poore, 2001
- Tridentella brandtae Bruce, 2008
- Tridentella cornuta Kussakin, 1979
- Tridentella glutacantha Delaney & Brusca, 1985
- Tridentella japonica Thielemann, 1910
- Tridentella katlae Bruce & Svavarsson, 2018
- Tridentella laevicephalax Menzies, 1962
- Tridentella magna Bruce & Svavarsson, 2018
- Tridentella memikat Bruce, 2008
- Tridentella namibia Brandt & Poore, 2001
- Tridentella ornamenta (Menzies & George, 1972)
- Tridentella ornate (Richardson, 1911)
- Tridentella palmata Bruce & Svavarsson, 2018
- Tridentella quinicornis Delaney & Brusca, 1985
- Tridentella recava Bowman, 1986
- Tridentella rosemariae Bruce, 2002
- Tridentella saxicola (Hale, 1925)
- Tridentella sculpturata Kussakin, 1955
- Tridentella tangaroae Bruce, 1988
- Tridentella tanimbar Bruce, 2008
- Tridentella virginiana (Richardson, 1900)
- Tridentella vitae Bruce, 1984
