= Anuropus =

Scientific classification
- Kingdom: Animalia
- Phylum: Arthropoda
- Class: Malacostraca
- Order: Isopoda
- Suborder: Cymothoida
- Superfamily: Cymothooidea
- Family: Anuropidae; Stebbing, 1893
- Genus: Anuropus; Beddard, 1886

Type species
- Anuropus branchiatus Beddard, 1886

Genus of crustaceans

Anuropus is a genus of isopods in the suborder Cymothoida. As of 2021, it is the only genus in the family Anuropidae.

== Taxonomic history ==
The genus Anuropus was first circumscribed by the English zoologist Frank Evers Beddard in 1886. His new genus coincided with his description of the type species, A. branchiatus. Beddard placed Anuropus in the family Cymothoidae, but in 1893, Thomas Roscoe Rede Stebbing wrote it "may have greater claims to be the type of a distinct family, Anuropidæ". In 1903, Hans Jacob Hansen thought Anuropus might possibly belong to the subfamily Cirolaninae or perhaps a new subfamily Anuropinae.

== Species ==
As of 2021, World Register of Marine Species recognizes the following ten species in this genus:

- A. aeronautus Sivertsen & Holthuis, 1980
- A. antarcticus Hale, 1952
- A. australis Schultz, 1977
- A. bathypelagicus Menzies & Dow, 1958
- A. branchiatus Beddard, 1886
- A. kussakini Vasina, 1998
- A. novaezealandiae Jansen, 1981
- A. pacificus Lincoln & Jones, 1973
- A. panteni Brandt & Retzlaff, 2002
- A. sanguineus Nunomura, 1983
