= Ulakanthura =

Scientific classification
- Kingdom: Animalia
- Phylum: Arthropoda
- Clade: Pancrustacea
- Class: Malacostraca
- Order: Isopoda
- Family: Leptanthuridae
- Genus: Ulakanthura; Poore, 1978

Type species
- Paranthura crassicornis Haswell, 1881

Genus of crustaceans

Ulakanthura is a genus of isopod crustaceans within the family Leptanthuridae, containing 7 species.

== Species ==
- Ulakanthura colac Poore, 1978
- Ulakanthura cooma Poore, 1978
- Ulakanthura crassicornis (Haswell, 1881)
- Ulakanthura lara Poore, 1978
- Ulakanthura marlee Poore, 1981
- Ulakanthura namoo Poore, 1978
- Ulakanthura wanda Poore, 1978
