= Crinoniscidae =

Scientific classification
- Kingdom: Animalia
- Phylum: Arthropoda
- Clade: Pancrustacea
- Class: Malacostraca
- Order: Isopoda
- Suborder: Cymothoida
- Infraorder: Epicaridea
- Superfamily: Cryptoniscoidea
- Family: Crinoniscidae; Bonnier, 1900

Genera
- see text

Family of crustaceans

The Crinoniscidae are a family of isopod crustaceans in the suborder Cymothoida. The original description was made by Bonnier in 1900. Members of this family are parasites, mostly on other crustaceans. Crinoniscus equitans is parasitic on the barnacle, Balanus perforatus.

The family contains these genera and species:

- Crinoniscus Perez, 1900
  - Crinoniscus cephalatus Hosie, 2008
  - Crinoniscus equitans Perez, 1900
  - Crinoniscus politosummus Hosie, 2008
- Proteolepas Darwin, 1854
  - Proteolepas bivincta Darwin, 1854
