= Protognathia =

Scientific classification
- Kingdom: Animalia
- Phylum: Arthropoda
- Class: Malacostraca
- Order: Isopoda
- Suborder: Cymothoida
- Superfamily: Cymothooidea
- Family: Protognathiidae
- Genus: Protognathia; Wägele & Brandt, 1988

Type species
- Cirolana bathypelagica Schultz, 1977

Genus of crustaceans

Protognathia is a genus of marine isopods belonging to the monotypic family Protognathiidae.

The species of this genus are found in southernmost South Hemisphere, more specifically in the Weddell Sea, where the type specimen was found at a water depth from 410 to 245 meters.

== Species ==
The Genus contains the following species:

- Protognathia bathypelagica (Schultz, 1977)
- Protognathia waegeli Kussakin & Rybakov, 1995

== Description ==
Isopods of this family (and genus respectively) are a morphologic intermediate between members of Gnathiidae and Cirolanidae, which is why the type species, Protognathia bathypelagica, was at first misidentified as Cirolana bathypelagica. Their pleonites are not fused. Pereonites four to six are larger than the remaining segments, and the seventh pereonite is about as large as a pleonite. The seventh pereopod is absent. The uropods are flat and slender, almost as long as the pleotelson. Members of this genus have a tail fan and lack eyes. All pleopods have similar outlines, with large branches.

== Ecology ==
While its mandibles resemble those of cirolanid isopods, it is not used as a cutting instrument, as they have a pronounced point probably used for stinging. This then suggests a bloodsucking, ectoparasitic ecology.
