= Asconiscus =

Scientific classification
- Kingdom: Animalia
- Phylum: Arthropoda
- Clade: Pancrustacea
- Class: Malacostraca
- Order: Isopoda
- Suborder: Cymothoida
- Infraorder: Epicaridea
- Superfamily: Cryptoniscoidea
- Family: Asconiscidae; Bonnier, 1900
- Genus: Asconiscus; G. O. Sars, 1899
- Species: A. simplex

Binomial name
- Asconiscus simplex G. O. Sars, 1899

Genus of crustaceans

Asconiscus is a genus in the Asconiscidae family of marine isopod crustaceans in the suborder Cymothoida, containing a single genus and a single species, Asconiscus simplex. The original description of the family was made by Bonnier in 1900. A. simplex is a parasite of the shrimp-like crustacean, Boreomysis arctica.
