= Tainisopidea =

Scientific classification
- Kingdom: Animalia
- Phylum: Arthropoda
- Clade: Pancrustacea
- Class: Malacostraca
- Order: Isopoda
- Suborder: Tainisopidea; Brandt & Poore, 2003

Suborder of freshwater isopods

Tainisopidea is a suborder of freshwater isopods living in relictual environments. Members of this group use drag powered swimming to move around.

== Taxonomy ==
Tainisopidae contains nine species, distributed into one family and two genera:

- Tainisopidae
  - Pygolabis
    - P. eberhardi
    - P. gascoyne
    - P. humphreysi
    - P. paraburdoo
    - P. weeliwolli
  - Tainisopus
    - T. fontinalis
    - T. napierensis
