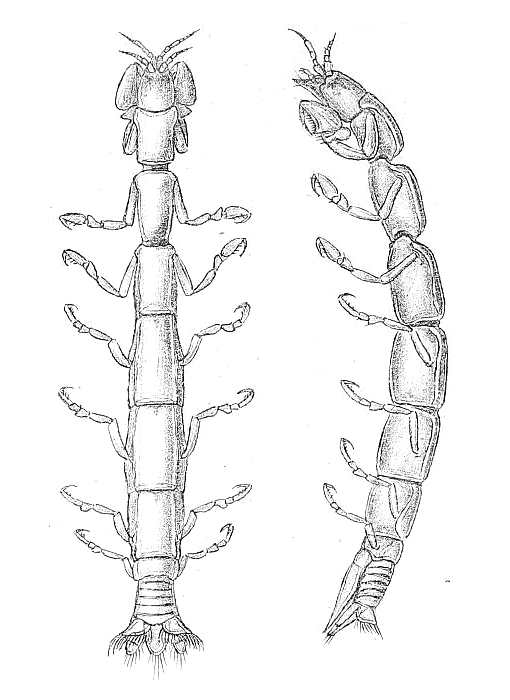
- Calathura norvegica (Leptanthuridae)

Scientific classification
- Kingdom: Animalia
- Phylum: Arthropoda
- Clade: Pancrustacea
- Class: Malacostraca
- Order: Isopoda
- Suborder: Cymothoida
- Superfamily: Anthuroidea; Leach, 1814

= Anthuroidea =

Superfamily of crustaceans

Anthuroidea is a superfamily of isopod crustaceans, formerly treated as a suborder, Anthuridea. The group is characterised by "an elongate cylindrical body form, without dorsal coxal plates, and with a uropodal exopod attached to the peduncle proximally and dorsally". There are more than 500 described species in 57 genera, arranged across six families:

- Antheluridae Poore & Lew Ton, 1988;
- Anthuridae Leach, 1814;
- Expanathuridae Poore, 2001;
- Hyssuridae Wägele, 1981;
- Leptanthuridae Poore, 2001;
- Paranthuridae Menzies & Glynn, 1968.
