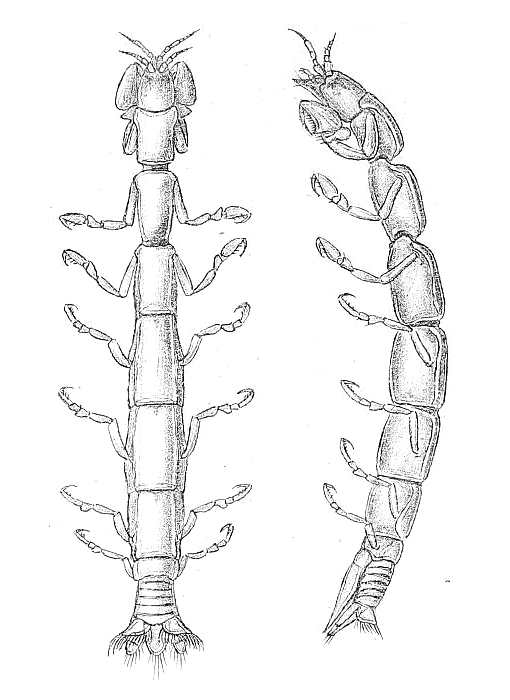
- Calathura norvegica female

Scientific classification
- Kingdom: Animalia
- Phylum: Arthropoda
- Clade: Pancrustacea
- Class: Malacostraca
- Order: Isopoda
- Suborder: Cymothoida
- Superfamily: Anthuroidea
- Family: Leptanthuridae; Poore, 2001

= Leptanthuridae =

Family of crustaceans

Leptanthuridae is a family of isopod crustaceans, containing the following genera:

- Accalathura Barnard, 1925
- Aenigmathura Thomson, 1951
- Albanthura Wägele, 1985
- Bourbonanthura Müller, 1990
- Bullowanthura Poore, 1978
- Bunderanthura Poore & Humphreys, 2013
- Calathura Norman & Stebbing, 1886
- Curassanthura Kensley, 1981
- Leptanthura Sars, 1897
- Negoescuanthura Jarquín-Martínez & García-Madrigal, 2021
- Neoanthura Menzies, 1956
- Psittanthura Wägele, 1985
- Ulakanthura Poore, 1978
- Virganthura Kensley, 1987
