= Cyproniscidae =

Scientific classification
- Kingdom: Animalia
- Phylum: Arthropoda
- Clade: Pancrustacea
- Class: Malacostraca
- Order: Isopoda
- Suborder: Cymothoida
- Infraorder: Epicaridea
- Superfamily: Cryptoniscoidea
- Family: Cyproniscidae; Giard and Bonnier, 1887

Genera
- see text

Family of crustaceans

The Cyproniscidae are a family of marine isopod crustaceans in the suborder Cymothoida. The original description was made by Bonnier in 1900. Members of this family are parasitic on other isopods.

The family contains these genera and species:

- Cyproniscus Kossmann, 1884
  - Cyproniscus crossophori Stebbing, 1901
  - Cyproniscus cypridinae (G.O. Sars, 1883)
  - Cyproniscus decemspinosus Menzies & George, 1972
  - Cyproniscus octospinosus Menzies & George, 1972
  - Cyproniscus peruvicus Menzies & George, 1972
- Onisocryptus Schultz, 1977
  - Onisocryptus kurilensis Rybakov, 1998
  - Onisocryptus ovalis (Shiino, 1942)
  - Onisocryptus sagittus Schultz, 1977
