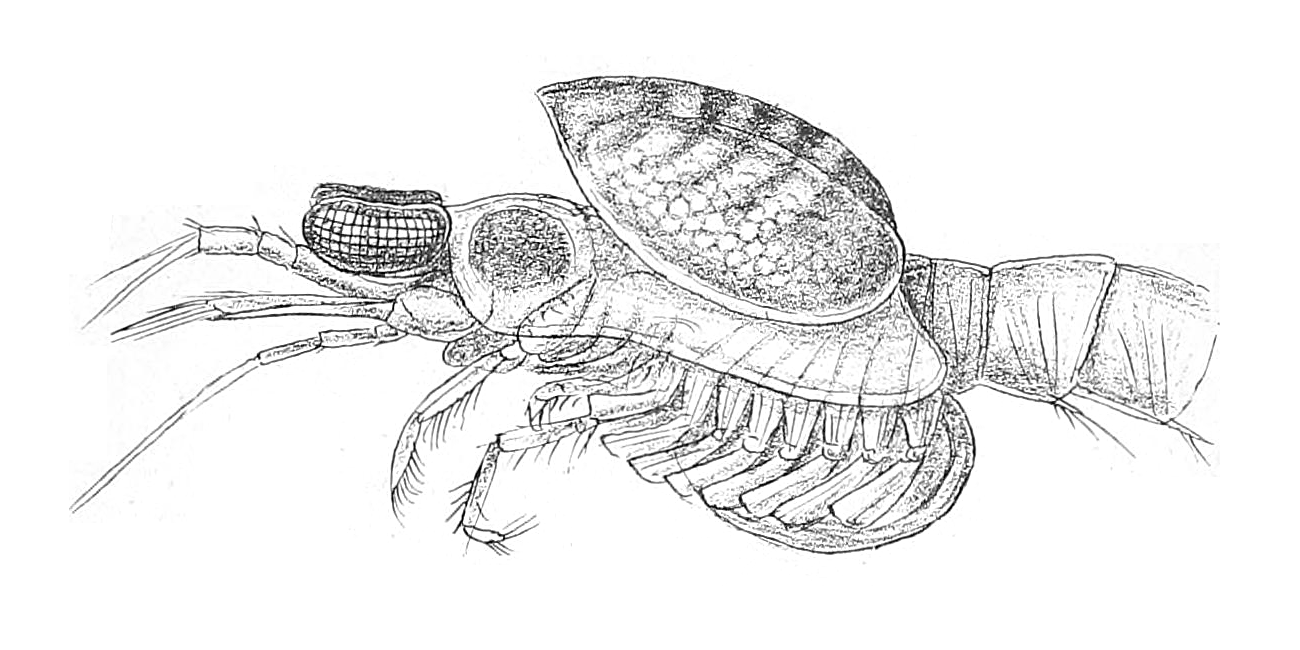
- Aspidophryxus peltatus female infested mysid Erythrops

Scientific classification
- Kingdom: Animalia
- Phylum: Arthropoda
- Clade: Pancrustacea
- Class: Malacostraca
- Order: Isopoda
- Suborder: Cymothoida
- Infraorder: Epicaridea
- Superfamily: Cryptoniscoidea
- Family: Dajidae; Giard & Bonnier, 1887

Genera
- see text

= Dajidae =

Family of crustaceans

The Dajidae are a family of marine isopod crustaceans in the suborder Cymothoida. The original description was made by Giard and Bonnier in 1887. Members of this family are ectoparasites of krill. They resemble a fleshy growth on the krill's back, and make the host look as if it is wearing a rucksack. These genera are included in the family Dajidae:

- Allophryxus Koehler, 1911
- Antephyra Schultz, 1978
- Arthrophryxus Richardson, 1908
- Aspidophryxus G. O. Sars, 1883
- Branchiophryxus Caullery, 1897
- Colophryxus Richardson, 1908
- Dajus Krøyer, 1846
- Dolichophryxus Schultz, 1977
- Heterophryxus G. O. Sars, 1885
- Holophryxus Richardson, 1905
- Notophryxus G. O. Sars, 1883
- Oculophryxus Shields & Gómez-Gutiérrez, 1996
- Paradajus Nierstrasz & Brender à Brandis, 1923
- Paraspidophryxus Schultz, 1977
- Prodajus Bonnier, 1903
- Prophryxus Richardson, 1909
- Streptodajus Nierstrasz & Brender à Brandis, 1923
- Zonophryxus Richardson, 1903
