= Corallanidae =

Scientific classification
- Kingdom: Animalia
- Phylum: Arthropoda
- Class: Malacostraca
- Order: Isopoda
- Superfamily: Cymothooidea
- Family: Corallanidae

Family of crustaceans

Corallanidae is a family of crustaceans belonging to the order Isopoda.

Genera:

- Alcirona Hansen, 1890
- Argathona Stebbing, 1905
- Corallana Dana, 1853
- Corilana Kossman, 1880
- Excorallana Stebbing, 1904
- Lanocira Hansen, 1890
- Tachaea Schioedte & Meinert, 1879
