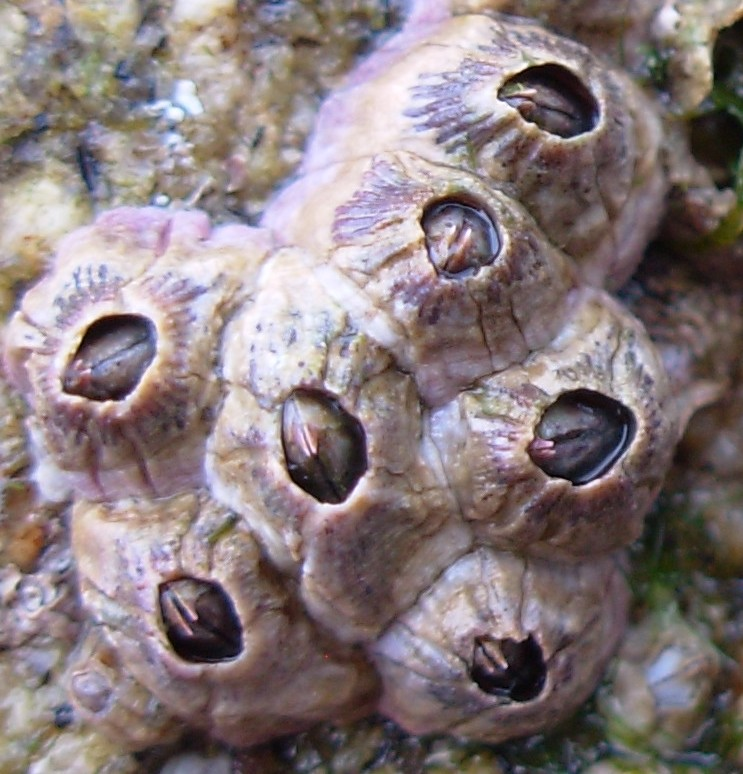

Scientific classification
- Kingdom: Animalia
- Phylum: Arthropoda
- Clade: Pancrustacea
- Class: Thecostraca
- Subclass: Cirripedia
- Order: Balanomorpha
- Family: Balanidae
- Genus: Perforatus
- Species: P. perforatus

Binomial name
- Perforatus perforatus (Bruguière, 1789)

Synonyms
- Balanus perforatus Bruguière, 1789

= Perforatus perforatus =

Species of barnacle

Perforatus perforatus is a species of barnacle in the family Balanidae. It is found on the lower shore and in the neritic zone in the warm temperate parts of the eastern Atlantic Ocean.

== Description ==
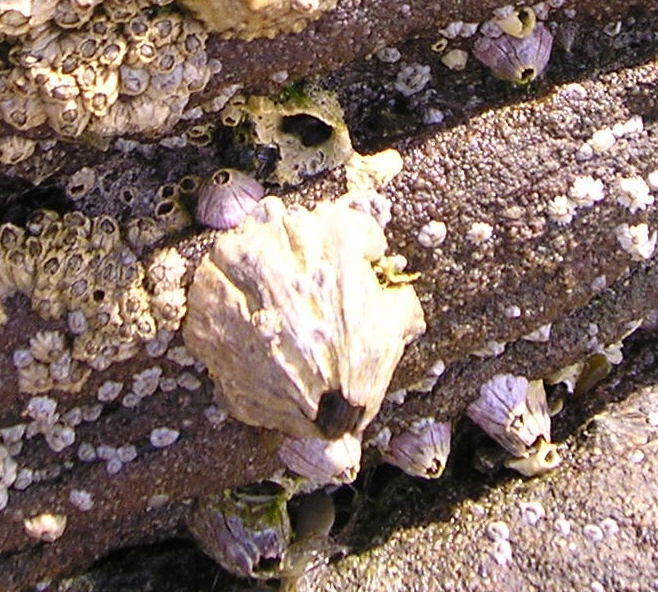
Perforatus perforatus

Perforatus perforatus is a large barnacle which grows up to 30 millimetres (1.2 in) in both diameter and height. Its shape resembles a volcano with steep sloping sides. The six fused lateral calcareous plates are pale purplish-brown and often ridged vertically. They often separate near the top leaving jagged ridges. Tissue inside the operculum is brightly coloured. Two pairs of moveable plates cover the operculum which can be sealed by a purplish-brown flap when the barnacle is exposed above water or it is not feeding.

== Distribution ==
Perforatus perforatus is found on coastlines along the eastern side of the Atlantic Ocean including the Mediterranean Sea and the English Channel. Its most northerly extent is in southern areas of England and Wales, and at this limit of its range it can be greatly affected by severe winters. It has been expanding its range with the rises in temperature that have been occurring in recent decades. It is found on rocks and man-made structures from mid-shore to the neritic zone and also forms part of the fouling community on the hulls of ships.

== Biology ==
When submerged, P. perforatus extends its cirri and beats then rhythmically at a rate of between two and twenty-four beats per ten seconds. The cirri are less extended when the beat rate is faster. It feeds on plankton and as well as catching food particles, it pumps water through its mantle cavity. The faster the beating, the more water is pumped and the volume may reach one litre per hour. Slow beat rates are linked to pauses while the cirri are retracted rather than a reduction in the speed of movement of the cirri. P. perforatus is well adapted to life as an efficient current-producing suspension feeder.

Breeding takes place between May and September in the English Channel when the quantity of planktonic food for the larvae is at its greatest. Initially the larvae are brooded by the adult and after their first moult are released into the water column. There are five further nauplius stages during which the larvae feed, grow, moult, drift with the currents and form part of the zooplankton. The last stage cyprid larvae then settle out and attach themselves to a suitable substrate.

== Ecology ==
In the habitats occupied by P. perforatus it is often associated with sponges and encrusting red seaweeds on shady overhanging rocks and cave entrances and also bryozoans and ascidians in deeper shade.

The isopod crustacean Crinoniscus equitans is an ectoparasite of P. perforatus. Another isopod crustacean, Naesa bidentata, normally lives in rock crevices and under seaweed and stones but with the spread of P. perforatus, it has adopted the empty shells of the barnacle as its home.
