= Calabozoidae =

Scientific classification
- Kingdom: Animalia
- Phylum: Arthropoda
- Clade: Pancrustacea
- Class: Malacostraca
- Order: Isopoda
- Suborder: Calabozoidea
- Family: Calabozoidae; Van Lieshout, 1983

Genera
- Calabozoa Van Lieshout, 1983; Pongycarcinia Messana, Baratti & Benvenuti, 2002

Family of crustaceans

Pongycarcinia xiphidiourus

The Calabozoidae are a family of freshwater isopod crustaceans in suborder Calabozoidea (or Calabozoida). It comprises two genera, Calabazoa and Pongycarcina.
