= Epicaridea =

Scientific classification
- Kingdom: Animalia
- Phylum: Arthropoda
- Clade: Pancrustacea
- Class: Malacostraca
- Order: Isopoda
- Suborder: Epicaridea; Latreille, 1831

Superfamilies
- Bopyroidea Rafinesque, 1815; Cryptoniscoidea Kossmann, 1880

Suborder of crustaceans

Epicaridea is a suborder of isopod crustaceans that are ectoparasites on other crustaceans. Most species appear very dissimilar to other isopods due to their highly derived morphology.

== Description ==
There is a high degree of sexual dimorphism within epicarideans. The female is commonly very asymmetrical, often losing segmentation. Two pairs of rudimentary antennae are carried on the head. Mouthparts show little development, with only mandibles and maxillipeds present, sometimes with a second pair of rudimentary maxillae. Males are of smaller size than females and of different appearance. Development is through regressive metamorphosis, undergoing two or three larval stages.

== Ecology ==
Members of Epicaridea are ectoparasites, mesoparasites, and endoparasitess on various crustacean groups, including decapods, thecostracan barnacles, ostracods, amphipods, cumaceans and even other isopods depending on the family. Epicarideans exhibit a complex 4-part life cycle, with a free-swimming epicaridium stage, a mesoniscus stage ectoparasitic on copepods, a free-swimming cryptoniscus stage and an adult stage with a highly derived female and a simplified or paedomorphic male.

== Evolution ==
The oldest trace fossils of epicarideans, comprising preserved damage to gills of fossilised crustaceans, goes back to the Late Jurassic, and a lost specimen from the Toarcian of Western New Guinea suggests that it may go back further to the Early Jurassic. Fossil epicaridean larvae are known from the Vendée amber of France and the Burmese amber of Myanmar, dating to the early Late Cretaceous, and also from Miocene aged Chiapas amber.

== Classification ==
Eleven families are currently recognised within the suborder Epicaridea, divided into two superfamilies.

- Superfamily Bopyroidea Rafinesque, 1815
  - Bopyridae Rafinesque, 1815
  - Colypuridae Richardson, 1905
  - Entoniscidae Kossmann, 1881
  - Ionidae H. Milne Edwards, 1840
- Superfamily Cryptoniscoidea Kossmann, 1880
  - Asconiscidae Bonnier, 1900
  - Cabiropidae Giard & Bonnier, 1887
  - Capitoniscidae Boyko & Williams, 2023
  - Crinoniscidae Bonnier, 1900
  - Cryptoniscidae Kossmann, 1880
  - Cumoechidae Boyko & Williams, 2023
  - Cyproniscidae Giard & Bonnier, 1887
  - Dajidae G. O. Sars, 1883
  - Entophilidae Richardson, 1903
  - Hemioniscidae Bonnier, 1900
  - Podasconidae Giard & Bonnier, 1895
  - Stellatoniscidae Oanh & Boyko, 2020

Epicaridea was traditionally placed as a suborder, but in 2003 it was subsumed as an infraorder into Cymothoida. In 2022, a molecular study found Epicaridea to be it unrelated to Cymothoida, and the group has been reverted to suborder status.
