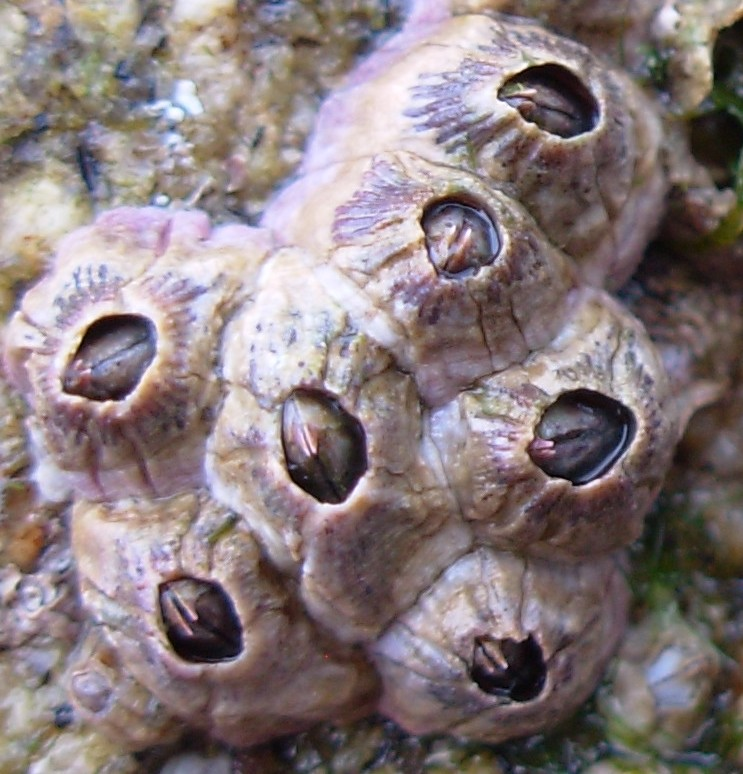
- Perforatus perforatus, volcano barnacle

Scientific classification
- Kingdom: Animalia
- Phylum: Arthropoda
- Class: Thecostraca
- Subclass: Cirripedia
- Order: Balanomorpha
- Family: Balanidae
- Genus: Perforatus; Pitombo, 2004
- Species: P. perforatus

Binomial name
- Perforatus perforatus (Bruguière, 1789)

= Perforatus =

Genus of crustaceans

Perforatus (South European acorn barnacle, Red-striped acorn barnacle) is a genus of acorn barnacles in the family Balanidae. There is one described species in Perforatus, P. perforanus. from Mykonos Island, Greece
