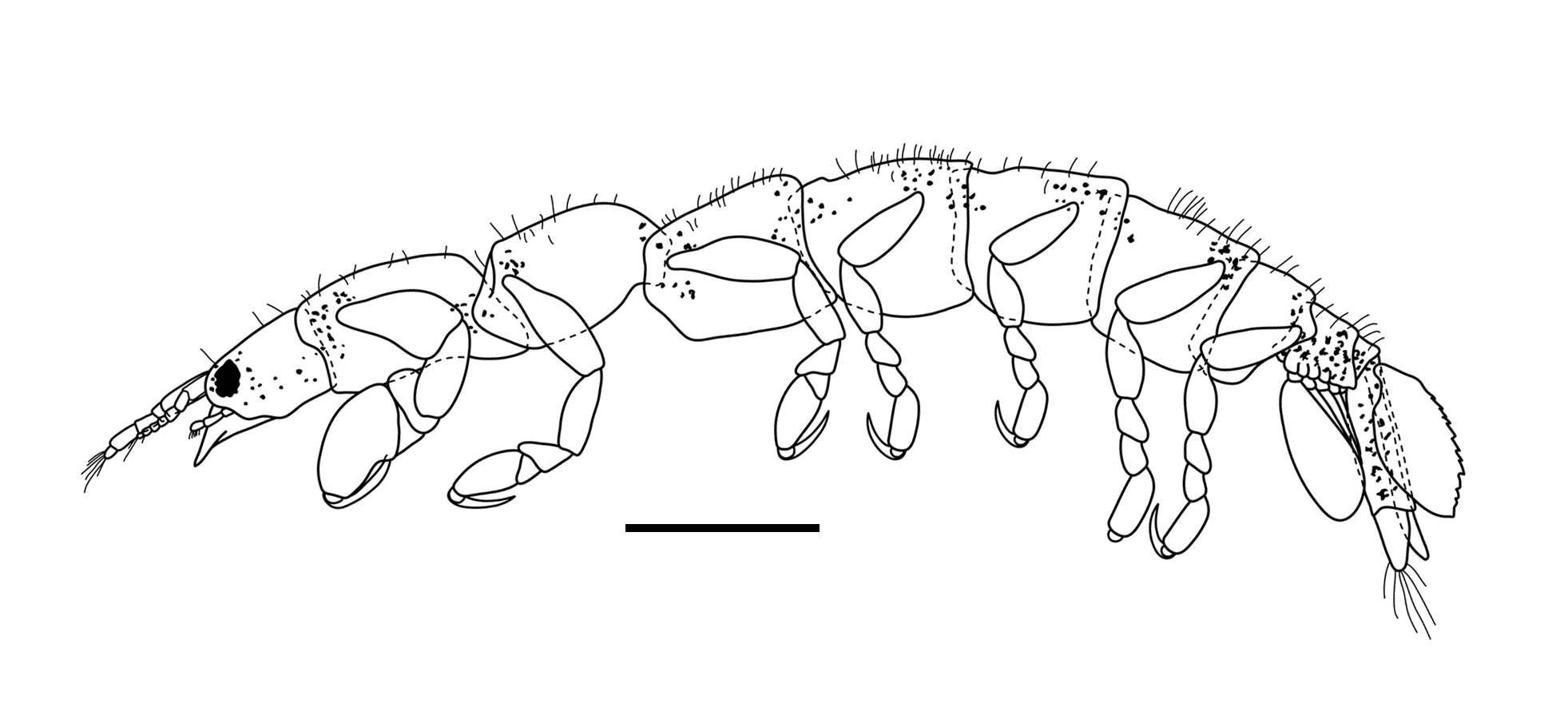
- Paranthura astrolabium

Scientific classification
- Kingdom: Animalia
- Phylum: Arthropoda
- Class: Malacostraca
- Order: Isopoda
- Superfamily: Anthuroidea
- Family: Paranthuridae

= Paranthuridae =

Family of crustaceans

Paranthuridae is a family of crustaceans belonging to the order Isopoda.

Genera:

- Califanthura Schultz, 1977
- Colanthura Richardson, 1902
- Cruranthura Thomson, 1946
- Cruregens Chilton, 1882
- Paranthura Bate & Westwood, 1866
- Pseudanthura Richardson, 1911
