= Phoratopus =

Scientific classification
- Kingdom: Animalia
- Phylum: Arthropoda
- Clade: Pancrustacea
- Class: Malacostraca
- Order: Isopoda
- Suborder: Phoratopidea; Brandt & Poore, 2003
- Family: Phoratopodidae; Hale, 1925
- Genus: Phoratopus; Hale, 1925
- Species: P. remex

Binomial name
- Phoratopus remex Hale, 1925

Genus of crustaceans

Phoratopus remex is a species of isopod crustaceans known from only two specimens, and first described in 1925 by Herbert Matthew Hale (1895–1963). It lives on the continental shelf at Encounter Bay and Fowlers Bay, South Australia. Unlike all other Isopods, it is placed in its own family, Phoratopodidae and suborder, Phoratopidea.
