= Expanathuridae =

Scientific classification
- Kingdom: Animalia
- Phylum: Arthropoda
- Class: Malacostraca
- Order: Isopoda
- Superfamily: Anthuroidea
- Family: Expanathuridae

Family of crustaceans

Expanathuridae is a family of crustaceans belonging to the order Isopoda.

Genera:

- Coralanthura Poore & Kensley, 1981
- Eisothistos Haswell, 1884
- Expanathura Wägele, 1981
- Heptanthura Kensley, 1978
- Minyanthura Kensley, 1982
- Panathura Barnard, 1925
- Rhiganthura Kensley, 1978
