= Antheluridae =

Scientific classification
- Kingdom: Animalia
- Phylum: Arthropoda
- Class: Malacostraca
- Order: Isopoda
- Superfamily: Anthuroidea
- Family: Antheluridae

Family of crustaceans

Antheluridae is a family of crustaceans belonging to the order Isopoda.

Genera:

- Ananthura Barnard, 1925
- Anthelura Norman & Stebbing, 1886
- Anthomuda Schultz, 1979
