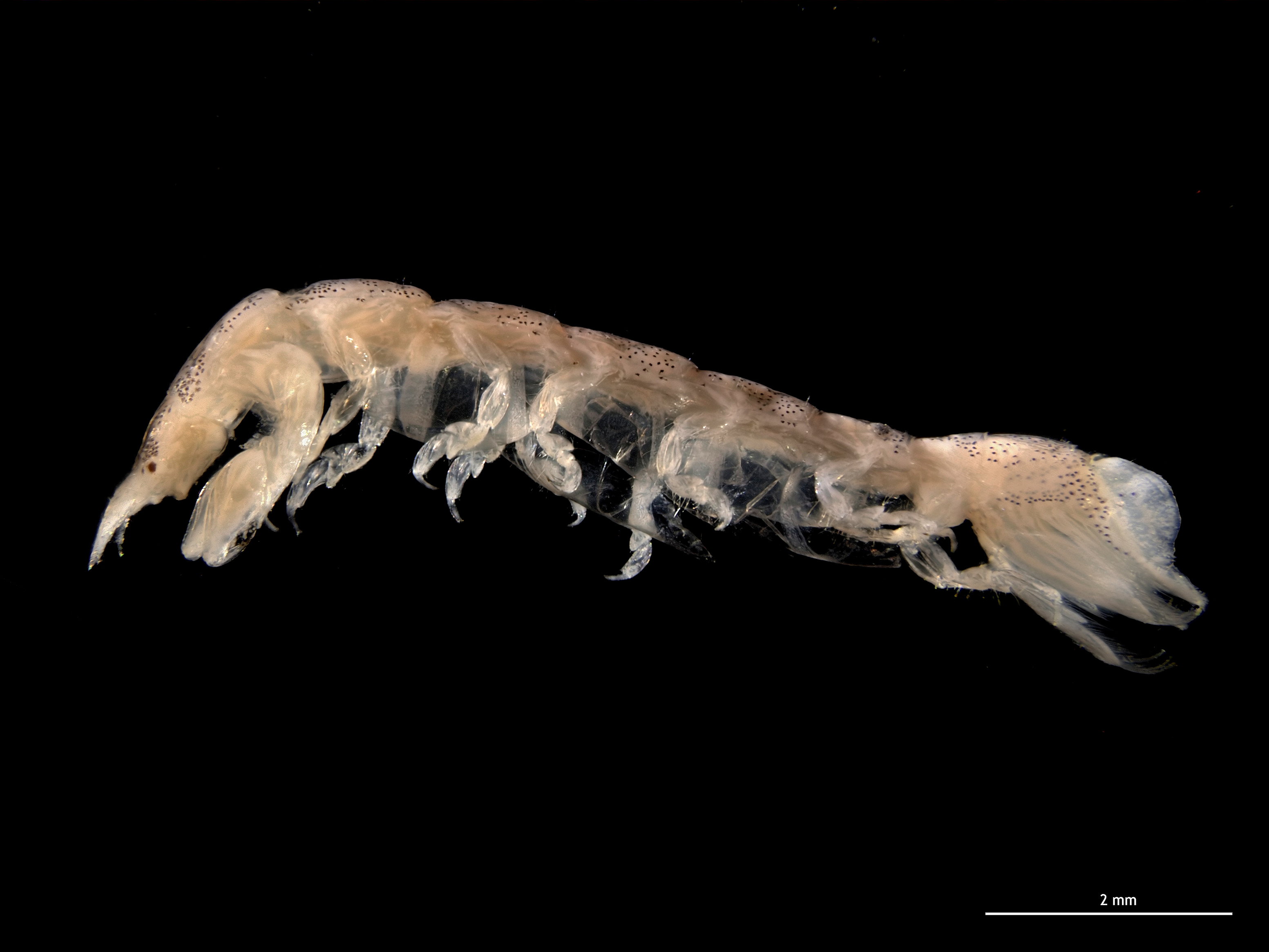
- Cyathura carinata

Scientific classification
- Kingdom: Animalia
- Phylum: Arthropoda
- Class: Malacostraca
- Order: Isopoda
- Superfamily: Anthuroidea
- Family: Anthuridae

= Anthuridae =

Family of crustaceans

Anthuridae is a family of isopods belonging to the order Isopoda.

== Genera ==
Genera:

- Amakusanthura Nunomura, 1977
- Anthura Leach, 1814
- Apanthura Stebbing, 1900
- Apanthuroides Menzies & Glynn, 1968
- Apanthuropsis Poore & Lew Ton, 1985
- Caenanthura Kensley, 1978
- Cetanthura Kensley, 1982
- Chelanthura Poore & Bardsley, 1990
- Cortezura Schultz, 1977
- Cyathura Norman & Stebbing, 1886
- Exallanthura Kensley, 1980
- Haliophasma Haswell, 1881
- Indanthura Pillai & Eapen, 1966
- Leipanthura Poore, 2009
- Malacanthura Barnard, 1925
- Mesanthura Barnard, 1914
- Nemanthura Wägele, 1981
- Notanthura Monod, 1927
- Pendanthura Menzies & Glynn, 1968
- Pilosanthura Wägele, 1989
- Ptilanthura Harger, 1878
- Quantanthura Menzies & George, 1972
- Sauranthura Poore & Kensley, 1981
- Skuphonura Barnard, 1925
- Stygocyathura Botosaneanu & Stock, 1982
- Tinggianthura Chew, Rahim & bin Haji Ross, 2014
- Apanthuretta Wägele, 1981
