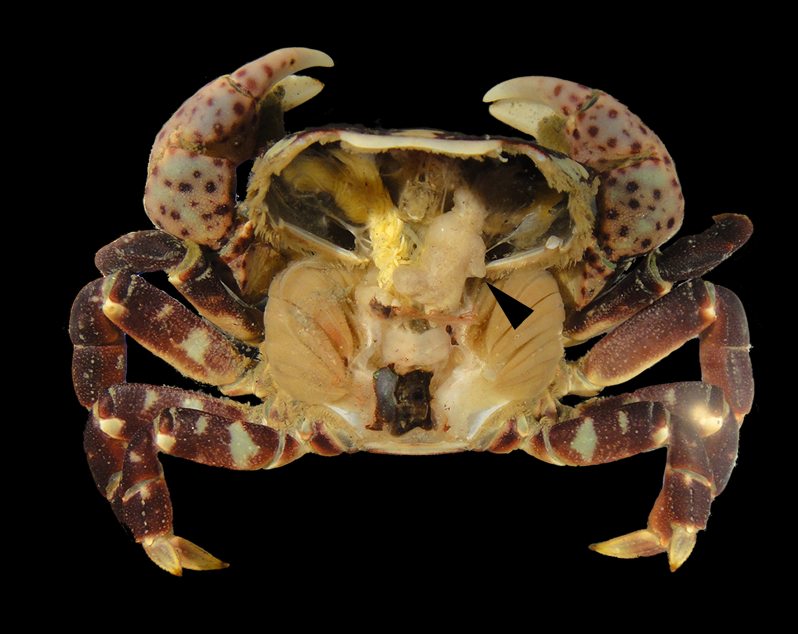
- Portunion conformis (black pointer) within the body cavity of the crab Hemigrapsus nudus

Scientific classification
- Kingdom: Animalia
- Phylum: Arthropoda
- Clade: Pancrustacea
- Class: Malacostraca
- Order: Isopoda
- Suborder: Cymothoida
- Infraorder: Epicaridea
- Superfamily: Bopyroidea
- Family: Entoniscidae; Kossmann, 1881

Genera
- see text

= Entoniscidae =

Family of crustaceans

The Entoniscidae are a family of marine isopod crustaceans in the suborder Cymothoida. Members of this family are parasites of brachyuran and anomuran crabs, living in their hosts' haemocoel. A small chitinised hole develops through the host's exoskeleton through which the isopod can communicate with the environment. The female isopod bears little resemblance to any free-living isopod, but the morphology of the larvae show their taxonomic affiliations.

== Genera ==
- Achelion Hartnoll, 1966
- Cancrion Giard & Bonnier, 1886
- Diogenion Codreanu, Codreanu & Pike, 1960
- Entione Kossmann, 1881
- Entionella Miyashita, 1941
- Entoniscoides Miyashita, 1940
- Entoniscus Müller, 1862
- Grapsion Giard & Bonnier, 1886
- Micippion Shiino, 1942
- Paguritherium Reinhard, 1945
- Pinnotherion Giard & Bonnier, 1889
- Portunion Giard & Bonnier, 1886
- Priapion Giard & Bonnier, 1888
- Synalpheion Coutière, 1908
- Tiarinion Shiino, 1942
- Xanthion Shiino, 1942
