= Calabozoidea =

Scientific classification
- Domain: Eukaryota
- Kingdom: Animalia
- Phylum: Arthropoda
- Class: Malacostraca
- Order: Isopoda
- Suborder: Calabozoidea; Van Lieshout, 1983

Families
- Brasileirinidae; Calabozoidae

Suborder of crustaceans

The Calabozoidea or Calabozoida are a suborder of freshwater isopod crustaceans.

== Families ==
The suborder contains two families:

- Family Brasileirinidae Pervorčnik, Ferreira & Sket, 2012
- Family Calabozoidae Van Lieshout, 1983
