= Hyssuridae =

Scientific classification
- Kingdom: Animalia
- Phylum: Arthropoda
- Class: Malacostraca
- Order: Isopoda
- Superfamily: Anthuroidea
- Family: Hyssuridae

Family of crustaceans

Hyssuridae is a family of crustaceans belonging to the order Isopoda.

Genera:

- Belura Poore & Lew Ton, 1988
- Galziniella Müller, 1991
- Hyssura Norman & Stebbing, 1886
- Kupellonura Barnard, 1925
- Neohyssura Amar, 1953
- Xenanthura Barnard, 1925
