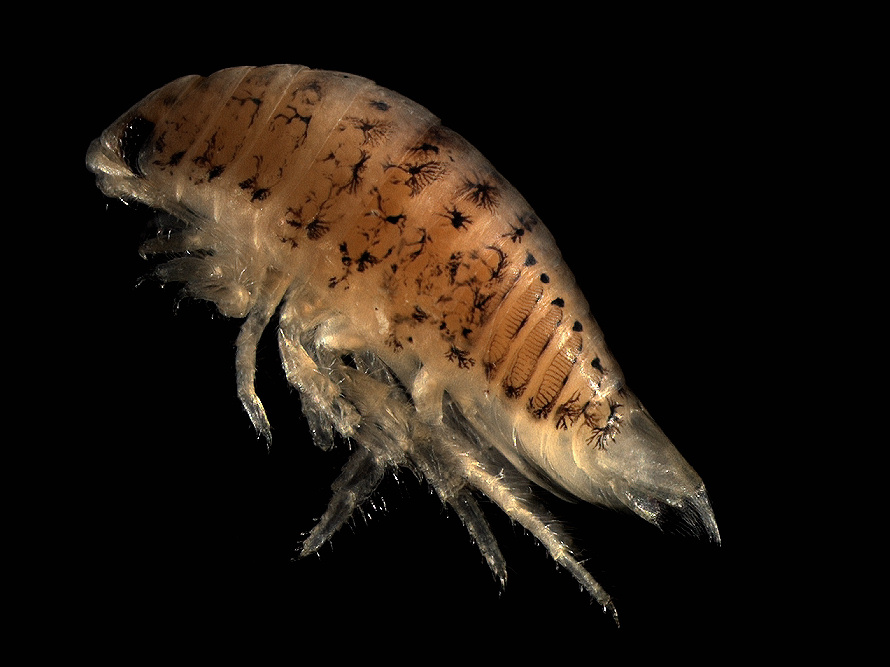
- Eurydice pulchra, a carnivorous isopod found on sandy shores

Scientific classification
- Kingdom: Animalia
- Phylum: Arthropoda
- Clade: Pancrustacea
- Class: Malacostraca
- Superorder: Peracarida
- Order: Isopoda; Latreille, 1817

Suborders
- Asellota; Calabozoida; Cymothoida; Epicaridea; Limnoriidea; Oniscidea; Phoratopidea; Phreatoicidea; Sphaeromatidea; Tainisopidea; Valvifera

= Isopoda =

Isopoda Temporal range: Carboniferous to present 300–0 Ma

Order of arthropods

Isopoda is an order of crustaceans, commonly referred to as isopods. The order contains over 11,000 species occurring in marine, freshwater and terrestrial environments. All have rigid, segmented exoskeletons, two pairs of antennae, seven pairs of jointed limbs on the thorax, (Note: Though the family Gnathiidae only has five pairs of limbs on the thorax.) and five pairs of branching appendages on the abdomen that are used in respiration. Females brood their young in a pouch under their thorax called the marsupium.

Isopods have various feeding methods: some are scavengers and detritivores, eating dead or decaying plant and animal matter; others are grazers or filter feeders, a few are predators, and many are internal or external parasites of fish and crustaceans. Aquatic species are mostly benthic, living on the bottom of water bodies, but some taxa can swim for short distances. Terrestrial forms move around by crawling and tend to be found in cool, moist places. Many species, such as those in the families Armadillidae and Armadillidiidae, have convergently evolved the ability to roll into a ball (known as conglobulation or volvation) as a defense mechanism or to conserve moisture.

There are over 11,000 described species of isopods worldwide, with around 4,500 species found in marine environments (mostly on the seabed), 500 species in fresh water, and another nearly 4,400 species on land. The order is divided into eleven suborders. There are purported fossils extending back to the Pennsylvanian epoch of the Carboniferous, although the identity of many Paleozoic fossils is disputed and the fossil record of many isopod suborders (including the suborder containing all terrestrial species) does not begin until the Mesozoic.

== Etymology ==
The name Isopoda is derived from the Greek roots iso- (from ἴσος ísos, meaning "equal") and -pod (from ποδ-, the stem of πούς poús, genitive ποδός podós, meaning "foot"). This refers to the fact that they usually have seven pairs of similarly shaped legs, although some isopods have differentiated legs such as some asellotes and gnathiids.

== Description ==
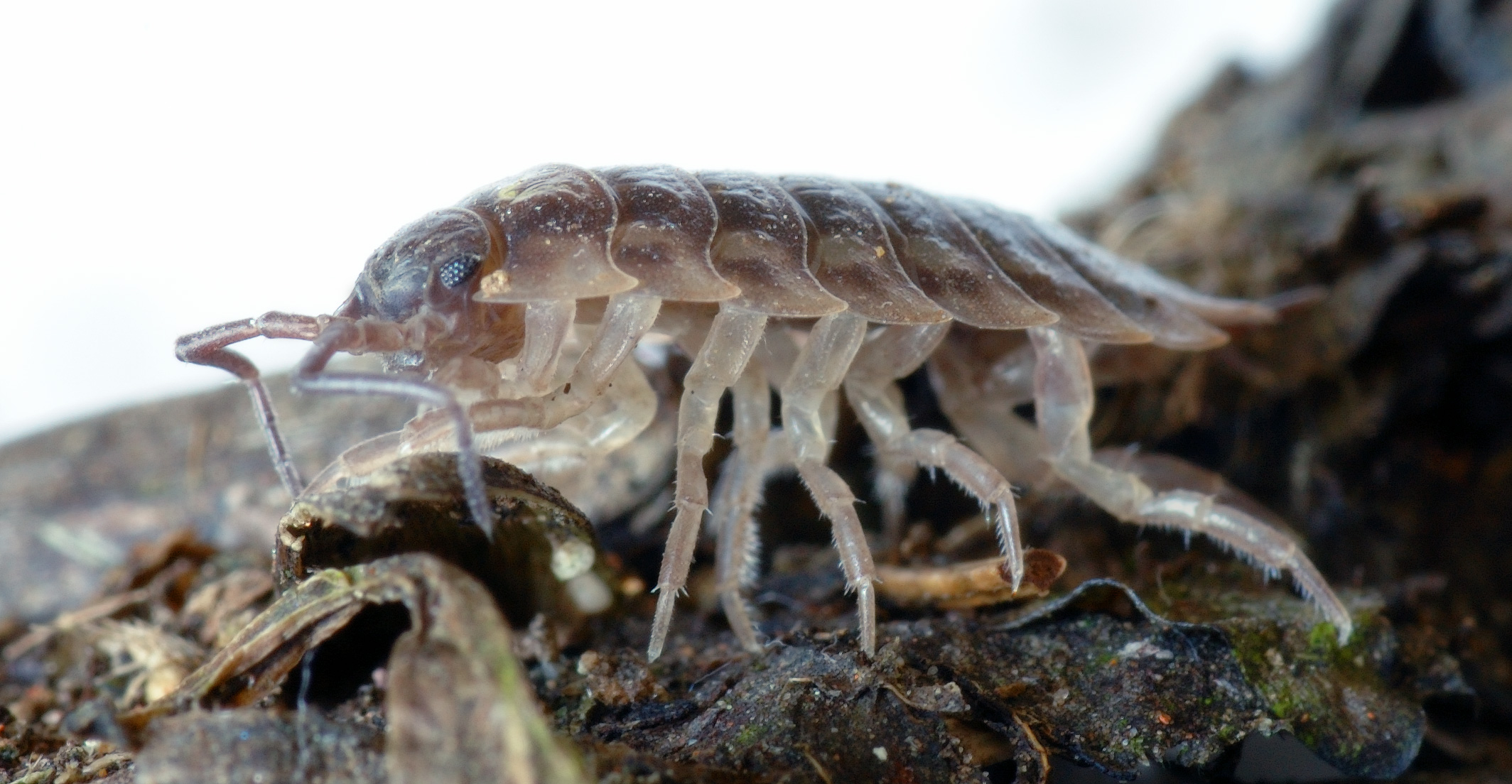
The woodlouse Oniscus asellus showing the head with eyes and antennae, and relatively uniform limbs

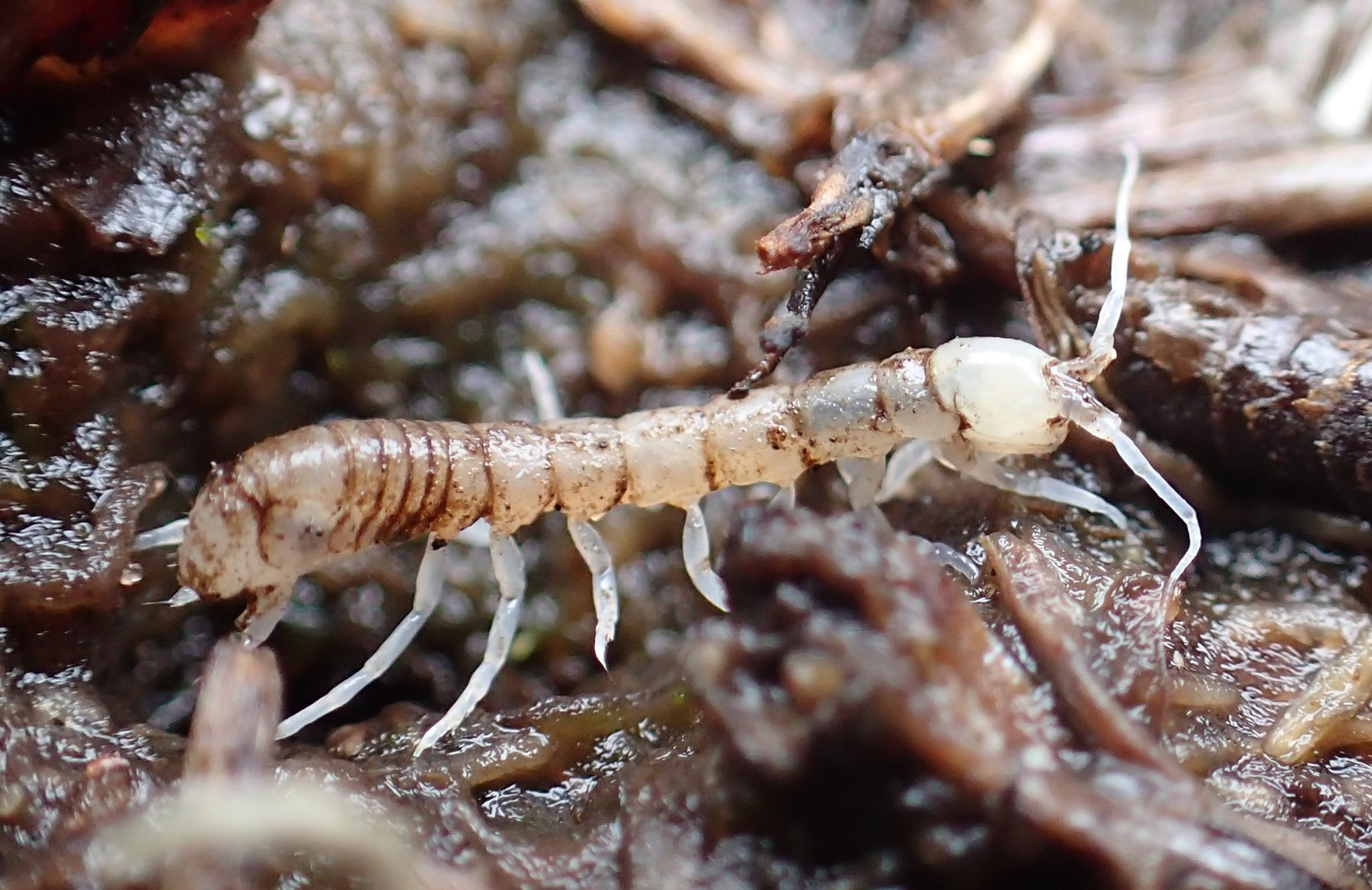
A phreatoicidean isopod, from Australia

As arthropods, isopods have a chitinous exoskeleton and jointed limbs. Isopods are commonly flattened dorsoventrally (broader than they are deep), although this is not always the case. Isopods vary in size, ranging from some Microcerberidae species measuring just .3 millimetres (0.012 in) to the deep sea giant isopods in the genus Bathynomus of nearly 50 cm (20 in). Unlike their close relatives, the cumaceans and tanaids, isopods lack a carapace, with respiration occurring through the rear appendages of the abdomen (pleon).

The dorsal (upper) surface of the animal is covered by a series of overlapping, articulated plates, called tergites, which give protection while also providing flexibility. The isopod body plan consists of a head (cephalon), a thorax (pereon) with seven segments (pereonites), and an abdomen (pleon) with six segments (pleonites), some of which may be fused. The head is fused with the first segment of the thorax to form the cephalon. There are two pairs of antennae, the first pair being vestigial in land-dwelling species. The eyes are compound and unstalked and there are four sets of jaws including a pair of mandibles (jaws) with palps (segmented appendages with sensory functions) and lacinia mobilis (spine-like movable appendages), and the original first pair of legs modified into maxillipeds.

The seven free segments of the thorax each bear a pair of unbranched pereopods (limbs). In most species these are used for locomotion and are of much the same size. In a some taxa, the front pair are modified into gnathopods with clawed, gripping terminal segments. The pereopods are not used in respiration, as are the equivalent limbs in amphipods. In many isopods, the coxae (first segments) are fused to the tergites (dorsal plates) to form epimera (side plates). In mature females, some or all of the limbs have appendages known as oostegites which fold underneath the thorax and form a brood chamber for the eggs. In males, the gonopores (genital openings) are on the ventral surface of thorax segment eight (pereon segment 7) and in the females, they are in a similar position on segment six.

One or more of the abdominal segments, starting with the sixth segment, is fused to the telson (terminal section) to form a rigid pleotelson. The first five abdominal segments each bear a pair of biramous (branching in two) pleopods (lamellar structures which serve the function of gas exchange, and in aquatic species serve as gills and propulsion), and the last segment bears a pair of biramous uropods (posterior limbs). In males, the second pair of pleopods, and sometimes also the first, are modified into sexual organs for use in transferring sperm. The endopods (inner branches of the pleopods) are modified into structures with thin, permeable cuticles (flexible outer coverings) which act as gills for gas exchange. In some terrestrial isopods, these resemble lungs.

== Diversity and classification ==
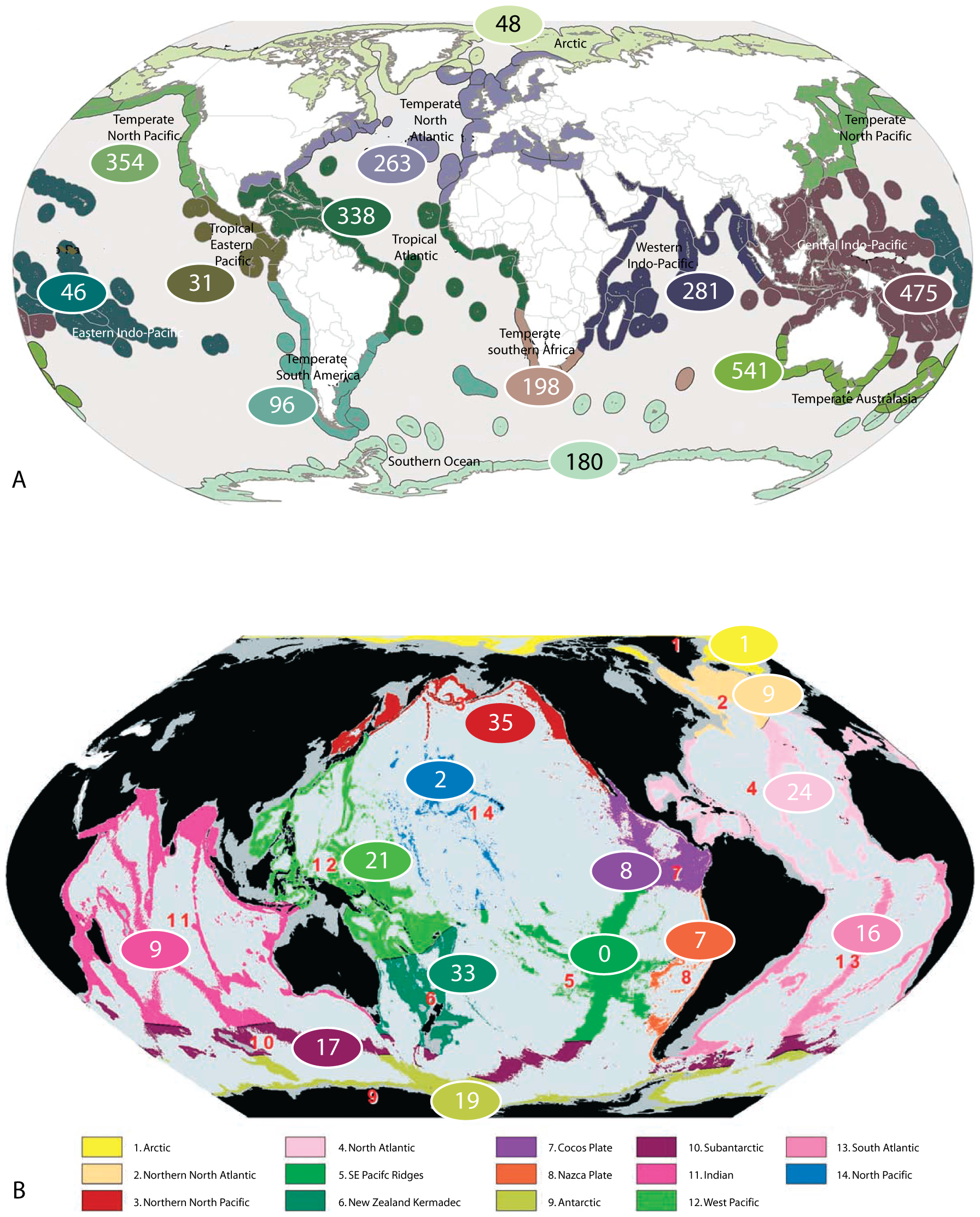
Numbers of marine Isopoda (except Asellota and crustacean symbionts) in biogeographic regions

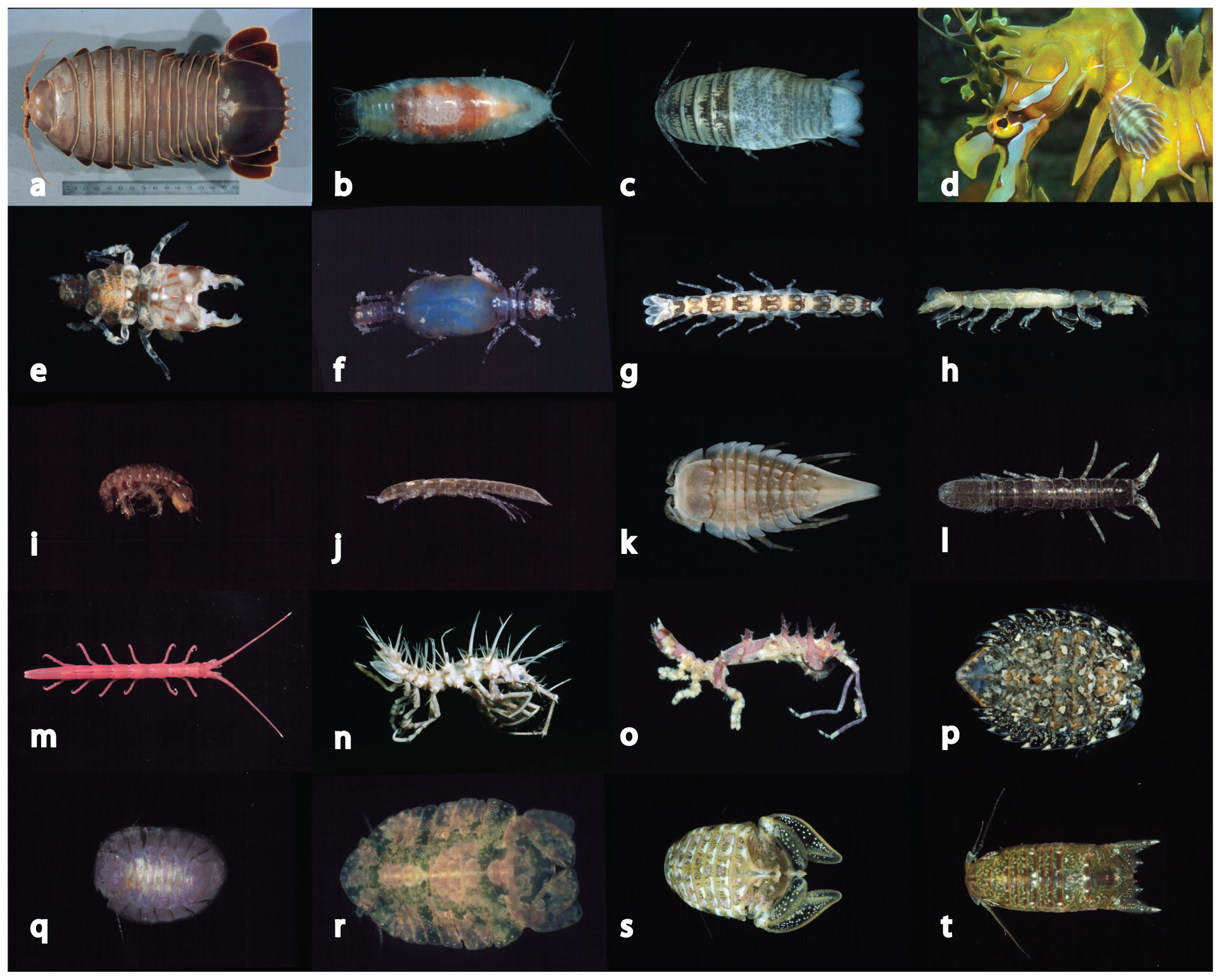
Representative marine isopod forms

Isopods belong to the larger group Peracarida, which are united by the presence of a special chamber under the thorax for brooding eggs. They are closest to the orders Cumacea and Tanaidacea and less closely to Mictacea and Spelaeogriphacea, which share a unique manca stage and together form the clade Mancoidea. A 2025 transcriptomic study placed Isopoda in a phylogeny with the rest of Peracarida as shown below:

- Mysidacea
- - - Thermosbaenacea
    - - Amphipoda
      - Ingolfiellida
  - Panmancoidea
    - Spelaeogriphacea
    - - Mictacea
      - Mancoidea sensu stricto
        - Tanaidacea
        - - Cumacea
          - Isopoda

Isopods have a cosmopolitan distribution with over 11,000 species of isopods, classified into 11 suborders, have been described worldwide. Around 4,500 species are found in marine environments, mostly on the sea floor. About 500 species are found in fresh water and another nearly 4,400 species are terrestrial, which form the suborder Oniscidea. In the deep sea, members of the suborder Asellota predominate, to the near exclusion of all other isopods, having undergone a large adaptive radiation in that environment. The largest isopod is in the genus Bathynomus and some large species are fished commercially for human food in Mexico and Japan.

Some isopod groups have evolved a parasitic lifestyle, as external parasites of fish and crustaceans. They can damage or kill their hosts and can cause significant economic loss to commercial fisheries. In reef aquariums, parasitic isopods can become a pest, endangering the fish and possibly injuring the aquarium keeper. Some members of the family Cirolanidae suck the blood of fish, and others, in the family Aegidae, consume the blood, fins, tail and flesh and can kill the fish in the process.

=== Taxonomy ===
The World Marine, Freshwater and Terrestrial Isopod Crustaceans database subdivides the order into eleven suborders:

- Asellota – This suborder contains the superfamily Aselloidea, a group that contains most of the freshwater isopods in the Northern Hemisphere, and the superfamilies Stenetrioidea, Gnathostenetroidoidea and Janiroidea, which are mostly marine. Janiroidea experienced a massive radiation in deep-sea ecosystems, with many families having taken bizarre forms. The suborder Microcerberidea was previously considered separate but closely related to Asellota but a 2026 study found that the two component families (Microcerberidae and Atlantasellidae) are closer related to some asellotes than to others, resulting in that suborder being synonymised into Asellota.
- Calabozoida – A small suborder consisting of multiple stygiobiont species endemic to South America consisting of the two families Calabozoidae and Basileirinidae.
- Cymothoida – Chiefly marine isopods with over 2,700 species. Members are mostly carnivorous or parasitic. The core of the former suborder Flabellifera with a convoluted taxonomic history. Formerly contained the suborder Epicaridea, which was traditionally independent and was officially re-instated in 2024. There is also evidence that the parasitic family Gnathiidae and the worm-like superfamily Anthuroidea may also separate suborders as well.
- Limnoriidea – Mainly tropical marine isopods, the main family, the Gribbles, are borers in submerged wood and seaweeds.
- Oniscidea – Semi-terrestrial and terrestrial isopods fully adapted for life on land. There are over 4,000 species of oniscid woodlice inhabiting forests, mountains, deserts and the littoral zone.
- Phoratopidea – A single marine species, Phoratopus remex, which warrants its own suborder because of its unique characteristics.
- Phreatoicidea – Small suborder of freshwater isopods resembling amphipods, limited to South Africa, India, Australia and New Zealand.
- Sphaeromatidea – Benthic isopods mostly from the Southern Hemisphere with respiratory pleopods inside a branchial chamber. This suborder now includes part of the formerly recognised suborder Flabellifera.
- Tainisopidea – Freshwater isopods endemic subterranean aquifers in Western Australia.
- Valvifera – A large group of benthic, marine isopods with respiratory pleopods inside a branchial chamber under the abdomen.

A 2024 genomics study created the following tree for isopod suborders:

- Outgroup
  Tanaidacea
- Isopoda
  - Asellota (including Microcerberidea)
  - - Phreatoicidea
    - Scutocoxifera
      - Epicaridea
      - - - Anthuriidea
          - Gnathiidea
        - - - CLVS
              - - Sphaeromatidea
                - Valvifera
              - - Limnoriidea
                - Cymothoida (excluding Epicaridea, Anthuridea and Gnathiidea)
            - Tainisopidea
          - Oniscidea

The suborders Phoratopidea and Calabozoidea were not included due to the lack of data.

=== Evolutionary history ===
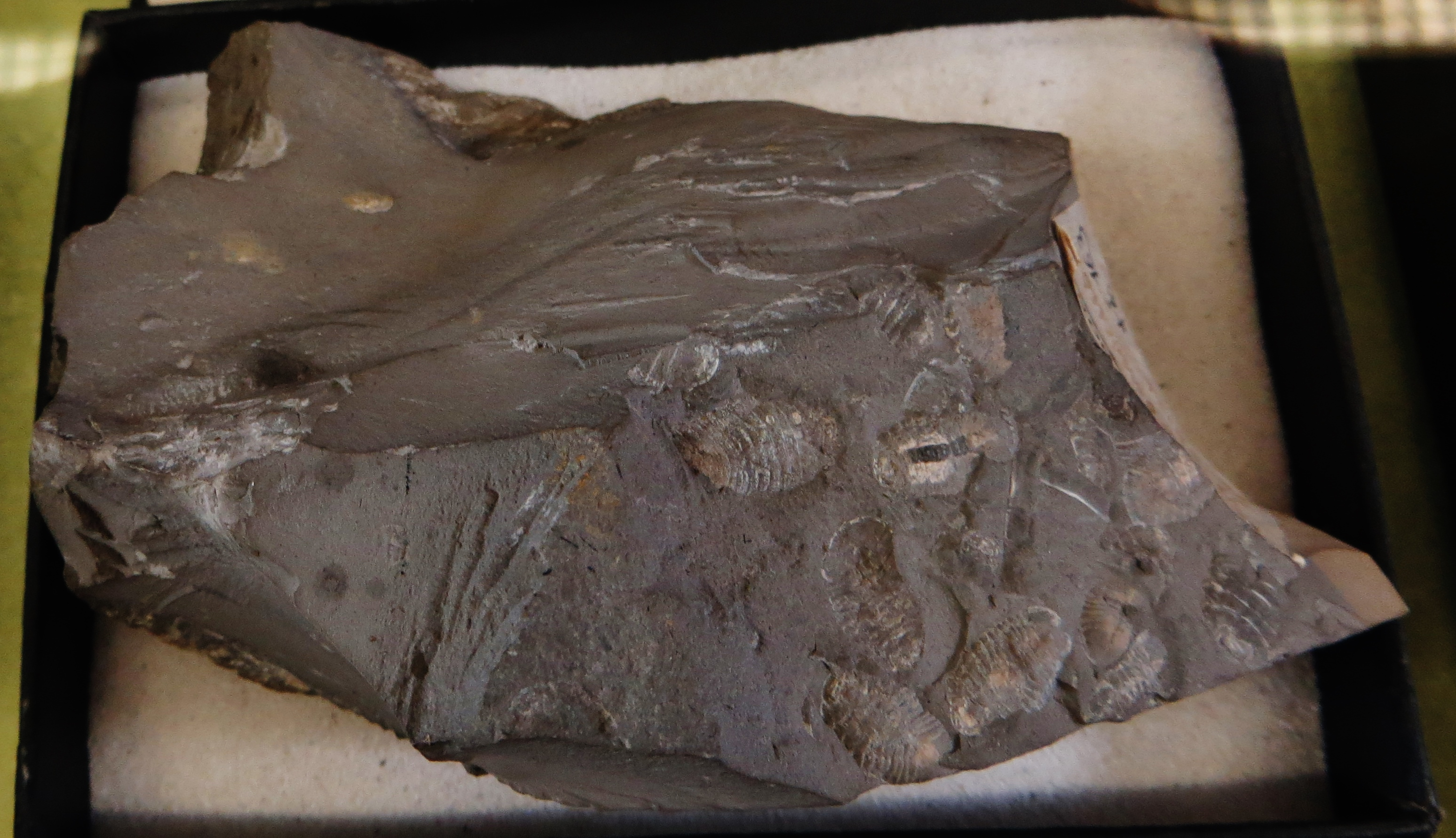
The species Archaeoniscus brodiei from the Mesozoic

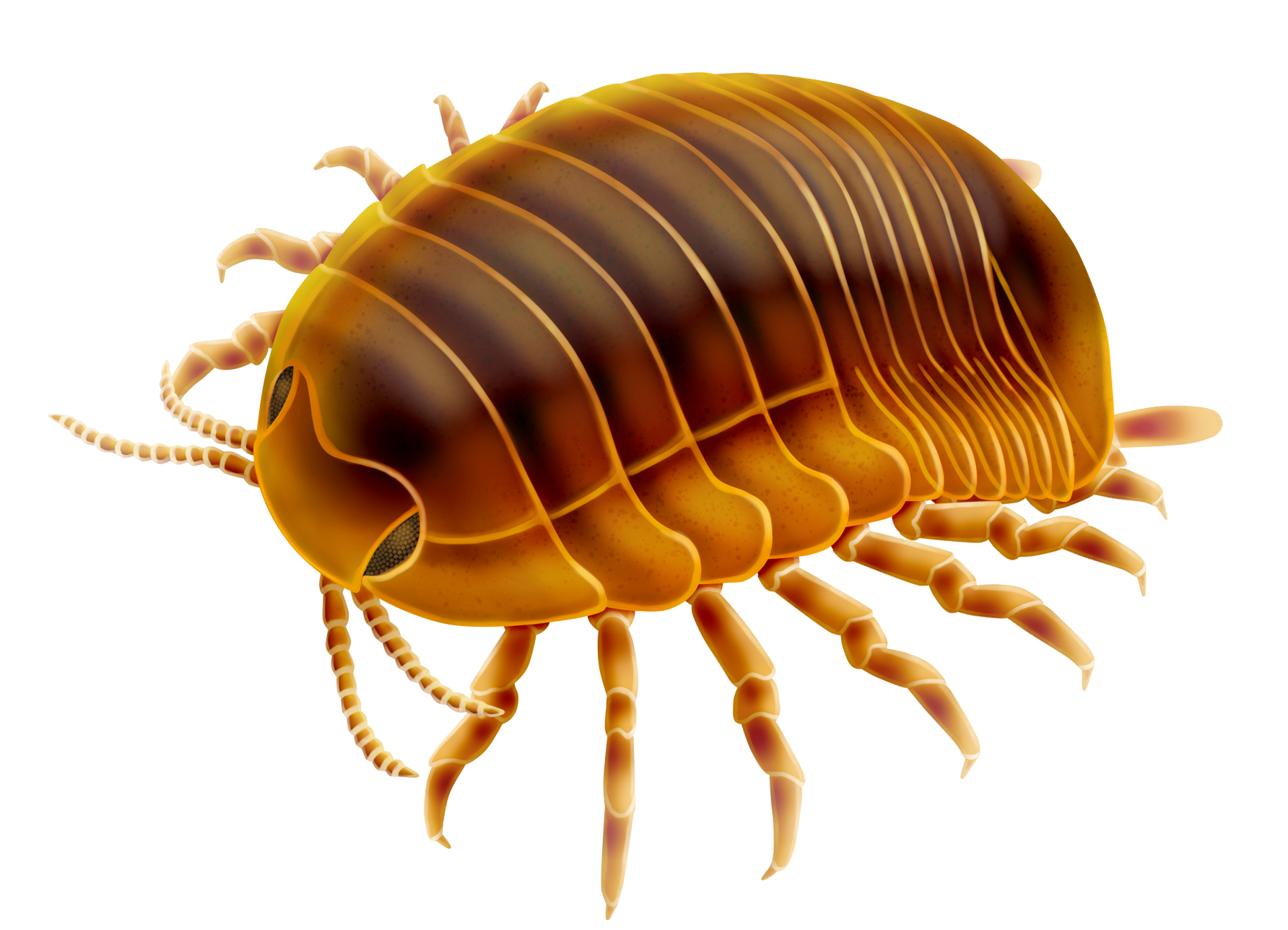
Reconstruction of the species Archaeoniscus coreaensis

The isopod fossil record starts in the late Paleozoic, where about 10 species have been described. The oldest known species are the palaeophreatoicids Hesslerella shermani from the mid-Pennsylvanian and Sottyella montcellensi from the late-Pennsylvanian, both of the sub-order Phreatoicidea. Members of the cymothoidan genera Pseudopalaega and Protourda are known from Artinskian (Early Permian) deposits in Brazil. The palaeophreatoicid Palaeophreatoicus sojanensis is known from mid-Permian deposits from Russia, and the paleophreatoicid Palaeocrangon problematicus and the amphisopid Protamphisopus reichelti are recorded from Lopingian deposits in Germany. Many of the species described from the Paleozoic are considered dubiously placed, with the Proturda records postulated to be tanaidaceans and the Pseudopalaega records are either dubiously placed in Cymothoida or dubiously placed as isopods outright. The genus Sottyella may be a decapod rather than an isopod. Around the Permian-Triassic boundary, the ancestors of the modern janiroid asellote radiations entered the deep sea and apparently survived the massive anoxia events that occurred around the time.

Fossil isopods become more numerous in the Mesozoic. Members of the now-extinct families Archaeoniscidae (Sphaeromatidea) and Urdidae (Cymothoida) were diverse. The first land isopod fossils appear in ambers from Albian and Cenomanian, where they appear to be part of basal clades.

== Biology ==
=== Locomotion ===
Unlike amphipods within the same ecosystem, most species of marine and freshwater isopods are benthic. This lifestyle may hinder their ability to disperse to new regions and may explain their high rates of endemism. Crawling is the primary means of locomotion, while some species bore into the seabed, the ground or timber structures. Some members of the families Sphaeromatidae, Idoteidae and Munnopsidae have the ability to swim, and have their front three pairs of pleopods modified for this purpose, and with their respiratory structures limited to the hind pleopods. Most terrestrial species are slow-moving and conceal themselves under objects or hide in crevices or under bark. The semi-terrestrial sea slaters (Ligia spp.) can run rapidly on land and many terrestrial species can roll themselves into a ball when threatened, a feature that has evolved independently in different groups and also in the marine sphaeromatids. When exposed to kairomones emitted from predatory fish, aquatic isopods will change their behaviour to minimize movement during daylight hours and remain closer to shelter.

=== Terrestrial isopods ===
While the majority of crustaceans are aquatic, isopods are one of the few groups with terrestrial members. Other terrestrial crustaceans include sandhoppers and landhoppers, land crabs, coenobitid hermit crabs, and hexapods (if considered crustaceans). Aside from the semiterrestrial phreatoicidean Phreatoicopsis endemic to the Australian state of Victoria, all terrestrial isopods belong to suborder Oniscidea, also called woodlice, slaters, and many other names.

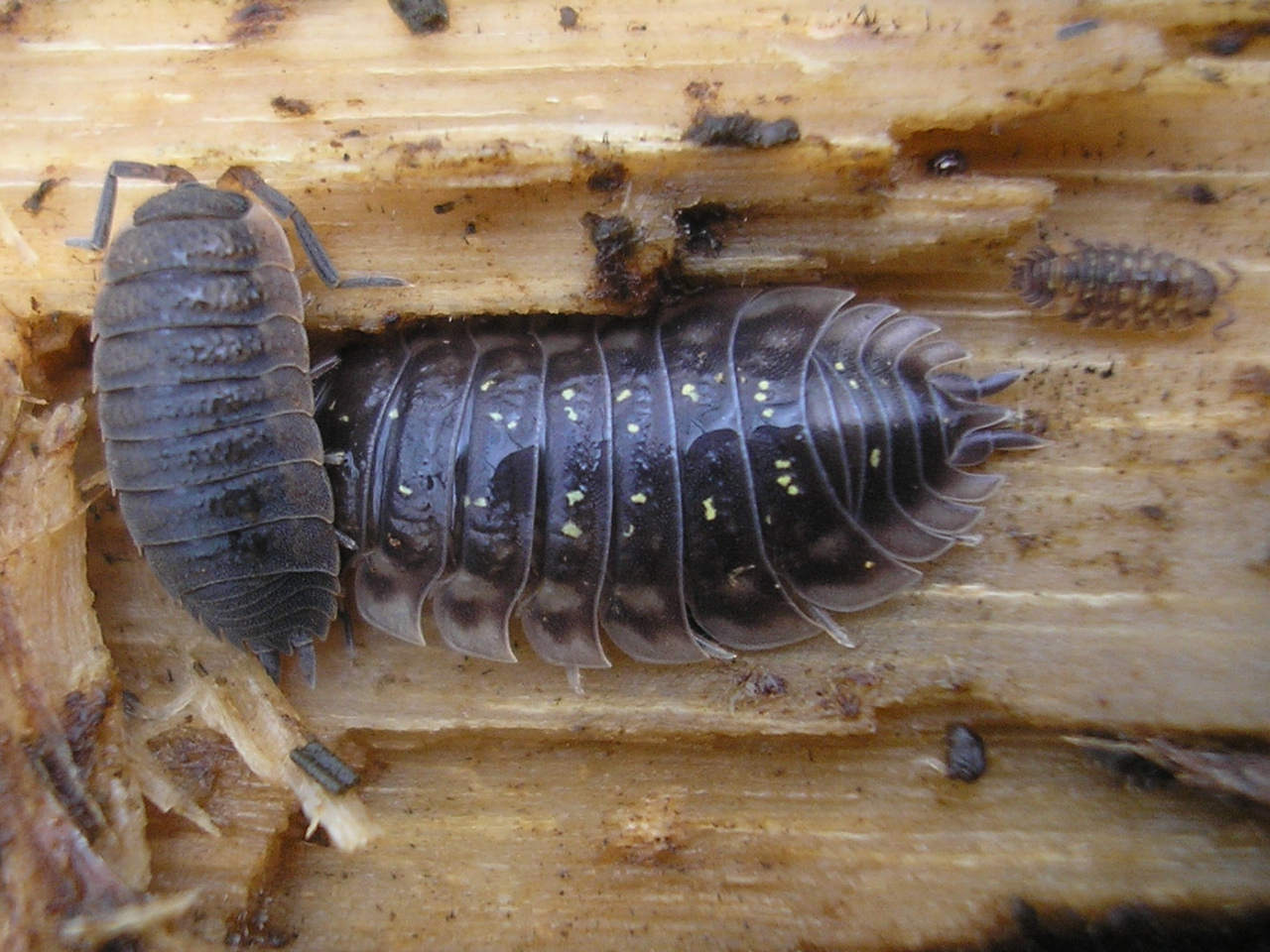
Porcellio scaber (left) and Oniscus asellus (centre)

Members of Oniscidea occur in every region except for Antarctica. They often show affinity for water, and negative phototaxis (affinity to light). They play an important role in many tropical and temperate ecosystems by aiding in the decomposition of plant material through mechanical and chemical means, and by enhancing the activity of microbes. Macro-detritivores, including terrestrial isopods, are absent from arctic and subarctic regions, but have the potential to expand their range with increased temperatures in high latitudes. Desert species like Hemilepistus reaumuri are usually nocturnal, spending the day in a burrow and emerging at night. Moisture is achieved through food sources or by drinking, and some species can form their paired uropodal appendages into a tube and funnel water from dewdrops onto their pleopods. In many taxa, the respiratory structures on the endopods are internal, with a spiracle and pseudotrachaea, which resemble lungs. In others, the endopod is folded inside the adjoining exopod (outer branch of the pleopod). Both these arrangements help to prevent evaporation from the respiratory surfaces.

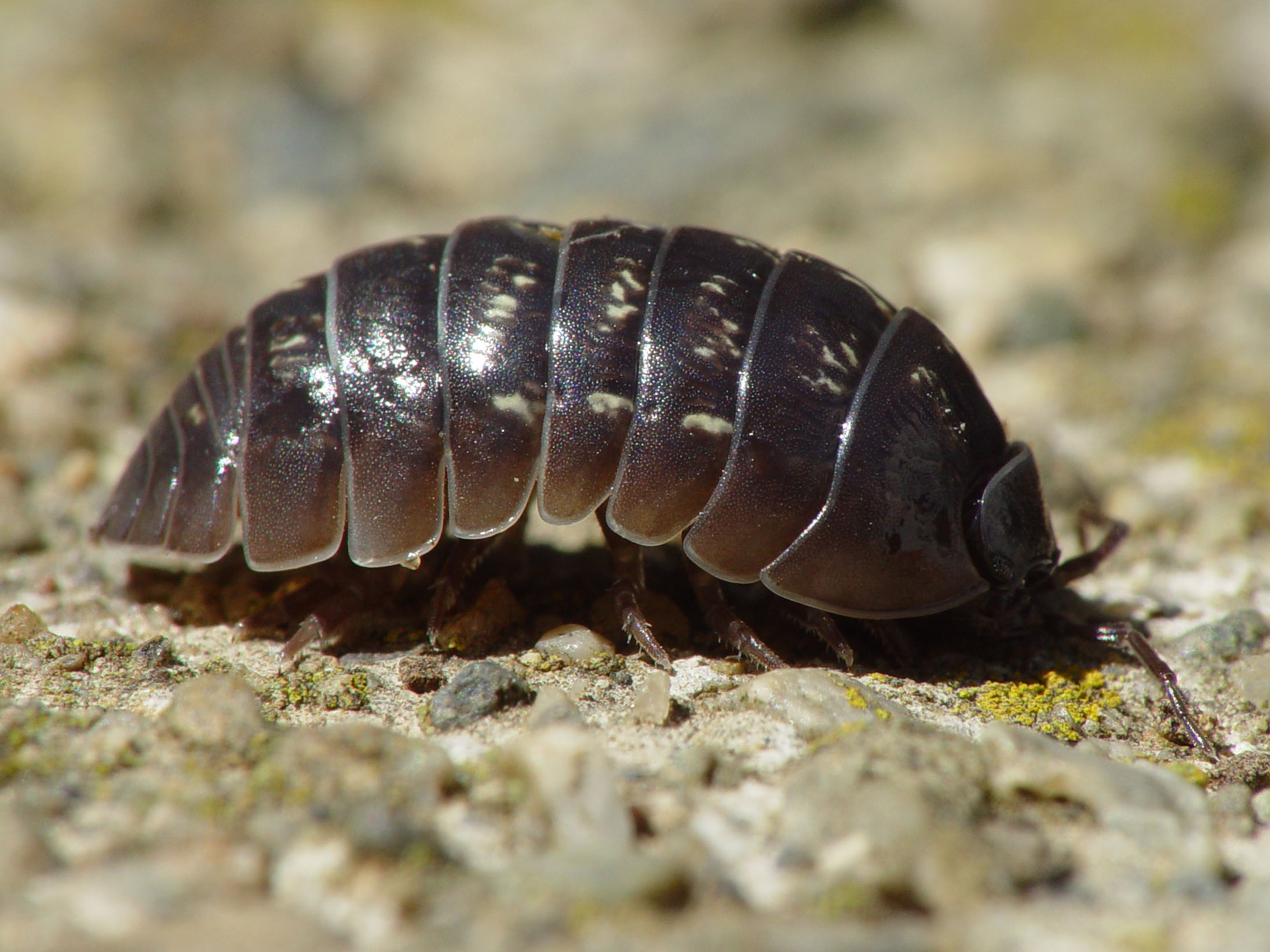
Armadillidium vulgare while moving

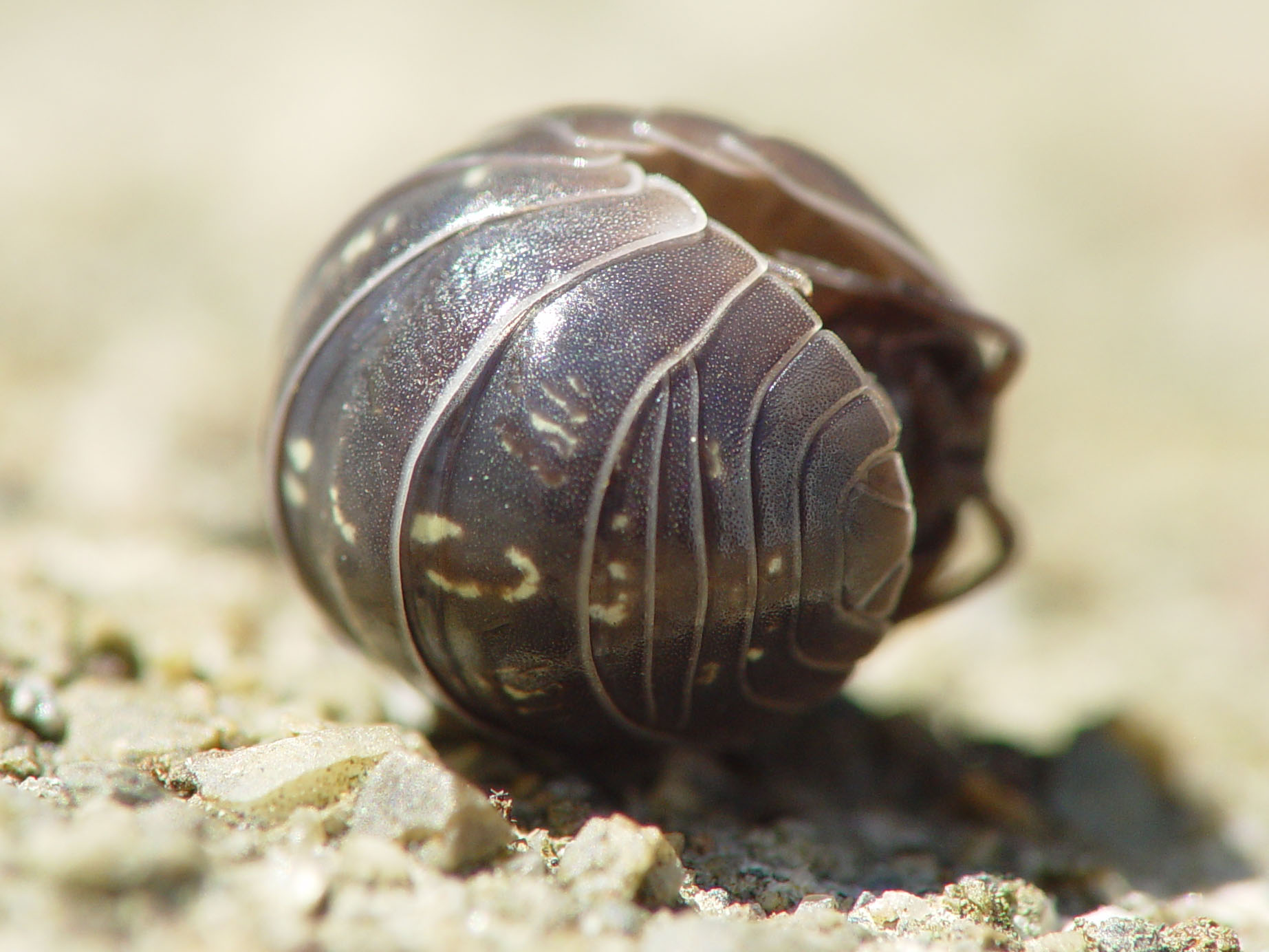
...and rolled into a ball

Woodlice are a major contributor to the humification process by helping to turn dead plant matter into soil.

Some species can roll themselves into a ball – a behaviour known as conglobation – which is used in defense that also conserves moisture. Members of the families Ligiidae and Tylidae, commonly known as rock lice or sea slaters, are the least specialised of the woodlice for life on land. They inhabit the splash zone on rocky shores, jetties and pilings, may hide under debris washed up on the shore and can swim if immersed in water.

=== Feeding ecology ===
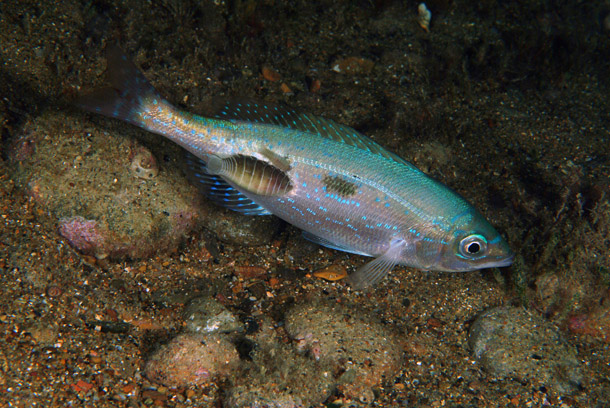
Anilocra (Cymothoidae) parasitising the fish Spicara maena, Italy

Isopods have a simple gut which lacks a midgut section; instead there are caeca connected to the back of the stomach in which absorption takes place. Food is sucked into the esophagus, a process enhanced in the blood-sucking parasitic species, and passed by peristalsis into the stomach, where the material is processed and filtered. The structure of the stomach varies, but in many species there is a dorsal groove into which indigestible material is channelled and a ventral part connected to the caeca where intracellular digestion and absorption take place. Indigestible material passes on through the hindgut and is eliminated through the anus, which is on the pleotelson.

Isopods may be detritivores, browsers, carnivores (including predators and scavengers), parasites, and filter feeders, and may occupy one or more of these feeding niches. Only aquatic and marine species are known to be parasites or filter feeders. Some exhibit coprophagia and will also consume their own fecal pellets. Terrestrial species are in general herbivorous, with woodlice feeding on moss, bark, algae, fungi and decaying material. In marine isopods that feed on wood, cellulose is digested by enzymes secreted in the caeca. The gribble Limnoria lignorum, for example, bores into wood and additionally feeds on the mycelia of fungi attacking the timber, thus increasing the nitrogen in its diet. Land-based wood-borers mostly house symbiotic bacteria in the hindgut which aid in digesting cellulose. There are numerous adaptations to this simple gut, but these are mostly correlated with diet rather than by taxonomic group; these adaptations are not diagnostic traits.

Parasitic species are mostly external parasites of fish or crustaceans and feed on blood. The larvae of Gnathiidae and adult Cymothoidae have piercing and sucking mouthparts and clawed limbs adapted for clinging onto their hosts. In general, isopod parasites have diverse lifestyles and include Cancricepon elegans, found in the gill chambers of crabs; Athelges tenuicaudis, attached to the abdomen of hermit crabs; Crinoniscus equitans living inside the barnacle Balanus perforatus; Cyproniscidae which live inside ostracods and free-living isopods; Bopyridae which inhabit in the gill chambers or on the carapace of shrimps and crabs, which may cause a characteristic bulge recognisable even in some crustacean fossils; and Entoniscidae living inside some species of crab and shrimp. Cymothoa exigua is a parasite of multiple fish species, such as the spotted rose snapper Lutjanus guttatus in the Gulf of California; it causes the tongue of the fish to atrophy and takes its place in what is believed to be the first instance discovered of a parasite functionally replacing a host structure in animals.

=== Reproduction and development ===
In most species, the sexes are separate (dioecy) and there is little sexual dimorphism, but a few species are hermaphroditic and some parasitic forms show large differences between the sexes. Some Cymothoidans are protandrous hermaphrodites, starting life as males and later changing sex, and some Anthuroideans are the inverse, being protogynous hermaphrodites that are born female. Some Gnathiidan males are sessile and live with a group of females. Males have a pair of penises, which may be fused in some species. The sperm is transferred to the female by the modified second pleopod which receives it from the penis and which is then inserted into a female gonopore. The sperm is stored in a special receptacle, a swelling on the oviduct close to the gonopore. Fertilisation only takes place when the eggs are shed soon after a moult, at which time a connection is established between the semen receptacle and the oviduct.

The eggs, which may number up to several hundred, are brooded by the female in the marsupium, a chamber formed by flat plates known as oostegites under the thorax. This is filled with water even in terrestrial species. The eggs hatch as mancae, a post-larval stage which resembles the adult except for the absence of the last pair of pereopods. As adults, isopods differ from other crustaceans in that ecdysis occurs in two stages known as "biphasic moulting"; first they shed the exoskeleton of their posterior (rear part of their body) and sometime later shed the anterior (forward) part. The giant Antarctic isopod Glyptonotus antarcticus is an exception, and moults in a single process. The lack of a swimming phase in the life cycle is a limiting factor in isopod dispersal, and may be responsible for the high levels of endemism in the order.
