= List of isopods of Sri Lanka =

Sri Lanka is an island close to the southern end of India with a tropical environment. The invertebrate fauna is as large as it is common to other regions of the world. There are about two million species of arthropods found in the world, and still it is counting with many new species still being discovered. It is very complicated and difficult to summarize the exact number of species found within a certain region.

The following list provide the isopods of Sri Lanka.

== Isopods ==
Phylum: Arthropoda
Class: Malacostraca
Order: Isopoda

Isopods also known as sowbugs, are crustaceans, that can be found throughout marine, freshwater and terrestrial ecosystems. There are well over 10,000 species of isopods described within 11 suborders. From these, about 4,500 species are marine, 500 species are freshwater and 5,000 are terrestrial forms. They are typically flattened dorsoventrally with two pairs of antennae, seven pairs of jointed limbs on thorax, and five pairs of branching appendages on the abdomen.

The studies on isopods of Sri Lanka clearly studied with the separation of aquatic isopods and terrestrial isopods. Regarding freshwater isopods, the first taxonomic work was done by Fernando and Hanek in 1973. They recorded only two isopods from freshwater bodies in Sri Lanka.

The two terrestrial families of isopods, Trachelipidae and Porcellionidae have been studied by Ferrara and Argano. According to them, three species of Trachelipidae and five of Porcellionidae are recorded from Sri Lanka.

The following checklist on Sri Lankan isopods described 92 species within 53 genera.

=== Family: Aegidae ===
- Aegiochus vigilans
- Alitropus typus
- Rocinela orientalis

=== Family: Agnaridae ===
- Agnara fragilis
- Agnara taprobanica

=== Family: Anthuridae ===
- Amakusanthura moragallae
- Apanthura stocki
- Cyathura bentotae
- Cyathura indica
- Cyathura pusilla
- Haliophasma poorei
- Mesanthura maculata

=== Family: Arcturidae ===
- Amesopous richardsonae

=== Family: Armadillidae ===
- Akermania besucheti
- Cubaris fritschei

=== Family: Cirolanidae ===
- Anopsilana willeyi
- Cirolana bovina
- Cirolana parva
- Cirolana sulcaticauda
- Conilorpheus herdmani

=== Family: Corallanidae ===
- Argathona normani
- Argathona rhinoceros
- Corallana nodosa
- Lanocira gardineri
- Lanocira zeylanica

=== Family: Cymothoidae ===
- Anilocra dimidiata
- Anilocra leptosoma
- Cymothoa eremita
- Cymothoa pulchra
- Elthusa nanoides
- Mothocya melanosticta
- Mothocya plagulophora
- Nerocila serra
- Nerocila sigani

=== Family: Gnathiidae ===
- Elaphognathia insolita
- Gnathia taprobanensis

=== Family: Gnathostenetroididae ===
- Anneckella srilankae - ssp. rectecopulans, srilankae

=== Family: Idoteidae ===
- Synidotea variegata

=== Family: Janiridae ===
- Carpias nana
- Iais pubescens

=== Family: Joeropsididae ===
- Joeropsis ceylonensis
- Joeropsis curvicornis
- Joeropsis indicus

=== Family: Ligiidae ===
- Ligia exotica

=== Family: Microcerberidae ===
- Coxicerberus singhalensis

=== Family: Mysidae ===
- Lycomysis spinicauda
- Mesopodopsis zeylanica
- Siriella paulsoni

=== Family: Oniscidae ===
- Exalloniscus brincki

=== Family: Philosciidae ===
- Burmoniscus anderssoni
- Burmoniscus bartolozzii
- Burmoniscus beroni
- Burmoniscus besucheti
- Burmoniscus calcaratus
- Burmoniscus cederholmi
- Burmoniscus clarus
- Burmoniscus davisi
- Burmoniscus gibbosus
- Burmoniscus loebli
- Burmoniscus longicaudatus
- Burmoniscus micropunctatus
- Burmoniscus parviocellatus
- Burmoniscus rowei
- Burmoniscus setiger
- Burmoniscus stilifer
- Burmoniscus xanthocephalus
- Littorophiloscia tropicalis
- Philoscia mendica
- Philoscia pubescens
- Platycytoniscus granulatus
- Serendibia denticulata
- Sinhaloscia dimorpha

=== Family: Pleurocopidae ===
- Pleurocope dasyure

=== Family: Porcellionidae ===
- Porcellionides pruinosus
- Porcellio scaber
- Porcellio dilatatus

=== Family: Protojaniridae ===
- Enckella lucei - ssp. lucei, major

=== Family: Scleropactidae ===
- Adinda pulchra
- Adinda scabra
- Paratoradjia beroni

=== Family: Sphaeromatidae ===
- Cerceis tuberculata
- Cilicaea beddardi
- Cilicaea latreillei
- Cilicaeopsis whiteleggei
- Cymodoce bicarinata
- Cymodoce inornata
- Dynoides indicus
- Sphaeroma annandalei
- Sphaeroma terebrans
- Sphaeroma walker

=== Family: Stenetriidae ===
- Hansenium chiltoni

=== Family: Trachelipodidae ===
- Nagurus cristatus
- Nagurus nanus
- Nagurus travancorius
