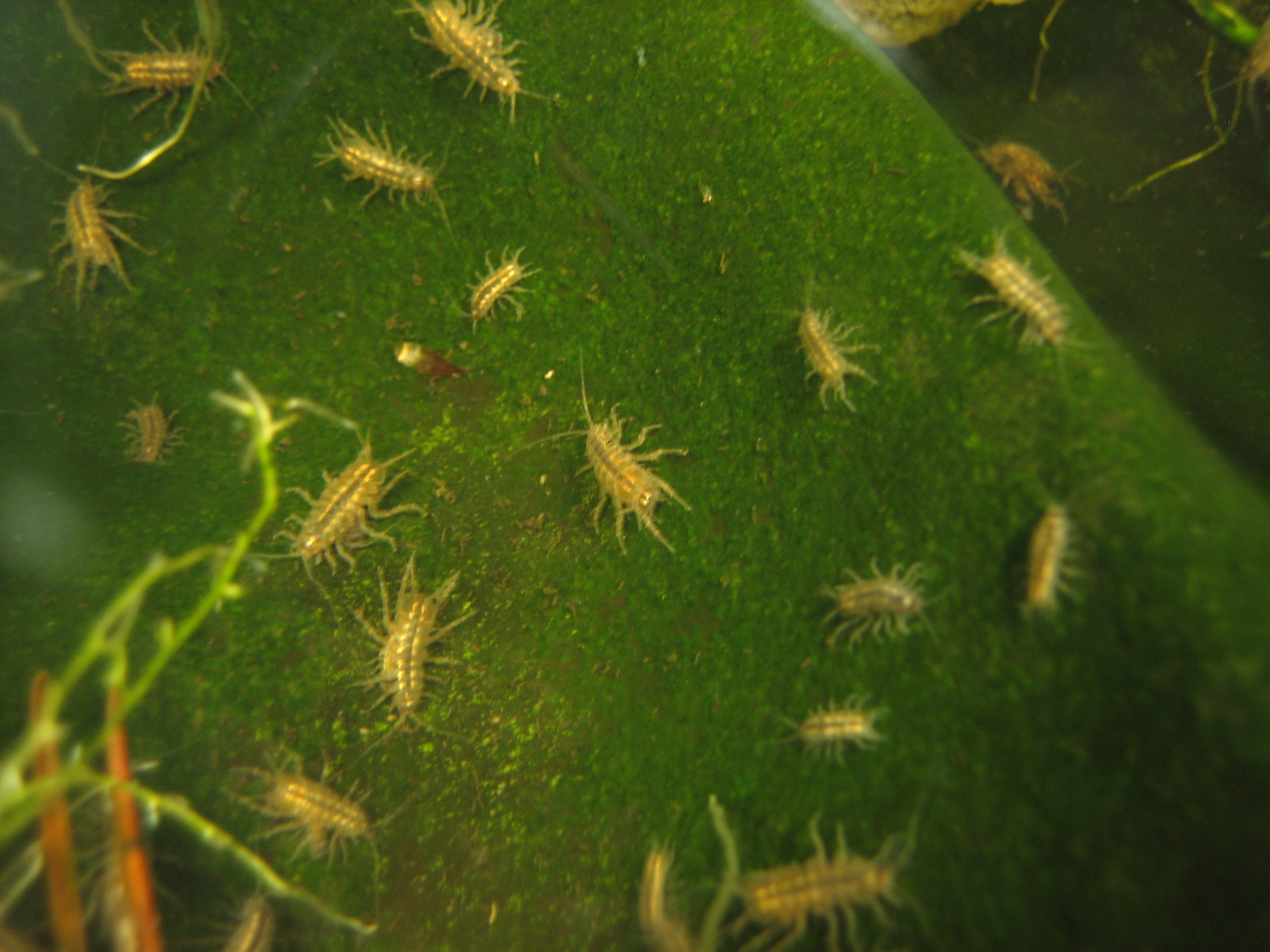
- Asellus aquaticus, Asellidae

Scientific classification
- Kingdom: Animalia
- Phylum: Arthropoda
- Clade: Pancrustacea
- Class: Malacostraca
- Order: Isopoda
- Suborder: Asellota; Latreille, 1802

Superfamilies
- Aselloidea; Stenetrioidea; Janiroidea; Gnathostenetroidoidea

Synonyms
- Microcerberidea

= Asellota =

Asellota Temporal range: Norian–Recent

Suborder of crustaceans

Asellota is a suborder of isopod crustaceans found in marine and freshwater environments. Roughly one-quarter of all marine isopods belong to this suborder. Members of this suborder are readily distinguished from other isopods by their complex copulatory apparatus. Other characteristics include six-jointed antennal peduncle, the styliform uropods (a character shared with some other isopod groups), the fusion of pleonites 5, 4 and sometimes 3 to the pleotelson, and absence of the first pleopod in females. The earliest fossil record is Norian dolomite from Forni Dolostone.

== Classification ==
The suborder Asellota comprises these families: The former suborder Microcerberidea has now been incorporated into Asellota as of 2026, with both consituent families (Microcerberidae and Atlantasellidae) being placed in Aselloidea.

Janiroidea Sars, 1897

- Acanthaspidiidae Menzies, 1962
- Dendrotiidae Vanhöffen, 1914
- Desmosomatidae Sars, 1899
- Echinothambematidae Menzies, 1956
- Haplomunnidae Wilson, 1976
- Haploniscidae Hansen, 1916
- Ischnomesidae Hansen, 1916
- Janirellidae Menzies, 1956
- Janiridae Sars, 1897
- Joeropsididae Nordenstam, 1933
- Katianiridae Svavarsson, 1987
- Macrostylidae Hansen, 1916
- Mesosignidae Schultz, 1969
- Microparasellidae Karaman, 1933
- Mictosomatidae Wolff, 1965
- Munnidae Sars, 1897
- Munnopsidae Lilljeborg, 1864
- Nannoniscidae Hansen, 1916
- Paramunnidae Vanhöffen, 1914
- Pleurocopidae Fresi & Schiecke, 1972
- Santiidae Wilson, 1987
- Thambematidae Stebbing, 1913

Aselloidea Latreille, 1802

- Asellidae Latreille, 1802
- Atlantasellidae Sket, 1979
- Microcerberidae Karaman, 1940
- Stenasellidae Dudich, 1924

Stenetrioidea Hansen, 1905

- Pseudojaniridae Wilson, 1986
- Stenetriidae Hansen, 1905

Gnathostenetroidoidea Kussakin, 1967

- Gnathostenetroididae Kussakin, 1967
- Protojaniridae Fresi, Idato & Scipione, 1980

Incertae sedis

- Vermectiadidae Just & Poore, 1992
