= Iais aquilei =

Scientific classification
- Kingdom: Animalia
- Phylum: Arthropoda
- Class: Malacostraca
- Order: Isopoda
- Suborder: Asellota
- Superfamily: Janiroidea
- Family: Janiridae
- Genus: Iais
- Species: I. aquilei

Binomial name
- Iais aquilei Coineau, 1977

Species of crustacean

Iais aquilei is a species of freshwater isopod, in the suborder Asellota. It is distributed throughout the island of Saint Helena.
