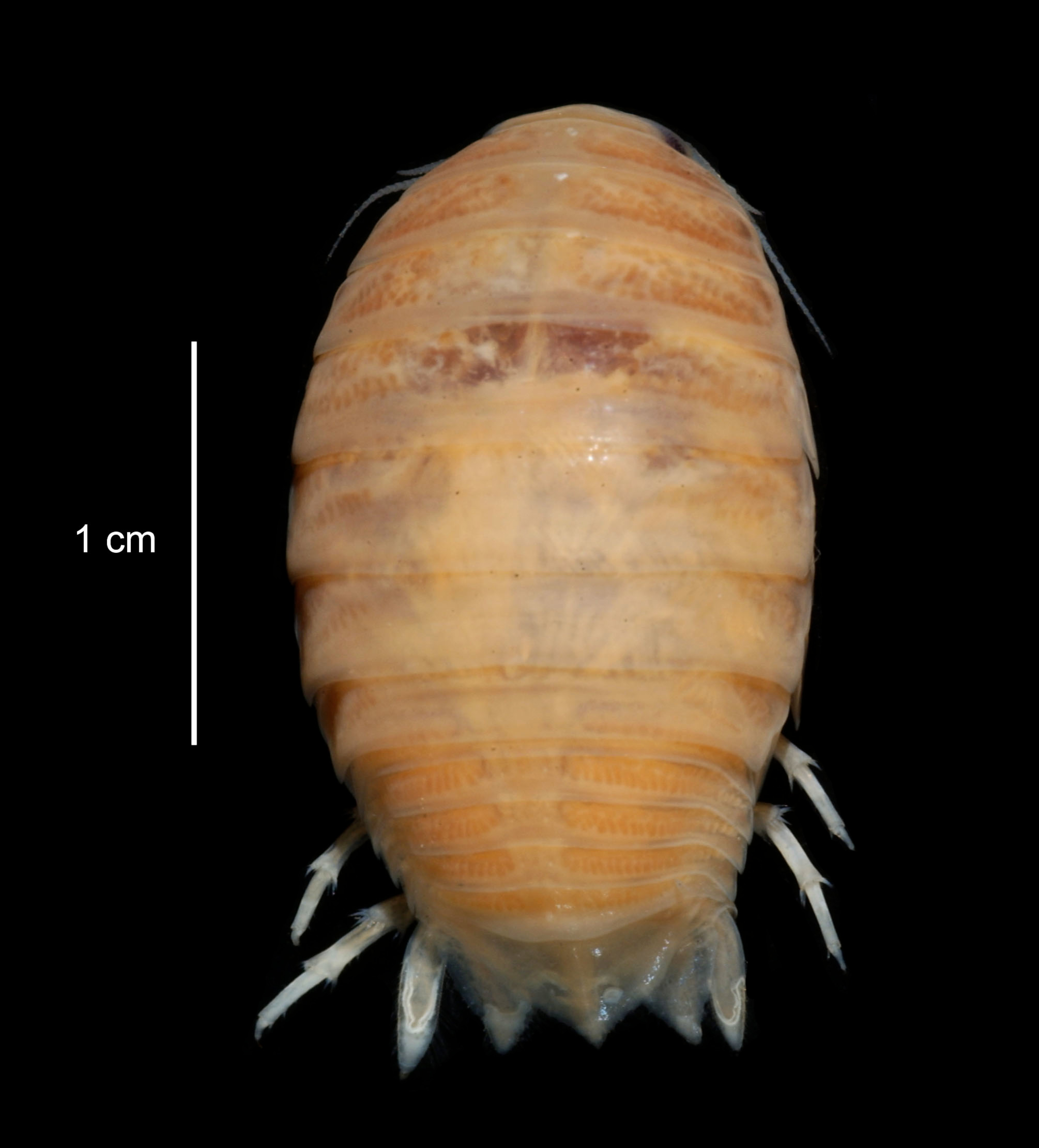

Scientific classification
- Kingdom: Animalia
- Phylum: Arthropoda
- Clade: Pancrustacea
- Class: Malacostraca
- Order: Isopoda
- Family: Aegidae
- Genus: Aegiochus
- Species: A. antarctica

Binomial name
- Aegiochus antarctica Hodgson, 1910

Synonyms
- Aega australis Richardson, 1906; Aega koltuni Kussakin, 1967; Aega antarctica Hodgson 1910

= Aegiochus antarctica =

Species of crustacean

Aegiochus antarctica is a species of isopod crustacean. It is a temporary ectoparasite of fish, feeding on the fish's blood and then dropping to the seabed to digest its meal over a period of several months. It is found in the seas around Antarctica.

The species was originally placed in the genus Aega, but was transferred to Aegiochus.

== Description ==
Aegiochus antarctica can grow to a length of up to 28 mm (1.1 in) but most individuals are less than 20 mm (0.8 in) long. This isopod is an elongate oval when viewed from above and has two large compound eyes and two pairs of antennae. The first pair of antennae are short with thirteen whip-like segments (known as articles) and the second pair longer with fifteen articles. The long slender maxillae and mandible are specialised for puncturing the skin of the host fish. There are seven free thoracic segments, the first three with a pair of short pereiopods (legs) ending in hooked claws. The pleotelson consists of five partially fused abdominal segments each with a pair of short pleopods (legs). The pleotelson is bent slightly downwards and ends in a pointed terminal segment, the telson, which bears a pair of appendages, the uropods. The last three thoracic segments, the pleopods and the uropods are clothed in setae (bristles) on the margins.

== Distribution ==
Aegiochus antarctica has been found in various locations around Antarctica and seems to have a circum-continental distribution. It has been found at depths of between 11 and 500 metres (36 and 1,640 ft).

== Biology ==
This isopod is very inactive, and most of its time is spent stationary, concealed in a crevice or under a stone on the seabed. It needs to feed very infrequently and when it does so it clings onto a host fish with its front three pairs of pleiopods. Younger specimens choose thin skin close to the fins but older ones are indiscriminate in their site of attachment. It then plunges its mouthparts into the fish. It has strong muscles in its oesophagus and large salivary glands and rapidly fills its dilatable hind gut with blood. It then drops off the fish and spends several months on the seabed digesting the blood. In a research study, specimens of Aegiochus antarctica were kept in a marine aquarium at the University of Oldenburg, Germany, where they were maintained at a temperature of −1 °C (30 °F). It was found that they would feed on a number of species of fish native to the North Sea and in this research they were fed on live European plaice (Pleuronectes platessa). One fish was introduced to the isopods at intervals of a month and even so, they often voluntarily went for several months without feeding. Even when deprived of food for ten months, some individuals still had traces of blood in their gut, visible through their translucent outer surface. Growth was very slow and females did not mature until they were at least ten years old.
