= Iais chilense =

Scientific classification
- Kingdom: Animalia
- Phylum: Arthropoda
- Class: Malacostraca
- Order: Isopoda
- Family: Janiridae
- Genus: Iais
- Species: I. chilense

Binomial name
- Iais chilense (Winkler, 1992)

Species of crustacean

Iais chilense is a species of marine isopod in the family Janiridae. It was first described as Neoecitas chilense, before it was moved to the genus Iais. It is among the few members of Iais which do not live commensally with sphaeromatid isopods, and are instead found living near sea level in cracks or crevices.
