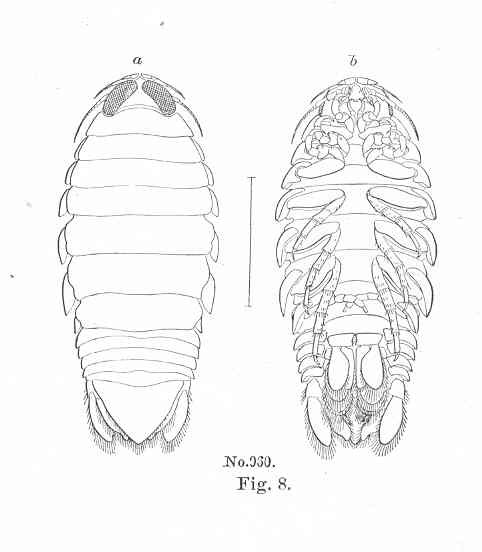
- Dorsal and ventral views of A. psora

Scientific classification
- Kingdom: Animalia
- Phylum: Arthropoda
- Class: Malacostraca
- Order: Isopoda
- Family: Aegidae
- Genus: Aega
- Species: A. psora

Binomial name
- Aega psora (Linnaeus, 1758)

Synonyms
- Oniscus psora Linnaeus, 1758; Aega emarginata Leach, 1818

= Aega psora =

Species of crustacean

Aega psora is a species of isopod crustacean that parasitises a number of fish species in the North Atlantic. It is a serious ectoparasite of larger species of fish, particularly when they are injured.

== Description ==
Aega psora is the type species of the genus Aega and was first described by Carl Linnaeus in 1758. It reaches 15 mm (0.6 in) in length and is mostly grey, with a faint dorsal stripe. It has slender mandibles and maxillae adapted for sucking blood and some of the setae (bristles) are hooked. The front three pairs of pereiopods (legs) cling on to its host, it inserts its mouthparts and blood is pumped rapidly into the gut. Other adaptations for this method of feeding include strong muscles in its oesophagus and large salivary glands.

== Distribution ==
Aega psora is widespread throughout the North Atlantic Ocean and has been found in the Baltic Sea, the North Sea and the Irish Sea. In the northwestern Atlantic it is found between the Bay of Fundy and Cape Cod.

== Hosts ==
Aega psora is a facultative parasite which temporarily attaches itself to its host and is able to survive independently. It probably spends the rest of the time resting on the seabed.

It has been found as an external parasite on the Atlantic cod (Gadus morhua), the Greenland shark (Somniosus microcephalus), a shark in the genus Squalus, the common skate (Raja batis), the thorny skate (Amblyraja radiata) and the barndoor skate (Dipturus laevis). Large numbers have also been found in the stomach of a Greenland shark, though whether living as a parasite or as a commensal is unclear. It was also found for the first time on the goldstripe sardinella (Sardinella gibbosa) off the coast of Egypt in 2007.
