= Pentaceration bifida =

Scientific classification
- Kingdom: Animalia
- Phylum: Arthropoda
- Class: Malacostraca
- Order: Isopoda
- Family: Paramunnidae
- Genus: Pentaceration
- Species: P. bifida

Binomial name
- Pentaceration bifida Just, 2011

Species of marine isopod

Pentaceration bifida is a species of marine isopod in the family Paramunnidae. It is found at a depth of around 151 m, in Northern West Australia, and the Arafura Sea. P. bifida grows up to 1.1 mm in length.
