= Janira quadricostata =

Scientific classification
- Kingdom: Animalia
- Phylum: Arthropoda
- Class: Malacostraca
- Order: Isopoda
- Family: Janiridae
- Genus: Janira
- Species: J. quadricostata

Binomial name
- Janira quadricostata d'Orbigny, 1843

Extinct species of crustacean

Janira quadricostata is an extinct species of arthropod. It has been described by Alcide d'Orbigny in 1843.

== Bibliography ==
- d'Orbigny, Alcide (1843). Paléontologie française. Description zoologique et géologique de tous les animaux mollusques & rayonnés fossiles de France. Vol. 3. Paris: Arthus Bertrand. p. 807.
