= Rocinela kapala =

Scientific classification
- Kingdom: Animalia
- Phylum: Arthropoda
- Class: Malacostraca
- Order: Isopoda
- Family: Aegidae
- Genus: Rocinela
- Species: R. kapala

Binomial name
- Rocinela kapala Bruce, 1988

Species of crustacean

(AM P31740) Holotype site: Clarence River mouth'"`UNIQ--ref-00000006-QINU`"'

Rocinela kapala is a species of isopod in the family Aegidae, and was first described in 1988 by Niel L. Bruce. The species was first described in detail as R. oculata. The species is named for the FRV Kapala, the vessel from which the holotype (AM P31740) was collected at a depth of 450 metres.

It is found in coastal seas of eastern Australia from southern Queensland to Bass Strait.
