= Desmosoma australis =

Scientific classification
- Kingdom: Animalia
- Phylum: Arthropoda
- Class: Malacostraca
- Order: Isopoda
- Family: Desmosomatidae
- Genus: Desmosoma
- Species: D. australis

Binomial name
- Desmosoma australis Nordenstam, 1933

Species of crustacean

Desmosoma australis is a species of marine isopod found in the south Atlantic Ocean. It is found in depths between 64 and 148 meters below the surface.
