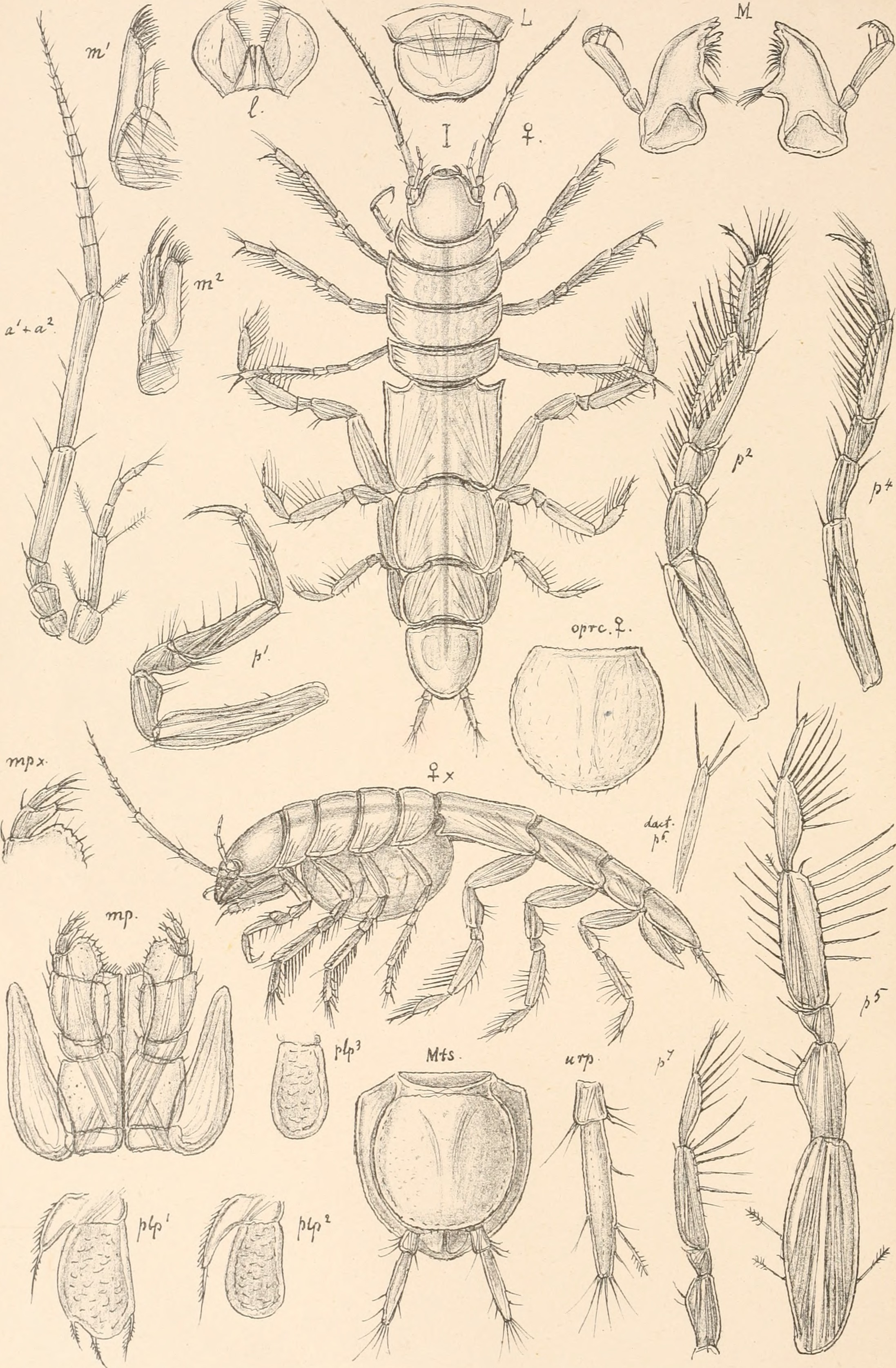
- illustration of Desmosoma lineare in An account of the Crustacea of Norway, with short descriptions and figures of all the species, by Georg Ossian Sars (1837-1927)

Scientific classification
- Kingdom: Animalia
- Phylum: Arthropoda
- Class: Malacostraca
- Order: Isopoda
- Family: Desmosomatidae
- Subfamily: Desmosomatinae
- Genus: Desmosoma; Sars, 1864

Type species
- Desmosoma lineare Sars, 1864, by subsequent designation: Sars, 1897

= Desmosoma =

Genus of crustaceans

Desmosoma is a genus of isopods belonging to the suborder Asellota.

== Species ==
The Genus contains these 23 species:

- Desmosoma affine
- Desmosoma antarcticum
- Desmosoma australis
- Desmosoma brevipes
- Desmosoma dolosa
- Desmosoma elegans
- Desmosoma elongatum
- Desmosoma gigantea
- Desmosoma hesslera
- Desmosoma imbricata
- Desmosoma latipes
- Desmosoma lineare
- Desmosoma lobipes
- Desmosoma modestum
- Desmosoma ochotense
- Desmosoma pannosa
- Desmosoma puritanum
- Desmosoma renatae
- Desmosoma strombergi
- Desmosoma tetarta
- Desmosoma thoracicum
- Desmosoma tyrrhenicum
- Desmosoma zenkewitschi
