= Pentaceration forkandbrewer =

Scientific classification
- Kingdom: Animalia
- Phylum: Arthropoda
- Class: Malacostraca
- Order: Isopoda
- Family: Paramunnidae
- Genus: Pentaceration
- Species: P. forkandbrewer

Binomial name
- Pentaceration forkandbrewer Peart & Schnabel, 2024

Species of isopod

Pentaceration forkandbrewer is a species of marine isopod in the family Paramunnidae, it is found off the coast of New Zealand, in depths of up to 5,500 m. It was named after a local brewery in Wellington, after winning a contest at a Crustacean conference.
