= Iais californica =

Scientific classification
- Kingdom: Animalia
- Phylum: Arthropoda
- Class: Malacostraca
- Order: Isopoda
- Family: Janiridae
- Genus: Iais
- Species: I. californica

Binomial name
- Iais californica (Richardson, 1904)

Synonyms
- Janiropsis californica Richardson, 1904

Species of crustacean

Iais californica is an isopod species in the Janiridae family. The species has a commensal relationship with another isopod, Sphaeroma quoyanum.
