= Iais singaporensis =

Scientific classification
- Kingdom: Animalia
- Phylum: Arthropoda
- Class: Malacostraca
- Order: Isopoda
- Family: Janiridae
- Genus: Iais
- Species: I. singaporensis

Binomial name
- Iais singaporensis Menzies & Barnard, 1951

Species of marine isopod

Iais singaporensis is a species of marine isopod found in Singapore. It is found living commensally on sphaeromatid isopods.

== Description ==
The male holotype of Iais singaporensis is about 1.7 millimetres (0.067 in) in length and about 0.7 millimetres (0.028 in) in width. Its first antenna is about one fifth of the length of the body, with the second antenna being longer at slightly less than two thirds of the body. The pleotelson is noticeably rounded and wider than it is long.
