= Rocinela signata =

- Rocinela signata parasitizing Chelonia mydas. Scale bars = 2 mm (all panels)

Scientific classification
- Kingdom: Animalia
- Phylum: Arthropoda
- Clade: Pancrustacea
- Class: Malacostraca
- Order: Isopoda
- Family: Aegidae
- Genus: Rocinela
- Species: R. signata

Binomial name
- Rocinela signata Schioedte & Meinert, 1879

Synonyms
- Rocinela aries Schioedte & Meinert, 1879

Species of crustacean

Rocinela signata is a species of isopod in the family Aegidae. It was first described in 1879 by Schioedte, J. C. and Meinert, F. W.

The species is an ecto-parasite which feeds off the blood of marine animals such as fish before dropping to digest the blood on the sea floor.

Rocinela signata has been found near the coast across South America, and in the Mediterranean near the coast of Syria. It has so far been recorded in waters as deep as 90 m (300 ft). It is associated with multiple marine species such as Pseudupeneus maculatus, Atlantic horse mackerel, Bluespotted cornetfish, Hogfish, Sparisoma sp., Lane snappers, et cetera, and less commonly on fibropapillomatosis of Green sea turtles, and reportedly have bitten human swimmers.
