= Desmosoma elegans =

Scientific classification
- Kingdom: Animalia
- Phylum: Arthropoda
- Class: Malacostraca
- Order: Isopoda
- Family: Desmosomatidae
- Genus: Desmosoma
- Species: D. elegans

Binomial name
- Desmosoma elegans Fresi & Schiecke, 1969

Species of crustacean

Desmosoma elegans is a species of isopod from the island of Ischia in the Bay of Naples.
