= Iais floridana =

Scientific classification
- Kingdom: Animalia
- Phylum: Arthropoda
- Clade: Pancrustacea
- Class: Malacostraca
- Order: Isopoda
- Family: Janiridae
- Genus: Iais
- Species: I. floridana

Binomial name
- Iais floridana Kensley & Schotte, 1999

Species of crustacean

Iais floridana is a species of isopod in the family Janiridae. It has a commensal relationship with another isopod, the wood-boring Sphaeroma terebrans. Its native range is unknown, but its host is native to the Indo-Pacific region. It is currently known from the Gulf and Eastern coasts of Florida, where it was first found, and described, in the 1990s.
