= Iais antarctica =

Scientific classification
- Kingdom: Animalia
- Phylum: Arthropoda
- Class: Malacostraca
- Order: Isopoda
- Family: Janiridae
- Genus: Iais
- Species: I. antarctica

Binomial name
- Iais antarctica Chappuis, 1958

Species of crustacean

Iais antarctica is a species of freshwater isopod in the family Janiridae. It was first described as Protocharon antarctica, before it was moved to the genus Iais.
