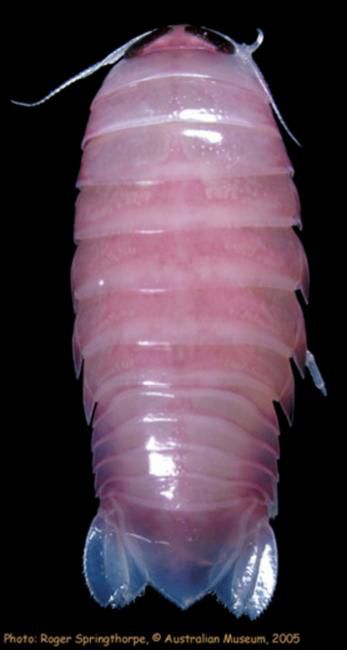

Scientific classification
- Kingdom: Animalia
- Phylum: Arthropoda
- Class: Malacostraca
- Order: Isopoda
- Family: Aegidae
- Genus: Aegiochus
- Species: A. piihuka

Binomial name
- Aegiochus piihuka Bruce, 2009

= Aegiochus piihuka =

Species of crustacean

Holotype site: Hawkes Bay, New Zealand'"`UNIQ--ref-00000006-QINU`"'

Aegiochus piihuka is a species of isopod in the family Aegidae, and was first described in 2009 by Niel L. Bruce. The species epithet, piihuka, is a Māori word meaning hook, and refers to the hooked anterior legs.

The species is associated with hexactinellid sponges.

It is found in waters of the coasts of New Zealand and Australia, off Queensland and New South Wales.
