= Iais elongata =

Scientific classification
- Kingdom: Animalia
- Phylum: Arthropoda
- Class: Malacostraca
- Order: Isopoda
- Family: Janiridae
- Genus: Iais
- Species: I. elongata

Binomial name
- Iais elongata Sivertsen & Holthuis, 1980

Species of crustacean

Iais elongata is a species of brackish isopod, found on Inaccessible Island.

== Description ==
It has a long and narrow body, being around 4 times wider than it is long. It gradually widens from the first to the last pereonite and it is covered in short, widely spaced hair.
