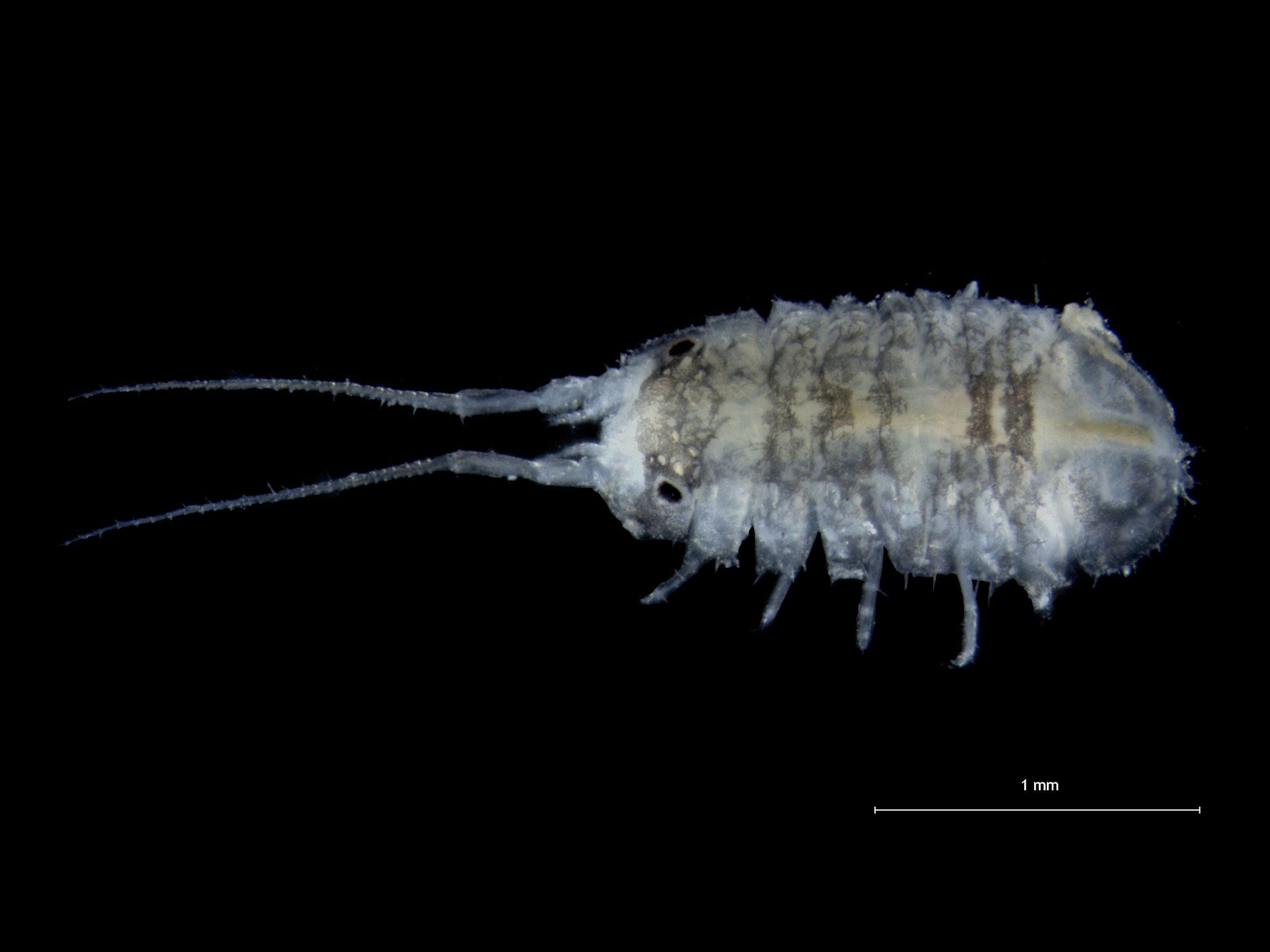

Scientific classification
- Kingdom: Animalia
- Phylum: Arthropoda
- Class: Malacostraca
- Order: Isopoda
- Family: Janiridae
- Genus: Jaera
- Species: J. albifrons

Binomial name
- Jaera albifrons Leach, 1814

= Jaera albifrons =

Species of crustacean

Jaera albifrons is a species of isopod in the family Janiridae. It is found in Europe and North America.
