= Nannoniscidae =

Scientific classification
- Kingdom: Animalia
- Phylum: Arthropoda
- Class: Malacostraca
- Order: Isopoda
- Suborder: Asellota
- Superfamily: Janiroidea
- Family: Nannoniscidae; Hansen, 1916

Family of crustaceans

Nannoniscidae is a family of crustaceans belonging to the order Isopoda. The family is closely related to Desmosomatidae, with multiple genera unidentifiable to family level due to containing attributes of both families.

== Genera ==
The family contains the following genera:

- Austroniscus Vanhöffen, 1914
- Exiliniscus Siebenaller & Hessler, 1981
- Hebefustis Siebenaller & Hessler, 1977
- Ketosoma Kaiser & Brix in Kaiser, Brix, Kihara, Janssen & Jennings, 2018
- Micromesus Birstein, 1963
- Nannoniscoides Hansen, 1916
- Nannonisconus Schultz, 1966
- Nannoniscus G.O. Sars, 1870
- Nymphodora Kaiser, 2009
- Panetela Siebenaller & Hessler, 1981
- Rapaniscus Siebenaller & Hessler, 1981
- Regabellator Siebenaller & Hessler, 1981
- Thaumastosoma Hessler, 1970
