= IAIS =

Iais is a genus of crustaceans.

IAIS may refer to:

- International Association of Insurance Supervisors
- Iowa Interstate Railroad
