= Aegiochus bertrandi =

Scientific classification
- Kingdom: Animalia
- Phylum: Arthropoda
- Class: Malacostraca
- Order: Isopoda
- Family: Aegidae
- Genus: Aegiochus
- Species: A. bertrandi

Binomial name
- Aegiochus bertrandi Bruce, 2009

Species of crustacean

Holotype site: Norfolk Ridge, New Caledonia'"`UNIQ--ref-00000006-QINU`"'

Aegiochus bertrandi is a species of isopod in the family Aegidae, and was first described in 2009 by Niel L. Bruce. The species epithet, bertrandi, honours the French zoologist Bertrand Richer de Forges.
