= Munnopsidae =

Scientific classification
- Kingdom: Animalia
- Phylum: Arthropoda
- Class: Malacostraca
- Order: Isopoda
- Superfamily: Janiroidea
- Family: Munnopsidae; Lilljeborg, 1864

Subfamilies
- Acanthocopinae Wolff, 1962; Bathyopsurinae Wolff, 1962; Betamorphinae Kussakin, 2003; Eurycopinae Hansen, 1916; Ilyarachninae Hansen, 1916; Lipomerinae Tattersall, 1905; Munnopsinae Lilljeborg, 1864; Storthyngurinae Kussakin, 2003; Syneurycopinae Wolff, 1962

Synonyms
- Acanthomunnopsidae; Eurycopidae; Ilyarachnidae; Munnopsididae

Family of crustaceans

The family Munnopsidae is a family of asellote isopoda which is one of the most speciose and frequently collected of the known isopod families. As currently structured it consists of nine subfamilies, 44 genera and about 364 species. The Munnopsidae is frequently the most abundant and diverse isopod family in benthic deep−sea communities and also has a wide distribution in cold waters.

Bathyopsurus nybelini, a member of this family, has been known to consume Sargassum that has fallen to the seabed.

== Genera within the family Munnopsidae ==
The following genera are listed for the Munnopsidae:

=== Acanthocopinae ===
- Acanthocope Beddard, 1885

=== Bathyopsurinae ===
- Bathyopsurus Nordenstam, 1955
- Paropsurus Wolff, 1962

=== Betamorphinae ===
- Amuletta Wilson & Thistle, 1985
- Betamorpha Hessler & Thistle, 1975

=== Eurycopinae ===
- Baeonectes Wilson, 1982
- Belonectes Wilson & Hessler, 1981
- Disconectes Wilson & Hessler, 1981
- Dubinectes Malyutina & Brandt, 2006
- Eurycope G.O. Sars, 1864
- Gurjanopsis Malyutina & Brandt, 2007
- Microcope Malyutina, 2008
- Tytthocope Wilson & Hessler, 1981

=== Ilyarachnae ===
- Aspidarachna G.O. Sars, 1897
- Bathybadistes Hessler & Thistle, 1975
- Echinozone G.O. Sars, 1897
- Epikopais Merrin, 2009
- Ilyarachna G.O. Sars, 1869
- Notopais Hodgson, 1910
- Nyctobadistes Merrin, 2011
- Pseudarachna G.O. Sars, 1897

=== Lipomerinae ===
- Coperonus Wilson, 1989
- Hapsidohedra Wilson, 1989
- Lionectes Wilson, 1989
- Lipomera Tattersall, 1905
- Mimocopelates Wilson, 1989
- Munneurycope Stephensen, 1912
- Munnicope Menzies & George, 1972

=== Munnopsinae ===
- Acanthamunnopsis Schultz, 1978
- Munnopsis M. Sars, 1861
- Munnopsoides Tattersall, 1905
- Paramunnopsis Hansen, 1916
- Pseudomunnopsis Hansen, 1916
- Munnopsurus Richardson, 1912

=== Storthyngurinae ===
- Microprotus Richardson, 1909
- Rectisura Malyutina, 2003
- Storthyngura Vanhöffen, 1914
- Storthyngurella Malyutina, 1999
- Sursumura Malyutina, 2003
- Vanhoeffenura Malyutina, 2004

=== Syneurycopinae ===
- Bellibos Haugsness & Hessler, 1979
- Syneurycope Hansen, 1916
