= Haplomunnidae =

Scientific classification
- Kingdom: Animalia
- Phylum: Arthropoda
- Clade: Pancrustacea
- Class: Malacostraca
- Order: Isopoda
- Superfamily: Janiroidea
- Family: Haplomunnidae

Family of crustaceans

Haplomunnidae is a family of rare abyssal deep sea isopods, often found in the northwest pacific, belonging to the suborder Asellota.

== Genera ==
The family contains the following Genera:

- Abyssaranea Wilson & Hessler, 1974
- Haplodendron Just, 2003
- Haplomunna Richardson, 1908
- Munella Bonnier, 1896
- Thylakogaster Wilson & Hessler, 1974
