= Haploniscidae =

Scientific classification
- Kingdom: Animalia
- Phylum: Arthropoda
- Clade: Pancrustacea
- Class: Malacostraca
- Order: Isopoda
- Superfamily: Janiroidea
- Family: Haploniscidae; Hansen, 1916

Family of crustaceans

Haploniscidae is a family of deep sea isopods belonging to the suborder Asellota.

== Genera ==
The family contains the following Genera:

- Abyssoniscus Birstein, 1971
- Antennuloniscus Menzies, 1962
- Aspidoniscus Menzies & Schultz, 1968
- Chandraniscus George, 2004
- Chauliodoniscus Lincoln, 1985
- Haploniscus Richardson, 1908
- Hydroniscus Hansen, 1916
- Mastigoniscus Lincoln, 1985
