= Vermectias =

Scientific classification
- Kingdom: Animalia
- Phylum: Arthropoda
- Class: Malacostraca
- Order: Isopoda
- Suborder: Asellota
- Family: Vermectiadidae
- Genus: Vermectias; Sivertsen & Holthuis, 1980

Genus of crustaceans

Vermectias is a genus of crustaceans belonging to the monotypic family Vermectiadidae.

Species:

- Vermectias caudiculata Sivertsen & Holthuis, 1980
- Vermectias nelladanae Just & Poore, 1992
