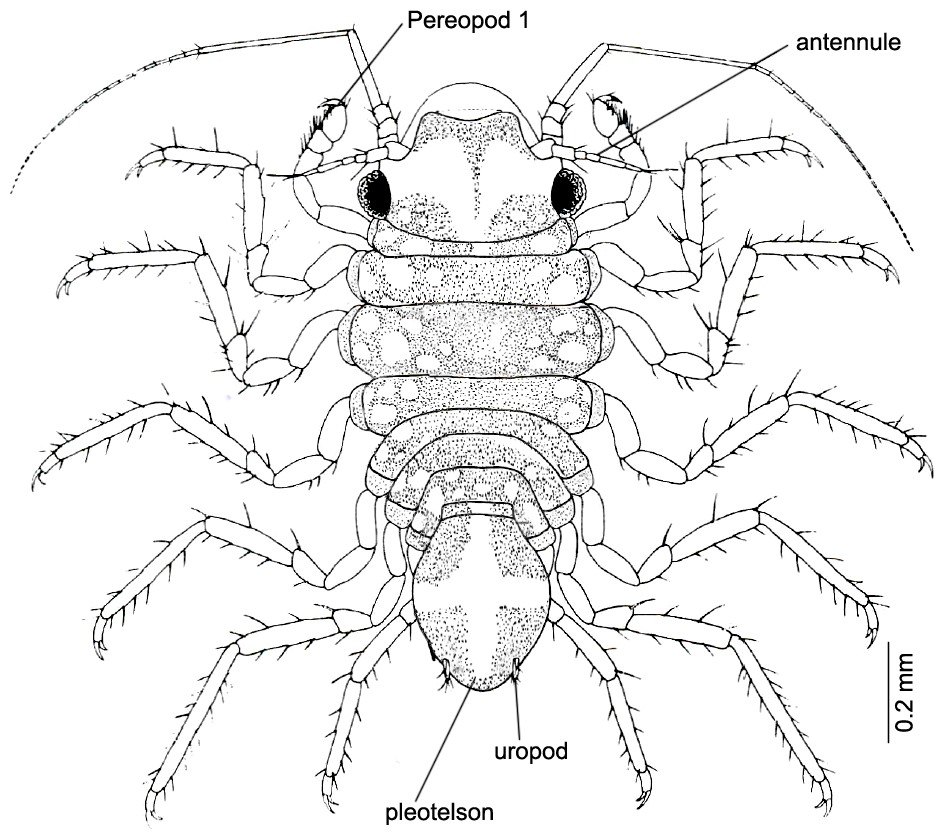
- Uromunna sheltoni

Scientific classification
- Kingdom: Animalia
- Phylum: Arthropoda
- Clade: Pancrustacea
- Class: Malacostraca
- Order: Isopoda
- Suborder: Asellota
- Superfamily: Janiroidea
- Family: Munnidae; Sars, 1897

= Munnidae =

Family of crustaceans

The Munnidae are a family of isopod crustaceans, containing these genera:

- Astrurus Beddard, 1886
- Echinomunna Vanhöffen, 1914
- Munna Krøyer, 1839
- Salvatiella Mueller, 1990
- Uromunna Menzies, 1962
- Zoromunna Menzies & George, 1972
