= Janirellidae =

Scientific classification
- Kingdom: Animalia
- Phylum: Arthropoda
- Class: Malacostraca
- Order: Isopoda
- Superfamily: Janiroidea
- Family: Janirellidae; Menzies, 1956

Family of crustaceans

Janirellidae is a family of isopods belonging to the suborder Asellota.

== Genera ==
The family contains the following Genera:

- Dactylostylis Richardson, 1911
- Janirella Bonnier, 1896
- Triaina Just, 2009
