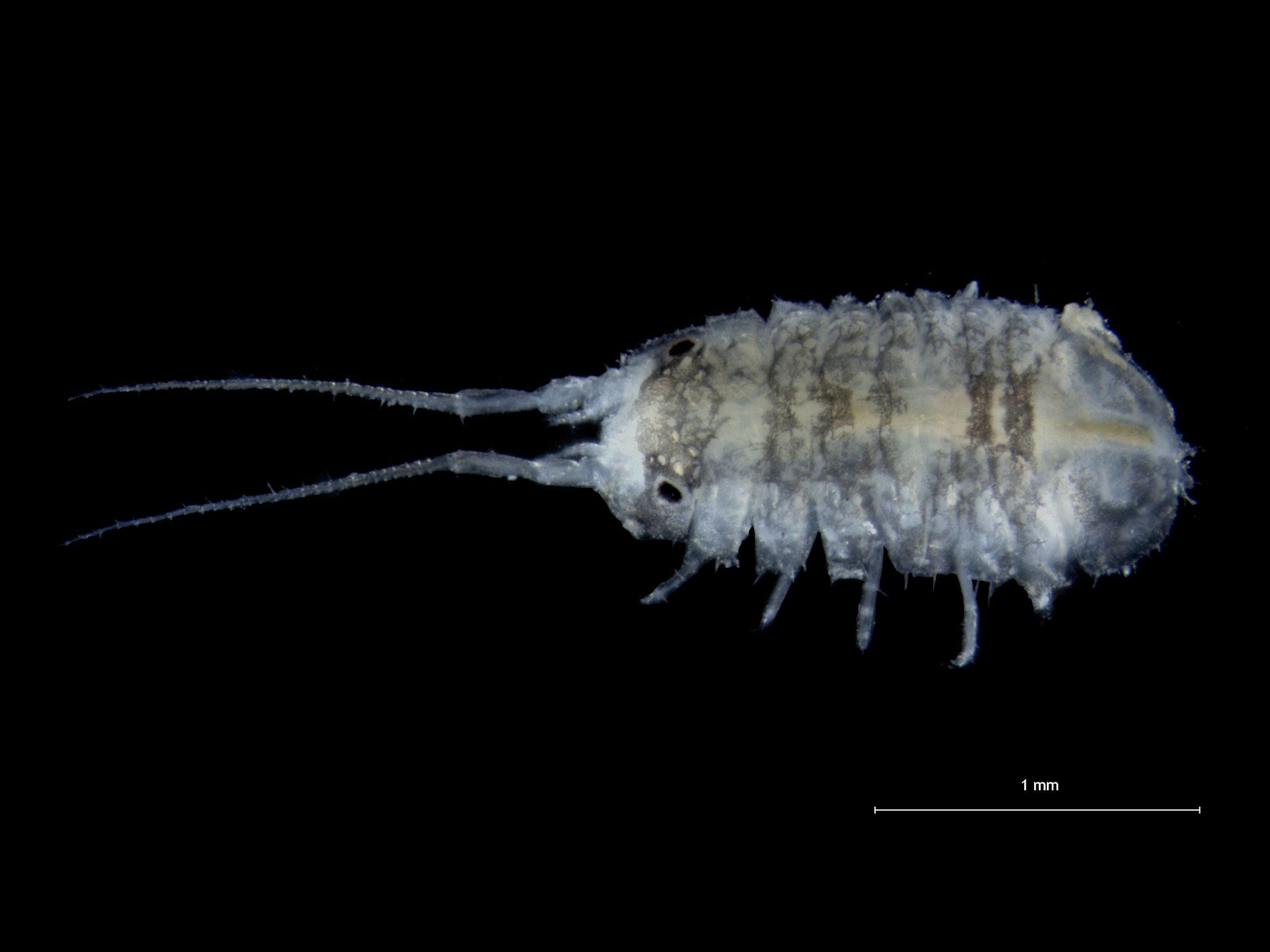
- Jaera albifrons

Scientific classification
- Kingdom: Animalia
- Phylum: Arthropoda
- Class: Malacostraca
- Order: Isopoda
- Family: Janiridae
- Genus: Jaera; Leach, 1814

= Jaera =

Genus of crustaceans

Jaera is a genus of isopods in the family Janiridae. There are more than 20 described species in Jaera.

== Species ==
These 22 species belong to the genus Jaera:

- Jaera albifrons Leach, 1814
- Jaera bocqueti Veuille & Kocatas, 1979
- Jaera caspica Kesselyak, 1938
- Jaera danubica Brtek, 2003
- Jaera forsmani Bocquet, 1950
- Jaera hopeana Costa, 1853
- Jaera ischiosetosa Forsman, 1949
- Jaera istri Veuille, 1979
- Jaera italica Kesselyak, 1938
- Jaera maculosa Leach, 1814
- Jaera marina
- Jaera nordica Lemercier, 1958
- Jaera nordmanni (Rathke, 1837)
- Jaera petiti Schulz, 1953
- Jaera posthirsuta Forsman, 1949
- Jaera praehirsuta Forsman, 1949
- Jaera sarsi Valkanov, 1936
- Jaera schellenbergi Kesselyak, 1938
- Jaera sorrentina Verhoeff, 1943
- Jaera syei Bocquet, 1950
- Jaera tyleri Brandt & Malyutina, 2014
- Jaera wakishiana Bate, 1865
