= Ischnomesidae =

Scientific classification
- Kingdom: Animalia
- Phylum: Arthropoda
- Class: Malacostraca
- Order: Isopoda
- Superfamily: Janiroidea
- Family: Ischnomesidae; Hansen, 1916

Family of crustaceans

Ischnomesidae is a family of isopods belonging to the suborder Asellota.

== Genera ==
The family contains the following genera:

- Contrarimesus Kavanagh & Wilson, 2007
- Cornuamesus Kavanagh & Wilson, 2007
- Fortimesus Kavanagh & Wilson, 2007
- Gracilimesus Kavanagh & Wilson, 2007
- Haplomesus Richardson, 1908
- Heteromesus Richardson, 1908
- Ischnomesus Richardson, 1908
- Mixomesus Wolff, 1962
- Stylomesus Wolff, 1956
