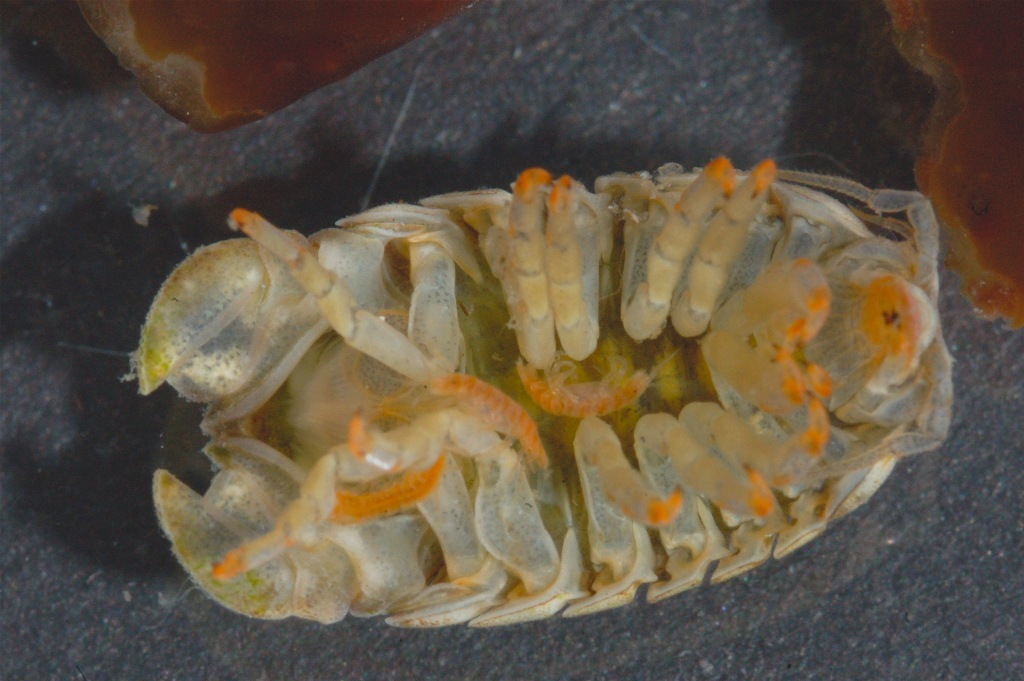
- Several orange-coloured specimens in the brood pouch of a larger isopod

Scientific classification
- Kingdom: Animalia
- Phylum: Arthropoda
- Class: Malacostraca
- Order: Isopoda
- Family: Janiridae
- Genus: Iais
- Species: I. pubescens

Binomial name
- Iais pubescens Dana, 1853

Synonyms
- Jaera pubescens Dana, 1853

= Iais pubescens =

Species of crustacean

Iais pubescens is a species of marine isopod in the family Janiridae. It inhabits seashores in a large number of locations in the Southern Hemisphere and may be found both free-living, and as commensals on larger isopods.

== Description ==
I. pubescens is a small species with an average body length of 2.5 mm. The body is covered with fine, short bristles. Eyes are present but weakly developed, consisting of two ocelli. Uropods are short and the forward margin of the head segment is straight. Individuals generally live for less than 7 months.

== Distribution ==
The species was originally described from Tierra del Fuego but has been reported from a wide range of locations in the Southern Hemisphere, including the coasts of South Africa, Antarctica, the Falkland Islands, Tristan da Cunha, Marion and Gough Islands, New Zealand, Tasmania, and the Kerguelen islands.

== Ecology ==
I. pubescens may be encountered both free-living in the inter-tidal and sub-tidal zone, at depths of up to 5 m, and as a commensal in the brood pouch of larger isopods. Host genera include Sphaeroma, Exosphaeroma and Dynamenella. On the host Exosphaeroma obtusum, the reproduction of the host was found not to be impacted although up to 25 Iais individuals could be carried at one time. The species has evolved an unusual mating system (documented in commensal-living individuals) that involves males actively seeking out newly born virgin females and retaining them in their own brood pouches for several days, fertilizing and releasing them shortly after their first moult. This pattern may have evolved in response to low encounter probabilities between sexes when carried around on their highly mobile hosts.
