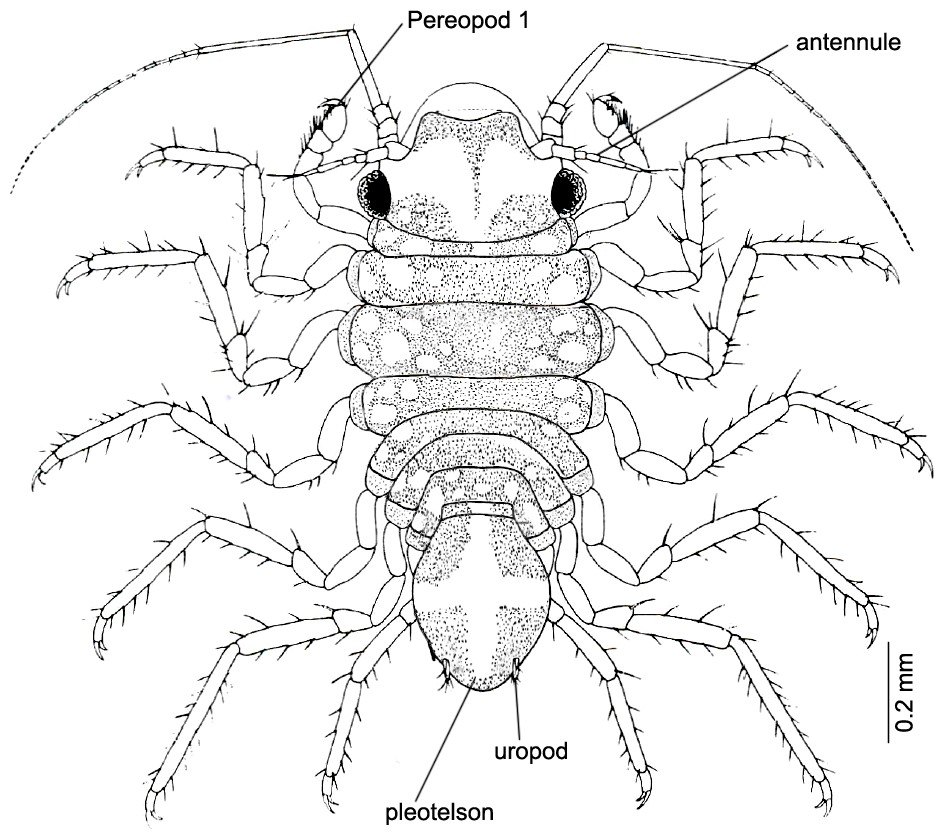
- adult male, dorsal view (showing pigmentation)

Scientific classification
- Kingdom: Animalia
- Phylum: Arthropoda
- Class: Malacostraca
- Order: Isopoda
- Family: Munnidae
- Genus: Uromunna
- Species: U. sheltoni

Binomial name
- Uromunna sheltoni (Kensley, 1977)

Synonyms
- Munna sheltoni Kensley, 1977

= Uromunna sheltoni =

Species of crustacean

Uromunna sheltoni is a species of isopod first described by Brian Kensley in 1977. U. sheltoni is included in the genus Uromunna and family Munnidae. No subspecies are listed. The species was first collected by Peter Shelton of the University of Cape Town, for whom it is named.

== Description ==
Males are 1.2 mm, and ovigerous females are 1.6 mm in total length. The antennule has a single terminal aesthetasc. The mandible lacks palpi; the incisor has four cusps and a spine-row of three or four spines; the molar is stout and distally truncated. The pereon dorsally lacks setae.

U. sheltoni closely resembles Munna lundae from southern Chile, but differs in having a relatively broader pereon and pleotelson. Differences also exist in the spination and shape of the apex of the male first pleopod, the relative lengths of the antennular segments, and the shape and spination of the pereiopods. The colour pattern, especially the distinctive cruciform pigmentation of the pleotelson, makes this species easily recognisable.

== Distribution ==
U. sheltoni is found in estuaries in South Africa and is part of a diverse epifauna associated with the macroalgae, including several dipterans, gastropods, isopods, and amphipods. U. sheltoni has been recorded at: Sandvlei Estuary, False Bay, Western Cape, on ruppia weed in water of 9‰ salinity; Kosi Lake complex (Kwa-Zulu Natal), on Potamogeton weed; and Lake Sibhayi (KwaZulu-Natal) on submerged vegetation.
