= Dendrotionidae =

Scientific classification
- Kingdom: Animalia
- Phylum: Arthropoda
- Clade: Pancrustacea
- Class: Malacostraca
- Order: Isopoda
- Superfamily: Janiroidea
- Family: Dendrotionidae

Synonyms
- Dendrotiidae

Family of crustaceans

Dendrotionidae is a family of marine deep sea isopods belonging to the suborder Asellota.

== Genera ==
The family includes the following Genera:

- Acanthomunna Beddard, 1886
- Dendromunna Menzies, 1962
- Dendrotion Sars, 1872
- Pleurotion Sars, 1897
