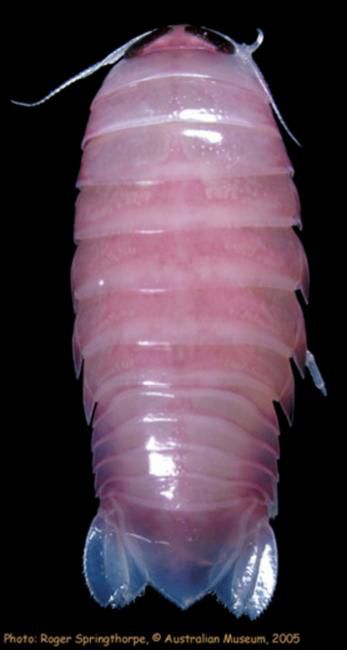
- Aegiochus piihuka

Scientific classification
- Kingdom: Animalia
- Phylum: Arthropoda
- Class: Malacostraca
- Order: Isopoda
- Family: Aegidae
- Genus: Aegiochus; Bovallius, 1885

= Aegiochus =

Genus of crustaceans

Aegiochus is a genus of isopods in the family Aegidae, first described in 1885 by Carl Bovallius. The type species is Aega ventrosa.

== Species ==
Species accepted by WoRMS are:

- Aegiochus antarctica (Hodgson, 1910)
- Aegiochus arctica (Lütken, 1859)
- Aegiochus australis (Whitelegge, 1901)
- Aegiochus beri (Bruce, 1983)
- Aegiochus bertrandi Bruce, 2009
- Aegiochus coroo (Bruce, 1983)
- Aegiochus crozetensis (Kussakin & Vasina, 1982)
- Aegiochus cyclops Haswell, 1882)
- Aegiochus dentata (Schioedte & Meinert, 1879)
- Aegiochus dollfusi (Monod, 1933)
- Aegiochus francoisae (Wetzer, 1990)
- Aegiochus glacialis (Tattersall, 1920)
- Aegiochus gordoni Bruce, 2009
- Aegiochus gracilipes (Hansen, 1895)
- Aegiochus incisa (Schioedte & Meinert, 1879)
- Aegiochus insomnis Bruce, 2009
- Aegiochus kakai Bruce, 2009
- Aegiochus kanohi Bruce, 2009
- Aegiochus laevis (Studer, 1884)
- Aegiochus leptonica (Bruce, 1988)
- Aegiochus longicornis (Hansen, 1897)
- Aegiochus nohinohi Bruce, 2009
- Aegiochus perulis (Menzies & George, 1972)
- Aegiochus piihuka Bruce, 2009
- Aegiochus plebeia (Hansen, 1897)
- Aegiochus pushkini (Kussakin & Vasina, 1982)
- Aegiochus quadratasinus (Richardson, 1903)
- Aegiochus riwha Bruce, 2009
- Aegiochus sarsae (Brandt & Andres, 2008)
- Aegiochus spongiophila (Semper, 1867)
- Aegiochus symmetrica (Richardson, 1905)
- Aegiochus synopthalma (Richardson, 1909)
- Aegiochus tenuipes (Schioedte & Meinert, 1879)
- Aegiochus tumida Nunomura, 1988)
- Aegiochus uschakovi (Kussakin, 1967)
- Aegiochus ventrosa (M. Sars, 1859)
- Aegiochus vigilans (Haswell, 1881)
- Aegiochus weberi (Nierstrasz, 1931)
