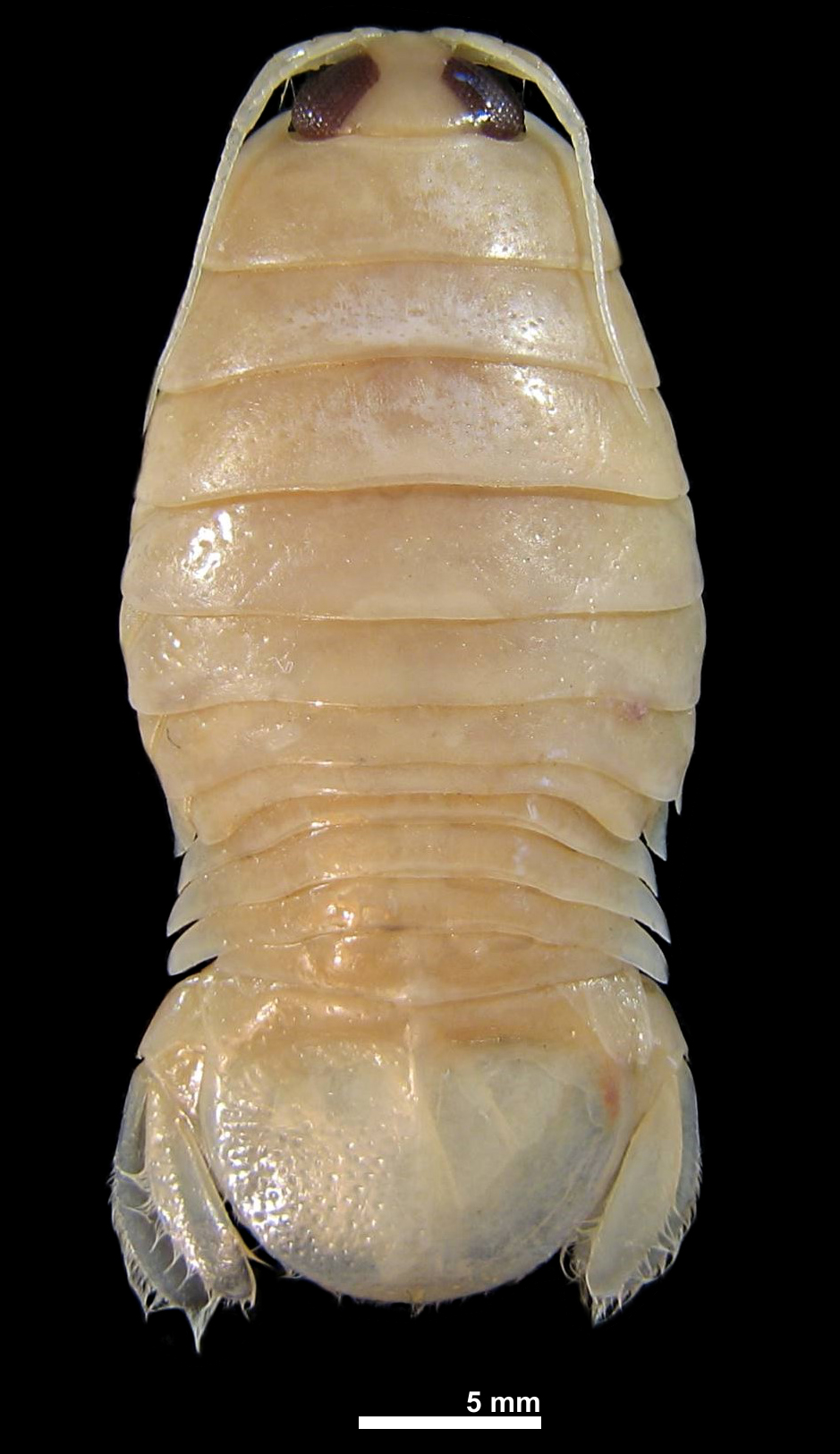
- Rocinela murilloi

Scientific classification
- Kingdom: Animalia
- Phylum: Arthropoda
- Class: Malacostraca
- Order: Isopoda
- Family: Aegidae
- Genus: Rocinela; Leach, 1818

Type species
- Rocinela danmoniensis Leach, 1818

= Rocinela =

Genus of crustaceans

Rocinela is a genus of isopods in the family Aegidae, and was first described in 1818 by William Elford Leach. The type species is Rocinela danmoniensis Leach, 1818.

== Species ==
Species accepted by WoRMS:

- Rocinela affinis Richardson, 1904
- Rocinela americana Schioedte & Meinert, 1879
- Rocinela angustata Richardson, 1904
- Rocinela australis Schioedte & Meinert, 1879
- Rocinela belliceps (Stimpson, 1864)
- Rocinela bonita Bruce, 2009
- Rocinela cornuta Richardson, 1898
- Rocinela cubensis Richardson, 1898
- Rocinela danmoniensis Leach, 1818
- Rocinela dumerilii (Lucas, 1849)
- Rocinela garricki Hurley, 1957
- Rocinela granulosa Barnard, 1914
- Rocinela hawaiiensis Richardson, 1904
- Rocinela insularis Schioedte & Meinert, 1879
- Rocinela japonica Richardson, 1898
- Rocinela juvenalis Menzies & George, 1972
- Rocinela kapala Bruce, 1988
- Rocinela laticauda Hansen, 1897
- Rocinela leptopus Bruce, 2009
- Rocinela lukini Vasina, 1993
- Rocinela maculata Schioedte & Meinert, 1879
- Rocinela media Nierstrasz, 1931
- Rocinela modesta Hansen, 1897
- Rocinela murilloi Brusca & Iverson, 1985
- Rocinela niponia Richardson, 1909
- Rocinela oculata Harger, 1883
- Rocinela ophthalmica Milne Edwards, 1840
- Rocinela orientalis Schioedte & Meinert, 1879
- Rocinela pakari Bruce, 2009
- Rocinela patriciae Brasil Lima, 1986
- Rocinela propodialis Richardson, 1905
- Rocinela resima Bruce, 2009
- Rocinela richardsonae Nierstrasz, 1931
- Rocinela runga Bruce, 2009
- Rocinela satagia Bruce, 2009
- Rocinela signata Schioedte & Meinert, 1879
- Rocinela sila Hale, 1925
- Rocinela tridens Hatch, 1947
- Rocinela tropica Brasil Lima, 1986
- Rocinela tuberculosa Richardson, 1898
- Rocinela wetzeri Brusca & France, 1992
