= Echinothambematidae =

Scientific classification
- Kingdom: Animalia
- Phylum: Arthropoda
- Clade: Pancrustacea
- Class: Malacostraca
- Order: Isopoda
- Superfamily: Janiroidea
- Family: Echinothambematidae

Family of crustaceans

Echinothambematidae is a family of deep sea isopods belonging to the suborder Asellota.

== Genera ==
The family contains the following genera:

- Echinothambema Menzies, 1956
- Vemathambema Menzies, 1962
