= Nannoniscus =

Scientific classification
- Kingdom: Animalia
- Phylum: Arthropoda
- Class: Malacostraca
- Order: Isopoda
- Family: Nannoniscidae
- Genus: Nannoniscus; Hansen, 1916

Genus of crustaceans

Nannoniscus is genus of isopod crustaceans.

== Species ==
The following species are included within the genus Nannoniscus:

- Nannoniscus acanthurus Birstein, 1963
- Nannoniscus aequiremus Hansen, 1916
- Nannoniscus affinis Hansen, 1916
- Nannoniscus analis Hansen, 1916
- Nannoniscus antennaspinis Brandt, 2002
- Nannoniscus arcticus Hansen, 1916
- Nannoniscus arctoabyssalis Just, 1980
- Nannoniscus australis Vanhöffen, 1914
- Nannoniscus bidens Vanhöffen, 1914
- Nannoniscus brenkei Kaiser & Kihara, 2021
- Nannoniscus camayae Menzies, 1962
- Nannoniscus caspius G. O. Sars, 1897
- Nannoniscus coalescum (Menzies & George, 1972)
- Nannoniscus cristatus Mezhov, 1986
- Nannoniscus detrimentus Menzies & George, 1972
- Nannoniscus hilario Kaiser & Kihara, 2021
- Nannoniscus inermis Hansen, 1916
- Nannoniscus laevis Menzies, 1962
- Nannoniscus laticeps Hansen, 1916
- Nannoniscus magdae Kaiser & Kihara, 2021
- Nannoniscus menoti Kaiser & Kihara, 2021
- Nannoniscus menziesi Mezhov, 1986
- Nannoniscus meteori (Brandt, 2002)
- Nannoniscus minutus Hansen, 1916
- Nannoniscus muscarius Menzies & George, 1972
- Nannoniscus oblongus G. O. Sars, 1870
- Nannoniscus ovatus Menzies & George, 1972
- Nannoniscus pedroKaiser & Kihara, 2021
- Nannoniscus perunis Menzies & George, 1972
- Nannoniscus plebejus Hansen, 1916
- Nannoniscus profundus Svavarsson, 1982
- Nannoniscus reticulatus Hansen, 1916
- Nannoniscus simplex Hansen, 1916
- Nannoniscus spinicornis Hansen, 1916
- Nannoniscus teres Siebenaller & Hessler, 1981
