= Pentaceration =

Scientific classification
- Kingdom: Animalia
- Phylum: Arthropoda
- Class: Malacostraca
- Order: Isopoda
- Family: Paramunnidae
- Genus: Pentaceration; Just, 2009

Genus of isopods

Pentaceration is a genus of isopods, species being found mainly around Australia and New Zealand. It contains the following species:

- Pentaceration bassiana
- Pentaceration bifida
- Pentaceration bovicornis
- Pentaceration curvicornis
- Pentaceration denticornis
- Pentaceration dentifera
- Pentaceration epipedos
- Pentaceration forkandbrewer
- Pentaceration globopleonis
- Pentaceration kermadecia
- Pentaceration lancifera
- Pentaceration magna
- Pentaceration megalomos
- Pentaceration novaezealandia
- Pentaceration omalos
- Pentaceration rihothalassa
- Pentaceration serrata
- Pentaceration setosa
- Pentaceration simplex
- Pentaceration spinosissima
- Pentaceration tasmaniensis
