= Chelator (crustacean) =

Scientific classification
- Kingdom: Animalia
- Phylum: Arthropoda
- Class: Malacostraca
- Order: Isopoda
- Family: Desmosomatidae
- Genus: Chelator; Hessler, 1970

Genus of crustacean

Chelator is a genus of marine isopods, belonging to the family Desmosomatidae.

== Species ==
Chelator includes the following species:

- Chelator aequabilis
- Chelator chelatus
- Chelator insignis
- Chelator michaeli
- Chelator rugosus
- Chelator stellae
- Chelator striatus
- Chelator verecundus
- Chelator vulgaris
