= Acanthaspidiidae =

Scientific classification
- Kingdom: Animalia
- Phylum: Arthropoda
- Clade: Pancrustacea
- Class: Malacostraca
- Order: Isopoda
- Superfamily: Janiroidea
- Family: Acanthaspidiidae

Family of crustaceans

Acanthaspidiidae is a spike-like family of isopods belonging to the suborder Asellota.

== Genera ==
The family contains the following genera:

- Ianthopsis Beddard, 1886
- Iolanthe Beddard, 1886
- Mexicope Hooker, 1985
