= Mictosoma =

Scientific classification
- Kingdom: Animalia
- Phylum: Arthropoda
- Class: Malacostraca
- Order: Isopoda
- Suborder: Asellota
- Superfamily: Janiroidea
- Family: Mictosomatidae
- Genus: Mictosoma; Wolff, 1965
- Species: M. ramosum

Binomial name
- Mictosoma ramosum (Hansen, 1916)

Genus of crustaceans

Mictosoma is a monotypic genus of crustaceans belonging to the monotypic family Mictosomatidae. The only species is Mictosoma ramosum.

The species is found in Northern Europe.
