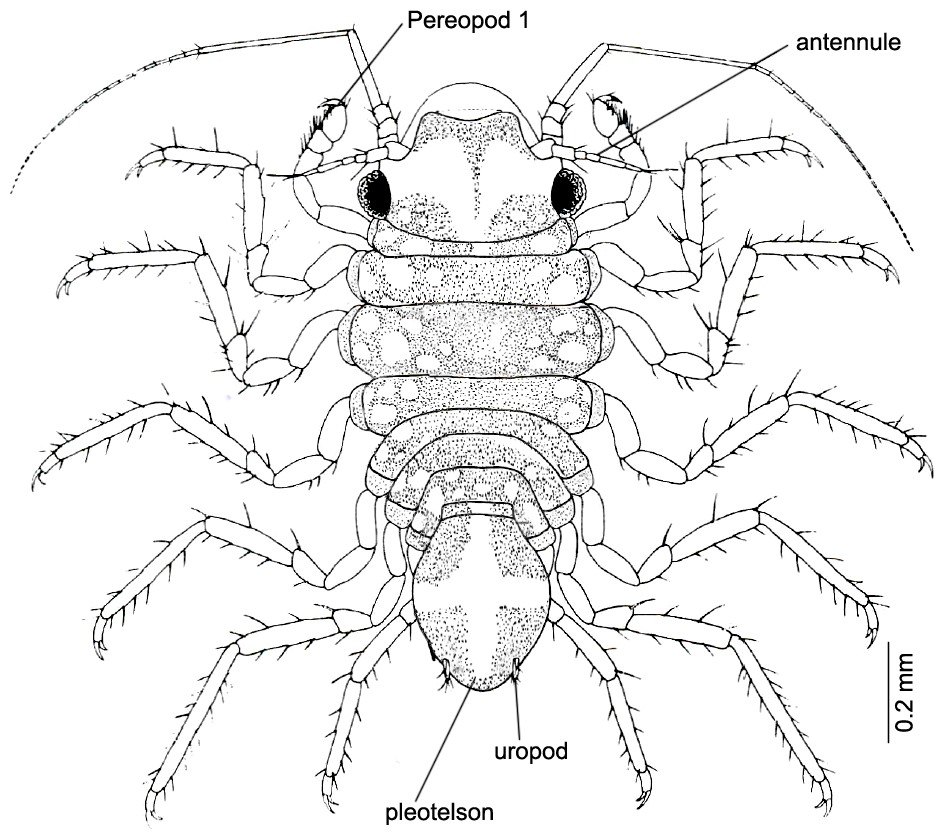
- Uromunna sheltoni

Scientific classification
- Kingdom: Animalia
- Phylum: Arthropoda
- Class: Malacostraca
- Order: Isopoda
- Family: Munnidae
- Genus: Uromunna; Menzies, 1962

= Uromunna =

Genus of crustaceans

Uromunna is a genus of isopod crustaceans.

== Genera ==
The genus contains the following species:

- Uromunna acarina (Miller, 1941)
- Uromunna biloba Kensley, 2003
- Uromunna brevicornis (Thomson, 1946)
- Uromunna cananeia Pires, 1985
- Uromunna caribea (Carvacho, 1977)
- Uromunna deodata Müller, 1993
- Uromunna eora Esquete & Wilson, 2016
- Uromunna hayesi (Robertson, 1978)
- Uromunna humei Poore, 1984
- Uromunna jejuensis Kim, Kim, Lee & Karanovic, 2023
- Uromunna mediterranea (Pierantoni, 1916)
- Uromunna mundongensis Kim, Kim, Lee & Karanovic, 2023
- Uromunna naherba Esquete, Wilson & Troncoso, 2014
- Uromunna nana (Nordenstam, 1933)
- Uromunna peterseni Pires, 1985
- Uromunna petiti (Amar, 1948)
- Uromunna phillipi Poore, 1984
- Uromunna powelli (Kensley, 1980)
- Uromunna reynoldsi (Frankenberg & Menzies, 1966)
- Uromunna rhamnda Esquete & Wilson, 2016
- Uromunna samariensis Wolff & Brandt, 2000
- Uromunna santaluciae (Gascon & Mane-Garzon, 1974)
- Uromunna schauinslandi (G. O. Sars, 1899)
- Uromunna serricauda Müller, 1992
- Uromunna sheltoni (Kensley, 1977)
- Uromunna similis (Fresi & Mazzella, 1971)
- Uromunna tenagoika Esquete & Wilson, 2016
- Uromunna ubiquita (Menzies, 1952)
