= Mesosignidae =

Scientific classification
- Kingdom: Animalia
- Phylum: Arthropoda
- Clade: Pancrustacea
- Class: Malacostraca
- Order: Isopoda
- Superfamily: Janiroidea
- Family: Mesosignidae

Family of crustaceans

Mesosignidae is a family of crustaceans belonging to the order Isopoda in the suborder Asellota.

Genera:

- Bermudasignum George, 2003
- Costasignum George, 2003
- Japanosignum George, 2003
- Kurilosignum George, 2003
- Mesosignum Menzies, 1962
