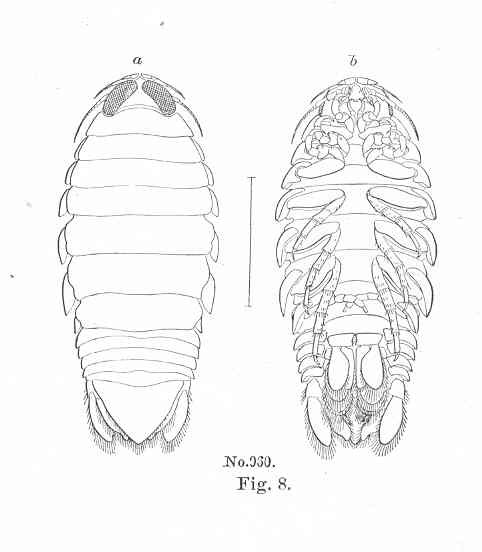
- Aega psora

Scientific classification
- Kingdom: Animalia
- Phylum: Arthropoda
- Clade: Pancrustacea
- Class: Malacostraca
- Order: Isopoda
- Family: Aegidae
- Genus: Aega; Leach, 1815

Synonyms
- Aegacylla Dana, 1852; Pterelas Guérin-Méneville, 1836

= Aega (crustacean) =

Genus of crustaceans

Aega is a genus of isopods in the family Aegidae, containing the following species:

- Aega acuminata Hansen, 1897
- Aega acuticauda Richardson, 1910
- Aega affinis Milne Edwards, 1840
- Aega angustata Whitelegge, 1901
- Aega antennata Richardson, 1910
- Aega approximata Richardson, 1910
- Aega bicarinata Leach, 1818
- Aega chelipous Barnard, 1960
- Aega concinna Hale, 1940
- Aega crenulata Lutken, 1859
- Aega dofleini Thielemann, 1910
- Aega ecarinata Richardson, 1898
- Aega falcata Kensley & Chan, 2001
- Aega falklandica Kussakin, 1967
- Aega hamiota Bruce, 2004
- Aega hirsuta Schiödte & Meinert, 1879
- Aega komai Bruce, 1996
- Aega lecontii (Dana, 1853)
- Aega leptonica Bruce, 1988
- Aega magnifica (Dana, 1853)
- Aega maxima Hansen, 1897
- Aega megalops Norman & Stebbing, 1886
- Aega microphthalma Dana, 1853
- Aega monophthalma Johnston, 1834
- Aega nanhaiensis Yu, 2007
- Aega platyantennata Nunomura, 1993
- Aega psora (Linnaeus, 1758)
- Aega punctulata Miers, 1881
- Aega semicarinata Miers, 1875
- Aega serripes H. Milne Edwards, 1840
- Aega sheni Yu & Bruce, 2006
- Aega stevelowei Bruce, 2009
- Aega tridens Leach, 1815
- Aega truncata Richardson, 1910
- Aega urotoma Barnard, 1914
- Aega webbii (Guérin-Méneville, 1836)
- Aega whanui Bruce, 2009
