= Katianiridae =

Scientific classification
- Kingdom: Animalia
- Phylum: Arthropoda
- Class: Malacostraca
- Order: Isopoda
- Superfamily: Janiroidea
- Family: Katianiridae

Family of crustaceans

Katianiridae is a family of crustaceans belonging to the order Isopoda.

Genera:

- Katianir Hansen, 1916
- Natalianira Kensley, 1984
