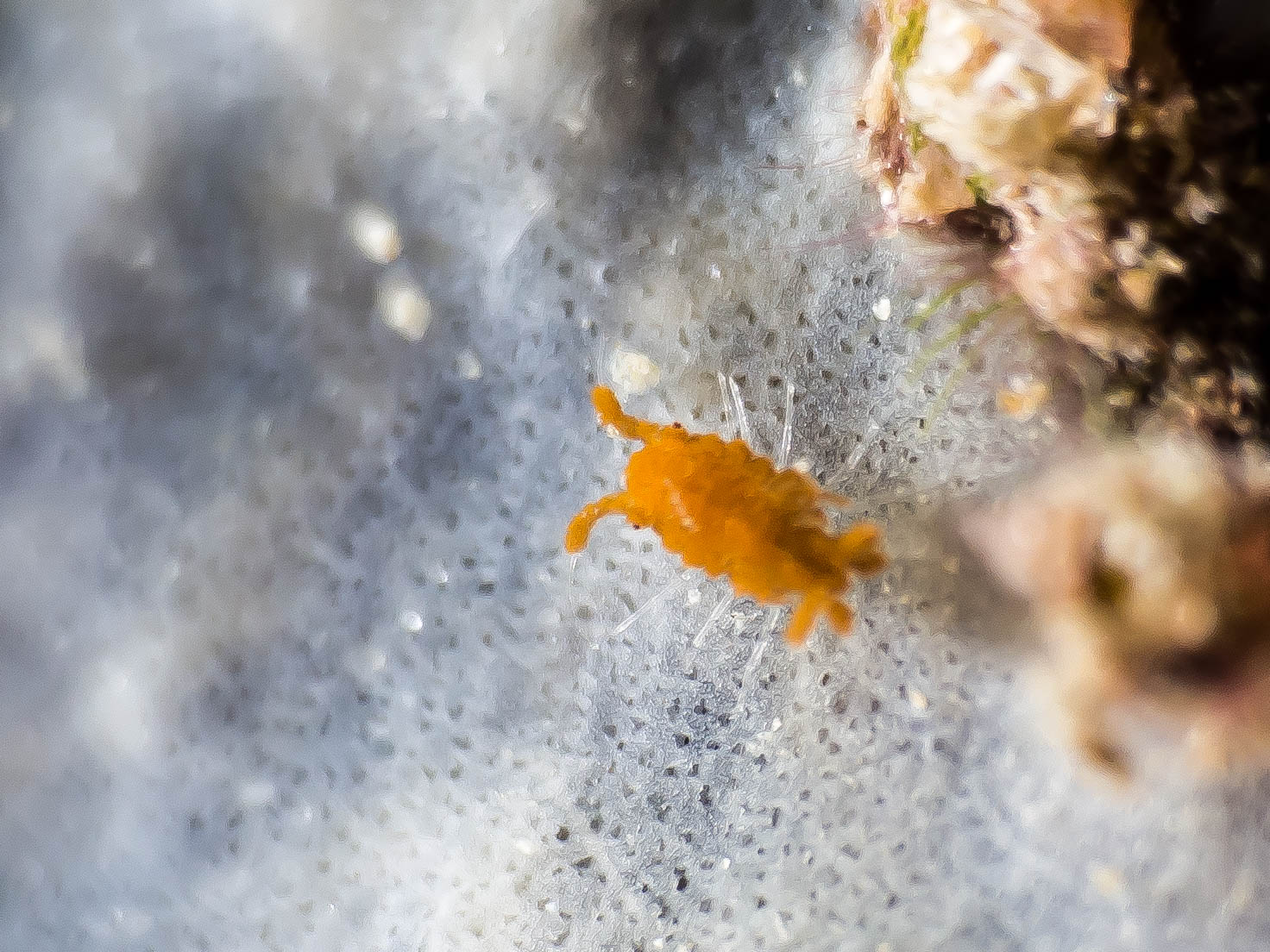
- A sponge isopod (Santia sp.) from Halmahera, Indonesia

Scientific classification
- Kingdom: Animalia
- Phylum: Arthropoda
- Class: Malacostraca
- Order: Isopoda
- Superfamily: Janiroidea
- Family: Santiidae

= Santiidae =

Family of crustaceans

Santiidae is a family of crustaceans belonging to the order Isopoda.

Genera:

- Halacarsantia Wolff, 1989
- Kuphomunna Barnard, 1914
- Prethura Kensley, 1982
- Santia Sivertsen & Holthuis, 1980
- Spinosantia Wolff & Brandt, 2000
