= Microcerberidae =

Scientific classification
- Kingdom: Animalia
- Phylum: Arthropoda
- Clade: Pancrustacea
- Class: Malacostraca
- Order: Isopoda
- Suborder: Microcerberidea
- Family: Microcerberidae; Karaman, 1933

Genera
- Afrocerberus; Bulgarocerberus; Coxicerberus; Isoyvesia; Mexicerberus; Microcerberus; Protocerberus

Family of crustaceans

The Microcerberidae are a family of isopod crustaceans. They are less than 2 mm (0.079 in) long, and live interstitially in shallow marine or freshwater sand habitats.

Marine microcerberids comprise the main part species diversity, but are very alike. As a group, they have very broad distribution:

- the majority of Coxicerberus: Americas, southern coasts of Europe, Africa, warm waters of Asia, New Zealand
- "Microcerberus" monodi: Angola

Freshwater taxa are less abundant in species number (only 12 species), but are more morphologically diverse and include seven or eight genera. They have these distributions:

- Afrocerberus and Protocerberus: central and southern Africa
- Bulgarocerberus: Bulgaria
- Isoyvesia: Cuba
- Mexicerberus: Mexico
- Microcerberus: South Carolina, Romania, Bulgaria and Macedonia
- "Microcerberus" remyi: Morocco
- Coxicerberus ruffoi: northern Italy
