= Pleurocope =

Scientific classification
- Kingdom: Animalia
- Phylum: Arthropoda
- Class: Malacostraca
- Order: Isopoda
- Suborder: Asellota
- Superfamily: Janiroidea
- Family: Pleurocopidae
- Genus: Pleurocope; Walker, 1901

Genus of crustaceans

Pleurocope is a genus of crustaceans belonging to the monotypic family Pleurocopidae.

The species of this genus are found in Central America.

Species:

- Pleurocope dasyura Walker, 1901
- Pleurocope floridensis Hooker, 1985
- Pleurocope iriomotensis Shimomura & Naruse, 2015
- Pleurocope wilsoni Kensley & Schotte, 2002
