= Pseudojaniridae =

Scientific classification
- Kingdom: Animalia
- Phylum: Arthropoda
- Class: Malacostraca
- Order: Isopoda
- Superfamily: Stenetrioidea
- Family: Pseudojaniridae

Family of crustaceans

Pseudojaniridae is a family of crustaceans belonging to the order Isopoda.

Genera:

- Adajinoperus Serov & Wilson, 1999
- Pseudojanira Barnard, 1925
- Schottea Serov & Wilson, 1999
