= Thambematidae =

Scientific classification
- Kingdom: Animalia
- Phylum: Arthropoda
- Class: Malacostraca
- Order: Isopoda
- Superfamily: Janiroidea
- Family: Thambematidae

Family of crustaceans

Thambematidae is a family of isopods belonging to the order Isopoda.

Genera:

- Microthambema Birstein, 1961
- Thambema Stebbing, 1912
