= Protojaniridae =

Scientific classification
- Kingdom: Animalia
- Phylum: Arthropoda
- Clade: Pancrustacea
- Class: Malacostraca
- Order: Isopoda
- Superfamily: Gnathostenetroidoidea
- Family: Protojaniridae

Family of crustaceans

Protojaniridae is a family of crustaceans belonging to the order Isopoda. It is very similar to other Asellota, however the cephalothorax is more concentrated.

Genera:

- Anneckella Chappius & Delamare-Deboutteville, 1957
- Cuyojanira Grosso, 1992
- Enckella Fresi, Idato & Scipione, 1980
- Namibianira Kensley, 1995
- Protojanira Barnard, 1927
- Protojaniroides Fresi, Idato & Scipione, 1980
