= Iais =

Scientific classification
- Kingdom: Animalia
- Phylum: Arthropoda
- Class: Malacostraca
- Order: Isopoda
- Family: Janiridae
- Genus: Iais; Bovallius, 1886

Type species
- Jaera pubescens Dana, 1853

Genus of crustaceans

Iais is a genus of isopod crustaceans. Iais species are found in association with larger isopods of the family Sphaeromatidae, usually on the ventral surface of the larger animal, between the pereiopods and on the pleopods. They are native to Australasia and South America, although Iais californica and its host Sphaeroma quoyanum have invaded California, and I. californica was first described from Sausalito, California.

== Species ==
Eight species are recognised:

- Iais antarctica (Chappuis, 1958)
- Iais aquilei Coineau, 1977
- Iais californica (H. Richardson, 1904)
- Iais chilense (Winkler, 1992)
- Iais elongata Sivertsen & Holthuis, 1980
- Iais floridana Kensley & Schotte, 1999
- Iais pubescens (Dana, 1853)
- Iais singaporensis Menzies & Barnard, 1951
