= Microparasellidae =

Scientific classification
- Kingdom: Animalia
- Phylum: Arthropoda
- Class: Malacostraca
- Order: Isopoda
- Superfamily: Janiroidea
- Family: Microparasellidae

Family of crustaceans

Microparasellidae is a family of crustaceans belonging to the order Isopoda.

Genera:

- Angeliera Chappuis & Delamare-Deboutteville, 1952
- Microparasellus Karaman, 1933
