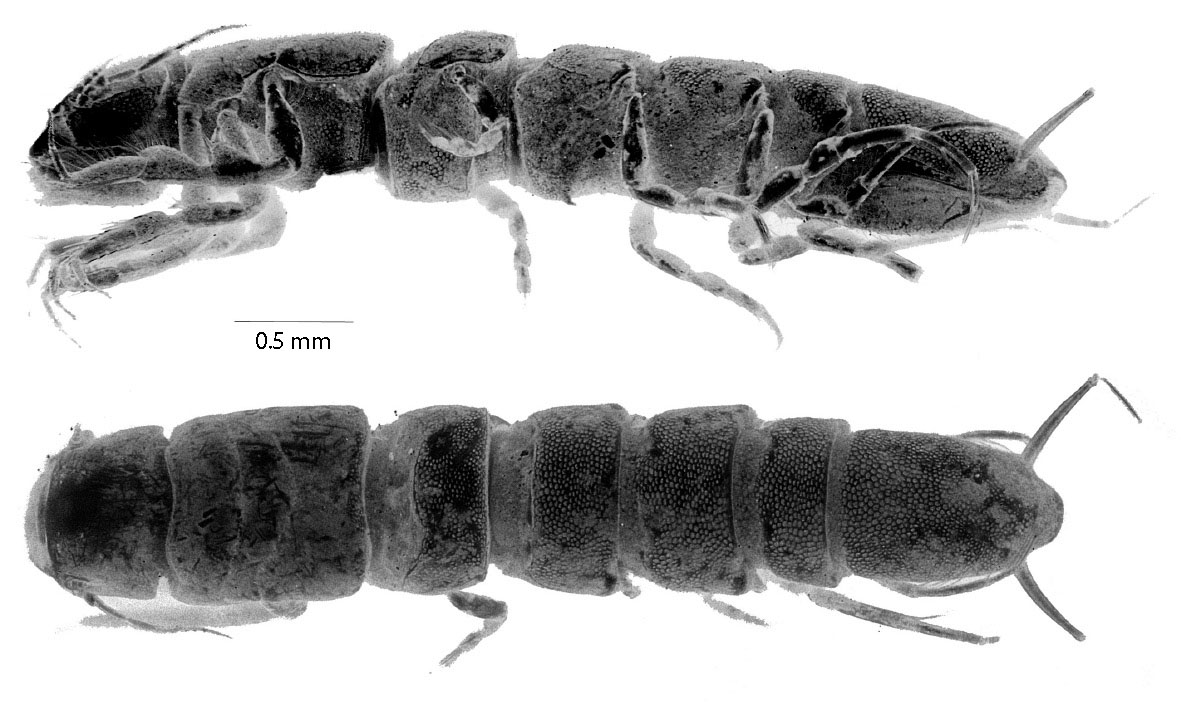
- Macrostylis uniformis

Scientific classification
- Kingdom: Animalia
- Phylum: Arthropoda
- Class: Malacostraca
- Order: Isopoda
- Superfamily: Janiroidea
- Family: Macrostylidae

= Macrostylidae =

Family of crustaceans

Macrostylidae is a family of crustaceans belonging to the order Isopoda.

Genera:

- Desmostylis Brandt, 1992
- Macrostylis Sars, 1864
