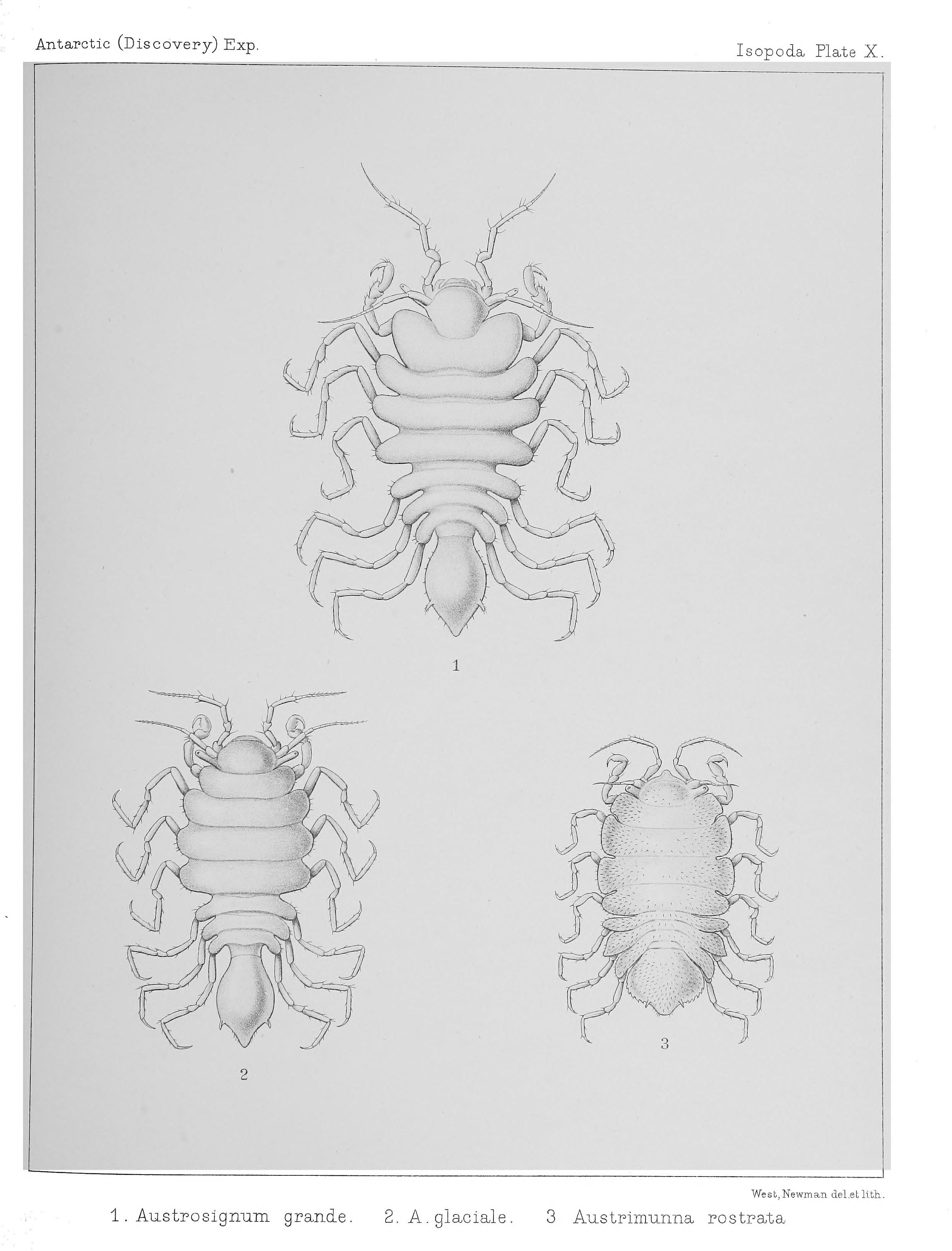
- Three members of Paramunnidae, Austrosignum grande (1), Austrosignum glaciale (2), and Austrimunna rostrata (3)

Scientific classification
- Kingdom: Animalia
- Phylum: Arthropoda
- Class: Malacostraca
- Order: Isopoda
- Suborder: Asellota
- Superfamily: Janiroidea
- Family: Paramunnidae; Vanhöffen, 1914

Synonyms
- Abyssianiridae; Pleurogoniidae; Pleurogonidae

= Paramunnidae =

Family of isopods

Paramunnidae is a family of isopods belonging to the order Isopoda.

== Genera ==
Genera:

- Abyssianira Menzies, 1956
- Acutomunna Winkler, 1994
- Advenogonium Just & Wilson, 2007
- Allorostrata Winkler, 1994
- Antennulosignum Nordenstam, 1933
- Ascionana Just & Wilson, 2004
- Austrimunna Richardson, 1906
- Austrogonium Hodgson, 1910
- Austronanus Hodgson, 1910
- Austrosignum Hodgson, 1910
- Bathygonium Kussakin & Vasina, 1984
- Boreosignum Just & Wilson, 2007
- Compoceration Just, 2009
- Coulmannia Hodgson, 1910
- Cryosignum Just & Wilson, 2007
- Dentigonium Shimomura, 2009
- Epipedonana Just & Wilson, 2004
- Fornicaris Wilson & Selden, 2016
- Harrietonana Just & Wilson, 2004
- Heterosignum Gamo, 1976
- Holodentata Doti, Choudhury & Brandt, 2009
- Kiklonana Just & Wilson, 2004
- Kussakinella Just & Wilson, 2007
- Magellianira Winkler, 1994
- Meridiosignum Just & Wilson, 2007
- Metamunna Tattersall, 1905
- Munnogonium George & Stromberg, 1968
- Neasellus Beddard, 1885
- Notoxenoides Menzies, 1962
- Notoxenus Hodgson, 1910
- Omonana Just & Wilson, 2004
- Pagonana Just & Wilson, 2004
- Palanana Just & Wilson, 2004
- Paramunna G.O.Sars, 1866
- Pentaceration Just, 2009
- Pleurogonium G.O.Sars, 1864
- Pleurosignum Vanhöffen, 1914
- Quetzogonium Just & Wilson, 2007
- Reductogonium Golovan & Malyutina, 2019
- Spiculonana Just & Wilson, 2004
- Spinogonium Shimomura, 2009
- Sporonana Just & Wilson, 2004
- Stephenseniellus Just & Wilson, 2006
- Tethygonium Just & Wilson, 2007
- Xigonus Just & Wilson, 2006
- Zizzygonium Just & Wilson, 2007
