= Stenetriidae =

Scientific classification
- Kingdom: Animalia
- Phylum: Arthropoda
- Class: Malacostraca
- Order: Isopoda
- Superfamily: Stenetrioidea
- Family: Stenetriidae; Hansen, 1905

Family of crustaceans

Stenetriidae is a family of crustaceans belonging to the order Isopoda. They can be found in both tropical and polar waters.

== Genera ==
Genera:

- Caecostenetrium
- Calafia Carvacho, 1983
- Eostenetrium Wilson & Morel, 2022
- Hansenium Serov & Wilson, 1995
- Lexcenium Serov & Wilson, 1999
- Liocoryphe Serov & Wilson, 1995
- Machatrium Bruce & Buxton, 2013
- Mizothenar Serov & Wilson, 1995
- Onychatrium Bruce & Cumming, 2015
- Protallocoxa Schultz, 1978
- Stenetrium Haswell, 1881
- Stenobermuda Schultz, 1979
- Tenupedunculus Shultz, 1982
- Tristenium Serov & Wilson, 1995
