= Joeropsididae =

Scientific classification
- Kingdom: Animalia
- Phylum: Arthropoda
- Clade: Pancrustacea
- Class: Malacostraca
- Order: Isopoda
- Superfamily: Janiroidea
- Family: Joeropsididae

Family of crustaceans

Joeropsididae is a family of crustaceans belonging to the order Isopoda, from the Lizard Island region of Australia's Great Barrier Reef.

Genera:

- Joeropsis Koehler, 1885
- Rugojoeropsis Just, 2001
- Scaphojoeropsis Just, 2001
