= Gnathostenetroididae =

Scientific classification
- Kingdom: Animalia
- Phylum: Arthropoda
- Clade: Pancrustacea
- Class: Malacostraca
- Order: Isopoda
- Superfamily: Gnathostenetroidoidea
- Family: Gnathostenetroididae

Family of crustaceans

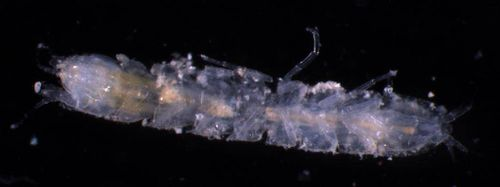
Maresiella polynesica

Gnathostenetroididae is a family of crustaceans belonging to the order Isopoda, and is the smallest asellote.

Genera:

- Caecostenetroides Fresi & Schiecke, 1968
- Gnathostenetroides Amar, 1957
- Maresiella Fresi & Scipione, 1980
- Neostenetroides Carpenter & Magniez, 1982
- Wiyufiloides Pérez-Schultheiss & Wilson, 2021
