= Desmosomatidae =

Scientific classification
- Kingdom: Animalia
- Phylum: Arthropoda
- Class: Malacostraca
- Order: Isopoda
- Superfamily: Janiroidea
- Family: Desmosomatidae; G. O. Sars, 1897

Synonyms
- Desmosomidae; Pseudomesidae

Family of crustaceans

Desmosomatidae is a family of isopods belonging to the suborder Asellota.

== Genera ==
Desmosomatidae contains the following Subfamilies and Genera:

- Desmosomatinae Sars, 1897
  - Balbidocolon Hessler, 1970
  - Desmosoma Sars, 1864
  - Echinopleura Sars, 1897
  - Eugerda Meinert, 1890
  - Mirabilicoxa Hessler, 1970
  - Momedossa Hessler, 1970
  - Pseudomesus Hansen 1916
  - Torwolia Hessler, 1970
- Eugerdellatinae Hessler, 1970
  - Chelantermedia Brix, 2006
  - Chelator Hessler, 1970
  - Chelibranchus Mezhov, 1986
  - Cryodesma Svavarsson, 1988
  - Disparella Hessler, 1970
  - Eugerdella Kussakin, 1965
  - Oecidiobranchus Hessler, 1970
  - Paradesmosoma Kussakin, 1965
  - Parvochelus Brix & Kihara, 2015
  - Prochelator Hessler, 1970
  - Reductosoma Brandt, 1992
  - Whoia Hessler, 1970
