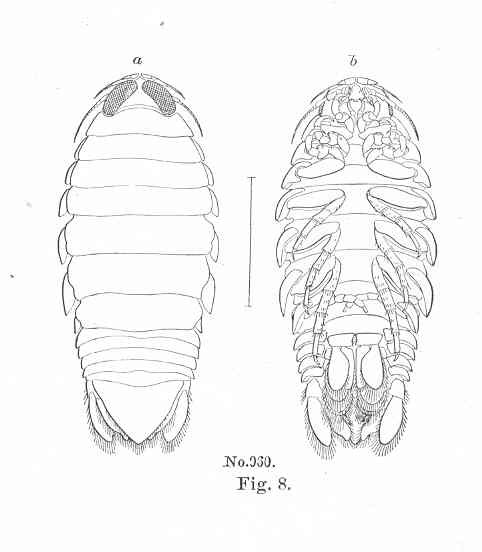
- Aega psora

Scientific classification
- Kingdom: Animalia
- Phylum: Arthropoda
- Clade: Pancrustacea
- Class: Malacostraca
- Order: Isopoda
- Suborder: Cymothoida
- Superfamily: Cymothooidea
- Family: Aegidae; White, 1850

= Aegidae =

Family of crustaceans

The Aegidae are a family of isopod crustaceans. The adults are temporary parasites of fish, feeding on their hosts' blood before dropping off to digest the meal. They differ from members of the family Cirolanidae in having only three pairs of hook-like pereiopods, whereas in Cirolanidae all seven pairs of pereiopods are hooked. The family was first described by Adam White in 1850.

The family contains the following genera:

- Aega Leach, 1815
- Aegapheles Bruce, 2009
- Aegiochus Bovallius, 1885
- Alitropus H. Milne-Edwards, 1840
- Epulaega Bruce, 2009
- Rocinela Leach, 1818
- Syscenus Harger, 1880
- Xenuraega Tattersall, 1909
