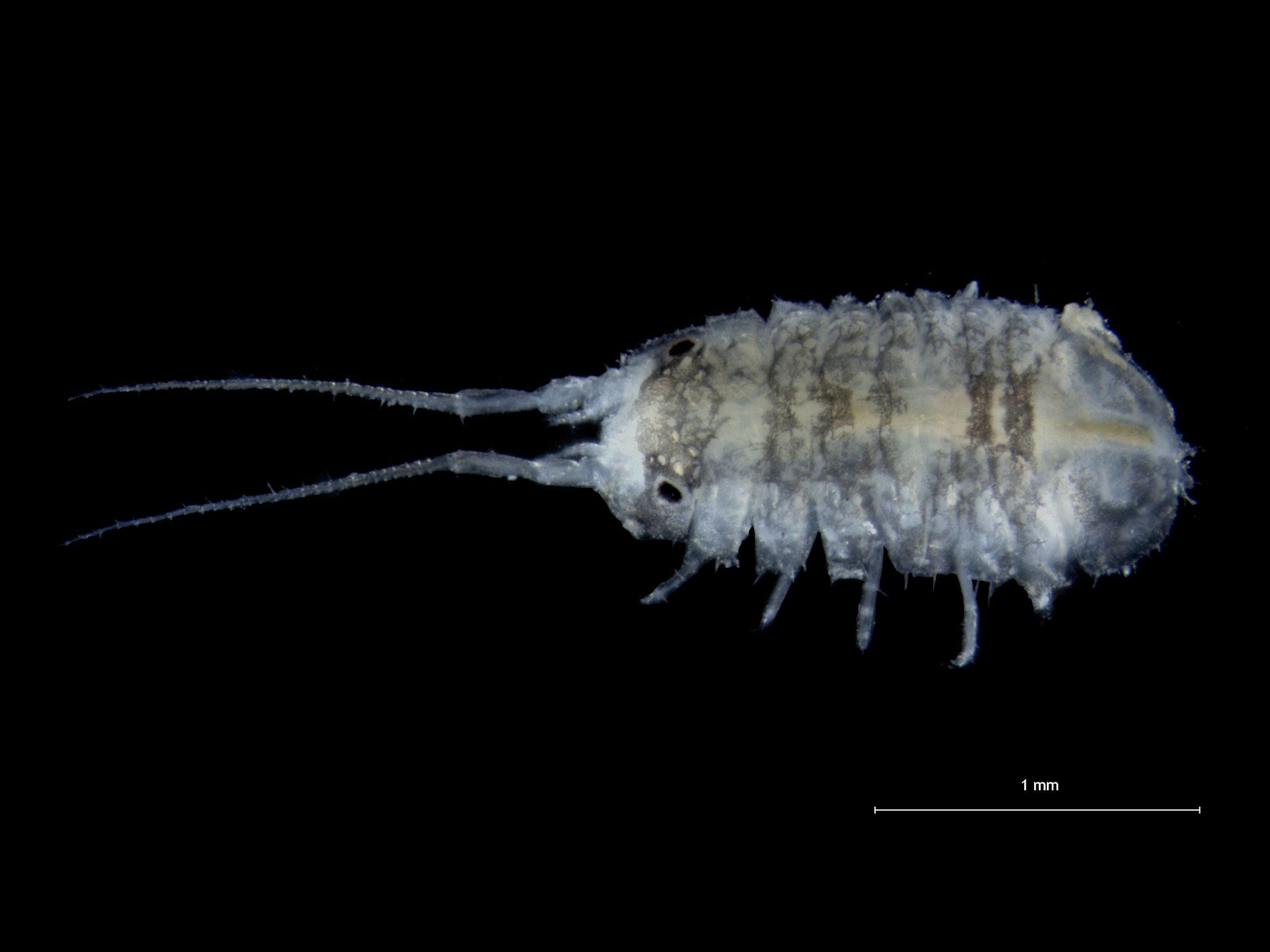
- Jaera albifrons

Scientific classification
- Kingdom: Animalia
- Phylum: Arthropoda
- Class: Malacostraca
- Order: Isopoda
- Superfamily: Janiroidea
- Family: Janiridae; Sars, 1897

= Janiridae =

Family of crustaceans

Janiridae is a family of isopods in the suborder Asellota. There are more than 20 genera in Janiridae.

== Genera ==
These 22 genera belong to the family Janiridae:

- Austrofilius Hodgson, 1910
- Caecianiropsis Menzies & Pettit, 1956
- Caecijaera Menzies, 1951
- Carpias Richardson, 1902
- Ectias Richardson, 1906
- Hawaianira Miller, 1967
- Heterias Richardson, 1904
- Iais Bovallius, 1886
- Ianiropsis G.O.Sars, 1897
- Iathrippa Bovallius, 1886
- Jaera Leach, 1814
- Janaira Moreira & Pires, 1977
- Janira Leach, 1814
- Janiralata Menzies, 1951
- Janthura Wolff, 1962
- Mackinia Matsumoto, 1956
- Microjaera Bocquet & Levi, 1955
- Microjanira Schiecke & Fresi, 1970
- Neojaera Nordenstam, 1933
- Protocharon Chappuis, Delamare Deboutteville & Paulian, 1956
- Rostrobagatus Müller, 1993
- Trogloianiropsis Jaume, 1995
