= List of vulnerable arthropods =

- Extinct in the wild (EW): 2 species
- Critically endangered (CR): 850 species
- Endangered (EN): 1,531 species
- Vulnerable (VU): 1,574 species
- Near threatened (NT, LR/cd): 1,118 species
- Least concern (LC): 8,632 species
- Data deficient (DD): 4,643 species
Arthropod species (IUCN, 2025-2)
- 18431 extant species have been evaluated
- 13788 of those are fully assessed (Note: excludes data deficient evaluations.)
- 9750 are not threatened at present
- 4223 to 8866 are threatened (Note: Threatened comprises CR, EN and VU. Upper estimate additionally includes DD.)
- 83 to 261 are extinct or extinct in the wild:
  - 81 extinct (EX) species (Note: Chart omits extinct (EX) species)
  - 2 extinct in the wild (EW)
  - 171 possibly extinct [CR(PE)]
  - 1 possibly extinct in the wild [CR(PEW)]

Vulnerable (VU) species are considered to be facing a high risk of extinction in the wild.

In July 2016, the International Union for Conservation of Nature (IUCN) listed 1080 vulnerable arthropod species. Of all evaluated arthropod species, 11% are listed as vulnerable. The IUCN also lists 29 arthropod subspecies as vulnerable.

No subpopulations of arthropods have been evaluated by the IUCN.

For a species to be assessed as vulnerable to extinction the best available evidence must meet quantitative criteria set by the IUCN designed to reflect "a high risk of extinction in the wild". Endangered and critically endangered species also meet the quantitative criteria of vulnerable species, and are listed separately. See: List of endangered arthropods, List of critically endangered arthropods. Vulnerable, endangered and critically endangered species are collectively referred to as threatened species by the IUCN.

Additionally 2875 arthropod species (30% of those evaluated) are listed as data deficient, meaning there is insufficient information for a full assessment of conservation status. As these species typically have small distributions and/or populations, they are intrinsically likely to be threatened, according to the IUCN. While the category of data deficient indicates that no assessment of extinction risk has been made for the taxa, the IUCN notes that it may be appropriate to give them "the same degree of attention as threatened taxa, at least until their status can be assessed".

This is a complete list of vulnerable arthropod species and subspecies as evaluated by the IUCN.

== Seed shrimps ==
- Fabaeformiscandona aemonae
- Leucocythere helenae
- Limnocythere porphyretica
- Newnhamia fuscata
- Newnhamia insolita
- Pseudocandona cavicola
- Pseudocandona pretneri
- Pseudocandona trigonelia
- Zonocypretta kalimna

== Arachnids ==
There are 47 arachnid species assessed as vulnerable.

=== Spiders ===
- Andasta benoiti
- Argyrodella pusillus
- Argyrodes cognatus
- Argyrodes fissifrontellus
- Baviola braueri
- Baviola vanmoli
- Brignolia trichinalis
- Carrhotus bellus
- Cenemus culiculus
- Cousinea keeleyi
- Great raft spider (Dolomedes plantarius)
- Goleba pallens
- Grammostola vachoni
- Hasarius rufociliatus
- Mesida thorelli
- Dolloff cave spider (Meta dolloff)
- Nesiergus insulanus
- Ouette ouette
- Jean's jumping spider (Paraheliophanus jeanae)
- St Helenian jumping spider (Paraheliophanus sanctaehelenae)
- Under-equipped jumping spider (Paraheliophanus subinstructus)
- Glacier Bay wolf spider (Pardosa diuturna)
- Phycosoma spundana
- Mysore ornamental (Poecilotheria striata)
- Rhomphaea barycephala
- Roche roche
- Sadies fulgida
- Sadies seychellensis
- Silhouettella curieusei
- Soeuria soeur
- Lake Placid funnel wolf spider (Sosippus placidus)
- Stoda libudum
- Notable large burrowing spider (Thrigmopoeus insignis)
- Troglohyphantes gracilis
- Troglohyphantes similis
- Troglohyphantes spinipes
- Xerophaeus espoir

=== Other arachnid species ===
- Bamazomus aviculus
- Melones cave harvestman (Banksula melones)
- Beierolpium benoiti
- Seychelles small whip spider (Charinus seychellarum)
- Seychelles giant scorpion (Chiromachus ochropus)
- Empire cave pseudoscorpion (Fissilicreagris imperialis)
- Ibalonius flavopictus
- Nesowithius seychellesensis
- Indian Ocean whip spider (Phrynichus scaber)
- Xenolpium insulare

== Branchiopoda ==
- Alona hercegovinae
- Alona sketi
- Alona smirnovi
- Vernal pool fairy shrimp (Branchinecta lynchi)
- Branchinella apophysata
- Branchinella basispina
- Branchinella denticulata
- Branchinella simplex
- Branchinella wellardi
- Chirocephalus croaticus
- Chirocephalus pelagonicus
- Chirocephalus reiseri
- Daphnia coronata
- Daphnia jollyi
- Daphnia nivalis
- Daphnia occidentalis
- Eoleptestheria spinosa
- Imnadia banatica
- Imnadia cristata
- Imnadia panonica
- Parartemia contracta
- Rhynchochydorus australiensis

== Millipedes ==
- Solitary black millipede (Doratogonus avius)
- Bearded black millipede (Doratogonus barbatus)
- Herbert's black millipede (Doratogonus herberti)
- Hoffman's black millipede (Doratogonus hoffmani)
- Southern black millipede (Doratogonus meridionalis)
- Natal black millipede (Doratogonus natalensis)
- Precarious black millipede (Doratogonus precarius)
- Eutrichodesmus griseus
- Hyperothrix orophura
- Plusioglyphiulus boutini
- Pterozonium braueri
- Rhinotus crassiceps

== Maxillopoda ==
Maxillopoda includes barnacles, copepods and a number of related animals. There are 71 species in the class Maxillopoda assessed as vulnerable.

=== Calanoida ===
There are 47 species in the order Calanoida assessed as vulnerable.

==== Diaptomids ====
- Aglaodiaptomus kingsburyae
- Aglaodiaptomus marshianus
- Allodiaptomus satanas
- Arctodiaptomus burduricus
- Arctodiaptomus euacanthus
- Arctodiaptomus kamtschaticus
- Arctodiaptomus michaeli
- Dussartius baeticus
- Eodiaptomus lumholtzi
- Eodiaptomus shihi
- Heliodiaptomus kolleruensis
- Heliodiaptomus pulcher
- Hesperodiaptomus augustaensis
- Hesperodiaptomus californiensis
- Lovenula excellens
- Lovenula simplex
- Mastigodiaptomus purpureus
- Metadiaptomus capensis
- Metadiaptomus purcelli
- Neodiaptomus intermedius
- Neodiaptomus laii
- Neodiaptomus lymphatus
- Neodiaptomus physalipus
- Notodiaptomus dubius
- Notodiaptomus maracaibensis
- Paradiaptomus natalensis
- Phyllodiaptomus wellekensae
- Skistodiaptomus carolinensis
- Stygodiaptomus kieferi
- Stygodiaptomus petkovskii
- Thermodiaptomus galeboides
- Tropodiaptomus burundensis
- Tropodiaptomus kilimensis
- Tropodiaptomus kissi
- Tropodiaptomus neumanni
- Tropodiaptomus simplex
- Tropodiaptomus stuhlmanni

==== Centropagids ====
- Boeckella bispinosa
- Boeckella calcaris
- Boeckella geniculata
- Boeckella nyoraensis
- Boeckella shieli
- Calamoecia australica
- Calamoecia elongata
- Calamoecia zeidleri
- Hemiboeckella powellensis

==== Temorids ====
- Epischura baikalensis

=== Cyclopoida ===
- Acanthocyclops hypogeus
- Mesocyclops insulensis
- Metacyclops gasparoi
- Metacyclops postojnae
- Tropocyclops federensis
- Tropocyclops nananae

=== Harpacticoida ===
There are 18 species in the order Harpacticoida assessed as vulnerable.

==== Darcythompsoniids ====
- Leptocaris stromatolicolus

==== Ameirids ====
- Nitocrella slovenica
- Nitocrella stochi

==== Canthocamptids ====
- Canthocamptus dedeckkeri
- Canthocamptus echinopyge
- Canthocamptus longipes
- Canthocamptus mammillifurca
- Canthocamptus sublaevis
- Canthocamptus tasmaniae
- Ceuthonectes rouchi
- Elaphoidella amabilis
- Elaphoidella franci
- Elaphoidella jeanneli
- Elaphoidella kieferi
- Fibulacamptus bisetosus
- Fibulacamptus gracilior
- Paramorariopsis anae
- Pseudomoraria triglavensis

== Malacostracans ==
Malacostraca includes crabs, lobsters, crayfish, shrimp, krill, woodlice, and many others. There are 307 malacostracan species and 14 malacostracan subspecies assessed as vulnerable.

=== Isopods ===
Species

- Madison cave isopod (Antrolana lira)
- Arubolana imula
- Bat cave isopod (Caecidotea macropoda)
- Nickajack cave isopod (Caecidotea nickajackensis)
- Calconiscellus gottscheensis
- Haplophthalmus abbreviatus
- Haplophthalmus rhinoceros
- Rye Cove cave isopod (Lirceus culveri)
- Metatrichoniscoides celticus
- Mexilana saluposi
- Mexistenasellus nulemex
- Parzefall's stenasellid (Mexistenasellus parzefalli)
- Wilken's stenasellid (Mexistenasellus wilkensi)
- Monolistra calopyge
- Monolistra schottlaenderi
- Moserius percoi
- Onchotelson brevicaudatus
- Onchotelson spatulatus
- Proasellus parvulus
- Proasellus slovenicus
- Sphaerolana karenae
- Sumatrillo sp. nov. 'HC - blind'
- Uramphisopus pearsoni

Subspecies

- Androniscus stygius dentatus
- Asellus aquaticus cavernicolus
- Proasellus pavani orientalis

=== Amphipods ===
There are 56 amphipod species and four amphipod subspecies assessed as vulnerable.

==== Hadziids ====
Subspecies

- Hadzia fragilis stochi

==== Paramelitids ====
- Paramelita flexa

==== Gammarids ====
- Bousfield's amphipod (Gammarus bousfieldi)
- Diminutive amphipod (Gammarus hyalelloides)
- Pecos amphipod (Gammarus pecos)

==== Crangonyctids ====
- Central Missouri cave amphipod (Allocrangonyx hubrichti)
- Oklahoma cave amphipod (Allocrangonyx pellucidus)
- Florida cave amphipod (Crangonyx grandimanus)
- Hobb's cave amphipod (Crangonyx hobbsi)
- Tidewater interstitial amphipod (Stygobromus araeus)
- Arizona cave amphipod (Stygobromus arizonensis)
- Balcones cave amphipod (Stygobromus balconis)
- Barr's cave amphipod (Stygobromus barri)
- Bifurcated cave amphipod (Stygobromus bifurcatus)
- Bowman's cave amphipod (Stygobromus bowmani)
- Clanton's cave amphipod (Stygobromus clantoni)
- Burnsville Cove cave amphipod (Stygobromus conradi)
- Cooper's cave amphipod (Stygobromus cooperi)
- Cascade cave amphipod (Stygobromus dejectus)
- Elevated spring amphipod (Stygobromus elatus)
- Greenbrier cave amphipod (Stygobromus emarginatus)
- Ephemeral cave amphipod (Stygobromus ephemerus)
- Ezell's cave amphipod (Stygobromus flagellatus)
- Grady's cave amphipod (Stygobromus gradyi)
- Devil's sinkhole amphipod (Stygobromus hadenoecus)
- Hara's cave amphipod (Stygobromus harai)
- Pickle springs amphipod (Stygobromus heteropodus)
- Malheur cave amphipod (Stygobromus hubbsi)
- Tidewater stygonectid amphipod (Stygobromus identatus)
- Long-legged cave amphipod (Stygobromus longipes)
- Mackenzie's cave amphipod (Stygobromus mackenziei)
- Mountain cave amphipod (Stygobromus montanus)
- Morrison's cave amphipod (Stygobromus morrisoni)
- Bath County cave amphipod (Stygobromus mundus)
- Norton's cave amphipod (Stygobromus nortoni)
- Onondaga cave amphipod (Stygobromus onondagaensis)
- Ozark cave amphipod (Stygobromus ozarkensis)
- Minute cave amphipod (Stygobromus parvus)
- Pizzini's amphipod (Stygobromus pizzinii)
- Wisconsin well amphipod (Stygobromus putealis)
- Reddell's cave amphipod (Stygobromus reddelli)
- Alabama well amphipod (Stygobromus smithii)
- Spring cave amphipod (Stygobromus spinatus)
- Stellmack's cave amphipod (Stygobromus stellmacki)
- Subtle cave amphipod (Stygobromus subtilis)
- Wengeror's cave amphipod (Stygobromus wengerorum)

==== Niphargids ====
Species

- Carinurella paradoxa
- Niphargobates lefkodemonaki
- Niphargobates orophobata
- Niphargus aberrans
- Niphargus hadzii
- Niphargus hrabei
- Niphargus sphagnicolus
- Niphargus spoeckeri
- Niphargus stenopus
- Niphargus timavi
- Niphargus valachicus

Subspecies

- Niphargus ilidzensis slovenicus
- Niphargus orcinus orcinus
- Niphargus stygius stygius

=== Anaspidacea ===
- Allanaspides helonomus
- Hickman's pygmy mountain shrimp (Allanaspides hickmani)
- Eucrenonaspides oinotheke
- Great Lake shrimp (Paranaspides lacustris)

=== Decapods ===
There are 224 decapod species and seven decapod subspecies assessed as vulnerable.

==== Parastacids ====
- Astacoides betsileoensis
- Astacoides caldwelli
- Common yabby (Cherax destructor)
- Cherax papuanus
- Strzelecki burrowing crayfish (Engaeus rostrogaleatus)
- Dandenong burrowing crayfish (Engaeus urostrictus)
- Burnie burrowing crayfish (Engaeus yabbimunna)
- Glenelg river crayfish (Euastacus bispinosus)
- Euastacus simplex
- Lamington crayfish (Euastacus sulcatus)
- New England crayfish (Euastacus suttoni)
- Euastacus yarreansis
- Geocharax falcata
- Ombrastacoides pulcher

==== Gecarcinucids ====
- Adeleana forcarti
- Arachnothelphusa melanippe
- Austrothelphusa tigrina
- Austrothelphusa valentula
- Heterothelphusa fatum
- Johnson's freshwater crab (Irmengardia johnsoni)
- Liotelphusa quadrata
- Mainitia mainitensis
- Mekhongthelphusa kengsaphu
- Mekhongthelphusa tetragona
- Nautilothelphusa zimmeri
- Oziotelphusa biloba
- Oziotelphusa hippocastanum
- Oziotelphusa ritigala
- Oziotelphusa stricta
- Oziotelphusa wagrakarowensis
- Parathelphusa balabac
- Parathelphusa cabayugan
- Parathelphusa crocea
- Parathelphusa maindroni
- Parathelphusa ovum
- Parathelphusa pantherina
- Parathelphusa possoensis
- Perbrinckia fenestra
- Perbrinckia integra
- Phricotelphusa callianira
- Phricotelphusa elegans
- Phricotelphusa limula
- Phricotelphusa ranongi
- Sayamia maehongsonensis
- Stygothelphusa bidiensis
- Sundathelphusa minahassae
- Sundathelphusa rubra

==== Atyids ====
- Archaetya chacei
- Atya ortmannioides
- Atyaephyra strymonensis
- Caridina ablepsia
- Caridina acuta
- Caridina acutirostris
- Caridina anislaq
- Caridina batuan
- Caridina boholensis
- Caridina breviata
- Caridina bunyonyiensis
- Caridina caerulea
- Caridina camaro
- Caridina caverna
- Caridina cavernicola
- Caridina demenica
- Caridina dianchiensis
- Caridina ensifera
- Caridina feixiana
- Caridina gordonae
- Caridina gortio
- Caridina guangxiensis
- Caridina leclerci
- Sulawesi fan shrimp (Caridina longidigita)
- Caridina mengae
- Caridina minidentata
- Caridina pseudodenticulata
- Caridina pseudonilotica
- Caridina samar
- Caridina sarasinorum
- Caridina schenkeli
- Caridina semiblepsia
- Caridina sodenensis
- Caridina spelunca
- Caridina trifasciata
- Caridina valencia
- Edoneus erwini
- Edoneus marulas
- Edoneus sketi
- Marosina brevirostris
- Marosina longirostris
- Neocaridina brevidactyla
- Kentucky cave shrimp (Palaemonias ganteri)
- Paracaridina longispina
- Parisia deharvengi
- Parisia macrophora
- Stygiocaris lancifera
- Stygiocaris stylifera
- Troglocaris bosnica
- Troglocaris kapelana
- Troglocaris neglecta
- Troglocaris prasence
- Typhlatya consobrina
- Typhlatya elenae
- Typhlatya garciadebrasi
- Typhlatya garciai
- Typhlatya miravetensis
- Typhlatya taina
- Typhlocaridina lanceifrons
- Typhlocaridina liui
- Typhlocaridina semityphlata

==== Cambarids ====
Species

- Short mountain crayfish (Cambarus clivosus)
- Grandfather mountain crayfish (Cambarus eeseeohensis)
- Elk river crayfish (Cambarus elkensis)
- Alabama cave crayfish (Cambarus jonesi)
- Saluda burrowing crayfish (Distocambarus hunteri)
- Newberry burrowing crayfish (Distocambarus youngineri)
- Daisy burrowing crayfish (Fallicambarus jeanae)
- Crittenden crayfish (Orconectes bisectus)
- Coldwater crayfish (Orconectes eupunctus)
- Yazoo crayfish (Orconectes hartfieldi)
- Tennessee cave crayfish (Orconectes incomptus)
- Big creek crayfish (Orconectes peruncus)
- St. Francis river crayfish (Orconectes quadruncus)
- Kiamichi crayfish (Orconectes saxatilis)
- Crescent crayfish (Orconectes taylori)
- Hardin crayfish (Orconectes wrighti)
- Gabriel cave crayfish (Procambarus cavernicola)
- Procambarus citlaltepetl
- Procambarus ruthveni

Subspecies

- Calcasieu crayfish (Orconectes hathawayi blacki)
- Orconectes inermis testii
- Orconectes meeki brevis
- Procambarus lucifugus alachua
- Procambarus rogersi campestris
- Procambarus rogersi ochlocknensis
- Procambarus rogersi rogersi

==== Potamonautids ====
- Boreas uglowi
- Nimba stream crab (Liberonautes nimba)
- Potamonautes gerdalensis
- Potamonautes ignestii
- Potamonautes infravallatus
- Blue river crab (Potamonautes lividus)
- Potamonautes montivagus
- Potamonautes pilosus
- East African tree hole crab (Potamonautes raybouldi)
- Reid's river crab (Potamonautes reidi)
- Potamonautes triangulus
- Potamonautes unisulcatus
- Potamonautes xiphoidus
- Sachs's stream crab (Potamonemus sachsi)

==== Pseudothelphusids ====
- Allacanthos pittieri
- Chaceus ibiricensis
- Elsalvadoria zurstrasseni
- Epilobocera haytensis
- Epilobocera wetherbeei
- Fredius granulatus
- Hypolobocera alata
- Hypolobocera andagoensis
- Hypolobocera barbacensis
- Hypolobocera cajambrensis
- Hypolobocera gracilignatha
- Hypolobocera rathbuni
- Hypolobocera rotundilobata
- Hypolobocera velezi
- Lindacatalina sumacensis
- Microthelphusa forcarti
- Moritschus altaquerensis
- Moritschus ecuadorensis
- Neopseudothelphusa fossor
- Phrygiopilus acanthophallus
- Potamocarcinus hartmanni
- Potamocarcinus roatensis
- Ptychophallus tristani
- Raddaus mertensi
- Rodriguezus trujillensis

==== Potamids ====
- Cryptopotamon anacoluthon
- Geothelphusa miyakoensis
- South Australia crab (Geothelphusa nanao)
- Pingtung crab (Geothelphusa pingtung)
- Ze concept of crab (Geothelphusa takuan)
- Taroko crab (Geothelphusa taroko)
- Wang's crab (Geothelphusa wangi)
- Wutai crab (Geothelphusa wutai)
- Indochinamon cua
- Indochinamon dangi
- Indochinamon guttum
- Indochinamon mieni
- Iomon luangprabangense
- Isolapotamon bauense
- Johora counsilmani
- Johora gapensis
- Johora johorensis
- Johora thoi
- Malayopotamon granulatum
- Taiwan's South China sea river crab (Nanhaipotamon formosanum)
- Nemoron nomas
- Parapotamon spinescens
- Potamon bileki
- Pupamon phrae
- Sinopotamon ebianense
- Sinopotamon hanyangense
- Stelomon erawanense
- Stelomon kanchanaburiense
- Stoliczia bella
- Stoliczia changmanae
- Stoliczia cognata
- Stoliczia goal
- Stoliczia karenae
- Stoliczia kedahensis
- Stoliczia leoi
- Stoliczia pahangensis
- Stoliczia panhai
- Stoliczia perlensis
- Stoliczia tweedei
- Tiwaripotamon edostilus

==== Palaemonids ====
- Leptopalaemon gibbosus
- Leptopalaemon gudjangah
- Leptopalaemon magelensis
- Macrobrachium acanthochirus
- Macrobrachium acherontium
- Macrobrachium elegantum
- Macrobrachium gurudeve
- Macrobrachium lingyunense
- Macrobrachium tuxtlaense
- Troglocubanus calcis
- Troglocubanus gibarensis
- Troglocubanus inermis

==== Trichodactylids ====
- Avotrichodactylus oaxensis
- Bottiella cucutensis
- Bottiella medemi

==== Other decapod species ====
- Noble crayfish (Astacus astacus)
- Coconut crab (Birgus latro)
- Common spiny lobster (Palinurus elephas)
- Typhlocaris salentina

== Insects ==
There are 608 insect species and 15 insect subspecies assessed as vulnerable.

=== Flies ===
- Belkin's dune tabanid fly (Brennania belkini)
- Tasmanian torrent midge (Edwardsina tasmaniensis)
- Beautiful-winged fruit fly (Scaptomyza horaeoptera)

=== Plecoptera ===
- Otway stonefly (Eusthenia nothofagi)
- Mount Kosciusko wingless stonefly (Leptoperla cacuminis)

=== Notoptera ===
- Mount St Helens' grylloblattid (Grylloblatta chirurgica)

=== Orthoptera ===
There are 137 species in the order Orthoptera assessed as vulnerable.

==== Crickets ====
- Howarth's cave cricket (Caconemobius howarthi)
- Schauinsland's bush cricket (Caconemobius schauinslandi)
- Kaumana cave cricket (Caconemobius varius)
- Lanzarote malpais cricket (Hymenoptila lanzarotensis)
- Metioche luteolus
- Karpathos glandular cricket (Ovaliptila kinzelbachi)
- Dodecanese glandular cricket (Ovaliptila nana)
- Phalangacris phaloricephala
- Volcanoes cave cricket (Thaumatogryllus cavicola)
- Kauai thin-footed bush cricket (Thaumatogryllus variegatus)

==== Acridids ====
- Usambara slant-faced grasshopper (Acrida bara)
- Uvarov's bird grasshopper (Acridoderes uvarovi)
- Idaho point-headed grasshopper (Acrolophitus pulchellus)
- Usambara burrowing grasshopper (Acrotylus apicalis)
- Usambara forest edge grasshopper (Afrophlaeoba usambarica)
- Michigan bog grasshopper (Appalachia arcana)
- Wembere grasshopper (Aulacobothrus popovi)
- Tanzanian miombo grasshopper (Cardeniopsis regalis)
- Siskiyou Chloealtis grasshopper (Chloealtis aspasma)
- White-tipped grasshopper (Chorthippus acroleucus)
- Ufipa blue-winged grasshopper (Chromochokwea fitzgeraldi)
- Calabrian gold grasshopper (Chrysochraon beybienkoi)
- Banat grasshopper (Eozubovskya banatica)
- Udzungwa noble grasshopper (Eupropacris uniformis)
- Eximacris superbum
- Three-spotted forest grasshopper (Heteracris trimaculata)
- Reatine Italian grasshopper (Italohippus modestus)
- Kilimanjaro drumming grasshopper (Ixalidium sjostedti)
- Usambara drumming grasshopper (Ixalidium transiens)
- Long-winged mountain grasshopper (Miramella irena)
- Romanian mountain grasshopper (Odontopodisma montana)
- Red-legged mountain grasshopper (Odontopodisma rubripes)
- Erimanthos mountain grasshopper (Oropodisma erymanthosi)
- Kyllini mountain grasshopper (Oropodisma kyllinii)
- Macedonian mountain grasshopper (Oropodisma macedonica)
- Tayetos mountain grasshopper (Oropodisma taygetosi)
- Turkish black sea coast grasshopper (Rammeihippus turcicus)
- Almeria sand grasshopper (Sphingonotus almeriense)
- Tenerife sand grasshopper (Sphingonotus picteti)
- Rugose sand grasshopper (Sphingonotus rugosus)
- Eurasian toothed grasshopper (Stenobothrus eurasius)

==== Stenopelmatids ====
- Kelso Jerusalem cricket (Ammopelmatus kelsoensis)
- Port Conception Jerusalem cricket (Ammopelmatus muwu)
- Poor knights weta (Deinacrida fallai)
- Wetapunga (Deinacrida heteracantha)
- Stephens Island weta (Deinacrida rugosa)
- Coachella Valley Jerusalem cricket (Stenopelmatus cahuilaensis)
- Navajo Jerusalem cricket (Stenopelmatus navajo)

==== Tettigoniids ====
- Richtersveld katydid (Africariola longicauda)
- Marakele delicate katydid (Amyttacta marakelensis)
- Short-winged tonged bush-cricket (Anadrymadusa brevipennis)
- Dilated false shieldback (Aroegas dilatatus)
- Flat-necked shieldback (Arytropteris basalis)
- Austrosaga spinifer
- Sierra Nevadan saddle bush-cricket (Baetica ustulata)
- Nihoa conehead katydid (Banza nihoa)
- Big pine key conehead katydid (Belocephalus micanopy)
- Keys short-winged conehead katydid (Belocephalus sleighti)
- Tenerife green bush-cricket (Calliphona koenigi)
- Canarian laurel bush-cricket (Canariola nubigena)
- Lalande's black-winged clonia (Clonia lalandei)
- Uvarov's clonia (Clonia uvarovi)
- Peringuey's meadow katydid (Conocephalus peringueyi)
- Zlobin's meadow katydid (Conocephalus zlobini)
- Remote conehead katydid (Euconocephalus remotus)
- Annamaria's marbled bush-cricket (Eupholidoptera annamariae)
- Cretan marbled bush-cricket (Eupholidoptera cretica)
- Idi marbled bush-cricket (Eupholidoptera forcipata)
- Skaronero marbled bush-cricket (Eupholidoptera gemellata)
- Giulia's marbled bush-cricket (Eupholidoptera giuliae)
- Ikaria marbled bush-cricket (Eupholidoptera icariensis)
- Jacqueline's marbled bush-cricket (Eupholidoptera jacquelinae)
- Hidden marbled bush-cricket (Eupholidoptera latens)
- Lefkas marbled bush-cricket (Eupholidoptera leucasi)
- Marianne's marbled bush-cricket (Eupholidoptera mariannae)
- Pale-legged marbled bush-cricket (Eupholidoptera pallipes)
- Hemisaga lucifer
- Hemisaga vepreculae
- Metrioptera domogledi
- Southern barbed-wire bush-cricket (Onconotus servillei)
- Pachysaga munggai
- Drakensberg grass false shieldback (Paracilacris lateralis)
- Golden Gate grass false shieldback (Paracilacris mordax)
- Vardousia Greek bush-cricket (Parnassiana coracis)
- Dirphys Greek bush-cricket (Parnassiana dirphys)
- Tawny Greek bush-cricket (Parnassiana fusca)
- Parnon Greek bush-cricket (Parnassiana parnon)
- Slim Greek bush-cricket (Parnassiana tenuis)
- Phasmodes jeeba
- Psacadonotus seriatus
- Gavrogo bush-cricket (Rhacocleis crypta)
- Cretan bush-cricket (Rhacocleis derrai)
- Lesbos bush-cricket (Rhacocleis distinguenda)
- Ferdinand's bush-cricket (Rhacocleis ferdinandi)
- Stone-jumping bush-cricket (Rhacocleis lithoscirtetes)
- Common predatory bush-cricket (Saga pedo)
- Golden Gate seedpod shieldback (Thoracistus aureoportalis)
- Green-kneed seedpod shieldback (Thoracistus viridicrus)
- Windbalea viride
- Zaprochilus ninae

==== Rhaphidophorids ====
- Arizona giant sand treader cricket (Daihinibaenetes arizonensis)
- Kalymnos cave-cricket (Dolichopoda calidnae)
- Cassagnau's cave-cricket (Dolichopoda cassagnaui)
- Kefalari cave-cricket (Dolichopoda dalensi)
- Lefkas cave-cricket (Dolichopoda gasparoi)
- Giuliana's cave-cricket (Dolichopoda giulianae)
- Perama cave-cricket (Dolichopoda graeca)
- Ithaka cave-cricket (Dolichopoda ithakii)
- Kalithea cave-cricket (Dolichopoda kalithea)
- Matsakis' cave-cricket (Dolichopoda matsakisi)
- Naxos cave-cricket (Dolichopoda naxia)
- Cephalonia cave-cricket (Dolichopoda pavesii)
- Pan cave-cricket (Dolichopoda petrochilosi)
- Thassos cave-cricket (Dolichopoda thasosensis)
- Kelso giant sand treader cricket (Macrobaenetes kelsoensis)
- Coachelia giant sand treader cricket (Macrobaenetes valgum)
- Pristoceuthophilus sp. nov.
- Tasmanoplectron isolatum
- Tanner's black camel cricket (Utabaenetes tanneri)

==== Phaneropterids ====
- Mute winter katydid (Brinckiella aptera)
- Karoo winter katydid (Brinckiella karooensis)
- Mauerberger's winter katydid (Brinckiella mauerbergerorum)
- Cozia plump bush-cricket (Isophya harzi)
- Long-tailed plump bush-cricket (Isophya longicaudata)
- Athos bright bush-cricket (Poecilimon athos)
- Ikaria bright bush-cricket (Poecilimon ikariensis)
- Istanbul bright bush-cricket (Poecilimon istanbul)
- Kadiytsa bright bush-cricket (Poecilimon pechevi)
- Short-tailed bull bush-cricket (Polysarcus scutatus)
- East coast katydid (Pomatonota dregii)

==== Other Orthoptera species ====
- Canarian tiny cricket (Cycloptiloides canariensis)
- Keys scaly cricket (Cycloptilum irregularis)
- Pinaleno monkey grasshopper (Eumorsea pinaleno)
- Cretan stone grasshopper (Orchamus raulinii)
- Desert monkey grasshopper (Psychomastax deserticola)
- Sierra pygmy grasshopper (Tetrix sierrana)
- Uvarovitettix transsylvanicus

=== Hymenoptera ===
There are 155 species in the order Hymenoptera assessed as vulnerable.

==== Ants ====
- Acanthomyops latipes
- Acanthomyops murphii
- Anergates atratulus
- Anoplolepis nuptialis
- Antichthonidris bidentatus
- Camponotus universitatis
- Cardiocondyla zoserka
- Cataglyphis hannae
- Chalepoxenus brunneus
- Chalepoxenus kutteri
- Chalepoxenus muellerianus
- Chalepoxenus spinosus
- Chalepoxenus tarbinskii
- Chalepoxenus tauricus
- Chalepoxenus tramieri
- Chalepoxenus zabelini
- Crematogaster atilanica
- Crematogaster pilosa
- Doronomyrmex goesswaldi
- Doronomyrmex kutteri
- Doronomyrmex pacis
- Doronomyrmex pocahontas
- Dorymyrmex insanus
- Epimyrma adlerzi
- Epimyrma africana
- Epimyrma algeriana
- Epimyrma bernardi
- Epimyrma corsica
- Epimyrma goridaghini
- Epimyrma kraussei
- Ravoux's slavemaker ant (Epimyrma ravouxi)
- Epimyrma stumperi
- Epimyrma tamarae
- Epimyrma zaleskyi
- Formica dirksi
- Formica talbotae
- Formicoxenus chamberlini
- Formicoxenus nitidulus
- Formicoxenus provancheri
- Formicoxenus quebecensis
- Formicoxenus sibiricus
- Harpagoxenus canadensis
- Harpagoxenus sublaevis
- Harpagoxenus zaisanicus
- Kyidris media
- Kyidris yaleogyna
- Lasius reginae
- Leptothorax buschingeri
- Leptothorax duloticus
- Leptothorax faberi
- Leptothorax minutissimus
- Manica parasitica
- Megalomyrmex symmetochus
- Monomorium effractor
- Monomorium hospitum
- Monomorium inquilinum
- Monomorium noualhieri
- Monomorium pergandei
- Monomorium santschii
- Monomorium talbotae
- Myrmecia inquilina
- Myrmica bibikoffi
- Myrmica colax
- Myrmica ereptrix
- Myrmica faniensis
- Myrmica hirsuta
- Myrmica kabylica
- Myrmica lampra
- Myrmica laurae
- Myrmica lemasnei
- Myrmica myrmicoxena
- Myrmica quebecensis
- Myrmica samnitica
- Myrmica symbiotica
- Myrmica winterae
- Myrmoxenus gordiagini
- Oxyepoecus bruchi
- Oxyepoecus daguerrei
- Oxyepoecus inquilinus
- Pheidole acutidens
- Pheidole argentina
- Pheidole elecebra
- Pheidole inquilina
- Pheidole lanuginosa
- Pheidole microgyna
- Pheidole neokohli
- Pheidole oculata
- Pheidole parasitica
- Pheidole symbiotica
- Plagiolepis ampeloni
- Plagiolepis grassei
- Plagiolepis regis
- Pogonomyrmex anergismus
- Pogonomyrmex colei
- Polyergus breviceps
- Polyergus lucidus
- Polyergus nigerrimus
- Polyergus samurai
- Protomognathus americanus
- Pseudoatta argentina
- Pseudomyrmex leptosus
- Rhoptromyrmex mayri
- Rhoptromyrmex schmitzi
- Rossomyrmex minuchae
- Rossomyrmex proformicarum
- Serrastruma inquilina
- Solenopsis daguerrei
- Solenopsis solenopsidis
- Strongylognathus afer
- Strongylognathus alboini
- Strongylognathus alpinus
- Strongylognathus arnoldii
- Strongylognathus caeciliae
- Strongylognathus cecconii
- Strongylognathus chelifer
- Strongylognathus christophi
- Strongylognathus dalmaticus
- Strongylognathus destefanii
- Strongylognathus emeryi
- Strongylognathus foreli
- Strongylognathus huberi
- Strongylognathus insularis
- Strongylognathus italicus
- Strongylognathus karawajewi (Strongylognathus karawajevi)
- Strongylognathus kervillei
- Strongylognathus koreanus
- Strongylognathus kratochvili (Strongylognathus kratochvilli)
- Strongylognathus minutus
- Strongylognathus palaestinensis
- Strongylognathus pisarskii
- Strongylognathus rehbinderi
- Strongylognathus ruzskyi
- Strongylognathus silvestrii
- Strumigenys xenos
- Teleutomyrmex kutteri
- Teleutomyrmex schneideri
- Tetramorium microgyna
- Tetramorium parasiticum

==== Colletids ====
- Colletes dimidiatus
- Colletes moricei
- Colletes pulchellus

==== Melittids ====
- Melitta hispanica
- Melitta kastiliensis

==== Apids ====
- Bombus alpinus
- Obscure bumble bee (Bombus caliginosus)
- Yellow bumblebee (Bombus fervidus)
- Bombus medius
- Bombus mexicanus
- Morrison bumble bee (Bombus morrisoni)
- Western bumblebee (Bombus occidentalis)
- American bumblebee (Bombus pensylvanicus)
- Yellow-banded bumblebee (Bombus terricola)
- Nomada noskiewiczi

==== Megachilids ====
- Wallace's giant bee (Megachile pluto)

=== Mantises ===
- Delicate dwarf mantis (Ameles gracilis)
- Fringed dwarf mantis (Ameles limbata)
- Short-winged dwarf mantis (Pseudoyersinia subaptera)

=== Lepidoptera ===
Lepidoptera comprises moths and butterflies. There are 128 species and ten subspecies in the order Lepidoptera assessed as vulnerable.

==== Lasiocampids ====
- Small lappet moth (Phyllodesma ilicifolia)

==== Swallowtail butterflies ====
- Atrophaneura atropos
- Atrophaneura luchti
- Atrophaneura schadenbergi
- Zetides swallowtail (Battus zetides)
- Ludlow's Bhutan swallowtail (Bhutanitis ludlowi)
- Yellow kite swallowtail (Eurytides iphitas)
- Andamans swordtail (Graphium epaminondas)
- Graphium idaeoides
- Meek's graphium (Graphium meeki)
- Graphium megaera
- Graphium procles
- Graphium stresemanni
- Obi Island birdwing (Ornithoptera aesacus)
- Rothschild's birdwing (Ornithoptera rothschildi)
- Papilio carolinensis
- Papilio esperanza
- Jordan's swallowtail (Papilio jordani)
- Cream-banded swallowtail (Papilio leucotaenia)
- Papilio mangoura
- Papilio neumoegeni
- Papilio osmana
- Papillon la pature (Papilio phorbanta)
- Fluminense swallowtail (Parides ascanius)
- Apollo (Parnassius apollo)
- Parnassius autocrator
- Jamaican kite (Protographium marcellinus)
- Talaud black birdwing (Troides dohertyi)
- Buru opalescent birdwing (Troides prattorum)
- Caucasian festoon (Zerynthia caucasica)

==== Lycaenids ====
- Alaena margaritacea
- Aloeides caledoni
- Aloeides carolynnae
- Aloeides dentatis
- Aloeides kaplani
- Aloeides lutescens
- Aloeides merces
- Aloeides pringlei
- Aloeides rossouwi
- Aslauga australis
- Capys penningtoni
- Cyanophrys bertha
- Erikssonia acraeina
- White spotted sapphire (Iolaus lulua)
- Lepidochrysops balli
- Lepidochrysops jefferyi
- Lepidochrysops littoralis
- Lepidochrysops loewensteini
- Lepidochrysops oosthuizeni
- Lepidochrysops outeniqua
- Lepidochrysops pephredo
- Lepidochrysops poseidon
- Lepidochrysops pringlei
- Lepidochrysops swanepoeli
- Lepidochrysops titei
- Lepidochrysops victori
- Lepidochrysops wykehami
- Tiassale liptena (Liptena tiassale)
- Hermes copper (Lycaena hermes)
- Grecian copper (Lycaena ottomana)
- Orachrysops ariadne
- Phasis pringlei
- Poecilmitis adonis
- Azure opal (Poecilmitis azurius)
- Poecilmitis balli
- Poecilmitis daphne
- Poecilmitis endymion
- Poecilmitis henningi
- Poecilmitis hyperion
- Poecilmitis irene
- Poecilmitis kaplani
- Tsomo River copper (Poecilmitis lyncurium)
- Poecilmitis lyndseyae
- Poecilmitis orientalis
- Poecilmitis penningtoni
- Poecilmitis pyramus
- Poecilmitis stepheni
- Poecilmitis trimeni
- Poecilmitis wykehami
- Higgin's anomalous blue (Polyommatus galloi)
- Sierra Nevada blue (Polyommatus golgus)
- Ipharcamon blue (Polyommatus iphicarmon)
- Lycian blue (Polyommatus lycius)
- Polyommatus orphicus
- Sinai hairstreak (Satyrium jebelia)
- Avalon hairstreak (Strymon avalona)
- Thestor compassbergae
- Thestor dryburghi
- Kaplan's thestor (Thestor kaplani)
- Thestor pringlei
- Thestor rossouwi
- Thestor stepheni
- Thestor strutti
- Thestor swanepoeli
- Thestor tempe
- Thestor yildizae

==== Nymphalids ====
Species

- Madagascan friar (Amauris nossima)
- Mauritian friar (Amauris phoedon)
- Uncompahgre fritillary (Boloria acrocnema)
- Balkan heath (Coenonympha orientalis)
- Raetzer's ringlet (Erebia christi)
- Sudeten ringlet (Erebia sudetica)
- Andaman crow (Euploea andamanensis)
- Cordelia's crow (Euploea cordelia)
- Mascarene crow (Euploea euphon)
- Spartan crow (Euploea lacon)
- Magou (Euploea magou)
- Nicobar crow (Euploea scherzeri)
- El Hierro grayling (Hipparchia bacchus)
- La Palma grayling (Hipparchia tilosi)
- Electra's tree-nymph (Idea electra)
- Bedford-Russell's tree-nymph (Idea tambusisiana)
- Ideopsis oberthurii
- New Ireland yellow tiger (Parantica clinias)
- D'Abrera's tiger (Parantica dabrerai)
- Dannatt's tiger (Parantica dannatti)
- Angled tiger (Parantica garamantis)
- Sumbawa tiger (Parantica philo)
- Felder's tiger (Parantica phyle)
- Toxopeus' yellow tiger (Parantica toxopei)
- Flores tiger (Parantica wegneri)
- Dils' grayling (Pseudochazara orestes)
- Crow tiger (Tirumala euploeomorpha)

Subspecies

- Danaus affinis jimiensis
- Danaus melanippus keteus
- Outcast crow (Euploea algea abjecta)
- Euploea algea eleutho
- Euploea algea schmeltzi
- Euploea crameri albomaculata
- Euploea mulciber elwesii
- Euploea radamanthus schreiberi
- Parantica weiskei thalassina
- Sarangani tiger (Tirumala choaspes tumanana)

==== Skippers ====
- Dakota skipper (Hesperia dacotae)
- Cinquefoil skipper (Pyrgus cirsii)

==== Pierids ====
- Canary brimstone (Gonepteryx cleobule)
- Atewa dotted border (Mylothris atewa)
- Moroccan green-veined white (Pieris segonzaci)

=== Beetles ===
There are 50 beetle species assessed as vulnerable.

==== Dytiscids ====
- Acilius duvergeri
- Deronectes depressicollis
- Deronectes ferrugineus
- Dytiscus latissimus
- Graphoderus bilineatus
- Meladema lanio

==== Longhorn beetles ====
- Cerambyx longicorn (Cerambyx cerdo)
- Clytus clavicornis
- Clytus triangulimacula
- Delagrangeus schurmanni
- Isotomus barbarae
- Macrodontia cervicornis
- Morimus funereus
- Rosalia longicorn (Rosalia alpina)

==== Scarabaeids ====
- Ciervo scarab beetle (Aegialia concinna)
- Crescent dune scarab beetle (Aegialia crescenta)
- Ateuchetus semipunctatus
- Ateuchus squalidus
- Aulacopris matthewsi
- Canthon corpulentus
- Canthon quadripunctatus
- Clypeodrepanus striatus
- Ontherus hadros
- Onthophagus albarracinus
- Pachysoma aesculapius
- Pachysoma endroedyi
- Pachysoma glentoni
- Pedaridium hirsutum
- Platyonitis bicuariensis
- Giuliani's dune scarab beetle (Pseudocotalpa giulianii)

==== Other beetle species ====
- Ampedus brunnicornis
- Ampedus hjorti
- Anonyxmolytes lilliput
- Carabus olympiae
- Cobblestone tiger beetle (Cicindela marginipennis)
- Globose dune beetle (Coelus globosus)
- San Joaquin dune beetle (Coelus gracilis)
- Colophon cameroni
- Colophon neli
- Colophon stokoei
- Colophon westwoodi
- Blind cave beetle (Glacicavicola bathysciodes)
- Gnorimus decempunctatus
- Leipaspis lauricola
- Melasis fermini
- Microblattellus lecongmani
- Frigate Island giant tenebrionid beetle (Polposipus herculeanus)
- Gammon's riffle beetle (Stenelmis gammoni)
- Thorectes valencianus
- Triplax emgei

=== Odonata ===
Odonata includes dragonflies and damselflies. There are 129 species and five subspecies in the order Odonata assessed as vulnerable.

==== Chlorogomphids ====
- Chlorogomphus brevistigma
- Chlorogomphus gracilis
- Chlorogomphus nakamurai
- Chlorogomphus xanthoptera
- Chloropetalia selysi
- Watanabeopetalia uenoi

==== Chlorocyphids ====
- Banded jewel (Africocypha centripunctata)
- Kaleidoscope jewel (Africocypha lacuselephantum)
- Albertine jewel (Chlorocypha schmidti)
- Libellago andamanensis
- Tanzania jewel (Platycypha auripes)
- Rhinocypha dorsosanguinea
- Rhinocypha latimacula
- Mahale jewel (Stenocypha hasta)

==== Platycnemidids ====
- Calicnemia nipalica
- Coeliccia exoleta
- Coeliccia flavostriata
- Coeliccia fraseri
- Disparoneura apicalis
- Yellow-fronted threadtail (Elattoneura dorsalis)
- Elattoneura pasquinii
- Lieftinckia lairdi
- Nososticta phoenissa
- Nososticta plagioxantha
- Risiocnemis pulchra
- Ceres stream-damsel (Spesbona angusta)

==== Megapodagrionids ====
- Heteragrion flavovittatum
- Cuban hypolestes (Hypolestes trinitatis)
- Zoe waterfall damsel (Paraphlebia zoe)
- Philogenia cristalina
- Philosina alba
- Little wood elf (Sciotropis cyclanthorum)
- Teinopodagrion temporale

==== Gomphids ====
Species

- Top end dragon (Antipodogomphus dentosus)
- Cape thorntail (Ceratogomphus triceraticus)
- Crenigomphus abyssinicus
- Crenigomphus denticulatus
- Cyclogomphus gynostylus
- Gomphus lucasii
- Tennessee clubtail (Gomphus sandrius)
- Westfall's clubtail (Gomphus westfalli)
- Kakadu vicetail (Hemigomphus magela)
- Lamelligomphus tutulus
- Macrogomphus lankanensis
- Nepogomphoides stuhlmanni
- Dark pincertail (Onychogomphus assimilis)
- Waved pincertail (Onychogomphus flexuosus)
- Levant pincertail (Onychogomphus macrodon)
- Paragomphus tachyerges
- Pegtail (Perigomphus pallidistylus)
- Phyllogomphoides joaquini
- Yellow-sided clubtail (Stylurus potulentus)
- Townes's clubtail (Stylurus townesi)

Subspecies

- Erpetogomphus lampropeltis lampropeltis

==== Coenagrionids ====
Species

- Chimanimani bluet (Africallagma cuneistigma)
- Liberian wisp (Agriocnemis angustirami)
- Antiagrion blanchardi
- Sabino dancer (Argia sabino)
- Yellow waxtail (Ceriagrion citrinum)
- Turkish red damsel (Ceriagrion georgifreyi)
- Cretan bluet (Coenagrion intermedium)
- East coast giant (Coryphagrion grandis)
- Cuban bluet (Enallagma truncatum)
- Ethiopian bluetail (Ischnura abyssinica)
- San Francisco forktail (Ischnura gemina)
- Ischnura pamelae
- Mecistogaster asticta
- Oahu damselfly (Megalagrion oahuense)
- Oceanic Hawaiian damselfly (Megalagrion oceanicum)
- Pacific Hawaiian damselfly (Megalagrion pacificum)
- Orangeblack Hawaiian damselfly (Megalagrion xanthomelas)
- Mesamphiagrion ovigerum
- Mesamphiagrion rosseri
- Pericnemis triangularis
- Pseudagrion bicoerulans
- Pseudagrion guichardi
- Pseudagrion kaffinum
- Harlequin sprite (Pseudagrion newtoni)
- Pseudagrion pontogenes
- Vumba sprite (Pseudagrion vumbaense)
- Indian Ocean fineliner (Teinobasis alluaudi)
- Telebasis farcimentum

Subspecies

- Somalian bluet (Azuragrion somalicum amitinum)
- Frey's damselfly (Coenagrion hylas freyi)
- Blackline damselfly (Megalagrion nigrohamatum nigrolineatum)
- Pseudagrion sublacteum mortoni

==== Aeshnids ====
- Thylacine darner (Acanthaeschna victoria)
- Gynacantha bispina
- Gynacantha constricta
- Petaliaeschna flavipes
- Yemen hawker (Pinheyschna yemenensis)
- Planaeschna celia
- Sarasaeschna niisatoi

==== Libellulids ====
- Atoconeura aethiopica
- Bironides teuchestes
- Dark-winged groundling (Brachythemis fuscopalliata)
- Diplacina arsinoe
- Purple skimmer (Libellula jesseana)
- Micrathyria divergens
- Micrathyria pseudhypodidyma
- Mangrove skimmer (Orthetrum poecilops)
- Sympetrum gracile
- Urothemis abbotti

==== Other Odonata species ====
- Argiolestes realensis
- Bayadera hyalina
- Elegant malachite (Chlorolestes elegans)
- Cora lugubris
- Say's spiketail (Cordulegaster sayi)
- Drepanosticta centrosaurus
- Marbled malachite (Ecchlorolestes peringueyi)
- Euphaea basalis
- Euphaea pahyapi
- Guatemalan rubyspot (Hetaerina rudis)
- Rock narrow-wing (Lithosticta macra)
- Macromia erato
- Macromia irina
- Macromia katae
- Splendid cruiser (Macromia splendens)
- Metaphya elongata
- African twigtail (Nubiolestes diotima)
- Red relic (Pentaphlebia stahli)
- Peaked redspot (Phyllopetalia excrescens)
- Platysticta deccanensis
- Protosticta khaosoidaoensis
- Protosticta sanguinostigma
- Bulgarian emerald (Somatochlora borisi)
- Texas emerald (Somatochlora margarita)
- Yellow presba (Syncordulia gracilis)
- Mahogany presba (Syncordulia venator)
- Synthemis alecto
- Green-banded sparklewing (Umma declivium)
- Angola sparklewing (Umma femina)
- Purple sparklewing (Umma purpurea)
- Ringed boghaunter (Williamsonia lintneri)

== Other arthropod species ==
- Acrocyrtus sp. nov. 'HC - blind'
- Folsomides sp. nov. 'HC - blind'
- Atlantic horseshoe crab (Limulus polyphemus)
- Serpent Island centipede (Scolopendra abnormis)

== See also ==
- Lists of IUCN Red List vulnerable species
- List of least concern arthropods
- List of near threatened arthropods
- List of endangered arthropods
- List of critically endangered arthropods
- List of recently extinct arthropods
- List of data deficient arthropods
