= List of troglobites =

Animals that live underground

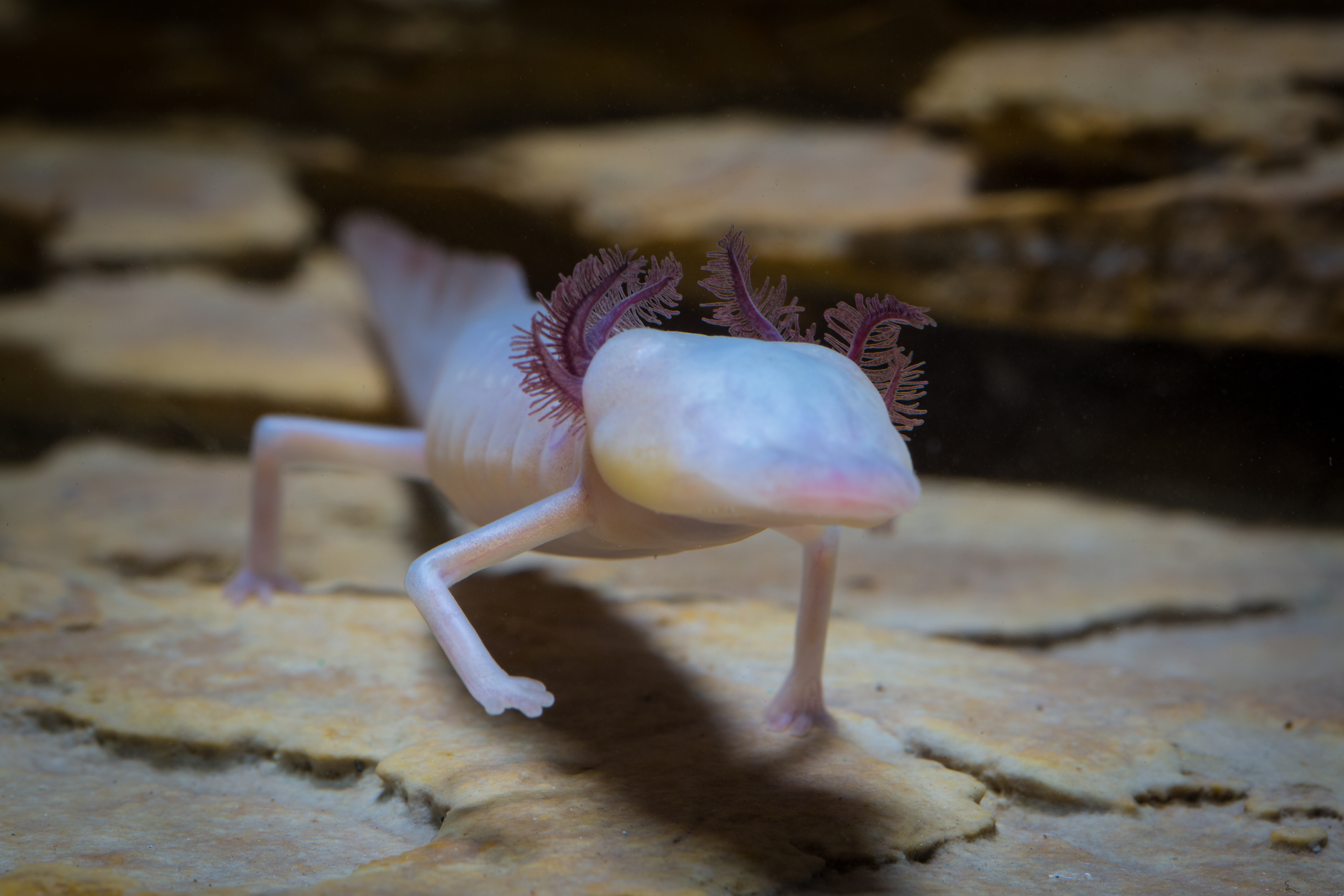
A troglobitic Texas blind salamander (Eurycea rathbuni)

A troglobite (or, formally, troglobiont) is a species, or population of a species, strictly bound to underground habitats, such as caves. These are separate from species that mainly live in above-ground habitats but are also able to live underground (eutroglophiles), and species that are only cave visitors (subtroglophiles and trogloxenes). Land-dwelling troglobites may be referred to as troglofauna, while aquatic species may be called stygofauna, although for these animals the term stygobite is preferable.

Troglobites typically display troglomorphism, which are morphological adaptations to cave life. Examples of such adaptations include slow metabolism, reduced energy consumption, better food usage efficiency, decrease or loss of eyesight (anophthalmia), and depigmentation (absence of pigment in the integument). Conversely, as opposed to lost or reduced functions, many species have evolved elongated antenna and locomotory appendages, in order to better move around and respond to environmental stimuli. These structures are also full of chemical, tactile, and humidity receptors. Troglobites commonly do not survive well outside caves and therefore cannot travel between separate cave systems. As a result, many troglobiotic species are endemic to a single cave or system of caves.

Not all cave dwelling species are considered to be troglobites. An animal found in an underground environment may be a troglophile (a species living both in subterranean and in epigean habitats, e.g. bats and cave swallows) or a trogloxene (a species only occurring sporadically in a hypogean habitat and unable to establish a subterranean population).

== Flatworms ==
- Hausera hauseri

== Mollusca ==
=== Bivalvia ===
- Congeria jalzici (cave clam)
- Congeria kusceri
- Congeria mualomerovici
- Eupera troglobia

=== Gastropoda ===
- Foushee Cavesnail (Amnicola cora)
- Angustopila psammion
- Tumbling Creek cavesnail (Antrobia culveri)
- Manitou cavesnail (Antrorbis breweri)
- Cecilioides
- Phantom cave snail (Pyrgulopsis texana)
- Peck's cave snail (Glyphyalinia pecki)
- Maitai Cave snail (Hadopyrgus ngataana)
- Laoennea renouardi
- Neritilia mimotoi
- Mimic cavesnail (Phreatodrobia imitata)
- Cave physa (Physella spelunca)
- Pisulina maxima
- Tashan cave snail (Trogloiranica tashanica)
- Zospeum tholussum

== Velvet worms ==
- White cave velvet worm (Peripatopsis alba)
- Speleoperipatus spelaeus

== Arthropoda ==
=== Arachnida ===
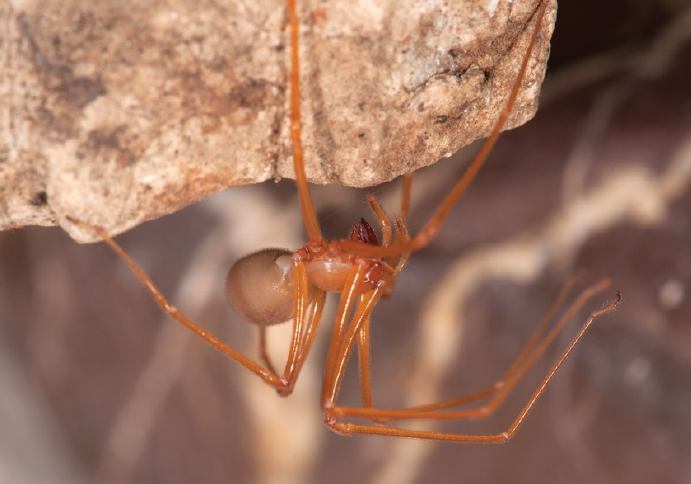
Trogloraptor marchingtoni (Female); captive specimen

- Acontius stercoricola
- Adelocosa anops – Kauaʻi cave wolf spider
- Anapistula (various spp.)
- Apneumonella (various spp.)
- Agraecina cristiani – Movile cave spider
- Anopsolobus subterraneus
- Aops oncodactylus – Barrow Island cave scorpion
- Apochthonius mysterius – Mystery cave pseudoscorpion
- Apochthonius typhlus – Stone County cave pseudoscorpion
- Baiami (various spp.)
- Calicina cloughensis
- Charinus spelaeus
- Chinquipellobunus madlae
- Chthonius (various spp.)
- Cicurina madla – Madla Cave meshweaver
- Cybaeus (various spp.)
- Cybaeozyga heterops
- Cycloctenus (various spp.)
- Desognanops humphreysi
- Dysderoides (various spp.)
- Gamasomorpha (various spp.)
- Herpyllus (various spp.)
- Hesperochernes occidentalis – guano pseudoscorpion
- Hexathele cavernicola
- Hickmania troglodytes
- Hongkongia (various spp.)
- Lycosa howarthi
- Lygromma sp.
- Hormurus polisorum – Christmas Island cave scorpion
- Maymena (various spp.)
- Mesostalita nocturna
- Mimetus strinatii
- Mundochthonius cavernicolus – cavernicolous pseudoscorpion
- Neobisium maritimum
- Nukuhiva adamsoni
- Olin platnicki
- Ossinissa justoi
- Parobisium yosemite – Yosemite cave pseudoscorpion
- Phanetta subterranea
- Phanotea (various spp.)
- Phyxelida makapanensis
- Porrhomma cavernicola – cavernicolous Porrhomma spider
- Porrhomma rosenhaueri
- Sinopoda scurion – Eyeless huntsman spider
- Spelocteniza ashmolei
- Spelungula cavernicola – Nelson cave spider
- Stalita taenaria
- Stiphidion (various spp.)
- Tartarus (various spp.)
- Telema (various spp.)
- Telemofila (various spp.)
- Tengella (various spp.)
- Texella reddelli
- Titanobochica magna – cave pseudoscorpion
- Toxopsiella (various spp.)
- Trichopelma
- Troglodiplura beirutpakbarai
- Troglodiplura challeni
- Troglodiplura harrisi
- Troglodiplura lowryi
- Troglodiplura samankunani
- Troglokhammouanus steineri – Xe Bang Fai cave scorpion
- Trogloneta (various spp.)
- Trogloraptor marchingtoni
- Troglothele
- Usofila (various spp.)
- Vietbocap lao – Nam Lot cave scorpion
- Wanops coecus

=== Myriapoda ===
Millipedes

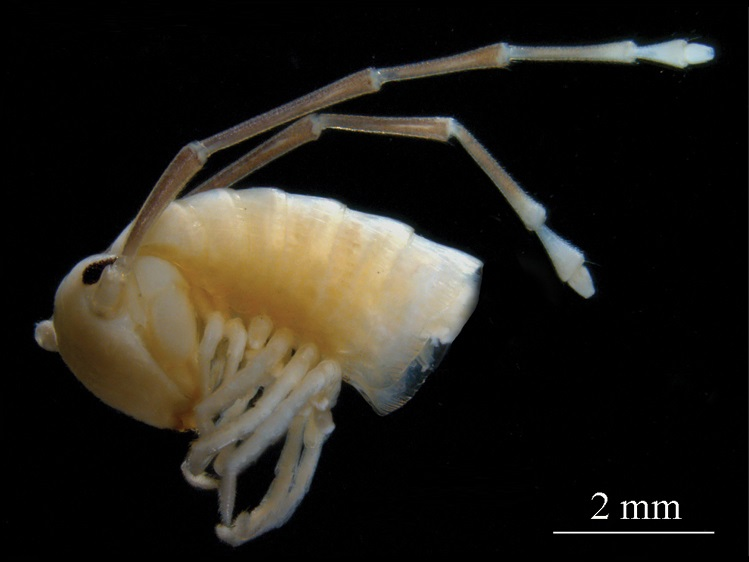
Head and anterior segments of Sinocallipus deharvengi

- Causeyella species
- Chaetaspis aleyorum – Aleys' cave millipede
- Chersoiulus sphinx
- Desmoxytes
- Mammamia profuga
- Polydesmus subterraneus
- Sinocallipus
- Tetracion
- Tingupa pallida
- Titanophyllum spiliarum
- Trichopetalum whitei
- Zosteractis interminata

Centipedes

- Cryptops speleorex
- Eupolybothrus cavernicolus
- Scolopocryptops troglocaudatus
- Geophilus hadesi
- Geophilus persephones

Symphylans

- Hanseniella magna

=== Crustacea ===
Crayfish

- Cambarus aculabrum – Benton County cave crayfish
- Cambarus cryptodytes – Dougherty Plain cave crayfish
- Cambarus hamulatus – Prickly cave crayfish
- Cambarus hubrichti – Salem cave crayfish
- Cambarus jonesi – Alabama cave crayfish
- Cambarus laconensis – Lacon Exit cave crayfish
- Cambarus nerterius – Greenbrier cave crayfish
- Cambarus pecki – phantom cave crayfish
- Cambarus setosus – Bristly cave crayfish
- Cambarus speleocoopi – Sweet Home Alabama cave crayfish
- Cambarus subterraneus – Delaware County cave crayfish
- Cambarus tartarus – Oklahoma Cave Crayfish
- Cambarus veitchorum – White Spring cave crayfish
- Cambarus zophonastes – Hell Creek cave crayfish
- Faxonius stygocaneyi – Caney Mountain cave crayfish
- Orconectes australis – Southern cave crayfish
- Orconectes barri – Cumberland Plateau cave crayfish
- Orconectes incomptus – Tennessee cave crayfish
- Orconectes inermis – Northern cave crayfish
  - Orconectes inermis inermis – ghost crayfish
  - Orconectes inermis testii – unarmed crayfish
- Orconectes packardi – Appalachian cave crayfish
- Orconectes pellucidus – Mammoth Cave crayfish
- Orconectes sheltae – Shelta cave crayfish
- Procambarus acherontis – Orlando cave crayfish
- Procambarus attiguus – Silver Glen Springs cave crayfish
- Procambarus cavernicola – Gabriel cave crayfish
- Procambarus clarkii – Louisiana crayfish (in Portugal and Italy)
- Procambarus delicatus – big-cheeked cave crayfish
- Procambarus erythrops – Santa Fe cave crayfish
- Procambarus franzi – Orange Lake cave crayfish
- Procambarus horsti – Big Blue Spring cave crayfish
- Procambarus leitheuseri – Coastal Lowland cave crayfish
- Procambarus lucifugus – Florida light-fleeing cave crayfish
  - Procambarus lucifugus lucifugus – Withlocoochee light-fleeing cave crayfish
  - Procambarus lucifugus alachua – Alachua light-fleeing cave crayfish
- Procambarus milleri – Miami cave crayfish
- Procambarus morrisi – Putnam County cave crayfish
- Procambarus niveus – Cuban cave crayfish
- Procambarus orcinus – Woodville Karst cave crayfish
- Troglocambarus maclanei – North Florida Spider Cave Crayfish
- Troglocambarus sp. 1 – Orlando Spider Cave Crayfish

Others

- Allocrangonyx hubrichti – Hubricht's long-tailed amphipod
- Alpioniscus strasseri
- Andhracoides gebaueri– Belum cave isopod
- Andhracoides shabuddin– Guthikonda cave isopod
- Androniscus dentiger – rosy woodlouse
- Bactrurus brachycaudus – short-tailed groundwater amphipod
- Bactrurus hubrichti – sword-tail cave amphipod
- Bactrurus pseudomucronatus – false sword-tailed cave amphipod
- Barburia yanezi
- Caecidotea antricola – cave isopod
- Caecidotea dimorpha – Missouri cave isopod
- Caecidotea fustis – Fustis cave isopod
- Caecidotea salemensis – Salem cave isopod
- Caecidotea serrata – serrated cave isopod
- Caecidotea stiladactyla – slender-fingered cave isopod
- Caecidotea stygia – stygian cave isopod
- Cancrocaeca
- Cerberusa
- Chaceus caecus
- Cyclops vernalis
- Diacyclops yeatmani – Yeatman's groundwater copepod
- Diyutamon cereum
- Gammarus acherondytes – Illinois cave amphipod
- Holoped amazonicum
- Lirceus usdagalun – Lee County cave isopod
- Macromaxillocaris
- Munidopsis polymorpha – Blind albino cave crab
- Niphargus species
- Orcovita hickski
- Orcovita orchardorum
- Palaemonias alabamae – Alabama cave shrimp
- Palaemonias ganteri – Kentucky cave shrimp
- Phasmon typhlops
- Samarplax principe
- Spelaeorchestia koloana
- Speocirolana
- Stygiocaris
- Stygobromus barri – Barr's cave amphipod
- Stygobromus clantoni – Clanton's cave amphipod
- Stygobromus heteropodus – Pickle Springs amphipod
- Stygobromus onondagaensis – Onondaga cave amphipod
- Stygobromus ozarkensis – Ozark cave amphipod
- Stygobromus parvus – minute cave amphipod
- Stygobromus subtilis – subtle cave amphipod
- Teretamon spelaeum
- Troglocaris
- Typhlatya
- Typhlocaris
- Typhlocirolana
- Typhlopseudothelphusa
- Villalobosius lopezformenti
- Yucatalana

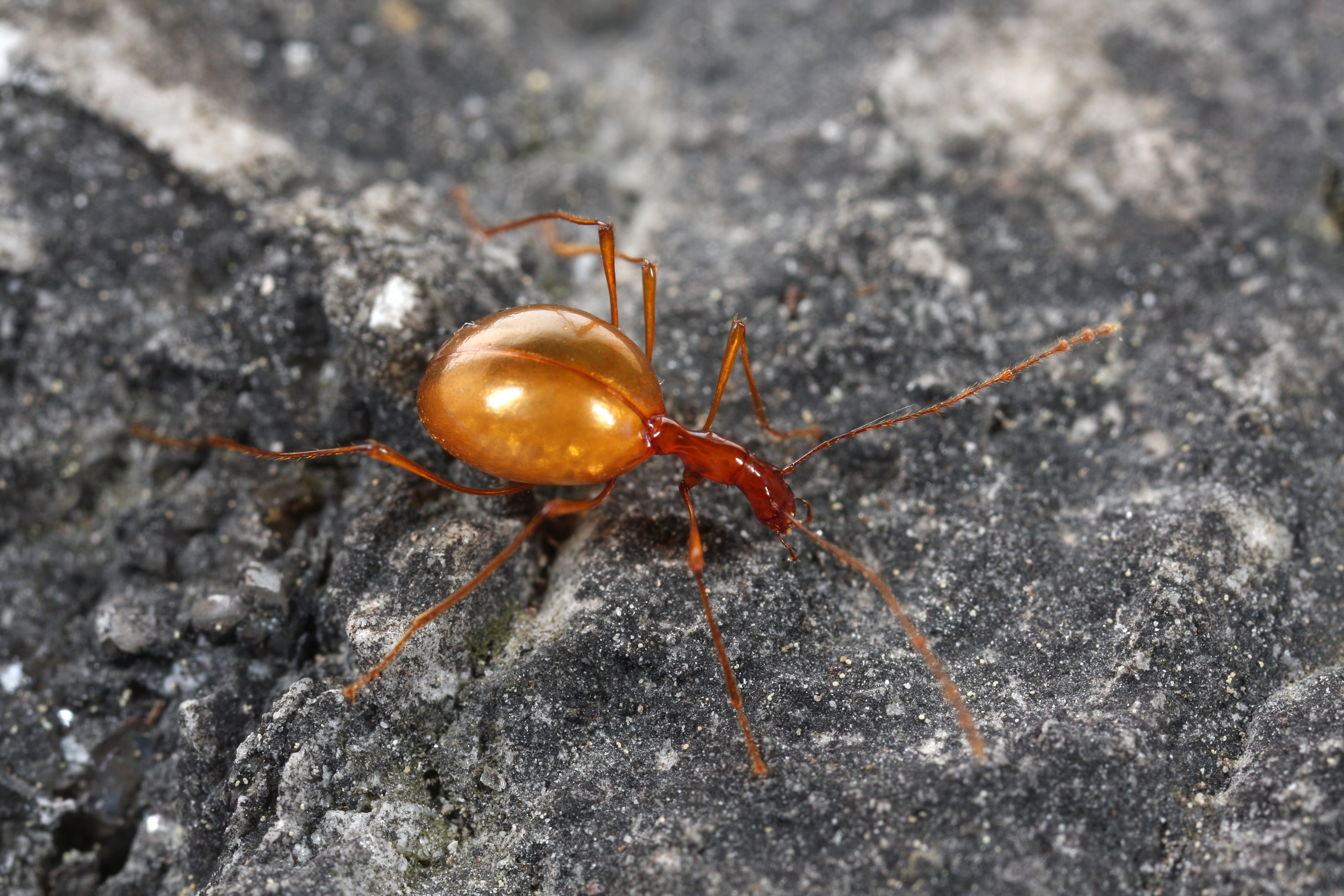
Leptodirus hochenwartii, a species of cave adapted beetle from various European localites.

== Fish ==
- List of cave fish

== Amphibians ==
- Cave salamanders

== Mammals ==
No known mammals live exclusively in caves. Most bats sleep in caves during the day and hunt at night, but they are considered troglophiles or trogloxenes. However some fossorials which spend their whole lives underground might be considered subterranean fauna, although they are not true troglofauna as they do not live in caves.

== Echinodermata ==
- Asterinides sp.
- Copidaster cavernicola – Cozumel's cave sea star
- Ophionereis commutabilis

== Porifera ==
- Eunapius subterraneus
- Racekiela cavernicola

== Annelida ==
- Erpobdella borisi
- Erpobdella mestrovi
- Haemopis caeca
- Marifugia cavatica

== See also ==
- Subterranean fauna
- Troglofauna
