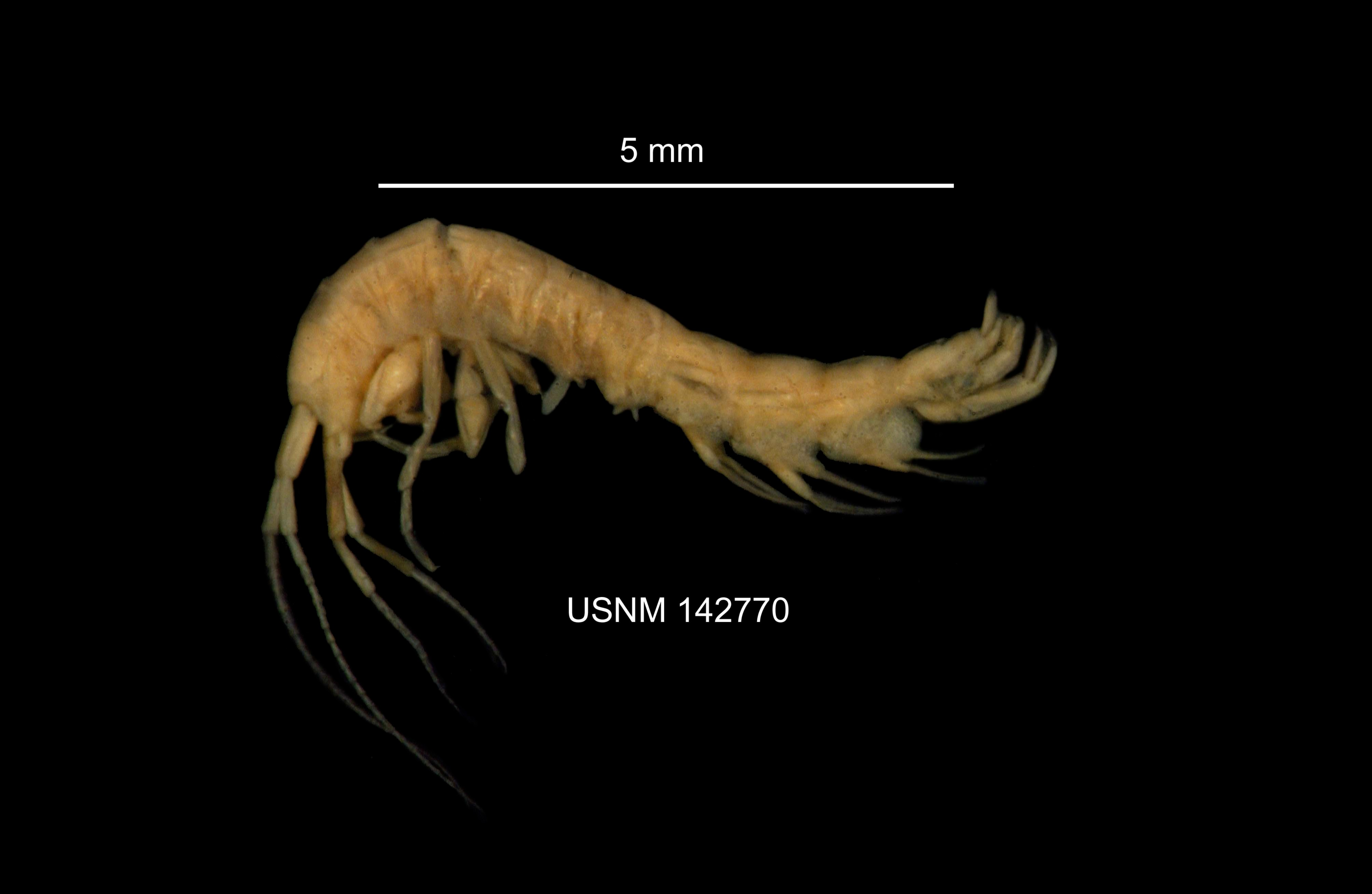

Conservation status
- Endangered (IUCN 3.1)

- Critically Imperiled (NatureServe)

Scientific classification
- Kingdom: Animalia
- Phylum: Arthropoda
- Clade: Pancrustacea
- Class: Malacostraca
- Order: Amphipoda
- Family: Crangonyctidae
- Genus: Stygobromus
- Species: S. hayi

Binomial name
- Stygobromus hayi (Hubricht & Mackin, 1940)

= Stygobromus hayi =

Species of crustacean

Stygobromus hayi is a rare species of crustacean known by the common name Hay's spring amphipod. It is endemic to the District of Columbia in the United States, where it occurs only in Rock Creek, a tributary of the Potomac River. It is a federally listed endangered species, is listed as Endangered on the IUCN Red List, and as Critically Imperiled by NatureServe.

One of three amphipods that are found only in the District of Columbia, this species has been called "Washington D.C.'s most famous endemic". Hay's spring amphipod lives in five springs along Rock Creek, occurrences which make up a single population. All the sites are located in a three-mile stretch of the creek. The amphipod lives in seeps formed when water rises through the substrate and is then trapped just under the ground surface by a clay layer.

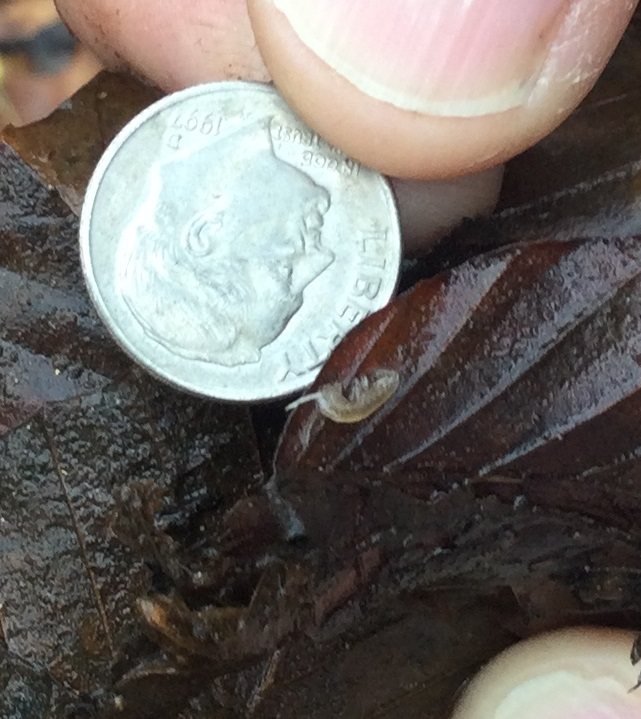
Hay's spring amphipod compared to the size of a dime.

This amphipod measures 10 millimeters (0.39 in) in length. Because it lives underground, it is white in color and eyeless.

This species is threatened by the degradation of its urban habitat. Heavy metals have been detected in the area. Other forms of pollution could occur, such as oil spills, sewer leaks, and fertilizer runoff. Flooding may destroy individuals and remove the microhabitat they inhabit. Construction nearby may damage the creek. Recreational activity next to the creek may increase the likelihood of pollution.

Rock Creek Park protects the creeks and its springs. Different agencies monitor the creek and its sensitive species, including this amphipod and its relative, Stygobromus kenki.
