= Stygobromus emarginatus =

Conservation status
- Vulnerable (IUCN 3.1)

- Vulnerable (NatureServe)

Scientific classification
- Kingdom: Animalia
- Phylum: Arthropoda
- Class: Malacostraca
- Order: Amphipoda
- Family: Crangonyctidae
- Genus: Stygobromus
- Species: S. emarginatus

Binomial name
- Stygobromus emarginatus (Hubricht, 1943)

Species of crustacean

Stygobromus emarginatus, commonly called Greenbrier cave amphipod, is a troglomorphic species of amphipod in family Crangonyctidae. It is native to Maryland and West Virginia in the United States.
