= Stygobromus albapinus =

Scientific classification
- Domain: Eukaryota
- Kingdom: Animalia
- Phylum: Arthropoda
- Class: Malacostraca
- Order: Amphipoda
- Family: Crangonyctidae
- Genus: Stygobromus
- Species: S. albapinus

Binomial name
- Stygobromus albapinus Taylor & Holsinger, 2011

Species of crustacean

Stygobromus albapinus, the White Pine amphipod, is a troglomorphic species of amphipod in family Crangonyctidae. It is endemic to White Pine County, Nevada, where it occurs only in two pools in Model Cave in the Great Basin National Park.
