= Stygobromus smithi =

Conservation status
- Vulnerable (IUCN 3.1)

- Imperiled (NatureServe)

Scientific classification
- Kingdom: Animalia
- Phylum: Arthropoda
- Class: Malacostraca
- Order: Amphipoda
- Family: Crangonyctidae
- Genus: Stygobromus
- Species: S. smithi

Binomial name
- Stygobromus smithi Hubricht, 1943

Synonyms
- Stygobromus smithii

Species of crustacean

Stygobromus smithi, the Alabama well amphipod, is a phreatobite species of crustacean in family Crangonyctidae. It is endemic to Alabama in the United States.
