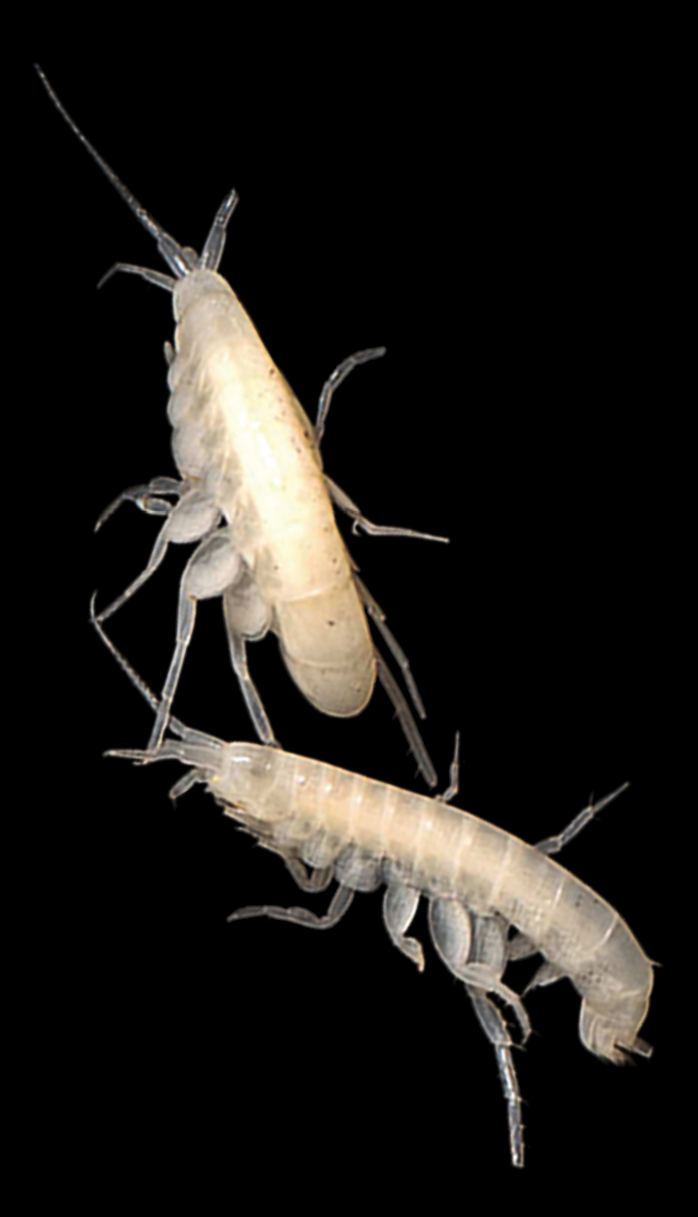

Conservation status
- Vulnerable (IUCN 3.1)

- Imperiled (NatureServe)

Scientific classification
- Kingdom: Animalia
- Phylum: Arthropoda
- Clade: Pancrustacea
- Class: Malacostraca
- Order: Amphipoda
- Family: Crangonyctidae
- Genus: Stygobromus
- Species: S. balconis

Binomial name
- Stygobromus balconis (Hubricht, 1943)

= Stygobromus balconis =

Species of crustacean

Stygobromus balconis, the Balcones cave amphipod, is a troglomorphic species of amphipod in family Crangonyctidae. It is endemic to Texas in the United States.

The common name refers to the Balcones escarpment in central Texas.

== See also ==
- Balcones Canyonlands National Wildlife Refuge
- Palaemonetes antrorum - Balcones cave shrimp
