= Stygobromus reddelli =

Conservation status
- Vulnerable (IUCN 3.1)

- Critically Imperiled (NatureServe)

Scientific classification
- Kingdom: Animalia
- Phylum: Arthropoda
- Class: Malacostraca
- Order: Amphipoda
- Family: Crangonyctidae
- Genus: Stygobromus
- Species: S. reddelli

Binomial name
- Stygobromus reddelli (Holsinger, 1966)

Species of crustacean

Stygobromus reddelli, commonly called Reddell's cave amphipod or Reddell's stygobromid, is a troglomorphic species of amphipod in family Crangonyctidae. It is endemic to Texas in the United States.
