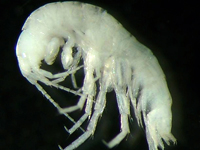

Conservation status
- Vulnerable (IUCN 3.1)

- Critically Imperiled (NatureServe)

Scientific classification
- Kingdom: Animalia
- Phylum: Arthropoda
- Class: Malacostraca
- Order: Amphipoda
- Family: Crangonyctidae
- Genus: Stygobromus
- Species: S. heteropodus

Binomial name
- Stygobromus heteropodus Hubricht, 1943

= Stygobromus heteropodus =

Species of crustacean

Stygobromus heteropodus, commonly called Pickle Springs amphipod, is a phreatobite species of amphipod in family Crangonyctidae. It is endemic to Ste. Genevieve County, Missouri in the United States.
