= Stygobromus onondagaensis =

Conservation status
- Vulnerable (IUCN 3.1)

- Vulnerable (NatureServe)

Scientific classification
- Kingdom: Animalia
- Phylum: Arthropoda
- Class: Malacostraca
- Order: Amphipoda
- Family: Crangonyctidae
- Genus: Stygobromus
- Species: S. onondagaensis

Binomial name
- Stygobromus onondagaensis (Hubricht & Mackin, 1940)

Species of crustacean

Stygobromus onondagaensis, commonly called Onondaga Cave amphipod, is a troglomorphic species of amphipod in the Crangonyctidae family. It is native to Arkansas, Kansas, Missouri and Oklahoma in the United States.

== See also ==
- Onondaga Cave State Park
