= Stygobromus arizonensis =

Conservation status
- Vulnerable (IUCN 3.1)

- Critically Imperiled (NatureServe)

Scientific classification
- Kingdom: Animalia
- Phylum: Arthropoda
- Class: Malacostraca
- Order: Amphipoda
- Family: Crangonyctidae
- Genus: Stygobromus
- Species: S. arizonensis

Binomial name
- Stygobromus arizonensis (Holsinger, 1974)

Species of crustacean

Stygobromus arizonensis, the Arizona cave amphipod, is a troglomorphic species of amphipod in family Crangonyctidae. It is endemic to Arizona in the United States.

It is known only from three specimens; two collected at a cave on the Flying "H" Ranch in 1963 and one from a mine near Paradise, Arizona. It has not been collected since then. The main threat to its survival is abstraction of groundwater.
