= Stygobromus hubbsi =

Conservation status
- Vulnerable (IUCN 3.1)

- Critically Imperiled (NatureServe)

Scientific classification
- Kingdom: Animalia
- Phylum: Arthropoda
- Class: Malacostraca
- Order: Amphipoda
- Family: Crangonyctidae
- Genus: Stygobromus
- Species: S. hubbsi

Binomial name
- Stygobromus hubbsi Shoemaker, 1942

Species of crustacean

Stygobromus hubbsi, commonly called Malheur Cave amphipod, is a troglomorphic species of amphipod in family Crangonyctidae. It is endemic to Oregon in the United States. It is only found in Malheur Cave, which is a 3,000 ft (910 m) long lava tube.
