= Stygobromus hadenoecus =

Conservation status
- Vulnerable (IUCN 3.1)

- Critically Imperiled (NatureServe)

Scientific classification
- Kingdom: Animalia
- Phylum: Arthropoda
- Class: Malacostraca
- Order: Amphipoda
- Family: Crangonyctidae
- Genus: Stygobromus
- Species: S. hadenoecus

Binomial name
- Stygobromus hadenoecus (Holsinger, 1966)

Species of crustacean

Stygobromus hadenoecus, commonly called Devil's Sinkhole amphipod, is a troglomorphic species of amphipod in family Crangonyctidae. It is endemic to Texas in the United States.

== See also ==
- Devil's Sinkhole State Natural Area - the National Natural Landmark where it lives in three lakes inside the big cave.
