= Stygobromus wengerorum =

Conservation status
- Vulnerable (IUCN 3.1)

- Critically Imperiled (NatureServe)

Scientific classification
- Kingdom: Animalia
- Phylum: Arthropoda
- Class: Malacostraca
- Order: Amphipoda
- Family: Crangonyctidae
- Genus: Stygobromus
- Species: S. wengerorum

Binomial name
- Stygobromus wengerorum Holsinger, 1974

Species of crustacean

Stygobromus wengerorum, commonly called Wenger's cave amphipod, is a troglomorphic species of amphipod in family Crangonyctidae. It is endemic to two caves in Mariposa County, California in the United States.
