= Stygobromus longipes =

Conservation status
- Vulnerable (IUCN 3.1)

- Imperiled (NatureServe)

Scientific classification
- Kingdom: Animalia
- Phylum: Arthropoda
- Class: Malacostraca
- Order: Amphipoda
- Family: Crangonyctidae
- Genus: Stygobromus
- Species: S. longipes

Binomial name
- Stygobromus longipes (Holsinger, 1966)

Species of crustacean

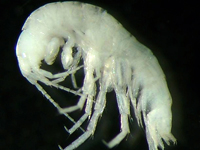

Stygobromus longipes, commonly called long-legged cave amphipod, is a troglomorphic species of amphipod in family Crangonyctidae. It is endemic to Texas in the United States.
