= Stygobromus putealis =

Conservation status
- Vulnerable (IUCN 3.1)

- Imperiled (NatureServe)

Scientific classification
- Kingdom: Animalia
- Phylum: Arthropoda
- Class: Malacostraca
- Order: Amphipoda
- Family: Crangonyctidae
- Genus: Stygobromus
- Species: S. putealis

Binomial name
- Stygobromus putealis (Holmes, 1909)

Species of crustacean

Stygobromus putealis, commonly called the Wisconsin well amphipod, is a phreatobite species of amphipod in family Crangonyctidae. It is endemic to Wisconsin in the United States.
