= Stygobromus dejectus =

Conservation status
- Vulnerable (IUCN 3.1)

- Critically Imperiled (NatureServe)

Scientific classification
- Kingdom: Animalia
- Phylum: Arthropoda
- Class: Malacostraca
- Order: Amphipoda
- Family: Crangonyctidae
- Genus: Stygobromus
- Species: S. dejectus

Binomial name
- Stygobromus dejectus (Holsinger, 1967)

Species of crustacean

Stygobromus dejectus, commonly called Cascade Cave amphipod, is a troglomorphic species of amphipod in family Crangonyctidae. It is endemic to Texas in the United States.

== See also ==
- Cascade Caverns
