= Stygobromus mundus =

Conservation status
- Vulnerable (IUCN 3.1)

- Imperiled (NatureServe)

Scientific classification
- Kingdom: Animalia
- Phylum: Arthropoda
- Class: Malacostraca
- Order: Amphipoda
- Family: Crangonyctidae
- Genus: Stygobromus
- Species: S. mundus

Binomial name
- Stygobromus mundus (Holsinger, 1967)

Synonyms
- Stygobromus mundaus (Holsinger, 1967) [orth. error]

Species of crustacean

Stygobromus mundus, commonly called Bath County cave amphipod, is a troglomorphic species of amphipod in family Crangonyctidae. It is endemic to Bath County, Virginia in the United States.
