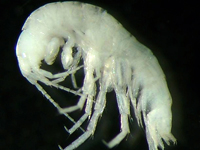

Conservation status
- Imperiled (NatureServe)

Scientific classification
- Kingdom: Animalia
- Phylum: Arthropoda
- Clade: Pancrustacea
- Class: Malacostraca
- Order: Amphipoda
- Family: Crangonyctidae
- Genus: Stygobromus
- Species: S. kenki

Binomial name
- Stygobromus kenki (Holsinger, 1978)

= Stygobromus kenki =

Species of crustacean

Stygobromus kenki is a rare species of amphipod, a crustacean. Its common names include Kenk's amphipod, Rock Creek groundwater amphipod, and Rock Creek stygobromid.

This species lives only in Washington, D.C., the Calvert Formation in Virginia and Montgomery County, Maryland, in the United States. It can be found only in the Potomac River watershed. Its entire range is less than 40 square miles. It has only been found at five sites at springs or seeps in the local waterways.

This species is small, the largest female measuring about 5.5 mm in length and the largest male about 3.7 mm. It can only be identified by microscopic examination, which requires that the specimen be killed; therefore, scientists prefer not to attempt identification of these rare amphipods.

The species lives in and near water in freshwater habitat. It can be found in detritus and sediment along springs and seeps.

The amphipod was first collected in 1967 in Rock Creek Park, where it was discovered by Roman Kenk. J. R. Holsinger then named it after him in 1978.

This species can be found with another endangered amphipod of the same genus, Stygobromus hayi.
