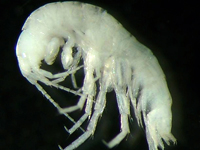

Conservation status
- Vulnerable (IUCN 3.1)

- Vulnerable (NatureServe)

Scientific classification
- Kingdom: Animalia
- Phylum: Arthropoda
- Class: Malacostraca
- Order: Amphipoda
- Family: Crangonyctidae
- Genus: Stygobromus
- Species: S. bifurcatus

Binomial name
- Stygobromus bifurcatus (Holsinger, 1967)

Synonyms
- Stygonectes bifurcatus

= Stygobromus bifurcatus =

Species of crustacean

Stygobromus bifurcatus, the bifurcated cave amphipod, is a troglomorphic species of amphipod in family Crangonyctidae. It is endemic to Texas in the United States.
