= Stygobromus subtilis =

Conservation status
- Vulnerable (IUCN 3.1)

- Imperiled (NatureServe)

Scientific classification
- Kingdom: Animalia
- Phylum: Arthropoda
- Class: Malacostraca
- Order: Amphipoda
- Family: Crangonyctidae
- Genus: Stygobromus
- Species: S. subtilis

Binomial name
- Stygobromus subtilis (Hubricht, 1943)

Species of crustacean

Stygobromus subtilis, commonly called the subtle cave amphipod, is a troglomorphic species of amphipod in family Crangonyctidae. It is native to Illinois, Michigan and Missouri in the United States.
