= Stygobromus conradi =

Conservation status
- Vulnerable (IUCN 2.3)

- Imperiled (NatureServe)

Scientific classification
- Kingdom: Animalia
- Phylum: Arthropoda
- Class: Malacostraca
- Order: Amphipoda
- Family: Crangonyctidae
- Genus: Stygobromus
- Species: S. conradi

Binomial name
- Stygobromus conradi (Holsinger, 1967)

Synonyms
- Stygonectes conradi Holsinger, 1967

Species of crustacean

Stygobromus conradi, commonly called Burnsville Cove cave amphipod, is a troglomorphic species of amphipod in family Crangonyctidae. It is endemic to Virginia in the United States.

== See also ==
- Butler Cave Conservation Society
