= Stygobromus russelli =

Conservation status
- Apparently Secure (NatureServe)

Scientific classification
- Domain: Eukaryota
- Kingdom: Animalia
- Phylum: Arthropoda
- Class: Malacostraca
- Order: Amphipoda
- Family: Crangonyctidae
- Genus: Stygobromus
- Species: S. russelli

Binomial name
- Stygobromus russelli (Holsinger, 1967)

Synonyms
- Stygonectes russelli Holsinger, 1967

Species of crustacean

Stygobromus russelli, known generally as the Russell stygobromid or Russell's cave amphipod, is a species of amphipod in the family Crangonyctidae. It is endemic to Texas in the United States.
