= Stygobromus lucifugus =

Conservation status
- Extinct (IUCN 3.1)

Scientific classification
- Kingdom: Animalia
- Phylum: Arthropoda
- Clade: Pancrustacea
- Class: Malacostraca
- Order: Amphipoda
- Family: Crangonyctidae
- Genus: Stygobromus
- Species: †S. lucifugus

Binomial name
- †Stygobromus lucifugus (O.P. Hay, 1882)

Synonyms
- Apocrangonyx lucifugus (O.P. Hay, 1882); Crangonyx lucifugus O.P. Hay, 1882

Extinct species of crustacean

Stygobromus lucifugus, the rubious cave amphipod is an extinct species of amphipod crustacean in the family Crangonyctidae. It was first described by Oliver Perry Hay in 1882, who found it living in a well near Abingdon, Knox County, Illinois, United States, and it was endemic to that state.
