= Stygobromus montanus =

Conservation status
- Vulnerable (IUCN 3.1)

- Critically Imperiled (NatureServe)

Scientific classification
- Kingdom: Animalia
- Phylum: Arthropoda
- Class: Malacostraca
- Order: Amphipoda
- Family: Crangonyctidae
- Genus: Stygobromus
- Species: S. montanus

Binomial name
- Stygobromus montanus (Holsinger, 1967)

Species of crustacean

Stygobromus montanus, commonly called Mountain cave amphipod, is a troglomorphic species of amphipod in family Crangonyctidae. It is endemic to Arkansas, in the United States.
