= Stygobromus mackenziei =

Conservation status
- Vulnerable (IUCN 3.1)

- Critically Imperiled (NatureServe)

Scientific classification
- Kingdom: Animalia
- Phylum: Arthropoda
- Class: Malacostraca
- Order: Amphipoda
- Family: Crangonyctidae
- Genus: Stygobromus
- Species: S. mackenziei

Binomial name
- Stygobromus mackenziei Holsinger, 1974

Species of crustacean

Stygobromus mackenziei, commonly called Mackenzie's cave amphipod, is a troglomorphic species of amphipod in family Crangonyctidae. It is endemic to California, where it occurs only in Empire Cave. This cave is part of the Porter Caves, in the grounds of University of California, Santa Cruz.
