= Stygobromus nortoni =

Conservation status
- Vulnerable (IUCN 3.1)

- Imperiled (NatureServe)

Scientific classification
- Kingdom: Animalia
- Phylum: Arthropoda
- Class: Malacostraca
- Order: Amphipoda
- Family: Crangonyctidae
- Genus: Stygobromus
- Species: S. nortoni

Binomial name
- Stygobromus nortoni (Holsinger, 1969)

Species of crustacean

Stygobromus nortoni, commonly called Norton's cave amphipod, is a troglomorphic species of amphipod in family Crangonyctidae. It is endemic to Tennessee in the United States.
