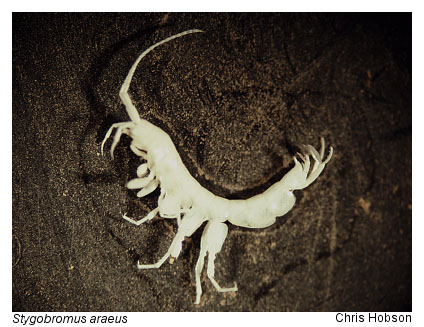

Conservation status
- Vulnerable (IUCN 3.1)

- Vulnerable (NatureServe)

Scientific classification
- Kingdom: Animalia
- Phylum: Arthropoda
- Class: Malacostraca
- Order: Amphipoda
- Family: Crangonyctidae
- Genus: Stygobromus
- Species: S. araeus

Binomial name
- Stygobromus araeus (Holsinger, 1969)

= Stygobromus araeus =

Species of crustacean

Stygobromus araeus, the Tidewater interstitial amphipod, is a phreatobite species of amphipod in family Crangonyctidae. It is native to Virginia and North Carolina in the United States.

The main threat to its survival is abstraction of, and pollution to, the groundwater caused by the rapidly expanding urban area of Tidewater, Virginia.
