= Stygobromus canadensis =

Conservation status
- Critically Imperiled (NatureServe)

Scientific classification
- Kingdom: Animalia
- Phylum: Arthropoda
- Clade: Pancrustacea
- Class: Malacostraca
- Order: Amphipoda
- Family: Crangonyctidae
- Genus: Stygobromus
- Species: S. canadensis

Binomial name
- Stygobromus canadensis Holsinger, 1980

Species of amphipod

Stygobromus canadensis, the Castleguard Cave stygobromid, is a species of amphipod in the Crangonyctidae family and Stygobromus genus. It is endemic to Castleguard Cave in Alberta, Canada. It was first described by John Holsinger in 1980. It is currently listed as critically imperiled by NatureServe.

The presence of this species has led to the cave's designation as a Key Biodiversity Area.
