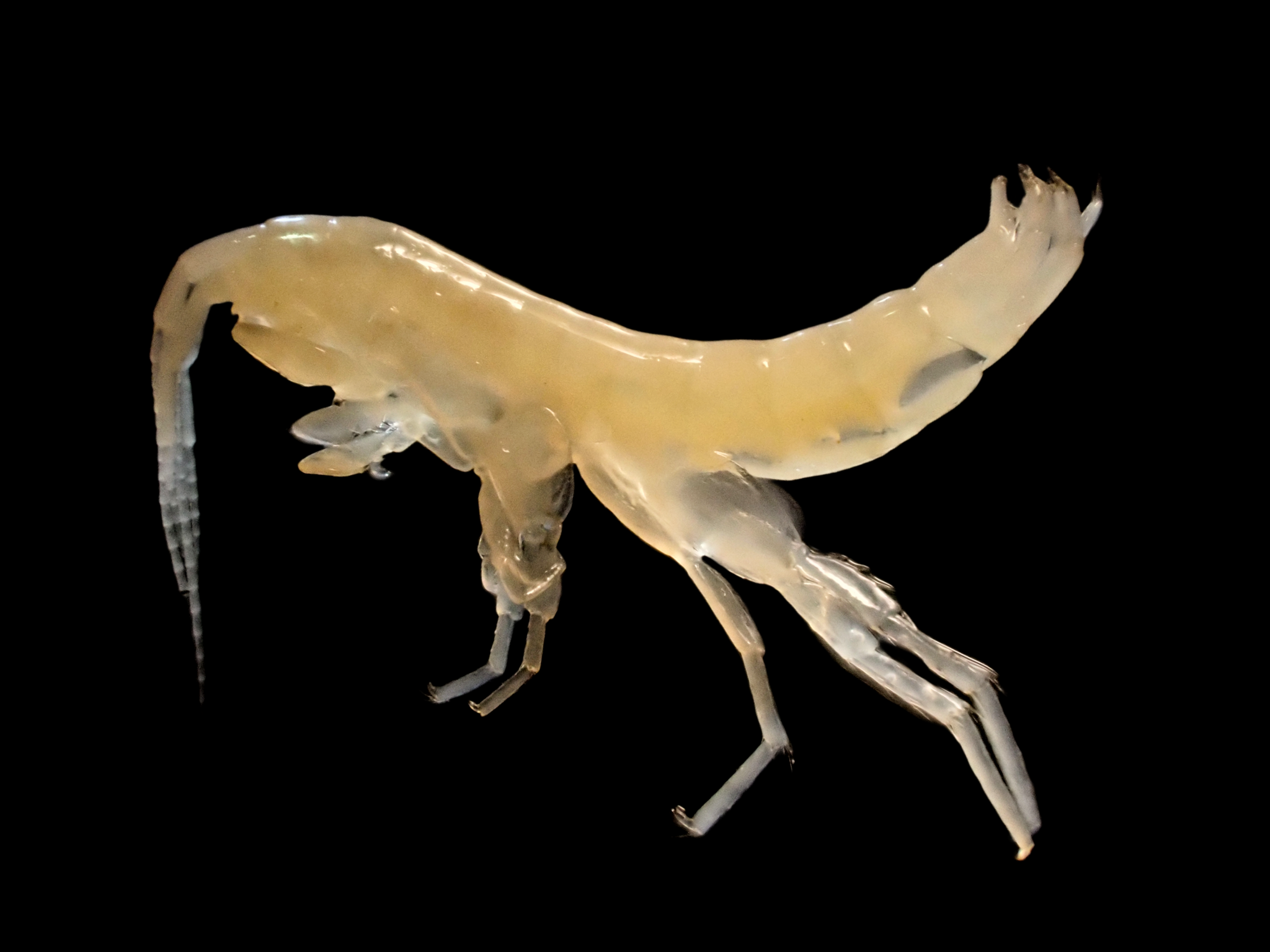

Conservation status
- Vulnerable (IUCN 3.1)

- Vulnerable (NatureServe)

Scientific classification
- Kingdom: Animalia
- Phylum: Arthropoda
- Class: Malacostraca
- Order: Amphipoda
- Family: Crangonyctidae
- Genus: Stygobromus
- Species: S. pizzinii

Binomial name
- Stygobromus pizzinii (Shoemaker, 1938)

Synonyms
- Stygonectes pizzinii (Shoemaker, 1938)

= Stygobromus pizzinii =

Species of crustacean

Stygobromus pizzinii, commonly called Pizzini's cave amphipod, is a troglomorphic species of amphipod in the family Crangonyctidae. It is found in the eastern United States where it is native to the District of Columbia, Maryland, Pennsylvania and Virginia.
