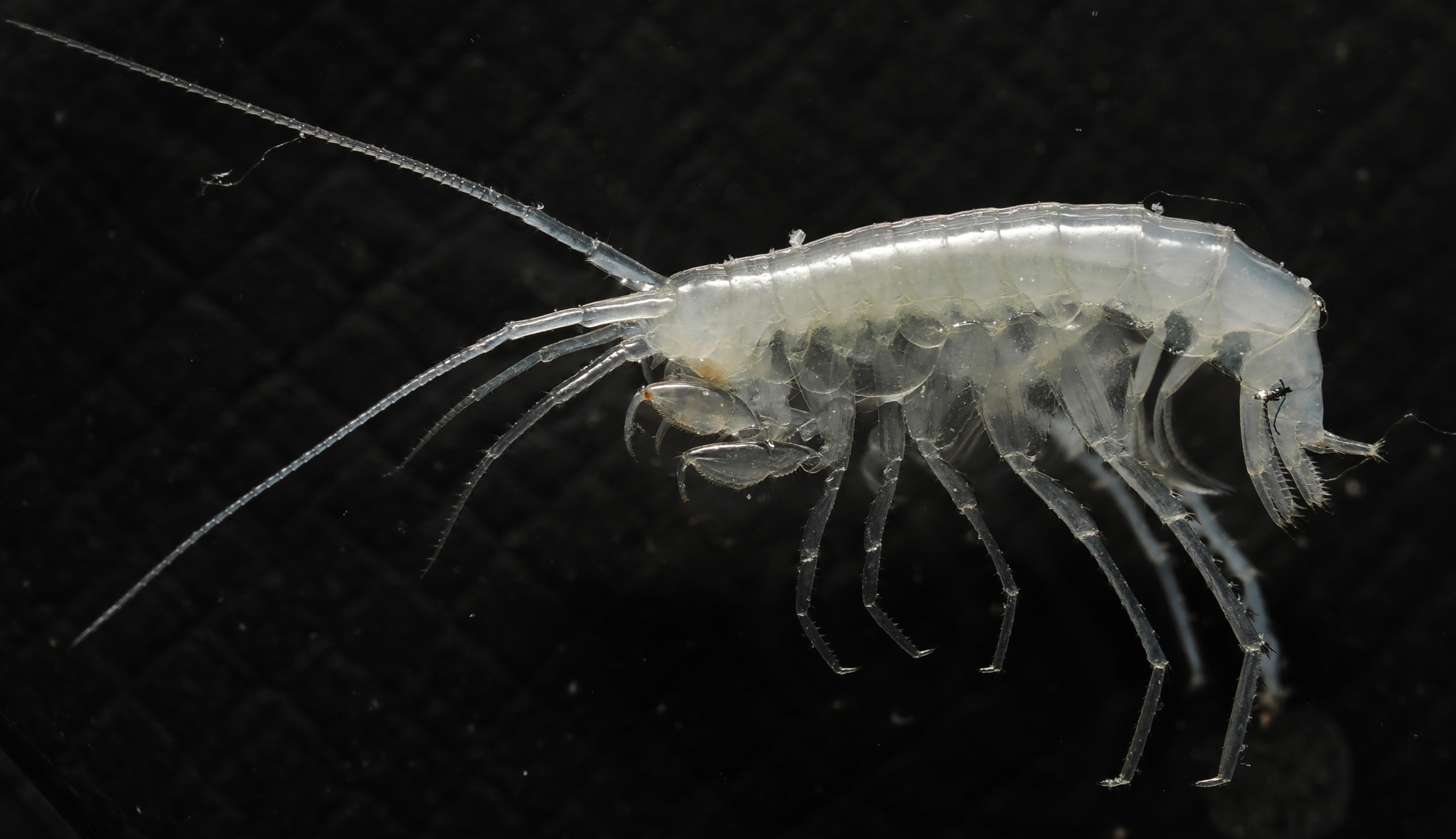

Conservation status
- Vulnerable (IUCN 3.1)

- Imperiled (NatureServe)

Scientific classification
- Kingdom: Animalia
- Phylum: Arthropoda
- Clade: Pancrustacea
- Class: Malacostraca
- Order: Amphipoda
- Family: Crangonyctidae
- Genus: Stygobromus
- Species: S. flagellatus

Binomial name
- Stygobromus flagellatus (J. E. Benedict, 1896)

= Stygobromus flagellatus =

Species of crustacean

Stygobromus flagellatus, commonly known as Ezell's Cave amphipod, is a troglomorphic species of amphipod in the family Crangonyctidae. It is endemic to Texas in the United States.

== See also ==
- Edwards Aquifer - where it lives, only in one pool of Ezell's Cave.
