= Stygobromus clantoni =

Conservation status
- Vulnerable (IUCN 3.1)

- Apparently Secure (NatureServe)

Scientific classification
- Kingdom: Animalia
- Phylum: Arthropoda
- Class: Malacostraca
- Order: Amphipoda
- Family: Crangonyctidae
- Genus: Stygobromus
- Species: S. clantoni

Binomial name
- Stygobromus clantoni (Creaser, 1934)

Species of crustacean

Stygobromus clantoni, commonly called Clanton's cave amphipod, is a troglomorphic species of amphipod in family Crangonyctidae. It is native to Kansas and Missouri in the United States.
