= Stygobromus ozarkensis =

Conservation status
- Vulnerable (IUCN 3.1)

- Apparently Secure (NatureServe)

Scientific classification
- Kingdom: Animalia
- Phylum: Arthropoda
- Class: Malacostraca
- Order: Amphipoda
- Family: Crangonyctidae
- Genus: Stygobromus
- Species: S. ozarkensis

Binomial name
- Stygobromus ozarkensis (Holsinger, 1967)

Species of crustacean

Stygobromus ozarkensis, commonly called Ozark cave amphipod, is a troglomorphic species of amphipod in family Crangonyctidae. It is native to Arkansas, Missouri and Oklahoma in the United States.
