= Monolistra =

Scientific classification
- Kingdom: Animalia
- Phylum: Arthropoda
- Clade: Pancrustacea
- Class: Malacostraca
- Order: Isopoda
- Family: Sphaeromatidae
- Genus: Monolistra; Gerstaecker, 1856

Genus of crustaceans

Monolistra is a genus of troglobiotic isopod crustaceans in the family Sphaeromatidae. Its members are distributed in the European continental karst groundwaters, restricted to countries of the former Yugoslavia, Italy and Switzerland. It contains the following subgenera and species, four of which are listed as vulnerable (VU) or endangered (EN) on the IUCN Red List:

Microlistra Gerstaecker, 1856

- Monolistra bolei (Sket, 1960) – Slovenia
- Monolistra calopyge Sket, 1982 – Slovenia
- Monolistra pretneri Sket, 1964 – Croatia
- Monolistra schottlaenderi Stammer, 1930 – Italy
- Monolistra sketi (Deeleman-Reinhold, 1971) – Croatia
- Monolistra spinosa (Racovitza, 1929) – Slovenia
- Monolistra spinosissima (Racovitza, 1929) – Slovenia

Microclista is a monophyletic clade within the Monolistra genus, with a distribution limited to the area of the Dinaric alps. All species are found in fresh karst-groundwater.

Monolistra Gerstaecker, 1856

- Monolistra caeca Gerstaeker, 1856 - Slovenia, Italy, Croatia
- Monolistra monstruosa Sket, 1970 – Bosnia and Herzegovina

Monolistrella Sket, 1964

- Monolistra velkovrhi Sket, 1960

Pseudomonolistra

- Monolistra bosnica Sket, 1970 – Bosnia and Herzegovina
- Monolistra hercegoviniensis Absolon, 1916 - Bosnia and Herzegovina
- Monolistra radjai Prevorcnik & Sket, 2007

Typhlosphaeroma

- Monolistra bericum (Fabiani, 1901) – Italy, Croatia
- Monolistra boldorii Brian, 1931 – Italy
- Monolistra lavalensis Stoch, 1984 – Italy
- Monolistra matjasici Sket, 1965 – Croatia
- Monolistra pavani Arcangeli, 1942 – Italy, Switzerland
- Monolistra racovitzai Strouhal, 1928 – Slovenia, Croatia
