= Stygobromus barri =

Conservation status
- Vulnerable (IUCN 3.1)

- Imperiled (NatureServe)

Scientific classification
- Kingdom: Animalia
- Phylum: Arthropoda
- Class: Malacostraca
- Order: Amphipoda
- Family: Crangonyctidae
- Genus: Stygobromus
- Species: S. barri

Binomial name
- Stygobromus barri (Holsinger, 1967)

Species of crustacean

Stygobromus barri, commonly called Barr's cave amphipod, is a troglomorphic species of amphipod in family Crangonyctidae. It is endemic to Missouri in the United States.
