= Stygobromus indentatus =

Conservation status
- Vulnerable (IUCN 3.1)

- Vulnerable (NatureServe)

Scientific classification
- Kingdom: Animalia
- Phylum: Arthropoda
- Class: Malacostraca
- Order: Amphipoda
- Family: Crangonyctidae
- Genus: Stygobromus
- Species: S. indentatus

Binomial name
- Stygobromus indentatus (Holsinger, 1967)

Species of crustacean

Stygobromus indentatus, the Tidewater Stygonectid amphipod is a species of crustacean in family Crangonyctidae. It is native to Maryland, North Carolina and Virginia in the United States. Its natural habitat is groundwater aquifers in the Tidewater region.
