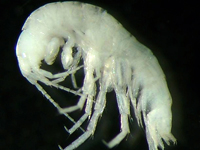
- Stygobromus kenki

Scientific classification
- Kingdom: Animalia
- Phylum: Arthropoda
- Clade: Pancrustacea
- Class: Malacostraca
- Order: Amphipoda
- Family: Crangonyctidae
- Genus: Stygobromus; Cope, 1872

Type species
- Stygobromus vitreus Cope, 1872

= Stygobromus =

Genus of crustaceans

Stygobromus is a genus of amphipod crustaceans that live in subterranean habitats. The majority of the listed species are endemic to North America (one from Canada, the rest from the United States), a smaller number of species are also known from Eurasia. Most of the North American species live in areas which were not covered by the Laurentide Ice Sheet, although a few species seem to have survived under the ice. A number of species are on the IUCN Red List as endangered species (EN) or vulnerable species (VU); one species, S. lucifugus, is extinct.

Stygobromus includes the following species:

- Stygobromus abditus Holsinger, 1978 (Virginia)
- Stygobromus ackerlyi Holsinger, 1978 (Georgia)
- Stygobromus alabamensis (Stout, 1911)
- Stygobromus albapinus Taylor & Holsinger, 2011 (Nevada)
- Stygobromus allegheniensis (Holsinger, 1967) (New York to West Virginia)
- Stygobromus ambulans (F. Müller, 1846)
- Stygobromus amicus Holsinger, 2014
- Stygobromus anastasiae Sidorov, Holsinger & Takhteev, 2010 (Siberia, Russia)
- Stygobromus apscheronia (Derzhavin, 1945) (Azerbaijan)
- Stygobromus araeus (Holsinger, 1969) (Virginia, North Carolina)
- Stygobromus arizonensis Holsinger, 1974 (Arizona)
- Stygobromus bakeri Gibson & Hutchins in Gibson, Hutchins, Krejca, Diaz & Sprouse, 2021
- Stygobromus balconis (Hubricht, 1943) (Texas)
- Stygobromus baroodyi Holsinger, 1978 (Virginia)
- Stygobromus barri (Holsinger, 1967) (Missouri)
- Stygobromus barryi Holsinger, 1978 (Tennessee)
- Stygobromus behningi (Birstein, 1948)
- Stygobromus bifurcatus (Holsinger, 1967) (Texas)
- Stygobromus biggersi Holsinger, 1978 (Virginia to Pennsylvania)
- Stygobromus blinni Wang & Holsinger, 2001
- Stygobromus borealis Holsinger, 1978 (Vermont, New York)
- Stygobromus boultoni Wang & Holsinger, 2001
- Stygobromus bowmani (Holsinger, 1967) (Oklahoma)
- Stygobromus caecilius Holsinger, 2011
- Stygobromus canadensis Holsinger, 1980 (Alberta, Canada)
- Stygobromus carolinensis Holsinger, 1978 (North Carolina)
- Stygobromus chamberlaini Ellis, 1941
- Stygobromus cherylae Wang & Holsinger, 2001
- Stygobromus clantoni (Creaser, 1934) (Kansas, Missouri)
- Stygobromus coeca (Dobraenu & Manolache, 1951)
- Stygobromus coloradensis Ward, 1977
- Stygobromus conradi (Holsinger, 1967) (Virginia)
- Stygobromus cooperi (Holsinger, 1967) (West Virginia)
- Stygobromus cowani Wang & Holsinger, 2001
- Stygobromus culveri Holsinger, 1978 (West Virginia)
- Stygobromus cumberlandus Holsinger, 1978 (Virginia)
- Stygobromus curroae Wang & Holsinger, 2001
- Stygobromus dejectus (Holsinger, 1967) (Texas)
- Stygobromus dentata (Hubricht, 1943)
- Stygobromus dershavini (Behning, 1928)
- Stygobromus dicksoni Holsinger, 1978 (Alabama, Georgia)
- Stygobromus donensis (Martynov, 1919)
- Stygobromus doughertyensis Cannizzaro & Sawicki in Cannizzaro, Balding, Stine & Sawicki, 2019
- Stygobromus duplus Wang & Holsinger, 2001
- Stygobromus elatus (Holsinger, 1967) (Arkansas)
- Stygobromus elliotti Holsinger, 1974
- Stygobromus emarginatus (Hubricht, 1943) (Maryland, West Virginia)
- Stygobromus ephemerus (Holsinger, 1969) (Virginia)
- Stygobromus estesi Holsinger, 1978 (Virginia)
- Stygobromus exilis Hubricht, 1943
- Stygobromus fecundus Holsinger, 1978 (Tennessee)
- Stygobromus felleri Holsinger, 2011
- Stygobromus fergusoni Holsinger, 1978 (Virginia)
- Stygobromus finleyi Holsinger, 1978 (Tennessee)
- Stygobromus flagellatus (J. E. Benedict, 1896) (Texas)
- Stygobromus floridanus Holsinger & Sawicki, 2016
- Stygobromus foliatus Holsinger, 2011
- Stygobromus fontinalis Wang & Holsinger, 2001
- Stygobromus franzi Holsinger, 1978 (Maryland)
- Stygobromus gallawayae Wang & Holsinger, 2001
- Stygobromus glacialis Wang & Holsinger, 2001
- Stygobromus gracilipes (Holsinger, 1967) (Virginia to Pennsylvania)
- Stygobromus gradyi Holsinger, 1974 (California)
- Stygobromus grahami Holsinger, 1974
- Stygobromus grandis Holsinger, 1978 (Georgia)
- Stygobromus hadenoecus (Holsinger, 1966) (Texas)
- Stygobromus harai Holsinger, 1974 (California)
- Stygobromus hayi (Hubricht & Mackin, 1940) (District of Columbia)
- Stygobromus herbsti Wang & Holsinger, 2001
- Stygobromus heteropodus Hubricht, 1943 (Missouri)
- Stygobromus hoffmani Holsinger, 1978 (Virginia)
- Stygobromus holsingeri Ward, 1977
- Stygobromus hubbardi Holsinger, 2009
- Stygobromus hubbsi Shoemaker, 1942 (Oregon)
- Stygobromus hyporheicus Wang & Holsinger, 2001
- Stygobromus hyrcana (Dershavin, 1939)
- Stygobromus idahoensis Wang & Holsinger, 2001
- Stygobromus imperialis Wang & Holsinger, 2001
- Stygobromus indentatus (Holsinger, 1967) (Maryland, North Carolina and Virginia)
- Stygobromus inexpectatus Holsinger, 1978 (Alabama)
- Stygobromus interitus Holsinger, 1978 (Virginia)
- Stygobromus intermedia (Dobreanu, Manolache & Piascariu, 1952)
- Stygobromus interstitialis Wang & Holsinger, 2001
- Stygobromus iowae Hubricht, 1943
- Stygobromus jakutana (Martynov, 1931)
- Stygobromus jemezensis Wang & Holsinger, 2001
- Stygobromus johanseni (Shoemaker, 1920)
- Stygobromus kazakhstanica Kulkina, 1992
- Stygobromus kenki Holsinger, 1978 (District of Columbia, Virginia)
- Stygobromus lacicolus Holsinger, 1974
- Stygobromus lanensis Wang & Holsinger, 2001
- Stygobromus latus Wang & Holsinger, 2001
- Stygobromus leensis Holsinger, 1978 (Virginia)
- Stygobromus lepida (Mateus & Mateus, 1991)
- Stygobromus levanidovae (G. Karaman, 1991)
- Stygobromus limbus Wang & Holsinger, 2001
- Stygobromus longidactylus (S. Karaman, 1929)
- Stygobromus longipes (Holsinger, 1966) (Texas)
- †Stygobromus lucifugus (Hay, 1882) (Illinois)
- Stygobromus mackenziei Holsinger, 1974 (California)
- Stygobromus mackini Hubricht, 1943 (Tennessee to West Virginia)
- Stygobromus meschtscherica (Borutsky, 1929)
- Stygobromus mikhaili Sidorov, Holsinger & Takhteev, 2010 (Siberia, Russia)
- Stygobromus minutus Holsinger, 1978 (Georgia)
- Stygobromus montanensis Holsinger, 1974 (Montana)
- Stygobromus montanus (Holsinger, 1967) (Arkansas)
- Stygobromus morrisoni (Holsinger, 1967) (Virginia, West Virginia)
- Stygobromus mundus (Holsinger, 1967) (Virginia)
- Stygobromus myersae Wang & Holsinger, 2001
- Stygobromus mysticus Holsinger, 1974
- Stygobromus nanus Holsinger, 1978 (West Virginia)
- Stygobromus nortoni (Holsinger, 1969) (Tennessee)
- Stygobromus obrutus Holsinger, 1978 (Virginia)
- Stygobromus obscurus Holsinger, 1974
- Stygobromus onondagaensis (Hubricht & Mackin, 1940) (Arkansas, Kansas, Missouri and Oklahoma)
- Stygobromus oregonensis Holsinger, 1974 (Oregon)
- Stygobromus ozarkensis (Holsinger, 1967) (Arkansas, Missouri and Oklahoma)
- Stygobromus parvus (Holsinger, 1969) (West Virginia)
- Stygobromus paxillus Holsinger, 2011
- Stygobromus pecki (Holsinger, 1967) (Texas)
- Stygobromus pennaki Ward, 1977
- Stygobromus philareti (Birstein, 1948)
- Stygobromus phreaticus Holsinger, 1978 (Virginia)
- Stygobromus pizzinii (Shoemaker, 1938) (District of Columbia, Maryland, Pennsylvania and Virginia)
- Stygobromus pollostus Holsinger, 1978 (Virginia)
- Stygobromus pseudospinosus Holsinger, 1978 (Virginia)
- Stygobromus putealis (Holmes, 1909) (Wisconsin)
- Stygobromus puteanus Holsinger, 1974
- Stygobromus quatsinensis Holsinger & Shaw, 1987
- Stygobromus rallus Wang & Holsinger, 2001
- Stygobromus redactus Holsinger, 1978 (West Virginia)
- Stygobromus reddelli (Holsinger, 1966) (Texas)
- Stygobromus rudolphi Wang & Holsinger, 2001
- Stygobromus russelli (Holsinger, 1967) (Texas)
- Stygobromus saltuaris Wang & Holsinger, 2001
- Stygobromus secundus Bousfield & Holsinger, 1981
- Stygobromus sheldoni Holsinger, 1974
- Stygobromus sierrensis Holsinger, 1974
- Stygobromus simplex Wang & Holsinger, 2001
- Stygobromus smithi Hubricht, 1943 (Alabama)
- Stygobromus sparsus Holsinger, 1978 (Tennessee)
- Stygobromus spinatus (Holsinger, 1967) (West Virginia)
- Stygobromus spinosus (Hubricht & Mackin, 1940) (Virginia)
- Stygobromus stegerorum Holsinger, 1978 (Virginia)
- Stygobromus stellmacki (Holsinger, 1967) (Pennsylvania)
- Stygobromus subtilis (Hubricht, 1943) (Illinois, Michigan and Missouri)
- Stygobromus tahoensis Holsinger, 1974
- Stygobromus tenuis (S. I. Smith, 1874) (Connecticut to Maryland)
- Stygobromus trinus Wang & Holsinger, 2001
- Stygobromus tritus Holsinger, 1974
- Stygobromus urospinatus Wang & Holsinger, 2001
- Stygobromus utahensis Wang & Holsinger, 2001 (Utah)
- Stygobromus vitreus Cope, 1872
- Stygobromus wahkeenensis Wang & Holsinger, 2001
- Stygobromus wardi Wang & Holsinger, 2001
- Stygobromus wengerorum Holsinger, 1974 (California)
