= Niphargobates =

Scientific classification
- Kingdom: Animalia
- Phylum: Arthropoda
- Class: Malacostraca
- Order: Amphipoda
- Family: Niphargidae
- Genus: Niphargobates; Sket, 1981

Species
- Niphargobates lefkodemonaki Sket, 1990; Niphargobates orophobata Sket, 1981

Genus of crustaceans

Niphargobates is a genus of amphipod crustaceans containing two species from European caves. Niphargobates lefkodemonaki is only known to occur in a cave near Xyloskalo in the Lefka Ori mountains, Crete, Greece. Niphargobates orophobata is only known to occur in caves near Postojna, Slovenia. Both species are listed as vulnerable on the IUCN Red List.
