= Hyperothrix =

Conservation status
- Vulnerable (IUCN 3.1)

Scientific classification
- Kingdom: Animalia
- Phylum: Arthropoda
- Class: Diplopoda
- Order: Polydesmida
- Family: Pyrgodesmidae
- Genus: Hyperothrix Attems, 1900
- Species: H. orophura

Binomial name
- Hyperothrix orophura (Attems, 1900)

Species of millipede

Hyperothrix orophura is a species of millipede in the family Pyrgodesmidae. The species is endemic to Mahe Island and Silhouette Island of Seychelles. It is the only species in the genus Hyperothrix.
