= Arcopotamonautes gerdalensis =

Conservation status
- Vulnerable (IUCN 3.1)

Scientific classification
- Kingdom: Animalia
- Phylum: Arthropoda
- Class: Malacostraca
- Order: Decapoda
- Suborder: Pleocyemata
- Infraorder: Brachyura
- Family: Potamonautidae
- Genus: Arcopotamonautes
- Species: A. gerdalensis

Binomial name
- Arcopotamonautes gerdalensis (Bott, 1955)

Species of crab

Arcopotamonautes gerdalensis is a species of crab in the family Potamonautidae. It is found in the Democratic Republic of the Congo, Kenya, Tanzania, and Uganda. Its natural habitats are rivers and freshwater lakes. It is threatened by habitat loss.
