= Arcopotamonautes unisulcatus =

Conservation status
- Vulnerable (IUCN 3.1)

Scientific classification
- Kingdom: Animalia
- Phylum: Arthropoda
- Class: Malacostraca
- Order: Decapoda
- Suborder: Pleocyemata
- Infraorder: Brachyura
- Family: Potamonautidae
- Genus: Arcopotamonautes
- Species: A. unisulcatus

Binomial name
- Arcopotamonautes unisulcatus Rathbun, 1933

Species of crab

Arcopotamonautes unisulcatus is a species of crab in the family Potamonautidae. It is only found in the Uluguru Mountains, Tanzania.
