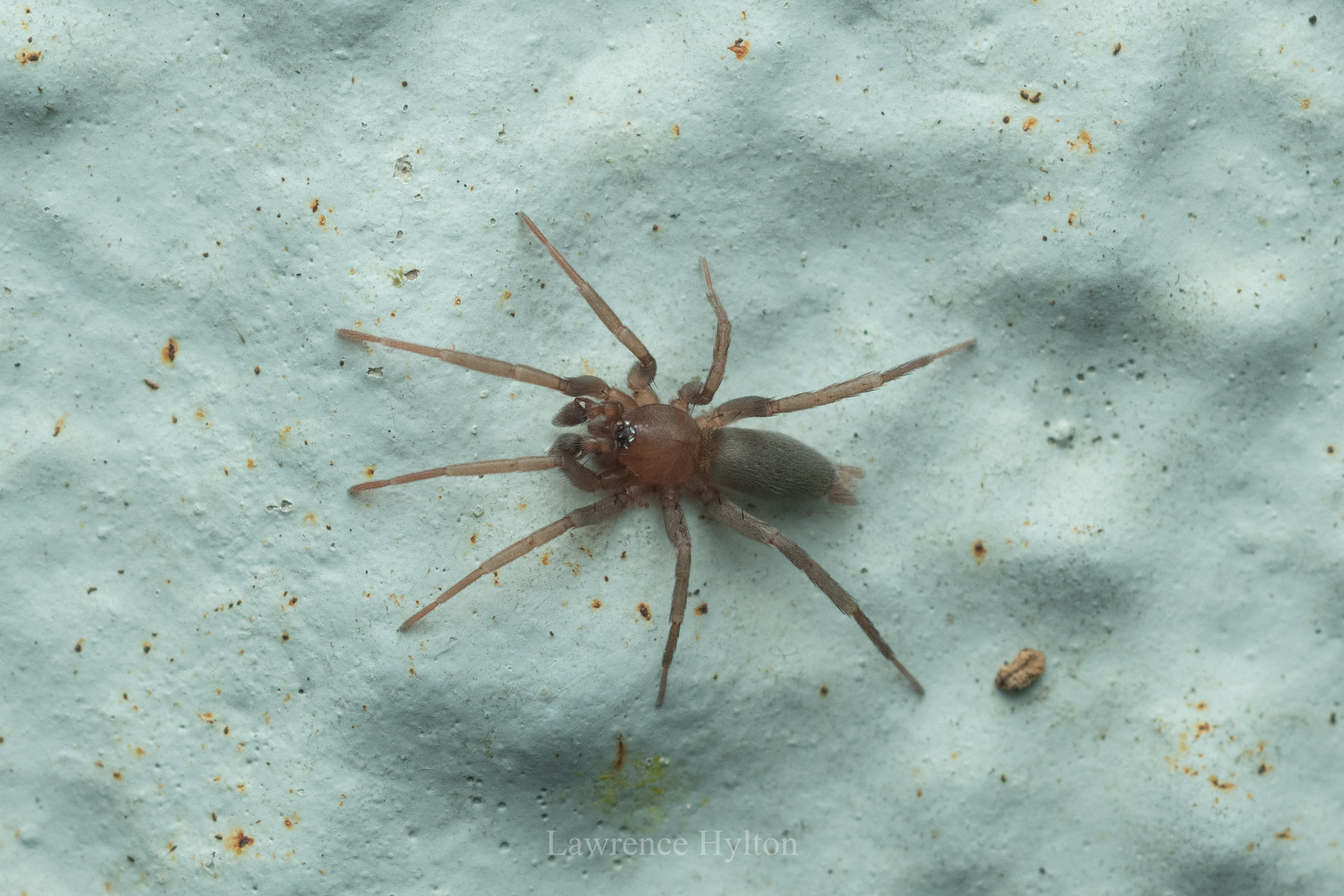
- Hongkongia sp. from Hong Kong

Scientific classification
- Kingdom: Animalia
- Phylum: Arthropoda
- Subphylum: Chelicerata
- Class: Arachnida
- Order: Araneae
- Infraorder: Araneomorphae
- Family: Gnaphosidae
- Genus: Hongkongia; Song & Zhu, 1998

Type species
- Hongkongia wuae Song & Zhu, 1998

Species
- 7, see text

= Hongkongia =

Genus of spiders

Hongkongia is a genus of ground spiders that was first described by D. X. Song & Ming-Sheng Zhu in 1998.

== Distribution ==
Spiders in this genus are found in Asia from India to the Philippines and Indonesia, with one described species endemic to West Africa.

== Etymology ==
The genus is named after Hong Kong. See the taxonomy section for details.

== Taxonomy ==
Originally, specimens collected in 1995 by Ms. Wu of Hong Kong were designated as the type species Hongkongia wuae. In 2024, this species was found to be the same as the previously described species Geodrassus ellenae Barrion & Litsinger, 1995 with a distribution from China to Sulawesi and the Philippines. Hence G. ellenae was moved to genus Hongkongia and is now the type species by synonymy.

In 2019, Marusik and Omelko moved the West African species Echemus incinctus Simon, 1907 to this genus based on the structure of the male palp.

The genus Hongkongia was revised in 2009, describing a new species endemic to Taiwan, which the authors found to be very similar to H. reptrix Deeleman-Reinhold, 2001. They concluded that the genus is close to Megamyrmaekion Wider, 1834.

== Species ==
As of October 2025, this genus includes seven species:

- Hongkongia caeca Deeleman-Reinhold, 2001 – Indonesia (Moluccas)
- Hongkongia ellenae (Barrion & Litsinger, 1995) – China, Indonesia (Sulawesi), Philippines
- Hongkongia incincta (Simon, 1907) – Ivory Coast, Guinea-Bissau
- Hongkongia liutang Lin & Li, 2023 – China
- Hongkongia novia Sankaran & Tripathi, 2023 – India
- Hongkongia reptrix Deeleman-Reinhold, 2001 – Japan, China, Indonesia (Borneo, Java, Bali)
- Hongkongia songi Zhang, Zhu & Tso, 2009 – Taiwan
