= Canthocamptus sublaevis =

Conservation status
- Vulnerable (IUCN 2.3)

Scientific classification
- Kingdom: Animalia
- Phylum: Arthropoda
- Clade: Pancrustacea
- Class: Copepoda
- Order: Harpacticoida
- Family: Canthocamptidae
- Genus: Canthocamptus
- Species: C. sublaevis

Binomial name
- Canthocamptus sublaevis Hamond, 1987

Species of crustacean

Canthocamptus sublaevis is a species of harpacticoid copepod in the family Canthocamptidae, first described by Richard Hamond in 1987.

It is found in Australia.

The IUCN conservation status of Canthocamptus sublaevis is "VU", vulnerable. The species faces a high risk of endangerment in the medium term. The IUCN status was reviewed in 1996.
