= Stoda =

Scientific classification
- Kingdom: Animalia
- Phylum: Arthropoda
- Subphylum: Chelicerata
- Class: Arachnida
- Order: Araneae
- Infraorder: Araneomorphae
- Family: Theridiidae
- Genus: Stoda; Saaristo, 2006
- Species: S. libudum

Binomial name
- Stoda libudum (Roberts, 1978)

Monotypic genus of spiders

Stoda is a monotypic genus of African comb-footed spiders containing the single species, Stoda libudum. It was first described by Michael I. Saaristo in 2006, and is found on the Seychelles.
