= Monolistra schottlaenderi =

Conservation status
- Vulnerable (IUCN 2.3)

Scientific classification
- Kingdom: Animalia
- Phylum: Arthropoda
- Class: Malacostraca
- Order: Isopoda
- Family: Sphaeromatidae
- Genus: Monolistra
- Species: M. schottlaenderi

Binomial name
- Monolistra schottlaenderi Stammer, 1930

Species of crustacean

Monolistra schottlaenderi is a species of isopod in the family Sphaeromatidae.

The IUCN conservation status of Monolistra schottlaenderi is "VU", vulnerable. The species faces a high risk of endangerment in the medium term. The IUCN status was reviewed in 1996.
