= Attheyella longipes =

Conservation status
- Vulnerable (IUCN 2.3)

Scientific classification
- Kingdom: Animalia
- Phylum: Arthropoda
- Class: Copepoda
- Order: Harpacticoida
- Family: Canthocamptidae
- Genus: Attheyella
- Species: A. longipes

Binomial name
- Attheyella longipes (Hamond, 1987)

Synonyms
- Canthocamptus longipes Hamond, 1987; Attheyella (Chappuisiella) longipes (Hamond, 1987)

Species of crustacean

Attheyella longipes is a species of crustacean in the family Canthocamptidae. It is endemic to Australia.
