= Arcopotamonautes raybouldi =

Conservation status
- Vulnerable (IUCN 3.1)

Scientific classification
- Kingdom: Animalia
- Phylum: Arthropoda
- Class: Malacostraca
- Order: Decapoda
- Suborder: Pleocyemata
- Infraorder: Brachyura
- Family: Potamonautidae
- Genus: Arcopotamonautes
- Species: A. raybouldi

Binomial name
- Arcopotamonautes raybouldi Cumberlidge & Vannini, 2004

Species of crab

Arcopotamonautes raybouldi is a species of freshwater crab. It lives in water-filled tree holes in forests in the eastern Usambara Mountains of Tanzania and the Shimba Hills in Kenya. It is threatened by deforestation resulting from the expansion of the human population, and is listed as a vulnerable species on the IUCN Red List. The species was described in 2004, and named after Professor John N. Raybould of the University of Bristol, who collected the first specimens of the species.
