= Phreatobite =

Phreatobites are animals living within the phreatic zone of groundwater aquifers. They are usually isopod or amphipod crustaceans such as species of Stygobromus, though there is also a genus of snails (Phreatodrobia) and Phreatobius are a genus of catfish living within flooded leaf litter. Alternative descriptions for such animals include stygobite, troglobite or Interstitial animals, as they live in water between the particles of the flooded substrate. They usually exhibit troglomorphism, with a loss of colour and eyesight, like the familiar blind cavefish which may also be referred to as 'phreatic fish'. Such animals can often be found in wells, where human pursuit of water has dug down into their habitat.
