= Orconectes incomptus =

Conservation status
- Vulnerable (IUCN 3.1)

- Imperiled (NatureServe)

Scientific classification
- Kingdom: Animalia
- Phylum: Arthropoda
- Class: Malacostraca
- Order: Decapoda
- Suborder: Pleocyemata
- Family: Cambaridae
- Genus: Orconectes
- Species: O. incomptus

Binomial name
- Orconectes incomptus Hobbs & Barr, 1972

Species of crayfish

Orconectes incomptus is a species of crayfish in the family Cambaridae. It is endemic to Tennessee. It is also known as the Tennessee cave crayfish.
