= Procambarus cavernicola =

Conservation status
- Vulnerable (IUCN 3.1)

Scientific classification
- Kingdom: Animalia
- Phylum: Arthropoda
- Class: Malacostraca
- Order: Decapoda
- Suborder: Pleocyemata
- Family: Cambaridae
- Genus: Procambarus
- Species: P. cavernicola

Binomial name
- Procambarus cavernicola Mejía-Ortíz, Hartnoll & Viccon-Pale, 2003

Species of crayfish

Procambarus cavernicola, the Gabriel cave crayfish, is a freshwater crayfish endemic to Oaxaca in Mexico. It is a cave-dwelling species known from only one cave, Gabriel Cave in the Mojarra Hill, near Buenos Aires.
