= Leslie Hubricht =

American malacologist (1908–2005)

- Born: Leslie Hubricht; January 11, 1908; Los Angeles, California, United States
- Died: September 16, 2005 (aged 97); Meridian, Mississippi, United States
- Scientific career
- Fields: Malacology

Leslie Hubricht was an American biologist and malacologist.

== Career ==
Professionally, Leslie Hubricht worked as an assistant at the Missouri Botanical Gardens from 1936 to 1943, then, until 1973, he was employed by Remington Rand as a tabulating machine mechanic and as a UNIVAC repairman. Much of his time, however, was devoted to one or another aspect of natural history, including plants, cave life, and amphipods and isopods.

He was devoted to the study of the terrestrial mollusks of the eastern United States, a field in which he was termed a "world authority" by Alan Solem (then Curator of Invertebrates at the Field Museum of Natural History in Chicago). The museum's purchase of his collection in 1990 was instrumental in its development of a world-class terrestrial mollusk collection.

Hubricht had 3 kinds of plants and 26 kinds of animals named in his honor. Hubricht himself named 81 kinds of land snails from the eastern United States. His list of scientific publications contains 147 entries.

== Life History ==
Hubricht's formal education ended after one semester of high school;

== Selected publications ==
- Hubricht L. & Mackin J.G. 1940. Descriptions of 9 new species of freshwater amphipod crustaceans, with notes and new localities for other species. American Midland Naturalist, 23: 187–218.
- Hubricht L. & Ralph O. Erickson. 1941. Another method for recording localities from topographical maps. Science 93(2412): 288.
- Pilsbry, H. A. & Hubricht L. 1956. Beach drift Polygyridae from southern Texas. Nautilus 69: 93–96.
- Hubricht L. 1964. Land Snails from the Caves of Kentucky, Tennessee and Alabama. Bulletin of the National Speleological Society. 26(1): 33–36.
- Hubricht L. 1985. The distributions of the native land mollusks of the Eastern United States. Fieldiana: Zoology New Ser: 24. 191 pp.
