= Troglomorphism =

Adaptation of animals to constant darkness

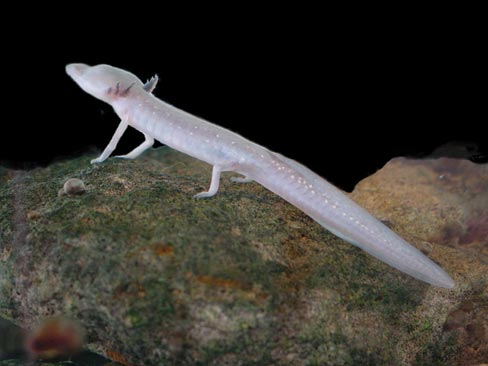
Texas cave salamander

Troglomorphism is the morphological adaptation of an animal to life in the constant darkness of caves, characterised by features such as loss of pigment, reduced eyesight or blindness, and attenuated bodies or appendages. Several terms are used to describe troglomorphic animals, namely troglobitic, stygobitic or stygofauna, troglofauna, hypogean, or hypogeic.

Troglomorphism occurs in several animal species, with examples among molluscs, velvet worms, arthropods, fish, amphibians (notably cave salamanders), and reptiles. To date there are no examples of troglomorphic mammals or birds. Pickerel frogs are not considered to be part of this category due to their classification as trogloxenes or possibly troglophiles. The first Troglobiont to be described was Leptodirus hochenwartii.

== Morphology ==
Troglomorphic species are those which have adapted to the characteristics of subterranean life, such as continual darkness, reduced seasonal periods, and limited food availability. Many troglomorphs exhibit sensory adaptations such as elongated antennae, which allow them to navigate their habitat, while having reduced vision and pigmentation, in what are generally considered to be evolutionary tradeoffs. Due to limited food sources, these species also tend to exhibit a low metabolic rate and low activity rate to efficiently use their energy.

While general trends are common among troglomorphic species, the traits of individual species can be highly variable. For example, in species like the Mexican tetra, some populations retain their eyes while others tend towards eye loss, and can interbreed with one another. Some Mexican tetra retain pigmentation, although its function is not well understood. Other species, like the cave amphipod, have subterranean and surface populations retaining a species relationship, adding to the complexity in understanding this unique evolutionary phenomenon.

== Mechanisms ==
Changes in this troglomorphic morphology directly affect the expression of genetic traits, particularly optical genes. This occurs in species such as the Mexican tetra; expression of the pax6 gene, which strengthens many eye-associated genes during development, is strongly suppressed by other genetic signals. A current theory holds that beneficial traits are often linked negatively to the genes underlying them, resulting in a double positive for cave dwellers that would otherwise be selected against in surface populations.

These genetic linkages may explain the loss of otherwise seemingly unrelated traits, such as scales or pigmentation, in some species. Some of these trait losses or gains may be due to their links with evolutionarily selected genes, rather than any inherent evolutionary benefit to the organism. For example, if a lack of eyes and a lack of scales are linked in the genome, eyelessness may consequently result in scaleless organisms, even without additional benefit. Alternatively, the absence of such genome linkages may explain why some species adapt to cave life without the loss of traits like eyes and pigment.

A 2012 study by the National University of Singapore found that freshwater cave crabs exhibited reductive evolutionary changes at the same rate as constructive changes. Their research concluded that both selection and evolution are factors toward advancing reductive changes (e.g. smaller eyes) and constructive changes (e.g. larger claws), thereby subjecting troglomorphic adaptations to strong forces that shape an organism's morphology.

== Caves as evolutionary "dead ends" ==
One point of contention among researchers of troglomorphism is the long-term evolutionary benefit of adaptation to cave life. Scientists have debated whether adaptation to cave life will ultimately lead to evolutionary stagnation, limiting the potential future diversification of species. The whip spider genus Paracharon is cited as evidence that species can maintain aspects of their genetic ancestry. The coelacanth is another (non-cave-dwelling) example of long-term genetic similarity.

Some researchers suggest that low variation in genetic diversity may actually serve as an advantage to cave dwelling species. Due to the relatively stable nature of caves, some species have been suggested to have endured periods of climatic instability, such as the Pleistocene, before re-adapting to surface life when conditions are favourable. This would suggest that caves are highly influential in the persistence of species and the preservation of biodiversity. In fact, many of these lineages show similar rates of speciation and diversity even within these smaller habitats, as uniquely specialised colonists of another environmental niche, rather than an evolutionary trap.

== See also ==
- List of troglobites
