= Crangonyctidae =

Scientific classification
- Kingdom: Animalia
- Phylum: Arthropoda
- Clade: Pancrustacea
- Class: Malacostraca
- Order: Amphipoda
- Superfamily: Crangonyctoidea
- Family: Crangonyctidae; Bousfield, 1973

Genera
- See text

Family of crustaceans

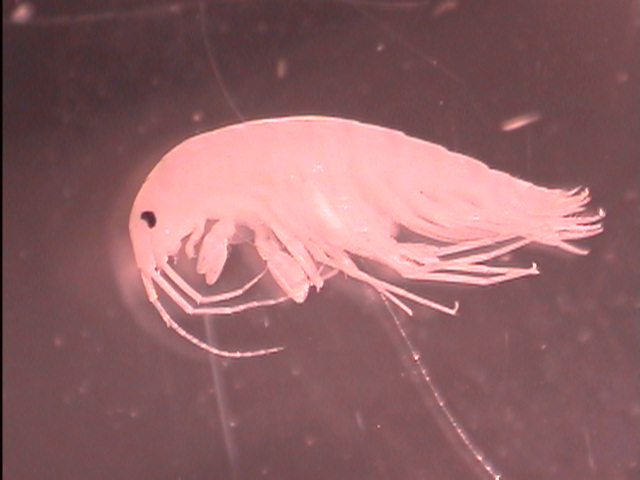

Crangonyctidae is a family of cave-dwelling freshwater amphipod crustaceans. It contains the following genera:

- Amurocrangonyx Sidorov & Holsinger, 2007
- Bactrurus Hay, 1902
- Crangonyx Bate, 1859
- Lyurella Derzhavin, 1939
- † Palaeogammarus Zaddach, 1864
- Stygobromus Cope, 1872
- Stygonyx Bousfield & Holsinger, 1989
