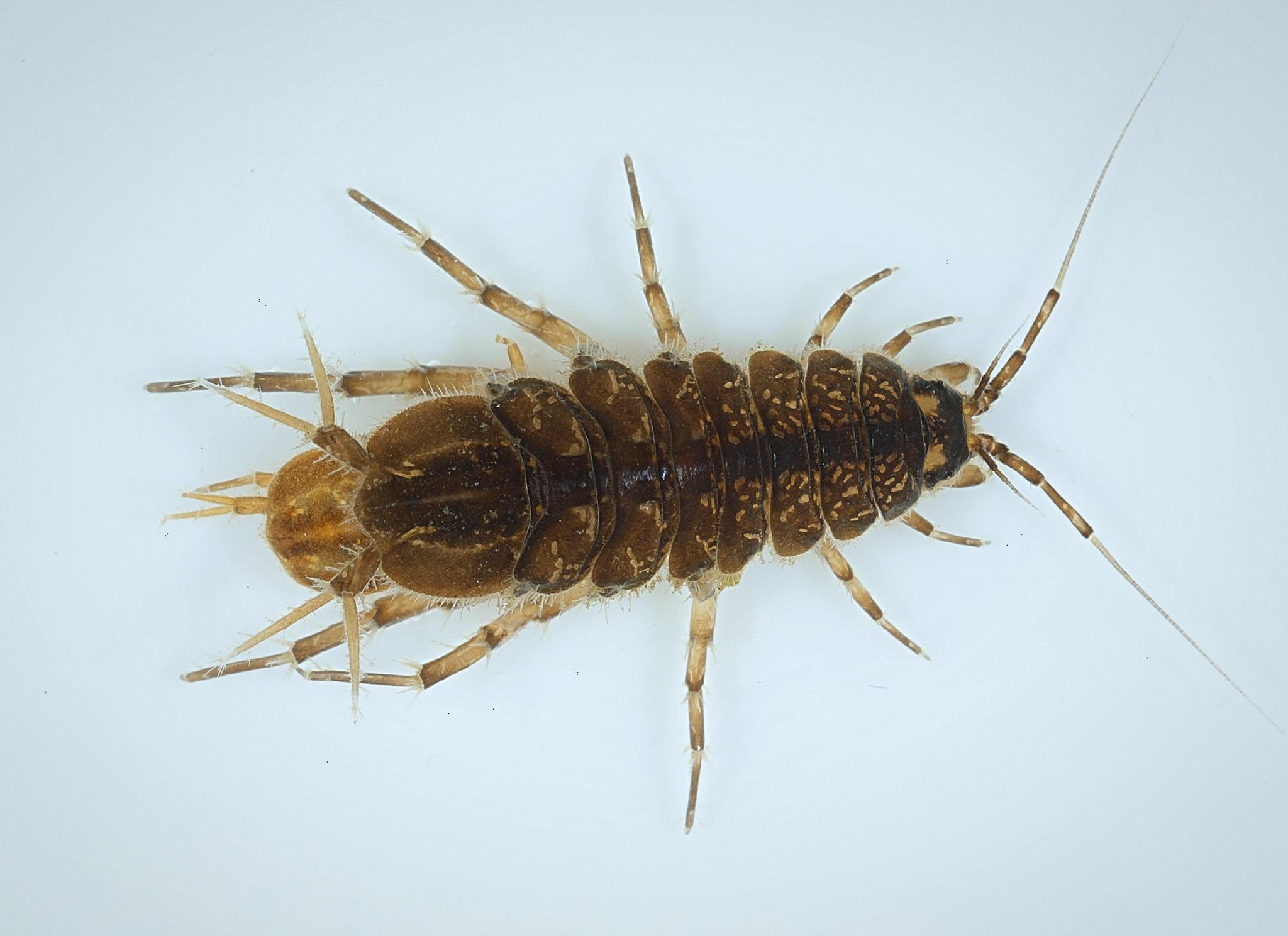
- Asellus aquaticus

Scientific classification
- Kingdom: Animalia
- Phylum: Arthropoda
- Clade: Pancrustacea
- Class: Malacostraca
- Order: Isopoda
- Family: Asellidae
- Genus: Asellus; Geoffroy, 1762

Type species
- Oniscus aquaticus Linnaeus, 1758

= Asellus =

Genus of crustaceans

Asellus is a genus of freshwater isopod crustaceans in the family Asellidae. Species of the genus are native to Europe, Asia and Alaska. Members of the genus are commonly called waterlouse or waterslaters, among other names. They are found in canals, lakes, ponds, and other slow-moving water environments.

== Species ==
Asellus is divided into three subgenera which contain the following species: (Note: A binomial authority in parentheses indicates that the species was originally described in a genus other than Asellus.)

=== Asellus (Asellus) Geoffroy, 1762 ===
- Asellus amamiensis Matsumoto, 1961
- Asellus aquaticus (Linnaeus, 1758)
- Asellus balcanicus Karaman, 1952
- Asellus epimeralis Birstein, 1947
- Asellus ezoensis Matsumoto, 1962
- Asellus hyugaensis Matsumoto, 1960
- Asellus ismailsezarii Malek-Hosseini, Jugovic, Fatemi & Douady, 2022
- Asellus kosswigi Verovnik, Prevorcnik & Jugovic, 2009
- Asellus kumaensis Matsumoto, 1960
- Asellus levanidovorum Henry & Magniez, 1995
- Asellus monticola Birstein, 1932
- Asellus musashiensis Matsumoto, 1961
- Asellus primoryensis Henry & Magniez, 1993
- Asellus shikokuensis Matsumoto, 1960
- Asellus tamaensis Matsumoto, 1960
- Asellus turanaicus Sidorov & Prevorčnik, 2016
- Asellus hilgendorfii Bovallius, 1886

=== Asellus (Arctasellus) Henry & Magniez, 1995 ===
- Asellus alaskensis Bowman & Holmquist, 1975
- Asellus birsteini Levanidov, 1976
- Asellus latifrons Birstein, 1947

=== Asellus (Mesoasellus) Birstein, 1939 ===
- Asellus dybowskii Semenkevich, 1924

=== Phylogeny ===
After Saclier et al. 2025:

- Asellidae
  - Salmasellus
  - - - Asellus
      - - Mesoasellus
        - Limnoasellus
    - - - Baicalasellus
        - - Pseudobaicalasellus
          - - - Gallaseullus
              - Conasellus
            - - Caecidotea
              - Lirceus
      - - Proasellus
        - - Synasellus
          - Bragasellus
