= Proasellus meridianus =

Scientific classification
- Kingdom: Animalia
- Phylum: Arthropoda
- Clade: Pancrustacea
- Class: Malacostraca
- Order: Isopoda
- Family: Asellidae
- Genus: Proasellus
- Species: P. meridianus

Binomial name
- Proasellus meridianus (Emil Racoviță, 1919)

Species of crustacean

Proasellus meridianus is a freshwater crustacean resembling a woodlouse. Its common names include one-spotted waterlouse and one-spotted water-slater.

== Ecology ==
Proasellus meridianus is common throughout the British Isles but less frequently recorded than the very similar Asellus aquaticus from which it can be distinguished by the continuous pale band along the posterior margin of the head. Its range includes France and Belgium from which the type species was described.

Like A. aquaticus, it can be found in rivers, streams and standing water but is less commonly found in garden ponds. It is also much less tolerant to pollution.
