= Bragasellus lagarioides =

Scientific classification
- Kingdom: Animalia
- Phylum: Arthropoda
- Class: Malacostraca
- Order: Isopoda
- Family: Asellidae
- Genus: Bragasellus
- Species: B. lagarioides

Binomial name
- Bragasellus lagarioides Henry & Magniez, 1996

Species of crustacean

Bragasellus lagarioides is a species of crustacean in the family Asellidae. It is endemic to Spain.
