= Bragasellus pauloae =

Scientific classification
- Kingdom: Animalia
- Phylum: Arthropoda
- Class: Malacostraca
- Order: Isopoda
- Family: Asellidae
- Genus: Bragasellus
- Species: B. pauloae

Binomial name
- Bragasellus pauloae (Braga, 1958)

Synonyms
- Asellus pauloae Braga, 1958

Species of crustacean

Bragasellus pauloae is a species of crustacean in the family Asellidae. It is endemic to Portugal.
