= Lirceus usdagalun =

Conservation status
- Critically Imperiled (NatureServe)

- Endangered (ESA)

Scientific classification
- Kingdom: Animalia
- Phylum: Arthropoda
- Class: Malacostraca
- Order: Isopoda
- Family: Asellidae
- Genus: Lirceus
- Species: L. usdagalun

Binomial name
- Lirceus usdagalun Holsinger and Bowman, 1973

Species of crustacean

Lirceus usdagalun is a rare species of crustacean known by the common name Lee County cave isopod. It is endemic to Virginia in the United States, where it is known from a single network of karst cave systems in Lee County. It is threatened by a number of processes. It is a federally listed endangered species of the United States, and is assessed as "endangered" by the International Union for Conservation of Nature.

This isopod is a troglobite, an organism that spends its entire life in caves. It is roughly 7 millimeters long. It lacks eyes and pigmentation. It is flattened and has seven pairs of appendages. The species name, usdagalun, is from a Cherokee word meaning "cave" or "hole under rock".

This organism is endemic to The Cedars, a cave region in the Powell River Valley of southwestern corner of Virginia. It is known from four cave systems. When it was listed as an endangered species, only two populations were known, one of which was thought to have been extirpated by pollution from sawmill sawdust. This population has since re-established itself in the cave after abatement of the pollution. The isopod is sensitive to changes in water quality.

The isopod lives underwater on rocks and gravel in caves. It is associated with other cave organisms, including the isopod Caecidotea recurvata, the amphipod Crangonyx antennatus, snails (genus Fontigens), and planarians (genus Sphalloplana). At least 33 rare species of animals and plants are found at The Cedars.
