= Caecidotea alabamensis =

Conservation status
- Vulnerable (NatureServe)

Scientific classification
- Kingdom: Animalia
- Phylum: Arthropoda
- Class: Malacostraca
- Order: Isopoda
- Family: Asellidae
- Genus: Caecidotea
- Species: C. alabamensis

Binomial name
- Caecidotea alabamensis Stafford, 1911

Species of crustacean

Caecidotea alabamensis is a species of a freshwater crustacean in the family Asellidae. It is endemic to Eastern United States.
