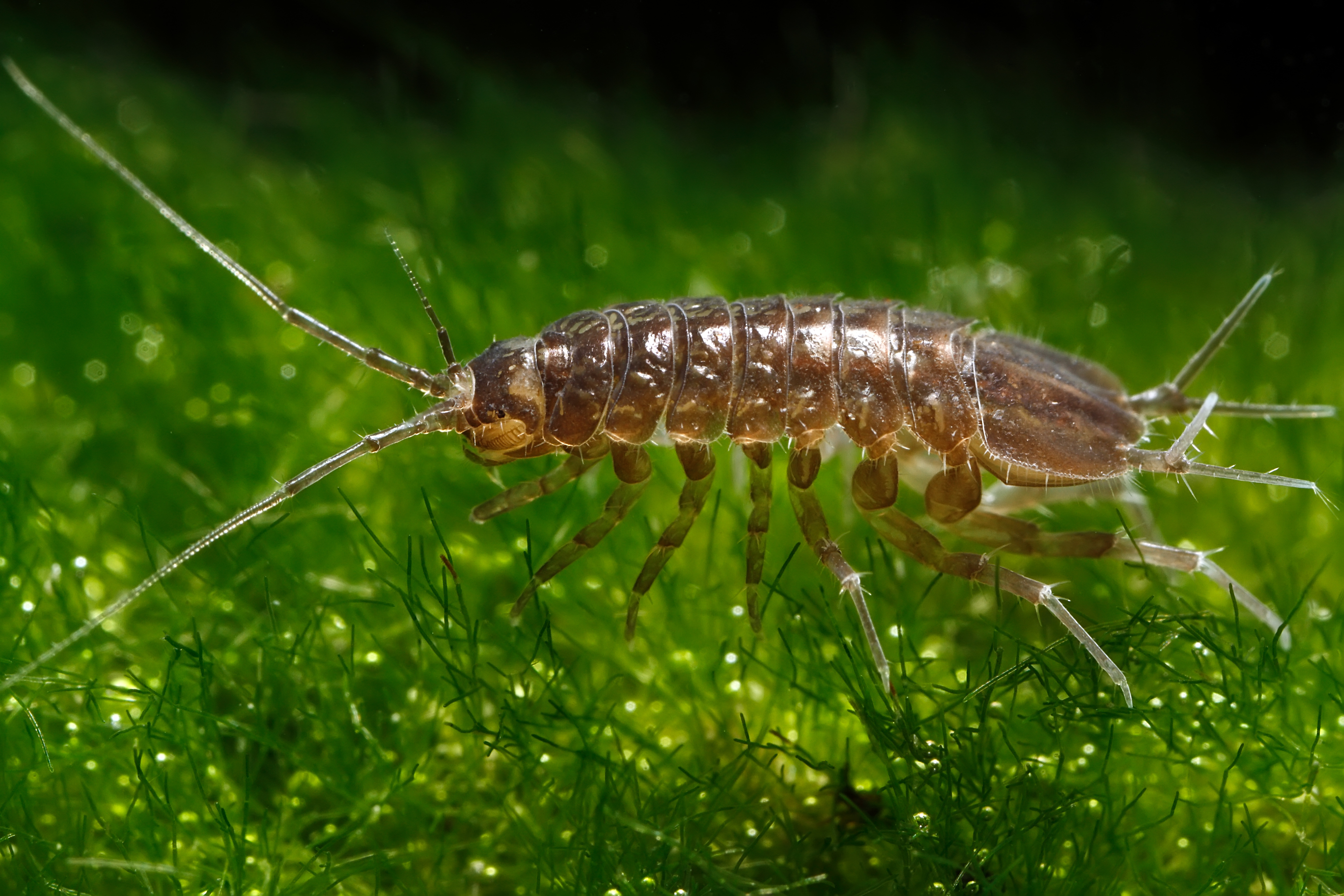

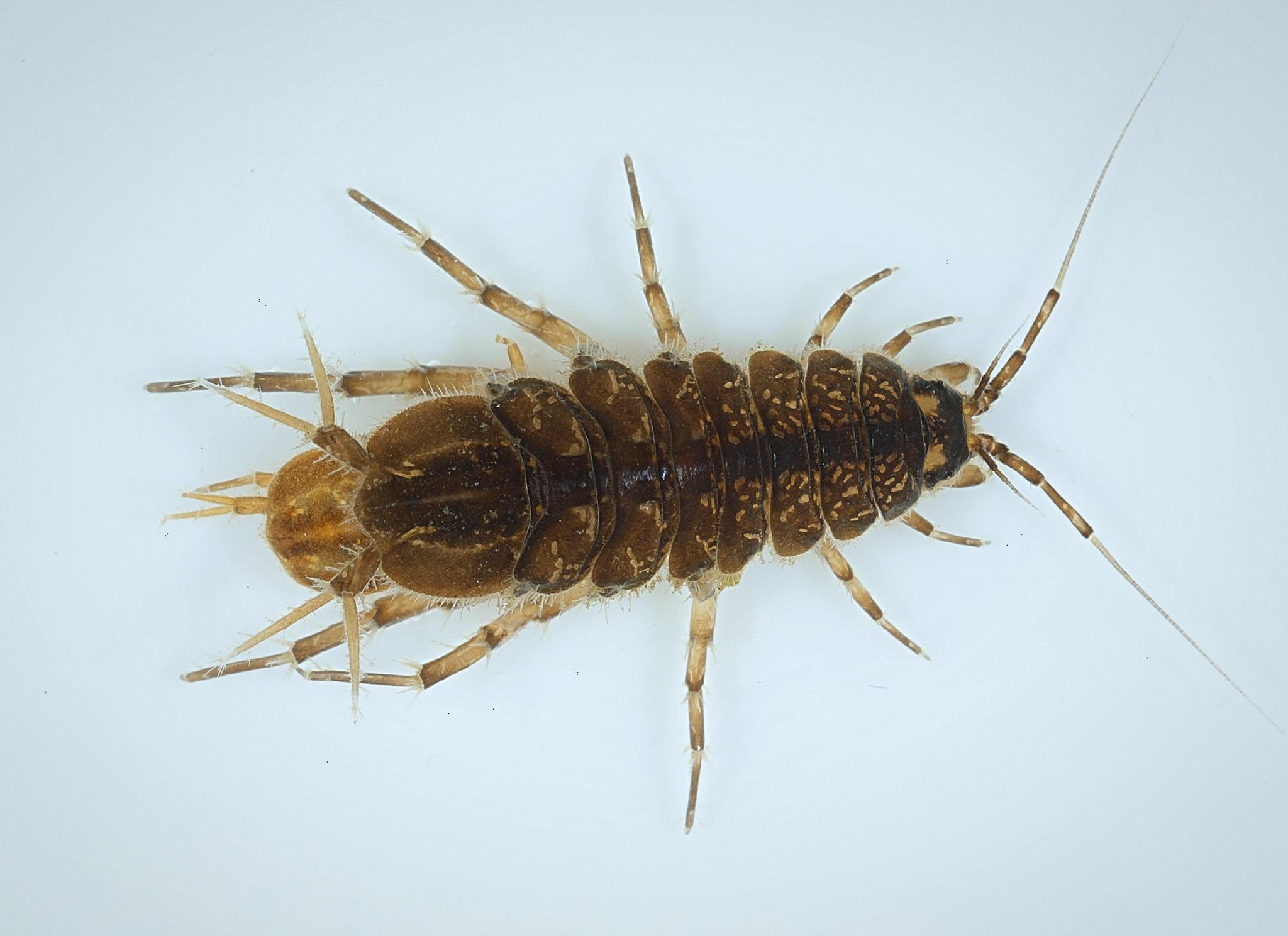

Scientific classification
- Kingdom: Animalia
- Phylum: Arthropoda
- Clade: Pancrustacea
- Class: Malacostraca
- Order: Isopoda
- Family: Asellidae
- Genus: Asellus
- Species: A. aquaticus

Binomial name
- Asellus aquaticus (Linnaeus, 1758)

Synonyms
- Oniscus aquaticus Linnaeus, 1758

= Asellus aquaticus =

Species of crustacean

Asellus aquaticus is a freshwater isopod crustacean native to Europe and surrounding areas, resembling and related to woodlice. It is known by various common names including pond slater, water louse, aquatic sowbug, water hoglouse and cress bug.

== Description ==
Asellus aquaticus is distinguished from the sympatric fellow asselid Proasellus meridianus, to which it closely resembles, by typically having two white spots on the back of the head, rather than a continuous single white spot at the back of the head as found in P. meridianus. It is also distinguished by its larger body size, reaching a length of up to 2 centimetres (0.79 in), as opposed to around 8–10 millimetres (0.31–0.39 in) in Proasellus species, though many mature A. aquaticus specimens are half or less of this length. Males of the species tend to be larger than females, and the species may overall be smaller in more polluted waters as well as warmer climates.

The body is generally around or slightly less than three times as long as wide. The head bears two pairs of antennae, one of which is around 27–31% of the body length in males and 24–29% in females, made up of 3 basal peduncular segments followed by 10-13 short flagellate segments, while the larger one is about as long as the body itself, and made up of 6 pendulcar segments at the base, followed by 82 short flagellate segments in males and 61-71 flagellate segments in females. Both pairs of antennae bear setae (hair or bristle-like structures). The black pigmented eyes are each composed of three ommatidia. Like other crustaceans, the head bears pairs of mandibles, maxillae and maxillulae used to process food. The main body is made up of seven pereonite segments, the sides of which are fringed with both long and short setae. The first three pereonites have distinctly convex rounded sides, while the remaining posterior segments have more straight but still rounded edges. Along the body run seven pairs of pereopod and 5 pairs of pleopod limbs. The first and fourth pairs of pereopod limbs serve for grasping (with the first one being claw-like/subchelate), while the other pereopod limbs serve for walking (ambulatory). The body ends with a rounded, slightly (~1.2x) wider than long pleotelson, the outer edges of which also bear setae. Behind the pleotelson projects a pair of forked uropods, which are around a third of the total body length and are covered in setae.

== Ecology ==
Asellus aquaticus is common throughout Europe, extending from Britain, Ireland and France and the Iberian Peninsula in the west, southwards to southern Spain, Italy, Greece and Turkey, eastwards into western Russia, and northwards to Scandinavia, including Norway, Sweden and Finland. It is found in rivers, streams and standing water, particularly where there are plenty of stones under which it hides, but it is not found where the water is strongly acidic. It is a detritivore, with a diet including fungi, algae, and leaves, including aquatic plant shoots.

Asellus aquaticus is relatively tolerant of a range of pollutants and has been used as an indicator of water quality.

== Life cycle and reproduction ==
Asellus aquaticus can breed throughout the year, if the temperature is high enough: they do not breed under cold temperatures. Maturity can be reached in few months under warm summer temperatures, but maturation may take as much as two years in permanently cold water bodies (e.g., high-latitude or mountain waters). There may be several generations in a single year. Breeding males and females are generally larger than the population average, though the size of breeding males and females progressively declines throughout the breeding season, as larger individuals tend to die earlier. Once a male has found a mature female, he often holds her for 6–8 days to guard her, as females of the species only copulate and enable the males to fertilize their eggs for a brief window of only 24 hours or less around time they moult. This guarding behaviour is more common in large males than smaller ones. Larger males will sometimes attempt to displace smaller males who are guarding females. Females carry eggs in brood pouches underneath their body. Large females have a larger number of eggs, though their individual eggs are the same size as those of smaller females.

Life span varies depending on region: from 9 months in Southern Europe to 20 months in Northern Europe.

== Aquarium keeping ==
Aquarists worldwide are showing increasing interest towards A. aquaticus as a low-maintenance freshwater aquarium pet and tank cleaner. While often sold as live food for other fish, some keepers in the US and Germany have started selectively breeding A. aquaticus to be sold as pets, usually from online platforms like eBay.

== Taxonomy and conservation ==
Asellus aquaticus was named by Carl Linnaeus in 1758 in the 10th edition of Systema Naturae, originally as Oniscus aquaticus. Despite having been named early in the history of animal taxonomy, the species was not given a proper description of its anatomy until 2008. The species has been described as potentially being a species complex containing several cryptic species, with populations from the Italian peninsula and the Balkans being strongly genetically distinct from populations in the rest of Europe (likely reflecting the retreat of the species into several isolated refugia in southern Europe during Pleistocene ice ages), with the Slovenian species Asellus kosswigi found to be nested within A. aquaticus as currently defined.

A number of subspecies are considered to be endangered including:

- Asellus aquaticus carniolicus, endemic to Slovenia.
- Asellus aquaticus cavernicolus found only in Italy and Slovenia.
- Asellus aquaticus cyclobranchialis, endemic to Slovenia.
