= Caecidotea beattyi =

Conservation status
- Vulnerable (NatureServe)

Scientific classification
- Kingdom: Animalia
- Phylum: Arthropoda
- Class: Malacostraca
- Order: Isopoda
- Family: Asellidae
- Genus: Caecidotea
- Species: C. beattyi

Binomial name
- Caecidotea beattyi Lewis & Bowman, 1981

Species of crustacean

Caecidotea beattyi is a species of isopod in the family Asellidae. It is endemic to Indiana, Illinois and Missouri in the United States.
