= Caecidotea nickajackensis =

Conservation status
- Vulnerable (IUCN 2.3)

Scientific classification
- Kingdom: Animalia
- Phylum: Arthropoda
- Clade: Pancrustacea
- Class: Malacostraca
- Order: Isopoda
- Family: Asellidae
- Genus: Caecidotea
- Species: C. nickajackensis

Binomial name
- Caecidotea nickajackensis Packard, 1881

Species of crustacean

Caecidotea nickajackensis is a species of isopod crustacean in the family Asellidae. It was believed to be endemic to a single cave in Tennessee, and was thought to have been exterminated when that cave was flooded in 1967 by the building of the Nickajack Dam, however, in 2013 the species was discovered within Horseskull Cave and Raccoon Mountain Caverns.

== Distribution ==
Caecidotea nickajackensis was first recorded in Nickajack Cave, Tennessee, before the building of the Nickajack Dam by the Tennessee Valley Authority in 1967. Two other obligate stygobionts were exterminated in the same action – the pseudoscorpion Microcreagris nickajackensis and the ground beetle Pseudanophthalmus nickajackensis. In 2013 Caecidotea nickajackensis was discovered within Horseskull Cave and Raccoon Mountain Caverns.

== Conservation ==
Caecidotea nickajackensis was listed as a vulnerable species on the IUCN Red List, and as a "species of concern" under the Endangered Species Act. It was extirpated from Nickajack Cave in 1967, and was then thought to be extinct.

== Taxonomy ==
Caecidotea nickajackensis was first described by Alpheus Spring Packard, in an 1881 publication by Edward Drinker Cope and himself, titled The Fauna of Nickajack Cave. A second species, C. richardsonae, was described from the same cave by William Perry Hay in 1901, and was thought to be a junior synonym of C. nickajackensis for a long time. It was now recognised as a separate species distributed from Alabama to Virginia.
