= Bragasellus conimbricensis =

Scientific classification
- Kingdom: Animalia
- Phylum: Arthropoda
- Class: Malacostraca
- Order: Isopoda
- Family: Asellidae
- Genus: Bragasellus
- Species: B. conimbricensis

Binomial name
- Bragasellus conimbricensis (Braga, 1946)

Synonyms
- Asellus conimbricensis Braga, 1946

Species of crustacean

Bragasellus conimbricensis is a species of crustacean in the family Asellidae. It is endemic to Portugal.
