= Asellus alaskensis =

Scientific classification
- Kingdom: Animalia
- Phylum: Arthropoda
- Clade: Pancrustacea
- Class: Malacostraca
- Order: Isopoda
- Family: Asellidae
- Genus: Asellus
- Species: A. alaskensis

Binomial name
- Asellus alaskensis Bowman & Holmquist, 1975

Species of freshwater isopod

Asellus alaskensis is a species of freshwater isopod crustacean in the family Asellidae. It is notable as the only native member of the genus Asellus found in North America, with its distribution range in Alaska.

== Ecology and distribution ==
While most species within the genus Asellus are widely distributed across Europe and Asia, Asellus alaskensis occupies subarctic freshwater ecosystems in northwestern North America.
