= Caecidotea bicrenata =

Scientific classification
- Kingdom: Animalia
- Phylum: Arthropoda
- Class: Malacostraca
- Order: Isopoda
- Family: Asellidae
- Genus: Caecidotea
- Species: C. bicrenata

Binomial name
- Caecidotea bicrenata (Steeves, 1963)

Synonyms
- Asellus bicrenata Steeves, 1963

Species of crustacean

Caecidotea bicrenata is a species of isopod in the family Asellidae. It is endemic to Eastern United States.

== Subspecies ==
The species has two subspecies:

- Caecidotea bicrenata bicrenata (Steeves, 1963)
- Caecidotea bicrenata whitei Lewis & Bowman, 1981
