= Caecidotea adenta =

Conservation status
- Critically Imperiled (NatureServe)

Scientific classification
- Kingdom: Animalia
- Phylum: Arthropoda
- Class: Malacostraca
- Order: Isopoda
- Family: Asellidae
- Genus: Caecidotea
- Species: C. adenta

Binomial name
- Caecidotea adenta (Mackin & Hubricht, 1940)

Synonyms
- Asellus adenta Mackin & Hubricht, 1940

Species of crustacean

Caecidotea adenta is a species of crustacean in the family Asellidae. It is endemic to Oklahoma in the United States.
