= Caecidotea ancyla =

Conservation status
- Vulnerable (NatureServe)

Scientific classification
- Kingdom: Animalia
- Phylum: Arthropoda
- Class: Malacostraca
- Order: Isopoda
- Family: Asellidae
- Genus: Caecidotea
- Species: C. ancyla

Binomial name
- Caecidotea ancyla (Fleming, 1972)

Synonyms
- Asellus ancylus Fleming, 1972

Species of crustacean

Caecidotea ancyla is a species of a freshwater crustacean in the family Asellidae. It is endemic to Arkansas and Mississippi in the United States.
