= Bragasellus frontellum =

Scientific classification
- Kingdom: Animalia
- Phylum: Arthropoda
- Class: Malacostraca
- Order: Isopoda
- Family: Asellidae
- Genus: Bragasellus
- Species: B. frontellum

Binomial name
- Bragasellus frontellum (Braga, 1964)

Synonyms
- Asellus frontellum Braga, 1964

Species of crustacean

Bragasellus frontellum is a species of crustacean in the family Asellidae. It is endemic to Portugal.
