= Caecidotea bilineata =

Conservation status
- Imperiled (NatureServe)

Scientific classification
- Kingdom: Animalia
- Phylum: Arthropoda
- Class: Malacostraca
- Order: Isopoda
- Family: Asellidae
- Genus: Caecidotea
- Species: C. bilineata

Binomial name
- Caecidotea bilineata Lewis & Bowman, 1996

Species of crustacean

Caecidotea bilineata is a species of marine isopod in the family Asellidae. It is endemic to Texas in the United States.
