= Caecidotea macropropoda =

Conservation status
- Vulnerable (IUCN 2.3)

Scientific classification
- Kingdom: Animalia
- Phylum: Arthropoda
- Class: Malacostraca
- Order: Isopoda
- Family: Asellidae
- Genus: Caecidotea
- Species: C. macropropoda

Binomial name
- Caecidotea macropropoda Chase & Blair, 1937

Species of crustacean

Caecidotea macropropoda is a species of freshwater isopod in the family Asellidae. It is endemic to the United States.
