= Bragasellus lagari =

Scientific classification
- Kingdom: Animalia
- Phylum: Arthropoda
- Clade: Pancrustacea
- Class: Malacostraca
- Order: Isopoda
- Family: Asellidae
- Genus: Bragasellus
- Species: B. lagari

Binomial name
- Bragasellus lagari Henry & Magniez, 1973

Species of crustacean

Bragasellus lagari is a species of crustacean in the family Asellidae. It is endemic to Portugal.
