= Caecidotea barri =

Conservation status
- Endangered (IUCN 3.1)

- Critically Imperiled (NatureServe)

Scientific classification
- Kingdom: Animalia
- Phylum: Arthropoda
- Class: Malacostraca
- Order: Isopoda
- Family: Asellidae
- Genus: Caecidotea
- Species: C. barri

Binomial name
- Caecidotea barri (Steeves, 1965)

Species of crustacean

Caecidotea barri, commonly known as the Clifton Cave isopod, is a species of crustacean in the family Asellidae. It is endemic to Kentucky in the United States.
