= Bragasellus seabrai =

Scientific classification
- Kingdom: Animalia
- Phylum: Arthropoda
- Class: Malacostraca
- Order: Isopoda
- Family: Asellidae
- Genus: Bragasellus
- Species: B. seabrai

Binomial name
- Bragasellus seabrai (Braga, 1943)

Synonyms
- Asellus seabrai Braga, 1943; Proasellus seabrai Braga, 1943

Species of crustacean

Bragasellus seabrai is a species of crustacean in the family Asellidae. It is endemic to Portugal.
