= Bragasellus incurvatus =

Scientific classification
- Kingdom: Animalia
- Phylum: Arthropoda
- Class: Malacostraca
- Order: Isopoda
- Family: Asellidae
- Genus: Bragasellus
- Species: B. incurvatus

Binomial name
- Bragasellus incurvatus Afonso, 1984

Species of crustacean

Bragasellus incurvatus is a species of crustacean in the family Asellidae. It is endemic to Portugal.
