= Caecidotea antricola =

Scientific classification
- Kingdom: Animalia
- Phylum: Arthropoda
- Class: Malacostraca
- Order: Isopoda
- Family: Asellidae
- Genus: Caecidotea
- Species: C. antricola

Binomial name
- Caecidotea antricola Creaser, 1931

Synonyms
- Conasellus antricolus (Creaser, 1931)

Species of crustacean

Caecidotea antricola is a species of freshwater crustacean in the family Asellidae. It is endemic to Arkansas and Missouri in the United States.
