= Caecidotea acuticarpa =

Conservation status
- Imperiled (NatureServe)

Scientific classification
- Kingdom: Animalia
- Phylum: Arthropoda
- Class: Malacostraca
- Order: Isopoda
- Family: Asellidae
- Genus: Caecidotea
- Species: C. acuticarpa

Binomial name
- Caecidotea acuticarpa Mackin & Hubricht, 1940

Species of crustacean

Caecidotea acuticarpa is a species of crustacean in the family Asellidae. It is endemic to Kansas and Oklahoma in the United States.
