= Proasellus slovenicus =

Conservation status
- Vulnerable (IUCN 2.3)

Scientific classification
- Kingdom: Animalia
- Phylum: Arthropoda
- Class: Malacostraca
- Order: Isopoda
- Family: Asellidae
- Genus: Proasellus
- Species: P. slovenicus

Binomial name
- Proasellus slovenicus (Sket, 1957)

Species of crustacean

Proasellus slovenicus is a species of isopod in the family Asellidae. It is found in Europe.

The IUCN conservation status of Proasellus slovenicus is "VU", vulnerable. The species faces a high risk of endangerment in the medium term.
