= Bragasellus comasioides =

Scientific classification
- Kingdom: Animalia
- Phylum: Arthropoda
- Clade: Pancrustacea
- Class: Malacostraca
- Order: Isopoda
- Family: Asellidae
- Genus: Bragasellus
- Species: B. comasioides

Binomial name
- Bragasellus comasioides Magniez & Brehier, 2004

Species of crustacean

Bragasellus comasioides is a species of crustacean in the family Asellidae.
