= Lirceus culveri =

Conservation status
- Vulnerable (IUCN 3.1)

- Critically Imperiled (NatureServe)

Scientific classification
- Kingdom: Animalia
- Phylum: Arthropoda
- Class: Malacostraca
- Order: Isopoda
- Family: Asellidae
- Genus: Lirceus
- Species: L. culveri

Binomial name
- Lirceus culveri Estes & Holsinger, 1976

Species of crustacean

Lirceus culveri, the Rye Cove cave isopod, is a species of isopod in the family Asellidae. It is endemic to McDavids Cave in Scott County, Virginia in the United States.

The IUCN conservation status of Lirceus culveri is "VU", vulnerable. The species faces a high risk of endangerment in the medium term. The IUCN status was reviewed in 1996.
