= Bragasellus oscari =

Scientific classification
- Kingdom: Animalia
- Phylum: Arthropoda
- Class: Malacostraca
- Order: Isopoda
- Family: Asellidae
- Genus: Bragasellus
- Species: B. oscari

Binomial name
- Bragasellus oscari López, 2020

Species of crustacean

Bragasellus oscari is a species of crustacean in the family Asellidae, which was first described by Eduardo López in 2020.
