= Bragasellus escolai =

Scientific classification
- Kingdom: Animalia
- Phylum: Arthropoda
- Class: Malacostraca
- Order: Isopoda
- Family: Asellidae
- Genus: Bragasellus
- Species: B. escolai

Binomial name
- Bragasellus escolai Henry & Magniez, 1978

Species of crustacean

Bragasellus escolai is a species of crustacean in the family Asellidae. It is endemic to Portugal.
