= Caecidotea attenuata =

Scientific classification
- Kingdom: Animalia
- Phylum: Arthropoda
- Class: Malacostraca
- Order: Isopoda
- Family: Asellidae
- Genus: Caecidotea
- Species: C. attenuata

Binomial name
- Caecidotea attenuata (Richardson, 1900)

Synonyms
- Asellus atenuata Richardson, 1900

Species of crustacean

Caecidotea attenuata is a species of freshwater isopod in the family Asellidae. It is endemic to Eastern United States and Eastern Canada.
