= Bowmanasellus sequoiae =

Conservation status
- Imperiled (NatureServe)

Scientific classification
- Kingdom: Animalia
- Phylum: Arthropoda
- Class: Malacostraca
- Order: Isopoda
- Family: Asellidae
- Genus: Bowmanasellus; Lewis, 2008
- Species: B. sequoiae

Binomial name
- Bowmanasellus sequoiae (Bowman, 1975)

Synonyms
- Caecidotea sequoiae Bowman, 1975

Species of crustacean

Bowmanasellus sequoiae, commonly known as the Sequoia Cave isopod, is a species of crustacean in the family Asellidae. It is endemic to California in the United States.
