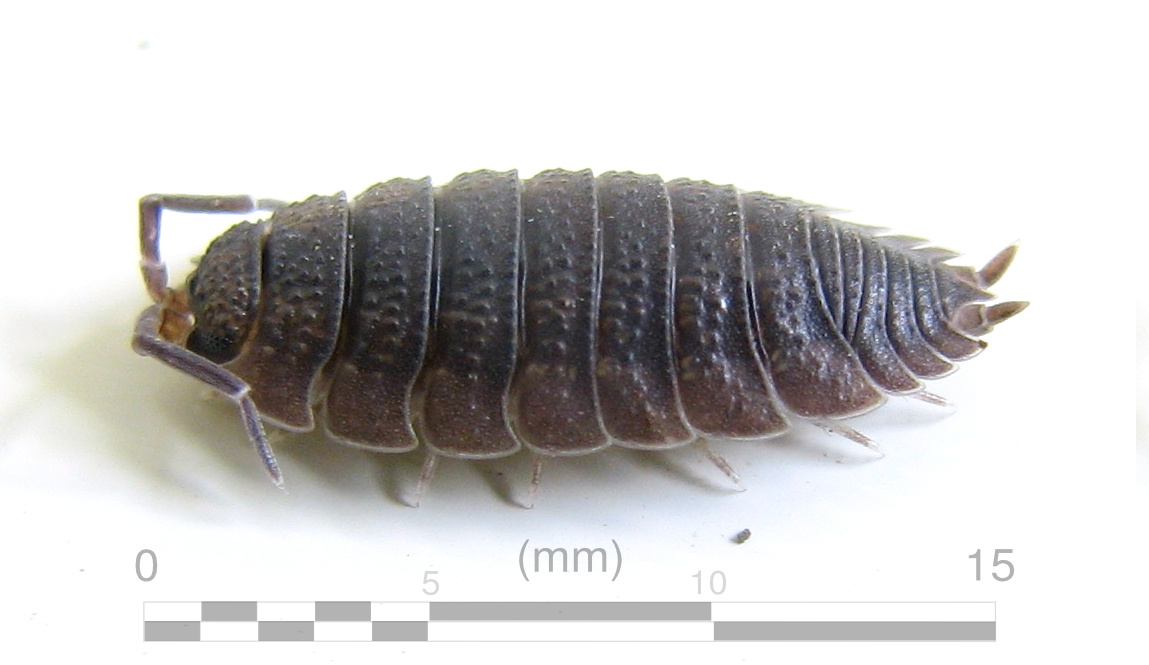
- P. scaber, head is left

Scientific classification
- Kingdom: Animalia
- Phylum: Arthropoda
- Class: Malacostraca
- Order: Isopoda
- Suborder: Oniscidea
- Family: Porcellionidae
- Genus: Porcellio
- Species: P. scaber

Binomial name
- Porcellio scaber Latreille, 1804

Synonyms
- P. s. americanus Arcangeli, 1932; P. s. japonicus Verhoeff, 1928

= Porcellio scaber =

Species of woodlouse

Porcellio scaber (otherwise known as the common rough woodlouse or simply rough woodlouse), is a species of woodlouse native to Europe but with a cosmopolitan distribution. They are often found in large numbers in most regions, with many species (shrews, centipedes, toads, spiders and even some birds) preying on them.

== Taxonomy ==
One subspecies, Porcellio scaber lusitanus, is currently recognized. Two other subspecies were historically deemed valid but are no longer recognized. P. s. americanus, described in 1932, was considered endemic in the Americas. P. s. japonicus was described in 1928 and believed to be endemic to Japan. Both subspecies were synonymized with the nominate in 2020.

== Distribution ==
Porcellio scaber is found across Central and Western Europe. In the United Kingdom, it is one of the "big five" species of woodlice. It has also colonised North America, South Africa and other regions including the remote sub-Antarctic Marion island, largely through human activity. It is also the most common species of woodlice found in Australia.

== Description and Life cycle ==
Porcellio scaber has an oval body, can grow up to 20 millimetres (0.79 in) long, and is usually a grey colour, paler underneath. Rare color morphs are commonly cultivated in captivity, which can additionally have brown, white, orange, yellow, or purplish coloring, and various patterns. Bright blue individuals have been documented, although their color is not a natural variation and is caused by an iridovirus. The dorsal (upper) surface of its segmented exoskeleton is covered in a series of small tubercles hence its common name.

At the head it has two pairs of antennae, with the inner pair being very small. Two compound eyes are located on the dorsal side of the head, while the mouthparts are on the ventral (lower) side.

There are 7 pairs of legs, corresponding to the 7 segments of the thorax. The short abdomen consists of 6 segments. On the ventral side of the abdomen there are two whitish pseudo-lungs, connected with pores to the outside air. At the rear end there is a small telson flanked by a pair of appendages known as uropods.

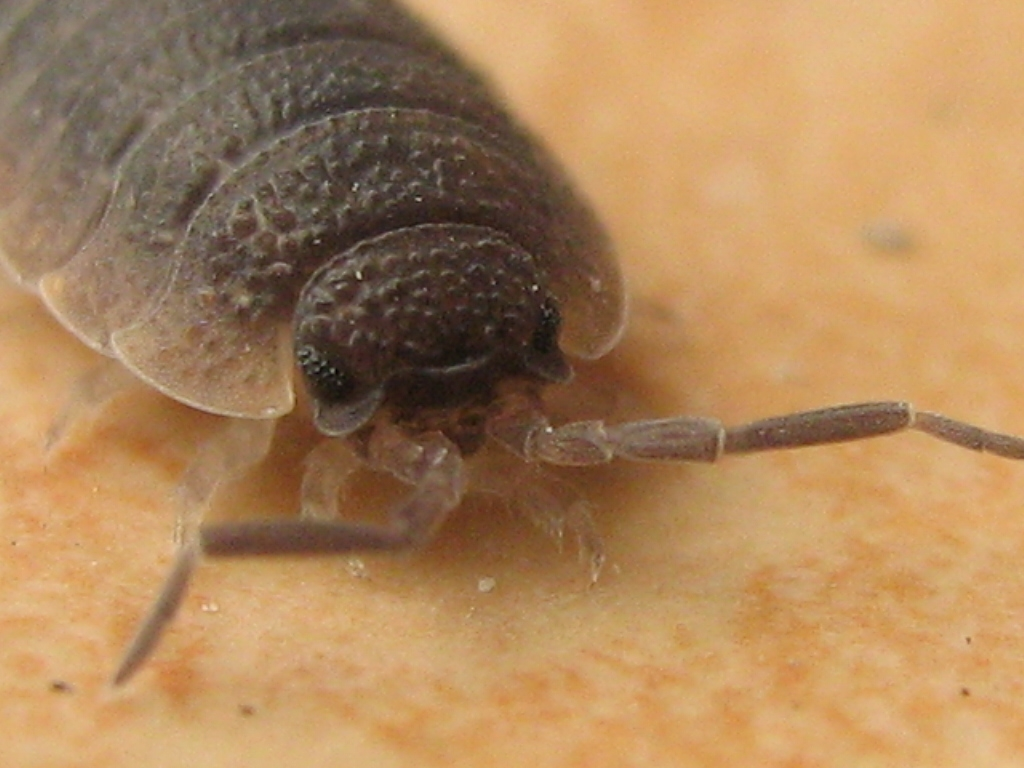
Head with antennae and compound eyes

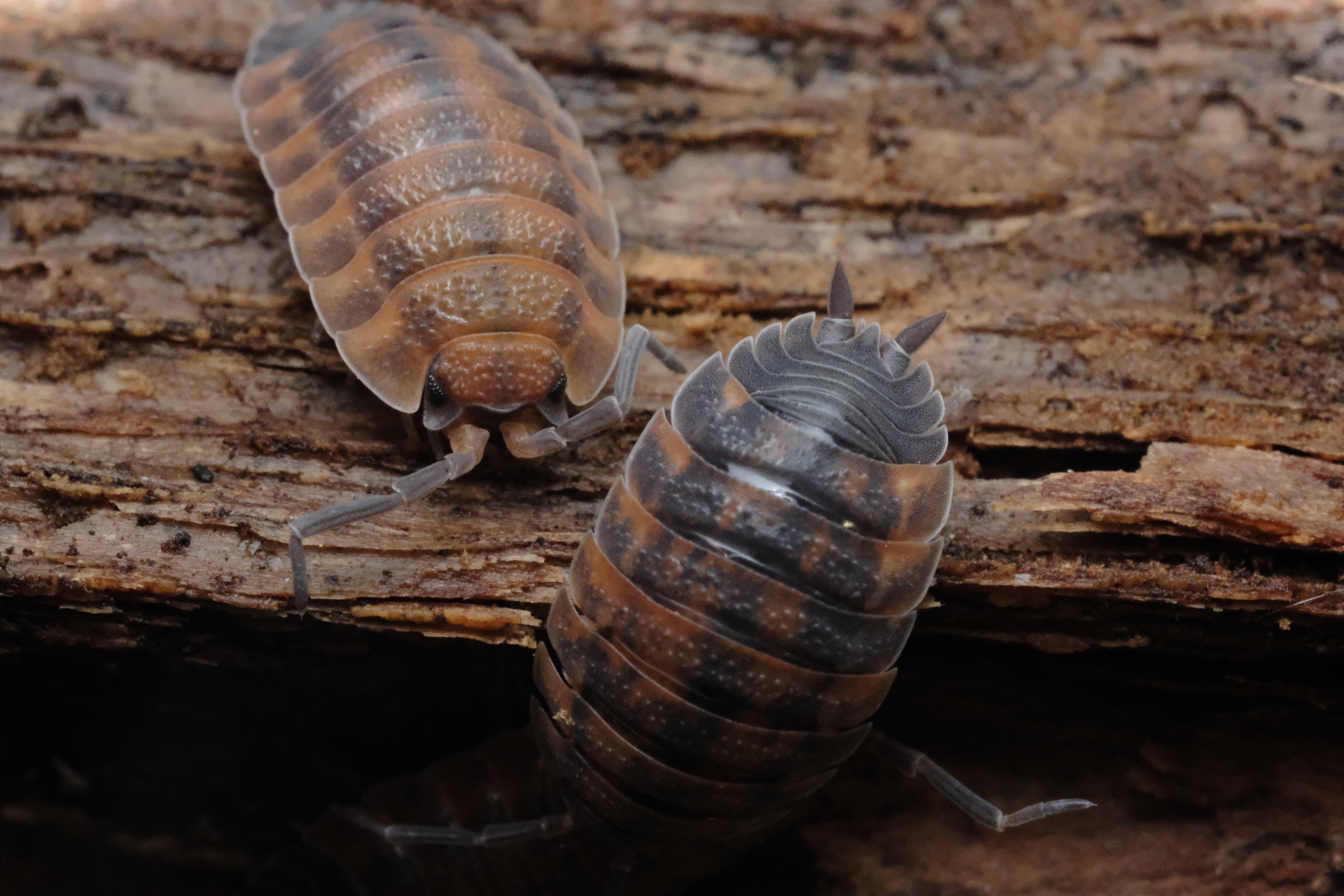
Individuals bred for showing the "lava" morph

The females carry about 25 to 90 fertilized eggs until they hatch and are held in a fluid-filled sac at the ventral side of the abdomen for about 40–50 days. The young are reproductively mature after 3 months; the adult animals have a life expectancy of about two years.

== Habitat ==
Like other species of woodlouse, Porcellio scaber loses water by diffusion through its permeable exoskeleton which lacks a waxy cuticle. Because of this it often seeks out small and narrow spaces to minimise water loss, avoiding bright light to prevent desiccation,. It lives in a wide variety of damp habitats but it is less dependent on high levels of humidity than Oniscus asellus.

== Feeding ==
Porcellio scaber is a detritivore – it mainly feeds on decaying leaf litter but will consume any rotting plant matter. Living plants are of limited nutritional value for these woodlice which prefer to feed on the bacteria and fungi which cause decay. P. scaber has very sensitive olfactory receptors that allow it detect the smell of microbial activity and to locate food.

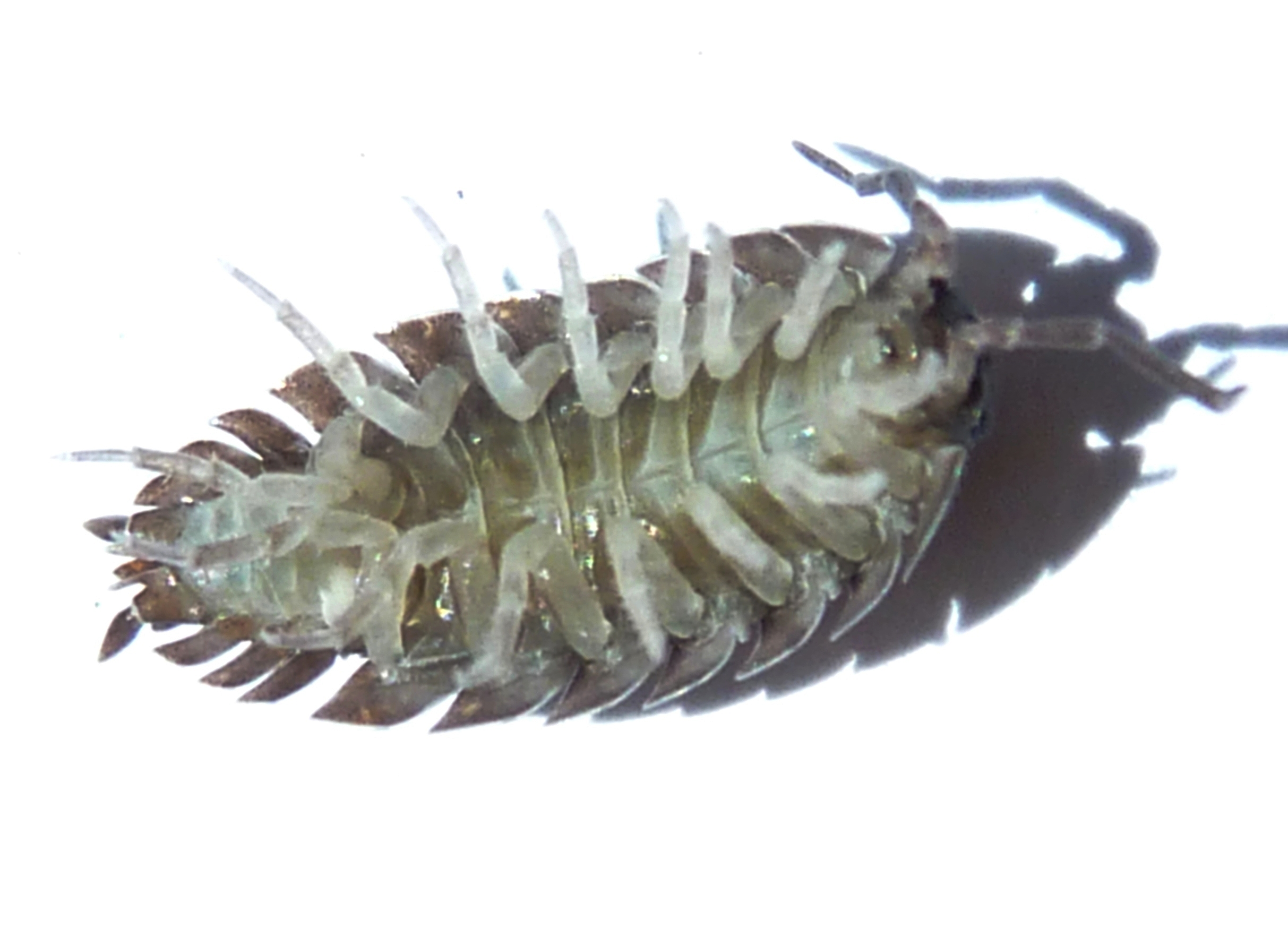
Ventral side

== Behaviour ==
P. scaber has been studied for kinesis behaviour such as turn alternation. During klinokinesis, turns alternate between left and right. This helps the woodlouse escape from a harmful environment or predator more efficiently as alternating turns average to form a straight line, unlike random turns which may well become a circle back to the predator. Several mechanisms for this have been proposed, such as short-term memory or following the outside wall, but the theory with most support is the bilateral asymmetrical leg movement (BALM) mechanism, which suggests that on the original turn, the legs on the outside of the turn become relatively more tired, so end up being overpowered by the legs on the inside of the turn, causing it to turn the opposite way from last time.

Unlike the 'roller' species of woodlouse, such as Armadillidium spp., which are able to curl into a ball to defend themselves, P. scaber is a 'clinger' and adopts a posture of tonic immobility when faced with the threat of predation. A study of this thanatosis behaviour found that individuals of this species had unique personalities with shy woodlice staying still for longer and bold woodlice staying immobile for less time.

== Algorithm ==
Inspired by the behaviours of P. scaber, an algorithm for solving constrained optimization problems was proposed, called the Porcellio scaber algorithm (PSA).

== See also ==
- List of woodlice of the British Isles
