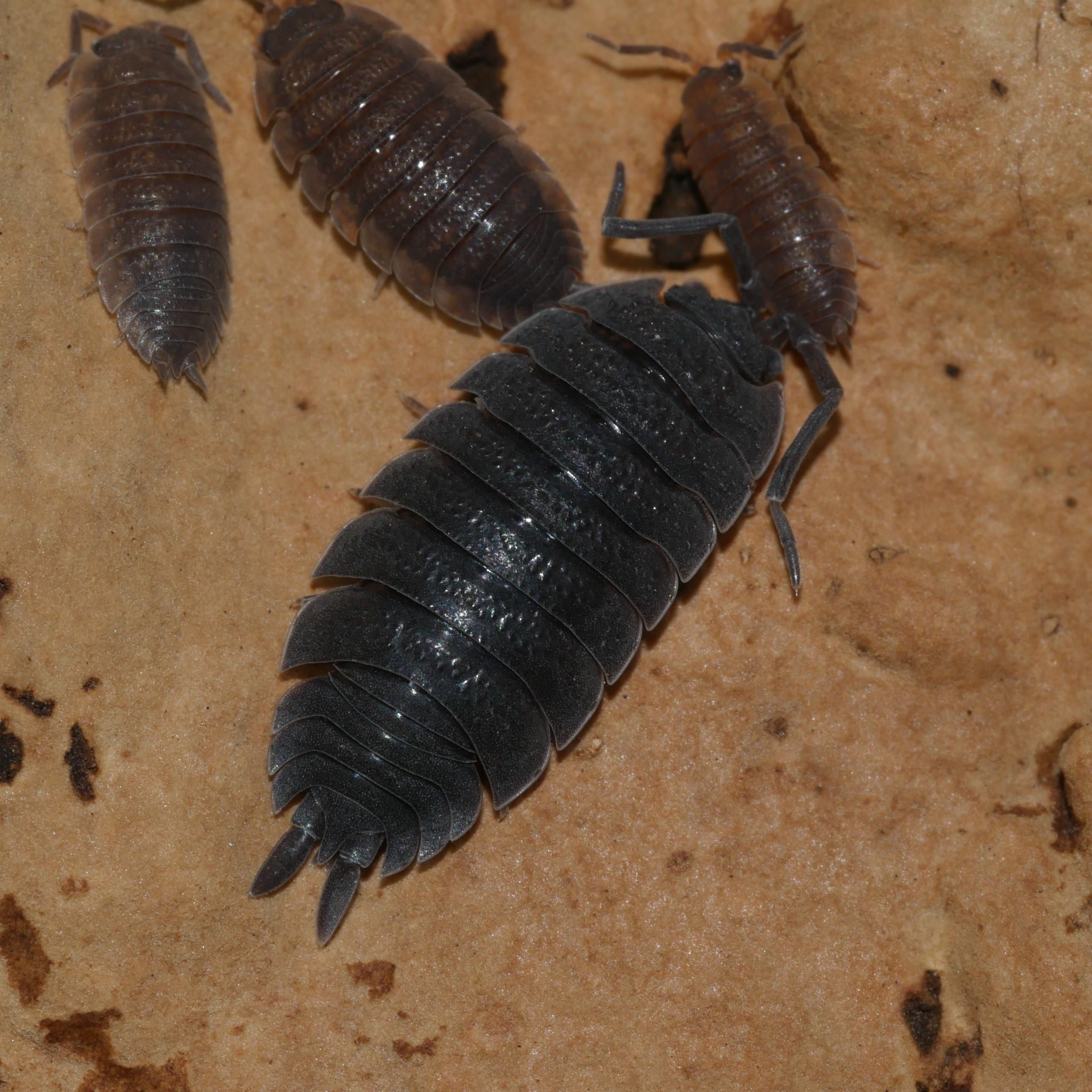

Scientific classification
- Kingdom: Animalia
- Phylum: Arthropoda
- Clade: Pancrustacea
- Class: Malacostraca
- Order: Isopoda
- Suborder: Oniscidea
- Family: Porcellionidae
- Genus: Porcellio
- Species: P. scaber
- Subspecies: P. s. lusitanus

Trinomial name
- Porcellio scaber lusitanus Verhoeff, 1907

= Porcellio scaber lusitanus =

Subspecies of woodlouse

Porcellio scaber lusitanus is a subspecies of Porcellio scaber endemic to Spain and Portugal. Described in 1907 as Porcellio lusitanus, the species was later lowered to a subspecies level despite being referred to as a form. It is highly likely that Porcellio scaber lusitanus are normal P. scaber with Allometric Growth.

== Description ==
Porcellio scaber lusitanus is large, typically measuring around 15-20mm in length. It has a dark gray coloration, with a granulated, glossy exoskeleton. The subspecies is characterized by its large size and pronounced cone-shaped granulation.

== Relationships with humans ==
Porcellio scaber lusitanus is kept in the Isopod Hobby under the name Porcellio scaber "Lava". The cultivar was collected from the border of Portugal and Spain and bred with Porcellio scaber scaber from Europe to form a uniquely colored mutation. The original American line was imported by Alan Grosse. A common misconception is that this cultivar is co-dominant. It is actually a single trait with highly variable expression. That is why there is so much variation in 'Lava' colonies compared to a less variable morph like 'Dalmatian'. The splotched marking with red and black is dominant. Therefore, isopods only need one copy of the gene for it to show, meaning it will show up in the first generation of any lava X non-lava cross, whereas recessive traits won't show up until the second generation.
