= Calasellus =

Scientific classification
- Kingdom: Animalia
- Phylum: Arthropoda
- Class: Malacostraca
- Order: Isopoda
- Family: Asellidae
- Genus: Calasellus; Bowman, 1981

Genus of crustaceans

Calasellus is a genus of isopod crustaceans in the family Asellidae. It contains the following species:

- Calasellus californicus (Miller, 1933)
- Calasellus longus Bowman, 1981
