= Phreatoasellus =

Scientific classification
- Kingdom: Animalia
- Phylum: Arthropoda
- Clade: Pancrustacea
- Class: Malacostraca
- Order: Isopoda
- Family: Asellidae
- Genus: Phreatoasellus; Matsumoto, 1962

Type species
- Phreatoaellus joianus (Henry & Magniez, 1991)

Synonyms
- Phreatoasellus Henry & Magniez, 1991; Asellus (Phreatoasellus) Matsumoto, 1962

Genus of crustaceans

Phreatoasellus is a genus of isopod crustaceans in the family Asellidae, endemic to Japan. It contains the following species:

== Species ==
Genus Phreatoasellus contains the following species:

- Phreatoasellus akyioshiensis (Ueno, 1927)
- Phreatoasellus higoensis (Matsumoto, 1960)
- Phreatoasellus iriei (Matsumoto, 1978)
- Phreatoasellus joianus (Henry & Magniez, 1991)
- Phreatoasellus kawamurai (Tattersall, 1921)
- Phreatoasellus minatoi (Matsumoto, 1978)
- Phreatoasellus uenoi (Matsumoto, 1978)
- Phreatoasellus yoshinoensis (Matsumoto, 1960)
