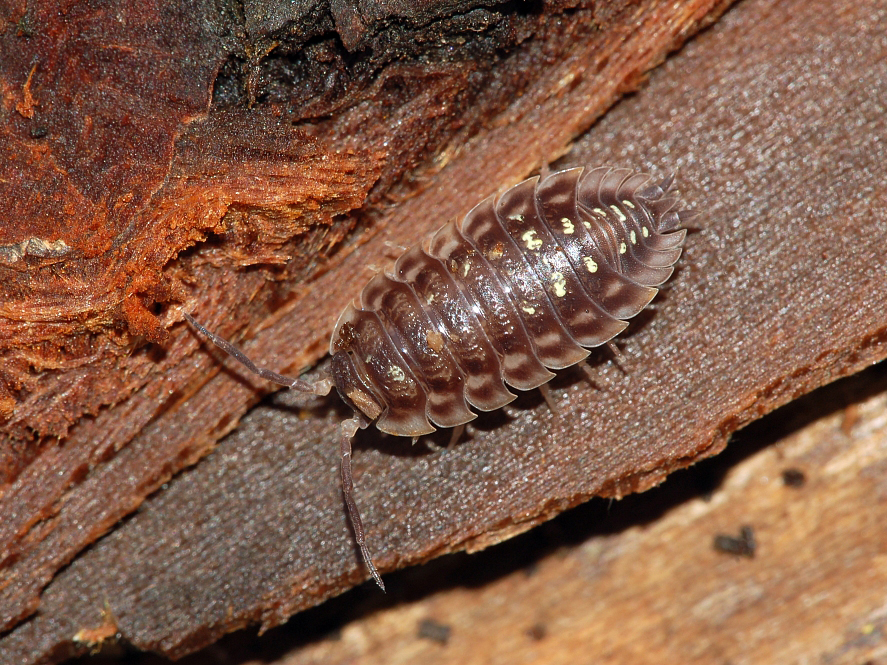
- Oniscus asellus

Scientific classification
- Kingdom: Animalia
- Phylum: Arthropoda
- Class: Malacostraca
- Order: Isopoda
- Suborder: Oniscidea
- Superfamily: Oniscoidea
- Family: Oniscidae; Latreille, 1802

Genera
- Oniscus Linnaeus, 1758 (5 species); Oroniscus Verhoeff, 1908 (11 species); Phalloniscus Budde-Lund, 1908 (22 species); Rabdoniscus Vandel, 1981 (monotypic); Rodoniscus Arcangeli, 1934 (monotypic); Sardoniscus Arcangeli, 1939 (2 species)

= Oniscidae =

Family of woodlice

Oniscidae is a family of woodlice, including the common woodlouse Oniscus asellus. Six genera are certainly placed in the family (Oniscus, Oroniscus, Phalloniscus, Rabdoniscus, Rodoniscus and Sardoniscus), with eight others included by some sources (Cerberoides, Diacara, Exalloniscus, Hanoniscus, Hiatoniscus, Hora, Krantzia and Tasmanoniscus).
