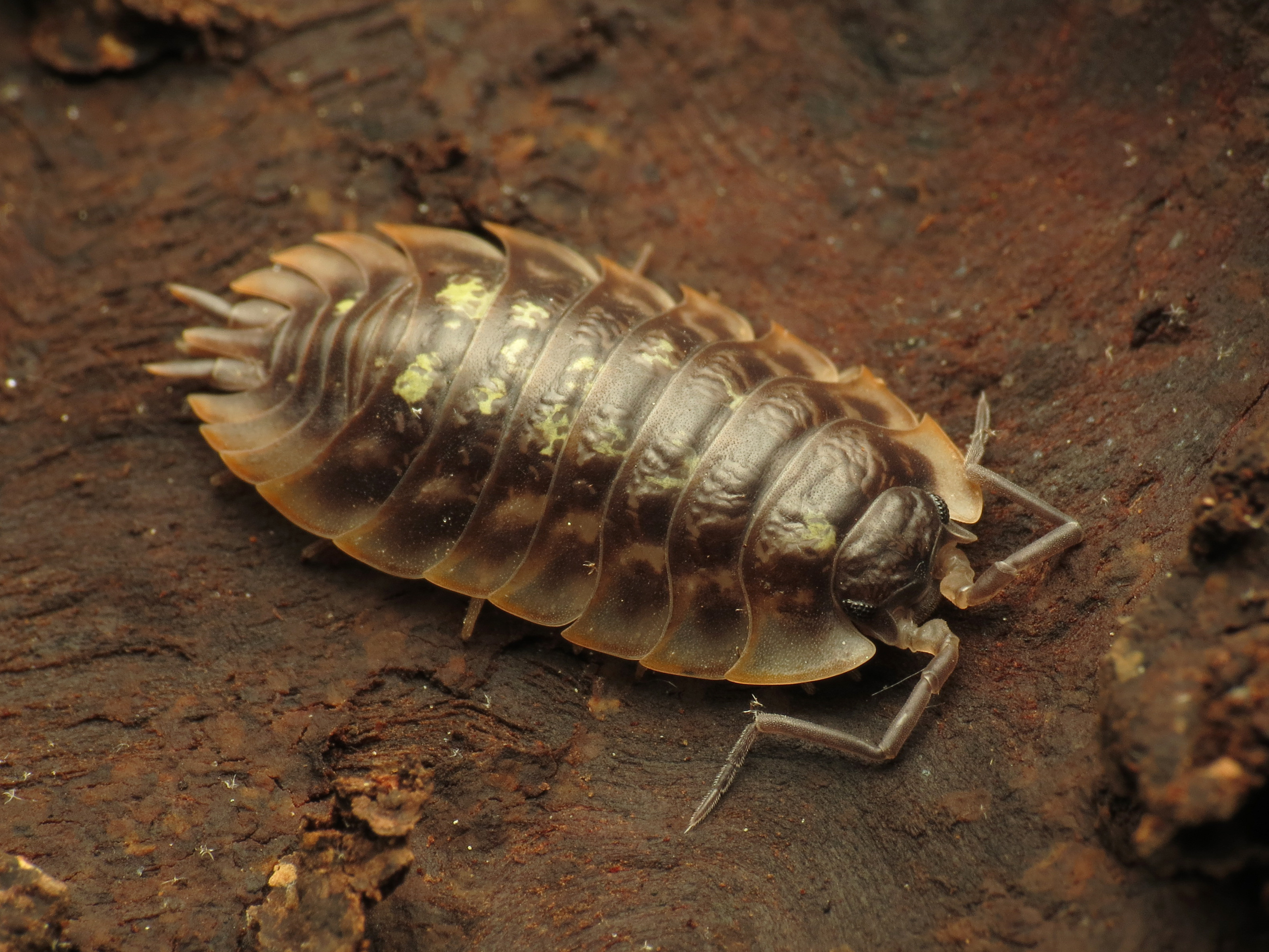

Scientific classification
- Kingdom: Animalia
- Phylum: Arthropoda
- Clade: Pancrustacea
- Class: Malacostraca
- Order: Isopoda
- Suborder: Oniscidea
- Family: Oniscidae
- Genus: Oniscus
- Species: O. asellus

Binomial name
- Oniscus asellus Linnaeus, 1758

Synonyms
- List: Oniscus affinis; Oniscus fossor; Oniscus lamperti; Oniscus languidus; Oniscus lineatus; Oniscus murarius; Oniscus nodulosus; Oniscus taeniola; Oniscus vicarius; Porcellio lineatus; Porcellio taeniola

= Oniscus asellus =

Species of woodlouse

Oniscus asellus, the common woodlouse, is one of the largest and most common species of woodlouse native to the British Isles and Western and Northern Europe, growing to 16 millimetres (0.63 in) long and 6 millimetres (0.24 in) wide. Oniscus asellus was first described by Swedish biologist Carl Linnaeus in his Systema Naturae, and is a very common species, representing in Britain "the archetypal 'woodlouse' familiar to the general public". It lives in a great variety of habitats, but favours damp conditions, especially under rotting wood. O. asellus is also a successfully synanthropic species, dwelling in gardens, walls, and inside houses.

== Classification ==
Oniscus asellus was described as Oniscus Aſellus in the tenth edition of Systema Naturae by Carl Linnaeus in 1758. Numerous other names, many also in the genus Oniscus but two in the genus Porcellio, have since been identified as taxonomic synonyms of Linnaeus' species. O. asellus is commonly known as the common woodlouse.

The subspecies common in most of the world is O. asellus asellus, but in western France and southeastern Britain, a genetically distinct form of the common woodlouse has been identified and classified as the subspecies O. asellus occidentalis. Described in 1994 by David Bilton it tends to be smaller but more colourful, and has a slightly different body shape. The two subspecies are able to interbreed and produce hybrids which mix their physical characteristics.

== Distribution ==
The common woodlouse is the most widespread species of woodlouse in the British Isles, both geographically and ecologically, being one of the "most pervasive" of Britain's wildlife. It is adapted equally well to northern areas as to southern ones, and has been recorded in every vice-county of England, Scotland, Wales, and Ireland. It is less common in the Mediterranean Basin, but is widespread in Northern and Western Europe, from Portugal to Sweden as far east as Ukraine, as well as in the Azores and Madeira; it has also been widely introduced in the Americas, predominantly in Mexico and in the United States, east of the Mississippi River and west of the Rocky Mountains. According to the British Myriapod and Isopod Group, Oniscus asellus, along with Porcellio scaber, "represents the archetypal 'woodlouse' familiar to the general public". As of April 2025, Oniscus asellus is the third-most observed species of woodlouse in the world in the citizen science website iNaturalist, after Porcellio scaber and Armadillidium vulgare.

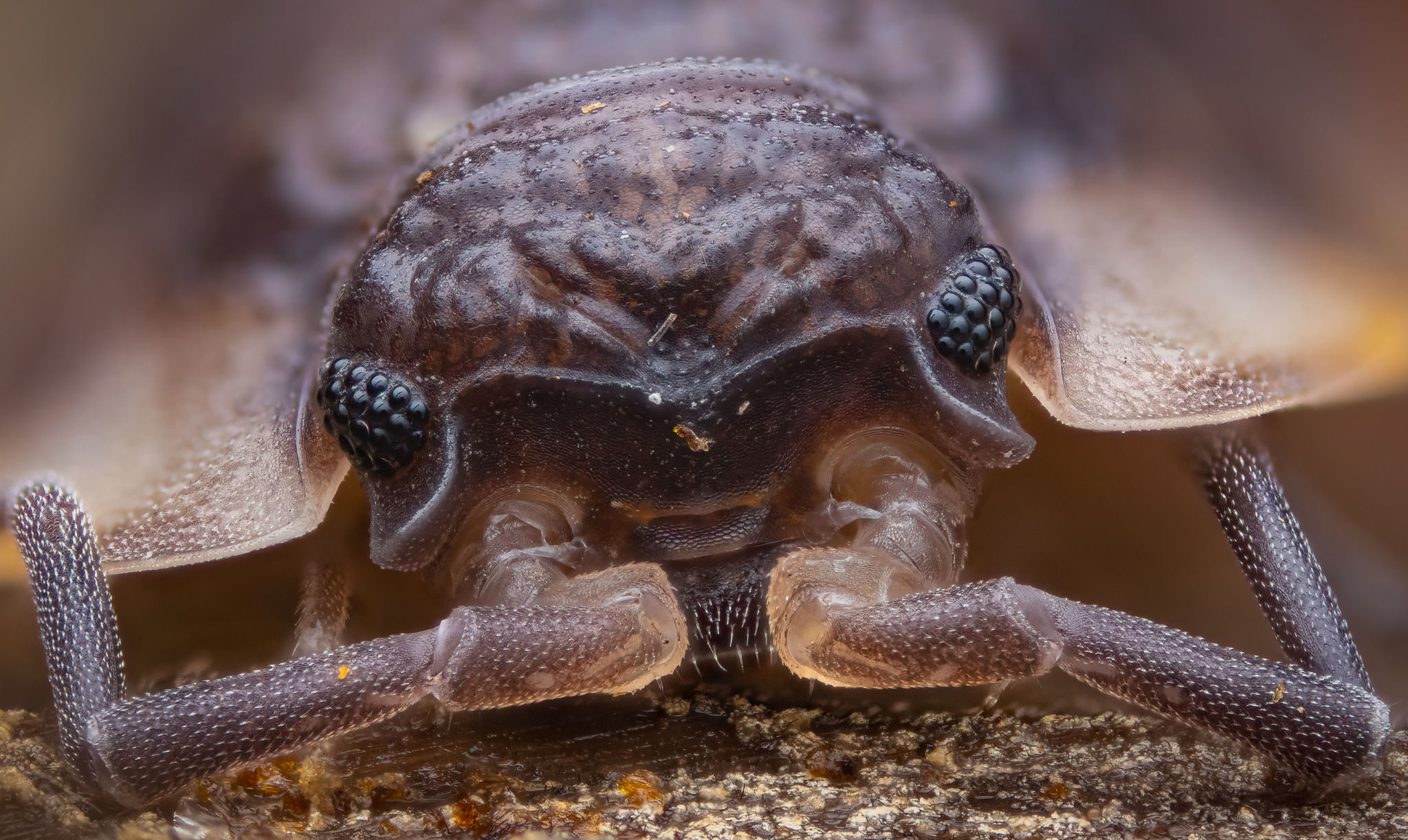
Close-up of Oniscus asellus face

== Description ==
=== General appearance ===
The common woodlouse is one of the largest native woodlice in Britain, at up to 16 millimetres (629.92 mils) long. It is relatively flat, and is a shiny brown-grey in colour, but paler-coloured specimens sometimes occur. The juveniles have rough bumps and orange markings, leading them to sometimes be misidentified as Porcellio scaber. In his 1758 description, Linnaeus gave the defining characteristics of O. asellus as an oval shape, broad abdomen, and bifurcated tail.

=== External morphology ===
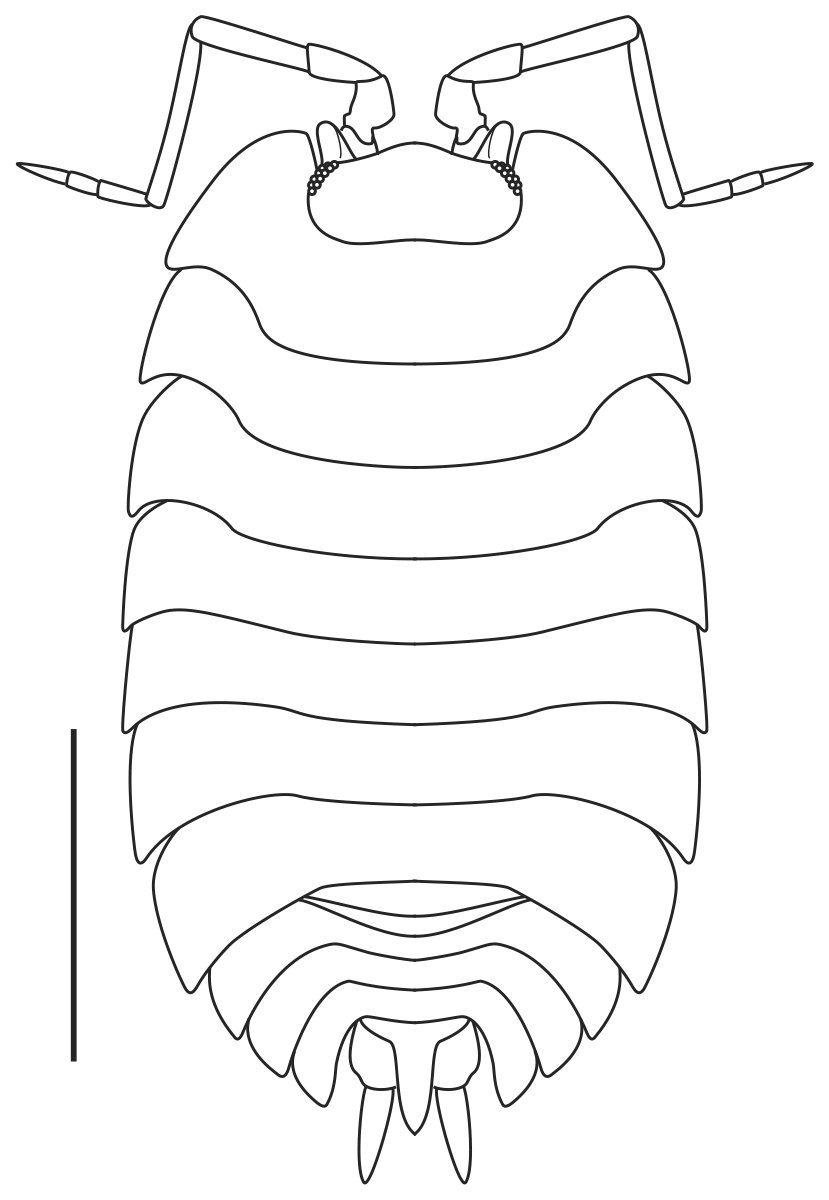
Diagram showing the segmentation of O. asellus. The scale bar represents 5 mm.

All members of the genus Oniscus are defined by several morphological characteristics. Oniscus species have three-segmented flagella, (Note: Flagella in isopods are a set of small segments at the antenna tip.) along with a wide abdomen and a head with lateral lobes. They are unable to completely roll themselves up into a ball.

Harriet Richardson described the body of O. asellus as being about one and half times longer than it is wide, about 10 by 16 mm (390 by 630 mils). The head is longer than it is wide, measuring 2 by 3 mm (79 by 118 mils), with the front margin slightly convex. There are pronounced, narrow, elongate lobes, located anterolaterally, nearly 1 mm (39 mils) long and rounded anteriorly. The compound eyes are small and situated on the sides of the head at the base of the prominent lobes. There are two pairs of antennae; the first, inconspicuous and comprising only a couple segments; the second is composed of five segments, each longer than the first. The segments of the thorax are nearly equal in length. The first segment has projections which extend to surround the head, and all segments are expanded to the sides, with straight lateral margins. The segments of the abdomen are distinct, with the first two being somewhat shorter, and their lateral parts covered by the overhanging seventh segment of the thorax. The abdominal segments three to five have extensions which continue the oval outline of the body. The lateral extensions of the fifth segment extend far back, as far as the extremity of the sixth and ultimate segment. This final segment has a triangular shape, with the apex formed from a process pointed posteriorly. The uropoda are mostly covered by the final abdominal segment.

=== Moulting ===
Pale patches are often visible on the back of Oniscus asellus; these are areas that store calcium, which is then used to reinforce the exoskeleton after a moult. Moulting occurs in two halves, with the rear half moulting before the front half. The exuvia that is moulted is often consumed by the animal after moulting.

=== Reproductive anatomy ===
Female Oniscus asellus woodlice have two tube-shaped ovaries. These are located on either side of the woodlouse's gut and run much of the animal's body length. Female germ cells, or ovocytes, are found in the ovary in varying sizes. In males, there are two testes, each comprising three "narrow lobes" with three corresponding into the vas deferens. Inside the lobes, germ cells develop; each lobe "may be divided into two principal regions of growth, composed of cells of different generations and of differing degrees of development."

== Ecology ==
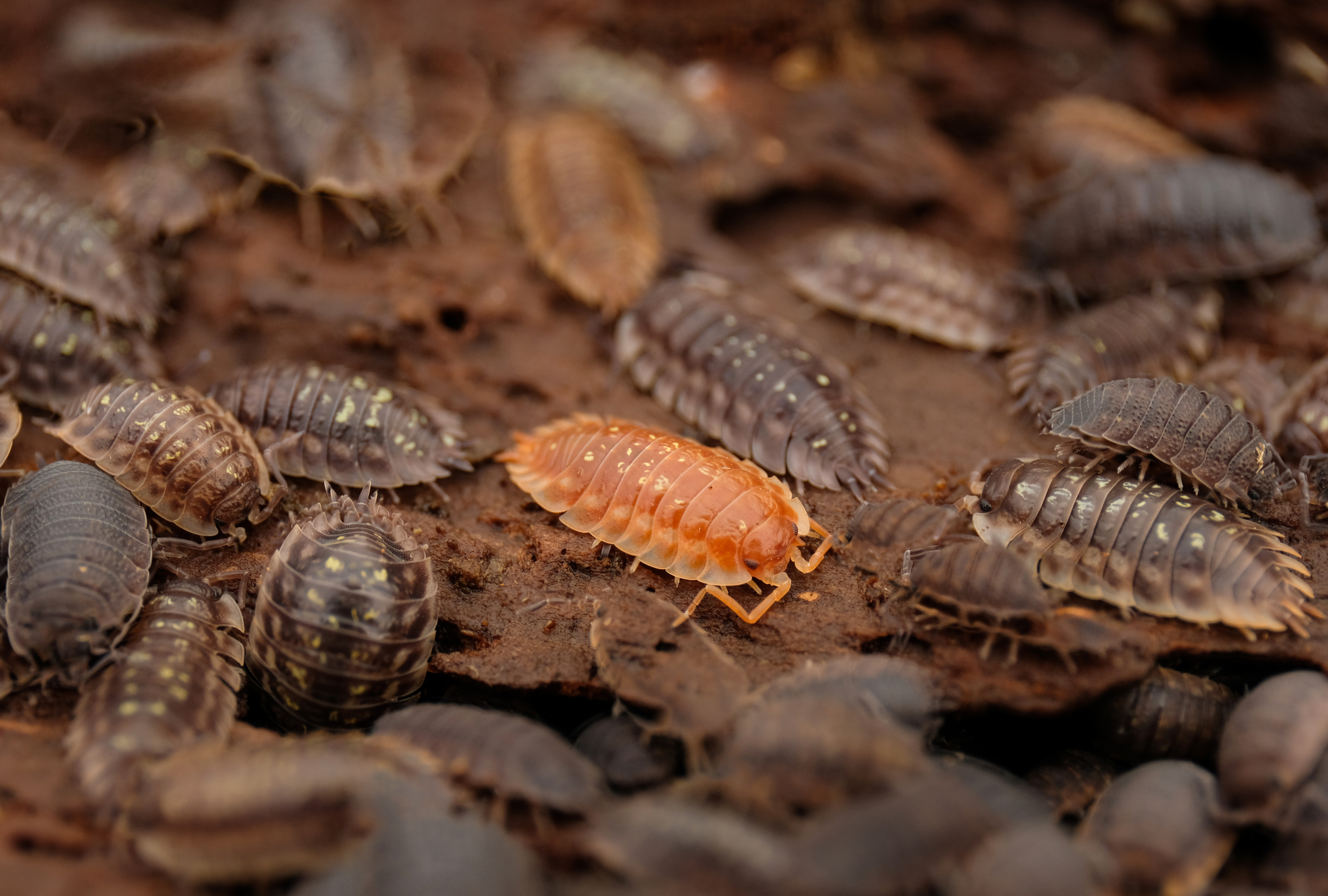
Orange colour mutation, in British Columbia, Canada

The common woodlouse occurs in a wide range of habitats, including some with little available calcium, but not dry ones. The species is found both inland and in coastal areas, chiefly in the countryside, but the species is also a successful synanthrope, and is frequent inhabitant of human spaces such as greenhouses, gardens, and parks. The common woodlouse is found in waste grounds, open woodlands, forests, and gardens, as well as in grasslands, scrub, and around buildings. The plurality (22%) of records examined in one study were found on road verges, although it has also been collected from cliff faces and quarries. It most commonly dwells in moist environments under rocks or dead wood, but has also been recorded from litter, human constructions, and garbage. It is especially prevalent in rotting wood, a tendency which allows it to inhabit areas otherwise unfriendly to woodlice such as moorlands. Linnaeus in 1758 noted it was found in houses, but also rotting wood, hibernacula, and walls.

Woodlice may be predated on by toads and newts. According to Stefan Gates, they have a sweet meat with taste similar to crab or shrimp, and considerable umami flavour.

=== Heavy metal accumulation ===
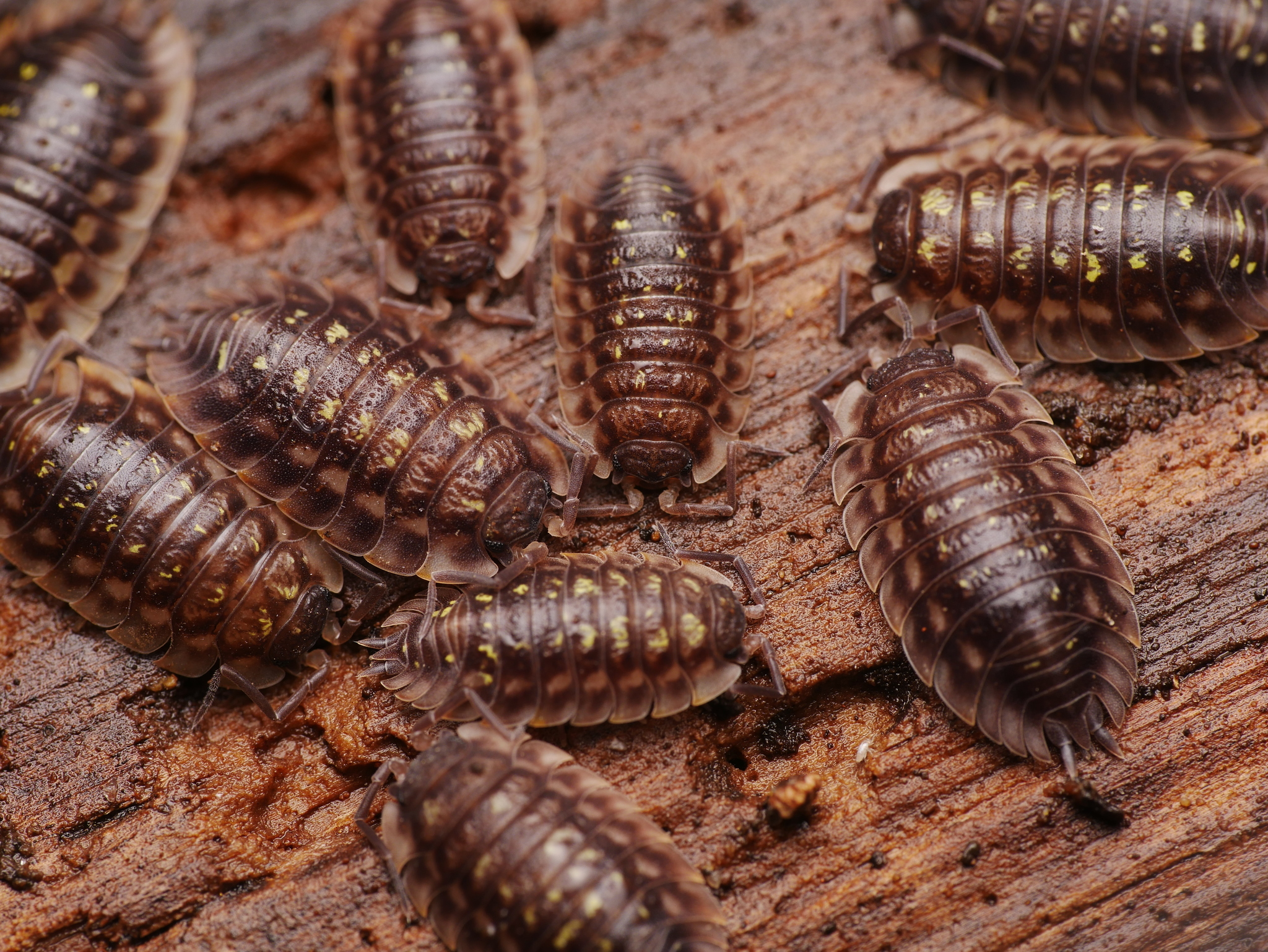
Many Oniscus asellus observed in Berlin.

Isopods are known to store high levels of lead, copper, zinc, and cadmium from contaminated environments in their hepatopancreas, an organ which is believed to be "the most important [...] to monitor the effects of heavy metal pollution" in some isopod species, including O. asellus. In fact, a 1982 paper noted that the concentrations of these four elements in the hepatpancreata of O. asellus living in contaminated environments "are among the highest so far recorded in the soft tissues of any animal". It is thought that retaining non-essential elements such as cadmium takes less energy than preparing to excrete them. It is also believed that woodlice that live in contaminated environments have larger hepatopancreata, allowing them to process more material, based on a positive correlation between the level of contamination of the leaf litter and the dry weight of the hepatopancreata of woodlice living there. A 1990 study comparing the abilities of O. asellus and Porcellio scaber showed that O. asellus dumped zinc rapidly whereas P. scaber retained it, while O. asellus retained much more cadmium and lead – on average about five times as much. Copper was accumulated by both species.

=== Conservation ===
The subspecies O. asellus occidentalis is threatened by population fragmentation and by hybridisation with O. asellus asellus. In Britain, it is classified as Near Threatened.

== See also ==
- Crustacean
- List of woodlice of the British Isles
