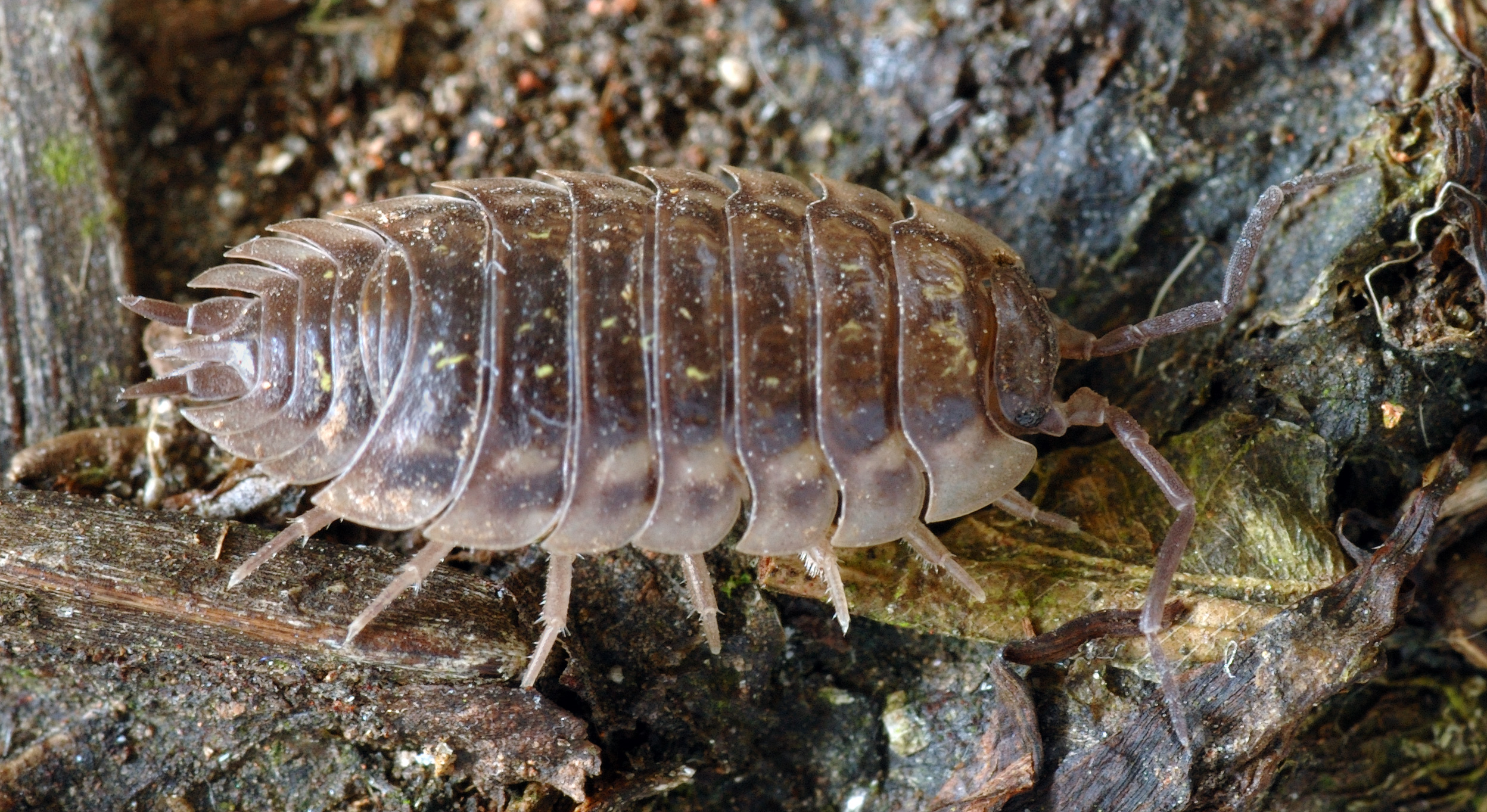
- Oniscus asellus

Scientific classification
- Kingdom: Animalia
- Phylum: Arthropoda
- Class: Malacostraca
- Order: Isopoda
- Suborder: Oniscidea
- Family: Oniscidae
- Genus: Oniscus; Linnaeus, 1758

Species
- Oniscus ancarensis Bilton, 1992; Oniscus asellus Linnaeus, 1758; Oniscus galicianus Bilton, 1997; Oniscus lusitanus Verhoeff, 1908; Oniscus simonii Budde-Lund, 1885

= Oniscus =

Genus of woodlice

Oniscus is a genus of woodlice. It comprises five species, three of which are confined to northwestern Iberia (Oniscus ancarensis, O. galicianus and O. lusitanicus), one to the Pyrenees (Oniscus simonii), and one of which, O. asellus, is widespread across Europe and has been introduced to the Americas .
