= Bragasellus =

Scientific classification
- Kingdom: Animalia
- Phylum: Arthropoda
- Class: Malacostraca
- Order: Isopoda
- Family: Asellidae
- Genus: Bragasellus; Henry & Magniez, 1968

Genus of crustaceans

Bragasellus is a genus of crustaceans in the family Asellidae. It is endemic to Spain and Portugal.

== Species ==
This genus contains the following species:

- Bragasellus afonsoae Henry & Magniez, 1988
- Bragasellus aireyi Henry & Magniez, 1980
- Bragasellus comasi Henry & Magniez, 1976
- Bragasellus comasioides Magnies & Brehier, 2004
- Bragasellus conimbricensis (Braga, 1946)
- Bragasellus cortesi Afonso, 1989
- Bragasellus escolai Henry & Magniez, 1978
- Bragasellus frontellum (Braga, 1964)
- Bragasellus incurvatus Afonso, 1984
- Bragasellus lagari Henry & Magniez, 1973
- Bragasellus lagarioides Henry & Magniez, 1996
- Bragasellus meijersae Henry & Magniez, 1988
- Bragasellus molinai Henry & Magniez, 1988
- Bragasellus notenboomi Henry & Magniez, 1988
- Bragasellus oscari López, 2020
- Bragasellus pauloae (Braga, 1958)
- Bragasellus peltatus (Braga, 1944)
- Bragasellus rouchi Henry & Magniez, 1988
- Bragasellus seabrai (Braga, 1943)
- Bragasellus stocki Henry & Magniez, 1988
