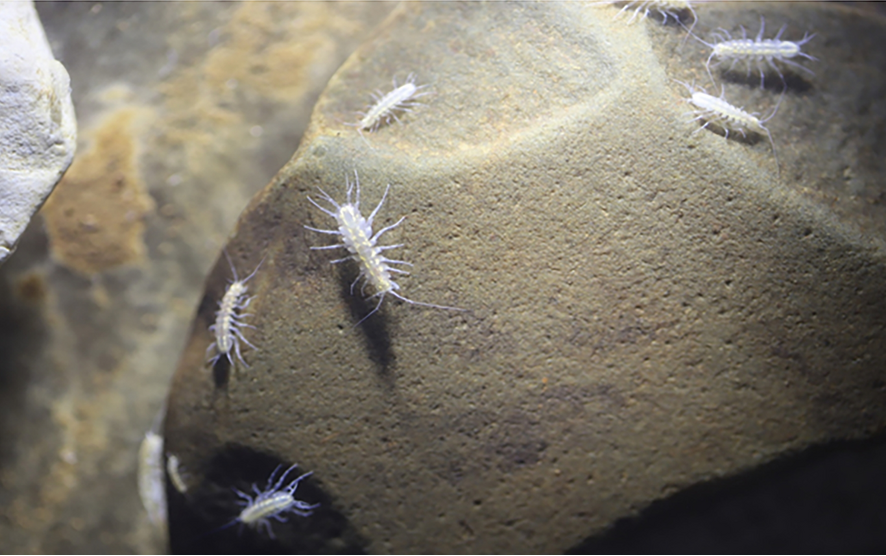
- Proasellus lusitanicus

Scientific classification
- Kingdom: Animalia
- Phylum: Arthropoda
- Clade: Pancrustacea
- Class: Malacostraca
- Order: Isopoda
- Family: Asellidae
- Genus: Proasellus; Dudich, 1925

= Proasellus =

Genus of crustaceans

Proasellus is a genus of isopod crustaceans in the family Asellidae. Two of its species, P. parvulus and P. slovenicus, are Slovenian endemics which are listed as vulnerable species on the IUCN Red List.

Proasellus are freshwater asellotes found near and around the Mediterranean. Most are found in caves, however some are near the hyporheic zone.

It contains the following species:

- Proasellus acutianus Argano & Henry
- Proasellus adriaticus Argano & Pesce, 1979
- Proasellus alavensis Henry & Magniez, 2003
- Proasellus albigensis (Magniez, 1965)
- Proasellus ambracicus Pesce & Argano, 1980
- Proasellus amiterninus Argano & Pesce, 1979
- Proasellus anophtalmus (Karaman, 1934)
- Proasellus aquaecalidae (Racovitza, 1922)
- Proasellus aragonensis Henry & Magniez, 1992
- Proasellus arnautovici (Remy, 1932)
- Proasellus arthrodilus (Braga, 1945)
- Proasellus bagradicus Henry & Magniez, 1972
- Proasellus barduanii Alouf, Henry & Magniez, 1982
- Proasellus basnosanui (Codreanu, 1962)
- Proasellus bellesi Henry & Magniez, 1982
- Proasellus beroni Henry & Magniez, 1968
- Proasellus beticus Henry & Magniez, 1992
- Proasellus boui Henry & Magniez, 1969
- Proasellus burgundus Henry & Magniez, 1969
- Proasellus cantabricus Henry & Magniez, 1968
- Proasellus cavaticus (Leydig, 1871)
- Proasellus chappuisi Henry & Magniez, 1968
- Proasellus chauvini Henry & Magniez, 1978
- Proasellus claudei Henry & Magniez, 1996
- Proasellus coiffaiti Henry & Magniez, 1972
- Proasellus collignoni Magniez & Henry, 2001
- Proasellus comasi Henry & Magniez, 1982
- Proasellus coxalis (Dollfus, 1892)
- Proasellus cretensis Pesce & Argano, 1980
- Proasellus danubialis (Codreanu & Codreanu, 1962)
- Proasellus delhezi Henry & Magniez, 1973
- Proasellus deminutus (Sket, 1959)
- Proasellus dianae Pesce & Argano, 1985
- Proasellus ebrensis Henry & Magniez, 1992
- Proasellus elegans (Codreanu, 1962)
- Proasellus escolai Henry & Magniez, 1982
- Proasellus espanoli Henry & Magniez, 1982
- Proasellus exiguus Afonso, 1983
- Proasellus ezzu Argano & Campanero, 2004
- Proasellus faesulanus Messana & Caselli, 1995
- Proasellus franciscoloi (Chappuis, 1955)
- Proasellus gardinii (Arcangeli, 1942)
- Proasellus gauthieri (Monod, 1924)
- Proasellus gineti Boulanouar, Boutin & Henry, 1991
- Proasellus gjorgjevici Karaman, 1933
- Proasellus gourbaultae Henry & Magniez, 1981
- Proasellus grafi Henry & Magniez, 2003
- Proasellus granadensis Henry & Magniez, 2003
- Proasellus guipuzcoensis Henry & Magniez, 2003
- Proasellus henseni Magniez & Henry, 2001
- Proasellus hercegovinensis (Karaman, 1933)
- Proasellus hermallensis Arcangeli, 1938
- Proasellus hurki Magneiz & Henry, 2001
- Proasellus hypogeus (Racovitza, 1922)
- Proasellus ibericus (Braga, 1946)
- Proasellus infirmus (Birstein, 1936)
- Proasellus intermedius (Sket, 1965)
- Proasellus istrianus (Stammer, 1932)
- Proasellus italicus Dudich, 1925
- Proasellus jaloniacus Henry & Magniez, 1978
- Proasellus karamani Remy, 1934
- Proasellus lagari Henry & Magniez, 1982
- Proasellus lescherae Henry & Magniez, 1978
- Proasellus leysi Magniez & Henry, 2001
- Proasellus ligusticus Bodon & Argano, 1982
- Proasellus linearis (Birstein, 1967)
- Proasellus ljovuschkini (Birstein, 1967)
- Proasellus lusitanicus (Frade, 1938)
- Proasellus lykaonicus Argano & Pesce, 1978
- Proasellus malagensis Henry & Magniez, 2003
- Proasellus maleri Henry, 1977
- Proasellus margalefi Henry & Magniez, 1925
- Proasellus mateusorum Afonso, 1982
- Proasellus meijersae Henry & Magniez, 2003
- Proasellus meridianus (Racovitza, 1919)
- Proasellus micropectinatus Baratti & Messana, 1990
- Proasellus minoicus Pesce & Argano, 1980
- Proasellus monodi (Strouhal, 1942)
- Proasellus monsferratus (Braga, 1948)
- Proasellus montalentii Stoch, Valentino & Volpi, 1996
- Proasellus montenigrinus (Karaman, 1934)
- Proasellus navarrensis Henry & Magniez, 2003
- Proasellus nolli (Karaman, 1952)
- Proasellus notenboomi Henry & Magniez, 1981
- Proasellus orientalis (Sket, 1965)
- Proasellus ortizi Henry & Magniez, 1992
- Proasellus oviedensis Henry & Magniez, 2003
- Proasellus pamphylicus Henry, Magniez & Notenboom, 1996
- Proasellus parvulus (Sket, 1960)
- Proasellus patrizii (Arcangeli, 1952)
- Proasellus pavani (Arcangeli, 1942)
- Proasellus peltatus (Braga, 1944)
- Proasellus phreaticus Sabater & de Manuel, 1988
- Proasellus pisidicus Henry, Magniez & Notenboom, 1996
- Proasellus polychaetus Dudich, 1925
- Proasellus pribenicensis Flasarova, 1977
- Proasellus racovitzai Henry & Magniez, 1972
- Proasellus rectangulatus Afonso, 1982
- Proasellus rectus Afonso, 1982
- Proasellus remyi (Monod, 1932)
- Proasellus rouchi Henry, 1980
- Proasellus ruffoi Argano & Campanero, 2004
- Proasellus similis (Birstein, 1967)
- Proasellus sketi Henry, 1975
- Proasellus slavus (Remy, 1948)
- Proasellus slovenicus (Sket, 1957)
- Proasellus solanasi Henry & Magniez, 1972
- Proasellus soriensis Henry & Magniez, 2003
- Proasellus spelaeus (Racovitza, 1922)
- Proasellus spinipes Afonso, 1979
- Proasellus stocki Henry & Magniez, 2003
- Proasellus strouhali (Karaman, 1955)
- Proasellus synaselloides (Henry, 1963)
- Proasellus thermonyctophilus (Monod, 1924)
- Proasellus valdensis (Chappuis, 1948)
- Proasellus vandeli Magniez & Henry, 1969
- Proasellus variegatus Afonso, 1982
- Proasellus vignai Argano & Pesce, 1979
- Proasellus vizcayensis Henry & Magniez, 2003
- Proasellus vulgaris (Sket, 1965)
- Proasellus walteri (Chappuis, 1948)
- Proasellus winteri Magniez & Henry, 2001
- Proasellus wolfi Dudich, 1925
