= Synasellus =

Scientific classification
- Kingdom: Animalia
- Phylum: Arthropoda
- Class: Malacostraca
- Order: Isopoda
- Family: Asellidae
- Genus: Synasellus; Braga, 1944

Genus of crustaceans

Synasellus is a genus of isopod crustaceans in the family Asellidae. It contains the following species:

- Synasellus albicastrensis Braga, 1960
- Synasellus barcelensis Noodt & Galhano, 1969
- Synasellus bragai Afonso, 1987
- Synasellus bragaianus Henry & Magniez, 1987
- Synasellus brigantinus Braga, 1959
- Synasellus capitatus (Braga, 1968)
- Synasellus dissimilis Afonso, 1987
- Synasellus exiguus Braga, 1944
- Synasellus favaiensis Eiras, 1974
- Synasellus flaviensis Afonso, 1996
- Synasellus fragilis Braga, 1946
- Synasellus henrii Afonso, 1987
- Synasellus hurki Henry & Magniez, 1995
- Synasellus insignis Afonso, 1984
- Synasellus intermedius Afonso, 1985
- Synasellus lafonensis Braga, 1959
- Synasellus leysi Henry & Magniez, 1995
- Synasellus longicauda Braga, 1959
- Synasellus longicornis Afonso, 1978
- Synasellus mariae (Braga, 1942)
- Synasellus mateusi Braga, 1954
- Synasellus meijersae Henry & Magniez, 1987
- Synasellus meirelesi Braga, 1959
- Synasellus minutus Braga, 1967
- Synasellus nobrei Braga, 1967
- Synasellus notenboomi Henry & Magniez, 1987
- Synasellus pireslimai Braga, 1959
- Synasellus pombalensis Afonso, 1987
- Synasellus robusticornis Afonso, 1987
- Synasellus serranus Braga, 1967
- Synasellus tirsensis Afonso, 1987
- Synasellus transmontanus Braga, 1959
- Synasellus valpacensis Afonso, 1996
- Synasellus vidaguensis Afonso, 1996
- Synasellus vilacondensis Afonso, 1987
