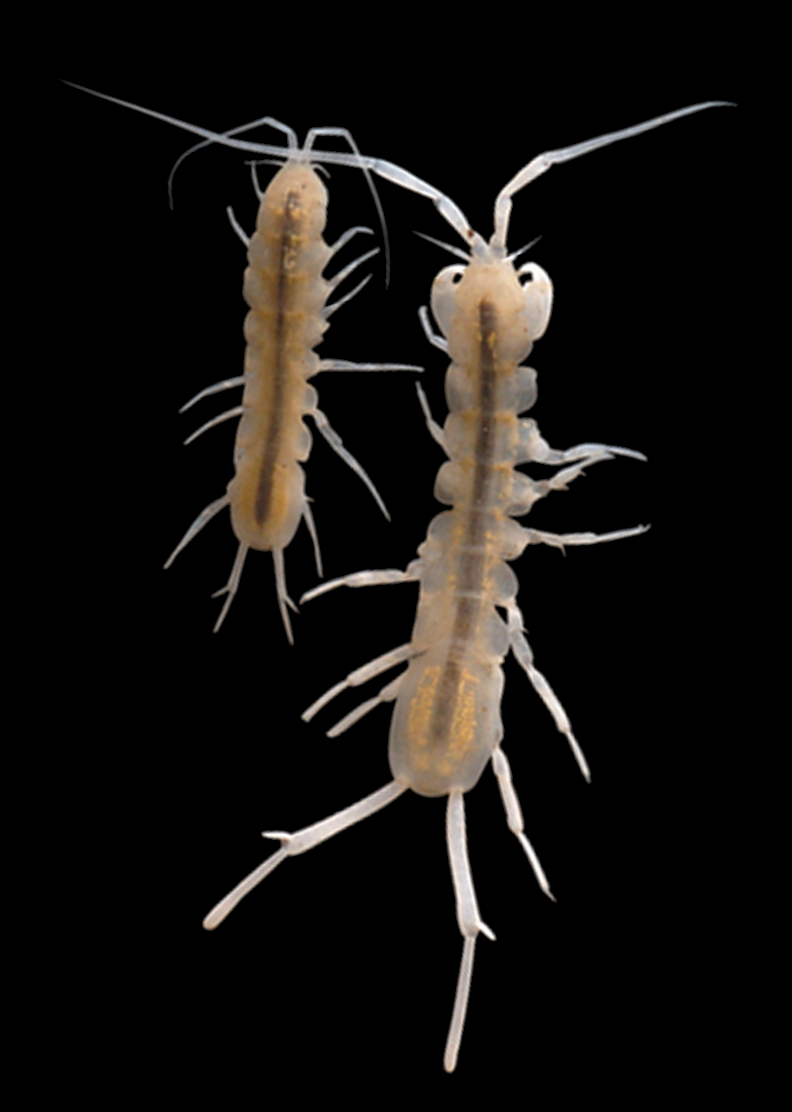
- Caecidotea reddelli

Scientific classification
- Kingdom: Animalia
- Phylum: Arthropoda
- Clade: Pancrustacea
- Class: Malacostraca
- Order: Isopoda
- Family: Asellidae
- Genus: Caecidotea; Packard, 1871

Type species
- Caecidotea stygia Packard, 1871

= Caecidotea =

Genus of crustaceans

Caecidotea is a genus of crustaceans in the family Asellidae. The majority of Caecidotea species are 5-15mm long, but can get up to 30mm. The genus also has a western range, eastern range, and southern range in North America. It contains the following species:

- Caecidotea acuticarpa Mackin & Hubricht, 1940
- Caecidotea adenta (Mackin & Hubricht, 1940)
- Caecidotea alabamensis (Stafford, 1911)
- Caecidotea ancyla (Fleming, 1972)
- Caecidotea antricola Creaser, 1931
- Caecidotea attenuata (Richardson, 1900)
- Caecidotea barri (Steeves, 1965)
- Caecidotea beattyi Lewis & Bowman, 1981
- Caecidotea bicrenata (Steeves, 1963)
- Caecidotea bilineata Lewis & Bowman, 1996
- Caecidotea bowmani Lewis, 1980
- Caecidotea brevicauda (Forbes, 1876)
- Caecidotea cannula (Steeves, 1963)
- Caecidotea carolinensis Lewis & Bowman, 1977
- Caecidotea catachaetus (Fleming & Steeves, 1972)
- Caecidotea chiapas Bowman, 1975
- Caecidotea circulus (Steeves & Holsinger, 1968)
- Caecidotea communis (Say, 1818)
- Caecidotea cumberlandensis Lewis, 2000
- Caecidotea cyrtorhynchus (Fleming & Steeves, 1972)
- Caecidotea dauphina Modlin, 1986
- Caecidotea dentadactyla (Mackin & Hubricht, 1938)
- Caecidotea dimorpha (Mackin & Hubricht, 1940)
- Caecidotea extensolinguala (Fleming, 1972)
- Caecidotea filicispeluncae Bowman & Hobbs, 1983
- Caecidotea fonticulus Lewis, 1983
- Caecidotea forbesi (Williams, 1970)
- Caecidotea foxi (Fleming, 1972)
- Caecidotea franzi (Holsinger & Steeves, 1971)
- Caecidotea fustis Lewis, 1981
- Caecidotea henroti (Bresson, 1955)
- Caecidotea hobbsi (Maloney, 1939)
- Caecidotea holsingeri (Steeves, 1963)
- Caecidotea holti (Fleming, 1972)
- Caecidotea incurva Steeves & Holsinger, 1968
- Caecidotea insula (Julian Lewis, 2017)
- Caecidotea intermedia (Forbes, 1876)
- Caecidotea jordani (Eberly, 1966)
- Caecidotea kendeighi (Steeves & Seidenberg, 1971)
- Caecidotea kenki (Bowman, 1967)
- Caecidotea laticaudata (Williams, 1970)
- Caecidotea lesliei Lewis & Bowman, 1981
- Caecidotea mackini Lewis, Graening, Fenolio & Bergey, 2006
- Caecidotea macropropoda Chase & Blair, 1937
- Caecidotea metcalfi (Fleming, 1972)
- Caecidotea mitchelli Argano, 1977
- Caecidotea montana (Mackin & Hubricht, 1938)
- Caecidotea nickajackensis Packard, 1881
- Caecidotea nodula (Williams, 1970)
- Caecidotea nortoni (Steeves, 1966)
- Caecidotea obtusa (Williams, 1970)
- Caecidotea occidentalis (Williams, 1970)
- Caecidotea oculata Mackin & Hubricht, 1940
- Caecidotea packardi Mackin & Hubricht, 1940
- Caecidotea pasquinii (Argano, 1972)
- Caecidotea paurotrigona (Fleming, 1972)
- Caecidotea phreatica Lewis & Holsinger, 1985
- Caecidotea pricei Levi, 1949
- Caecidotea puebla (Cole & Minckley, 1968)
- Caecidotea putea Lewis 2009
- Caecidotea racovitzai (Williams, 1970)
- Caecidotea recurvata (Steeves, 1963)
- Caecidotea reddelli (Steeves, 1968)
- Caecidotea richardsonae Hay, 1901
- Caecidotea rotunda Bowman & Lewis, 1984
- Caecidotea salemensis Lewis, 1981
- Caecidotea scrupulosa (Williams, 1970)
- Caecidotea scypha (Steeves & Holsinger, 1968)
- Caecidotea serrata (Fleming, 1972)
- Caecidotea simonini (Bresson, 1955)
- Caecidotea simulator Lewis, 1999
- Caecidotea sinuncus (Steeves, 1965)
- Caecidotea spatulata Mackin & Hubricht, 1940
- Caecidotea steevesi (Fleming, 1972)
- Caecidotea stiladactyla Mackin & Hubricht, 1940
- Caecidotea stygia Packard, 1871
- Caecidotea teresae Lewis, 1982
- Caecidotea tomalensis (Harford, 1877)
- Caecidotea tridentata Hungerford, 1922
- Caecidotea vandeli (Bresson, 1955)
- Caecidotea vomeri Argano, 1977
- Caecidotea williamsi Escobar-Briones & Alcocer, 2002
- Caecidotea zullini Argano, 1977
