= Baicalasellus =

Scientific classification
- Kingdom: Animalia
- Phylum: Arthropoda
- Class: Malacostraca
- Order: Isopoda
- Family: Asellidae
- Genus: Baicalasellus; Stammer, 1932

Type species
- Baicalasellus baicalensis

Genus of crustaceans

Baicalasellus is a genus of crustaceans in the family Asellidae. It contains the following species:

- Baicalasellus angarensis (Dybowski, 1884)
- Baicalasellus baicalensis (Grube, 1872)
- Baicalasellus korotnevi (Semenkevich, 1924)
- Baicalasellus minutus (Semenkevich, 1924)
