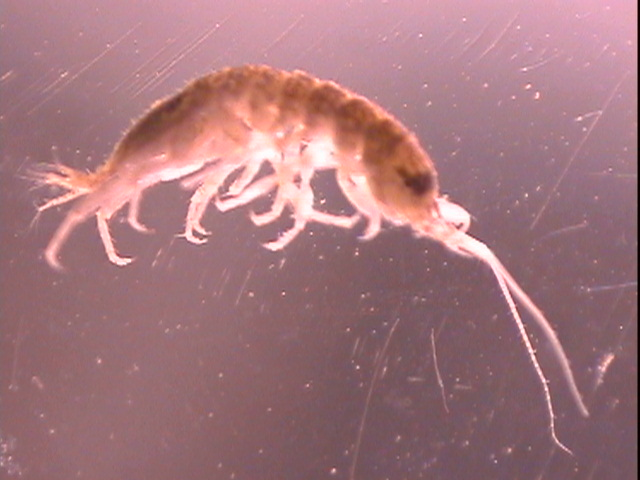

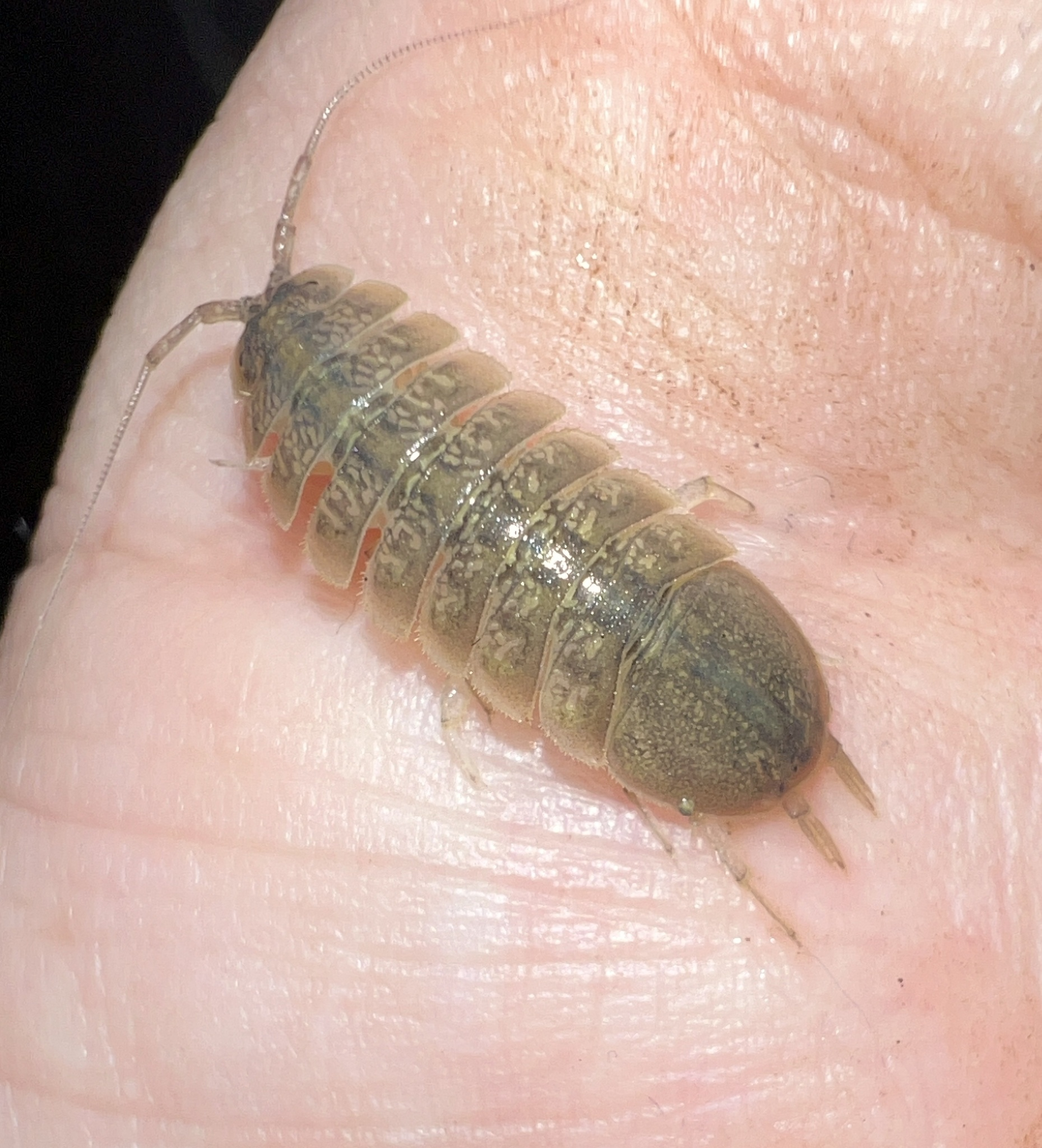

Scientific classification
- Kingdom: Animalia
- Phylum: Arthropoda
- Clade: Pancrustacea
- Class: Malacostraca
- Order: Isopoda
- Family: Asellidae
- Genus: Lirceus; Rafinesque, 1820

Type species
- Lirceus fontinalis Rafinesque, 1820

= Lirceus =

Genus of crustaceans

Lirceus is a genus of isopod crustaceans in the family Asellidae that live in southern Canada and the eastern United States as far west as the Great Plains. Of the 15 species in the genus, two are listed as either endangered (EN) or vulnerable (VU) on the IUCN Red List.

- Lirceus alabamae Hubricht & Mackin, 1949 – Alabama
- Lirceus bicuspidatus Hubricht & Mackin, 1949 – Arkansas
- Lirceus bidentatus Hubricht & Mackin, 1949 – Arkansas
- Lirceus brachyurus (Harger, 1876) – Pennsylvania, Virginia, West Virginia
- Lirceus culveri Estes & Holsinger, 1976 – Virginia
- Lirceus exohylaus Yox, 2024 - Ohio
- Lirceus fontinalis Rafinesque-Schmaltz, 1820 – Ohio, Indiana, Illinois, Kentucky, Tennessee
- Lirceus garmani Hubricht & Mackin, 1949 – Missouri, Arkansas, Kansas, Oklahoma
- Lirceus hargeri Hubricht & Mackin, 1949 – Tennessee, Virginia
- Lirceus hoppinae (Faxon, 1889) – Missouri, Arkansas, Oklahoma
- Lirceus lineatus (Say, 1818) – Canada, eastern United States
- Lirceus louisianae (Mackin & Hubricht, 1938) – Illinois, Missouri, Arkansas, Louisiana
- Lirceus megapodus Hubricht & Mackin, 1949 – Missouri
- Lirceus richardsonae Hubricht & Mackin, 1949 – Ohio
- Lirceus trilobus Hubricht & Mackin, 1949 – Oklahoma
- Lirceus usdagalun Holsinger & Bowman, 1973 – Virginia
