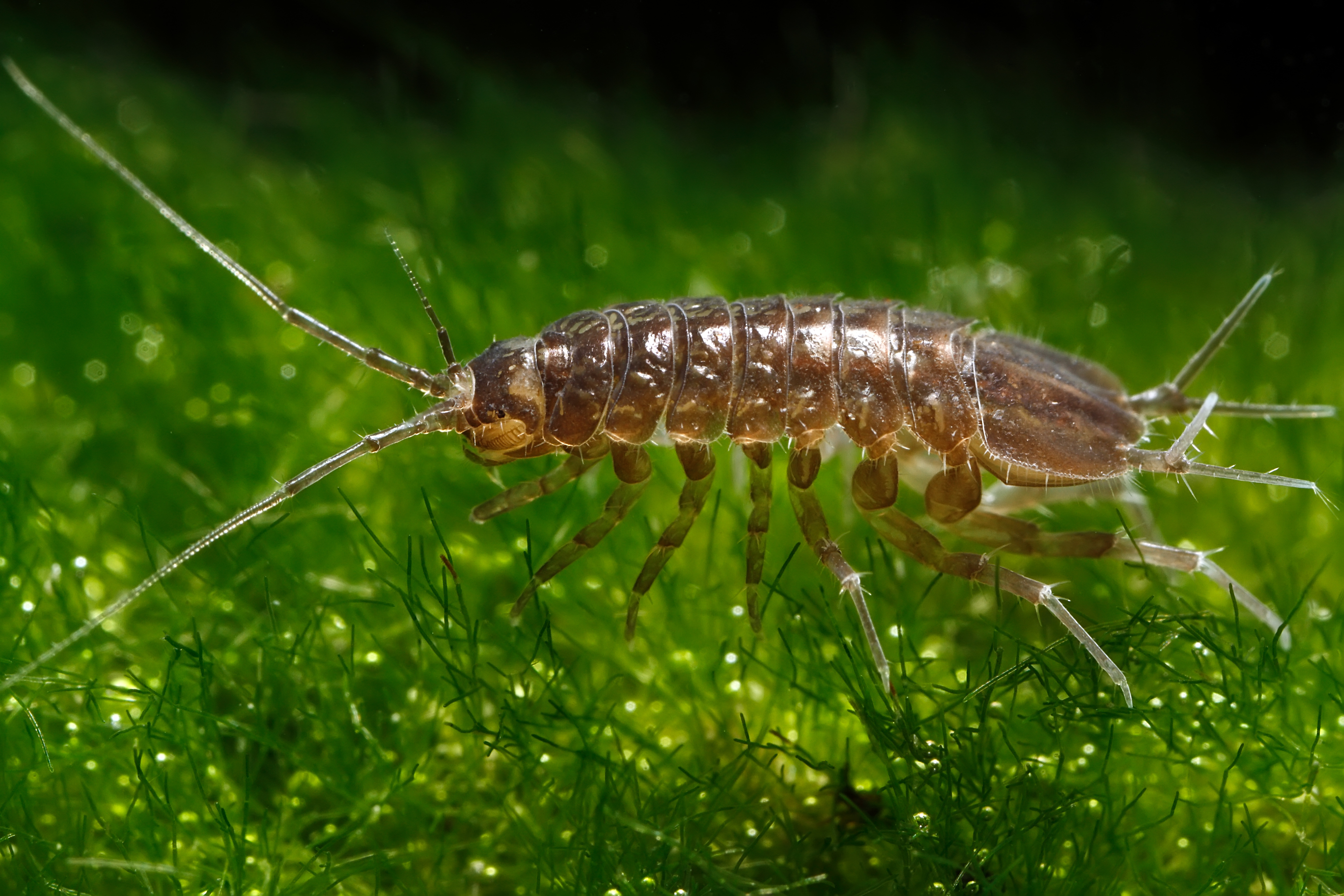
- Asellus aquaticus
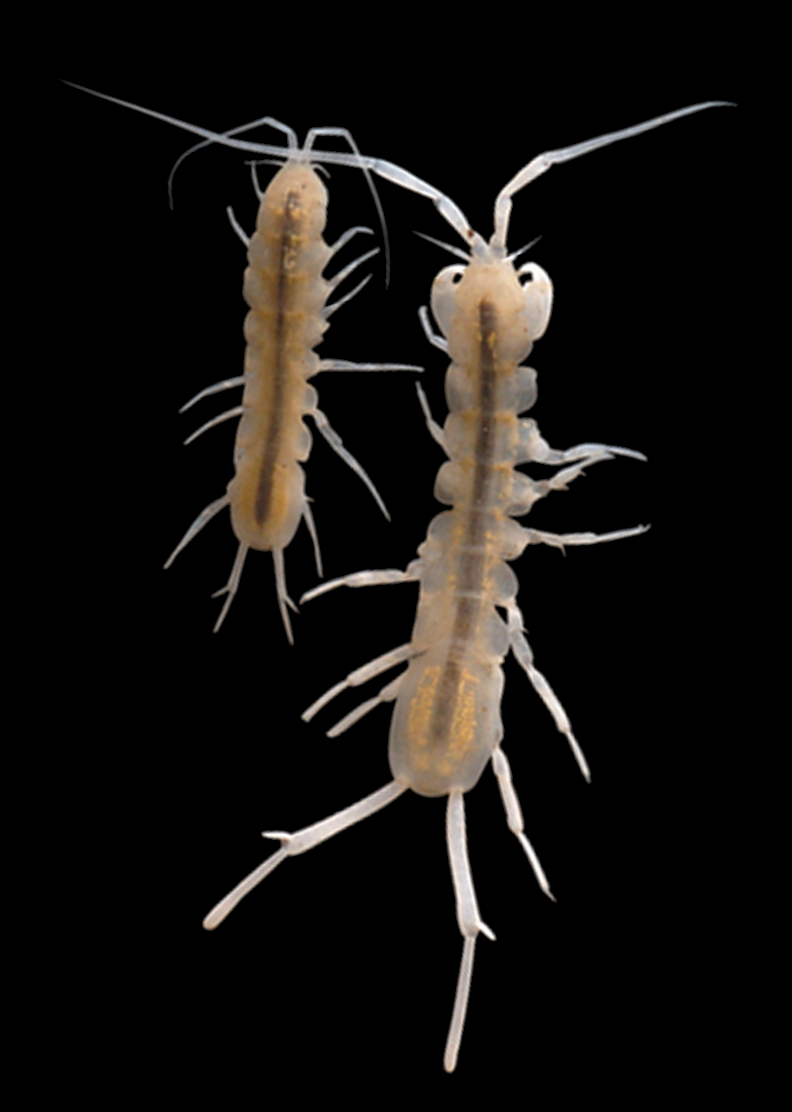
- Caecidotea reddelli

Scientific classification
- Kingdom: Animalia
- Phylum: Arthropoda
- Clade: Pancrustacea
- Class: Malacostraca
- Order: Isopoda
- Suborder: Asellota
- Superfamily: Aselloidea
- Family: Asellidae; Rafinesque, 1815; Latreille, 1802

= Asellidae =

Family of crustaceans

The Asellidae are a family of isopod crustaceans, one of the largest families of freshwater isopods, living in both epigean (surface water) and hypogean (subterranean) habitats in North America, Europe, Asia and North Africa. Members of the family have adapted to underground habitats at least 34 times over the course of their evolution.

== Genera ==
The family includes 19 genera:

- Asellus Geoffroy, 1762
- Baicalasellus Stammer, 1932
- Bragasellus Henry & Magniez, 1968
- Caecidotea Packard, 1871
- Calasellus Bowman, 1981
- Chthonasellus Argano & Messana, 1991
- Columbasellus Lewis, Martin & Wetzer, 2003
- Gallasellus Henry & Magniez, 1977
- Lirceolus Bowman & Longley, 1976
- Lirceus Rafinesque, 1820
- Nipponasellus Matsumoto, 1962
- Phreatoasellus Matsumoto, 1962
- Proasellus Dudich, 1925
- Remasellus Bowman & Sket, 1985
- Salmasellus Bowman, 1975
- Sibirasellus Henry & Magniez, 1993
- Stygasellus Chappuis, 1943
- Synasellus Braga, 1944
- Uenasellus Matsumoto, 1962

=== Phylogeny ===
Partial phylogenetic tree based on genetic data after Saclier et al. 2025:

- Asellidae
  - Salmasellus
  - - - Asellus
      - - Mesoasellus
        - Limnoasellus
    - - - Baicalasellus
        - - Pseudobaicalasellus
          - - - Gallaseullus
              - Conasellus
            - - Caecidotea
              - Lirceus
      - - Proasellus
        - - Synasellus
          - Bragasellus
