= Australocamptus hamondi =

Scientific classification
- Kingdom: Animalia
- Phylum: Arthropoda
- Clade: Pancrustacea
- Class: Copepoda
- Order: Harpacticoida
- Family: Canthocamptidae
- Genus: Australocamptus
- Species: A. hamondi

Binomial name
- Australocamptus hamondi Karanovic, 2004
- Site of holotype (WAM C28575) ETP 130groundwater monitoring bore, Depot Springs Station, WA

Species of crustacean

Australocamptus hamondi is a species of copepod in the family Canthocamptidae, and was first described in 2004 by Tomislav Karanovic. The species epithet honours the British zoologist, Richard Hamond, who spent many years in Australia, working on copepods and other Australian invertebrates.

This subterranean species is found in arid Western Australia, in of one of the larger calcretes in the upper reaches of the Carey palaeochannel in the Yilgarn region.
