= Australocamptus similis =

Scientific classification
- Kingdom: Animalia
- Phylum: Arthropoda
- Clade: Pancrustacea
- Class: Copepoda
- Order: Harpacticoida
- Family: Canthocamptidae
- Genus: Australocamptus
- Species: A. similis

Binomial name
- Australocamptus similis Karanovic, 2004
- Site of holotype (WAM C28582) Wiluna Borefield East, WA

Species of crustacean

Australocamptus similis is a species of copepod in the family Canthocamptidae, and was first described in 2004 by Tomislav Karanovic.

This subterranean species is found in arid Western Australia, in of one of the larger calcretes in the upper reaches of the Carey palaeochannel in the Yilgarn region.
