= Australocamptus diversus =

Scientific classification
- Kingdom: Animalia
- Phylum: Arthropoda
- Clade: Pancrustacea
- Class: Copepoda
- Order: Harpacticoida
- Family: Canthocamptidae
- Genus: Australocamptus
- Species: A. diversus

Binomial name
- Australocamptus diversus Karanovic, 2004
- Site of holotype (WAM C28583) groundwater monitoring bore, Paroo Station, Murchison Region, WA'"`UNIQ--ref-00000002-QINU`"'

Species of crustacean

Australocamptus diversus is a species of copepod in the family Canthocamptidae, and was first described in 2004 by Tomislav Karanovic.

This subterranean species is found in arid Western Australia, in of one of the larger calcretes in the upper reaches of the Carey palaeochannel in the Yilgarn region.
