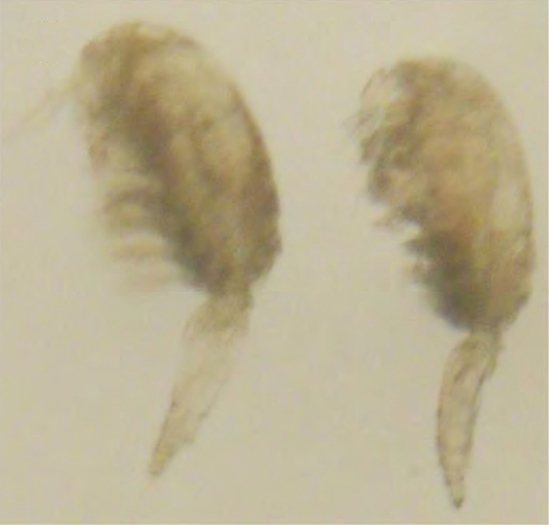
- Two females

Scientific classification
- Kingdom: Animalia
- Phylum: Arthropoda
- Clade: Pancrustacea
- Class: Copepoda
- Order: Cyclopoida
- Family: Cyclopinidae
- Genus: Cyclopina
- Species: C. curtijeju

Binomial name
- Cyclopina curtijeju Karanovic, 2020
- Type site: Gwangchigi Beach, Jeju Island, south coast of South Korea'"`UNIQ--ref-00000003-QINU`"'

= Cyclopina curtijeju =

Species of crustacean

Cyclopina curtijeju is a species of copepod belonging to the order Cyclopoida, in the family, Cyclopinidae. The species was first described in 2020 by zoologist, Tomislav Karanovic. The species epithet, curtijeju, describes this copepod as being short (Latin - curtus) and being found on Jeju.

it has been found in the intertidal zone within the sand of Gwangchigi Beach, Jeju Island. Its body length is 400 μm.
