= Cyclopina soror =

Scientific classification
- Kingdom: Animalia
- Phylum: Arthropoda
- Clade: Pancrustacea
- Class: Copepoda
- Order: Cyclopoida
- Family: Cyclopinidae
- Genus: Cyclopina
- Species: C. soror

Binomial name
- Cyclopina soror Karanovic, 2008
- Holotype site: Cowell, Eyre Peninsula, South Australia

Species of crustacean

Cyclopina soror is a species of copepod belonging to the order Cyclopoida, in the family, Cyclopinidae. The species was first described in 2008 by zoologist, Tomislav Karanovic.

The species is endemic to Australia, and is thought to be found across the IMCRA Spencer Gulf Shelf Province in South Australia. It differs from other Australian Cyclopina species by its females having the outer spine shorter than the inner one, the third endopodal segment of the second, third, and fourth legs having five setae, and having an 11-segmented antennula.
