= Abnitocrella halsei =

Scientific classification
- Kingdom: Animalia
- Phylum: Arthropoda
- Clade: Pancrustacea
- Class: Copepoda
- Order: Harpacticoida
- Family: Ameiridae
- Genus: Abnitocrella
- Species: A. halsei

Binomial name
- Abnitocrella halsei Karanovic, 2006
- Holotype site: Pilbara, Paraburdoo Town Borefield, bore PTO-11, Western Australia'"`UNIQ--ref-00000002-QINU`"'

Crustacean species

Abnitocrella halsei is a species of copepod in the family Ameiridae, and was first described in 2006 by Tomislav Karanovic, The species epithet, halsei, honours Stuart A. Halse who led the survey team.

Adults of this species are found in subterranean waters in the Pilbara.
