= Ameira zahaae =

Scientific classification
- Kingdom: Animalia
- Phylum: Arthropoda
- Clade: Pancrustacea
- Class: Copepoda
- Order: Harpacticoida
- Family: Ameiridae
- Genus: Ameira
- Species: A. zahaae

Binomial name
- Ameira zahaae Karanovic & Cho, 2012
- Type site: Jangbong Island, West Sea'"`UNIQ--ref-00000002-QINU`"'

Species of crustacean

Ameira zahaae is a species of crustacean in the family Ameiridae belonging to the order Harpacticoida, and was first described in 2012 by Tomislav Karanovic and Joo-Lae Cho. The species epithet, zahaae, honours architect Zaha Hadid, who designed Dongdaemun Design Plaza in Seoul.

It has been found in the intertidal waters of Jangbong Island, South Korea in the West Sea.
