= Cyclopina adelphae =

Scientific classification
- Kingdom: Animalia
- Phylum: Arthropoda
- Clade: Pancrustacea
- Class: Copepoda
- Order: Cyclopoida
- Family: Cyclopinidae
- Genus: Cyclopina
- Species: C. adelphae

Binomial name
- Cyclopina adelphae Karanovic, 2008
- Holotype site: Dampier, Western Australia

Species of crustacean

Cyclopina adelphae is a species of copepod belonging to the order Cyclopoida, in the family, Cyclopinidae. The species was first described in 2008 by zoologist, Tomislav Karanovic. Its initial epithet was adelphe.

The species is known only from its type locality in Dampier, Western Australia. It difffers from other Australian Cyclopina species by having its third endopodal segment of second, third, and fourth legs with four setae, and its antennula being 11-segmented.
