= Cyclopina unisetosa =

Scientific classification
- Kingdom: Animalia
- Phylum: Arthropoda
- Clade: Pancrustacea
- Class: Copepoda
- Order: Cyclopoida
- Family: Cyclopinidae
- Genus: Cyclopina
- Species: C. unisetosa

Binomial name
- Cyclopina unisetosa Karanovic, 2008
- Holotype site: Coral Bay, Western Australia

Species of crustacean

Cyclopina unisetosa is a species of copepod belonging to the order Cyclopoida, in the family, Cyclopinidae. The species was first described in 2008 by zoologist, Tomislav Karanovic.

The species is endemic to Australia, and is known only from its type locality within the Central Western Shelf Transition region (an IMCRA region) in Western Australia. It differs from other Australian Cyclopina species by its females having a short copulatory duct, and a 10-segmented antennula.
