= Abnitocrella eberhardi =

Scientific classification
- Kingdom: Animalia
- Phylum: Arthropoda
- Clade: Pancrustacea
- Class: Copepoda
- Order: Harpacticoida
- Family: Ameiridae
- Genus: Abnitocrella
- Species: A. eberhardi

Binomial name
- Abnitocrella eberhardi Karanovic, 2006
- Holotype site: Calamina Well, Mulga Downs Station, Pilbara, Western Australia

Crustacean species

Abnitocrella eberhardi is a species of crustacean in the family Ameiridae belonging to the order Harpacticoida, and was first described in 2006 by Tomislav Karanovic, from adult females only. The species epithet, eberhardi, honours Stefan M. Eberhard, a member of the Pilbara Survey team working on stygofauna.

Adults of this species are found in subterranean waters in the Pilbara.
