= Cyclopina kasignete =

Scientific classification
- Kingdom: Animalia
- Phylum: Arthropoda
- Clade: Pancrustacea
- Class: Copepoda
- Order: Cyclopoida
- Family: Cyclopinidae
- Genus: Cyclopina
- Species: C. kasignete

Binomial name
- Cyclopina kasignete Karanovic, 2008
- Holotype site: Robe, South Australia

Species of crustacean

Cyclopina kasignete is a species of copepod belonging to the order Cyclopoida, in the family, Cyclopinidae. The species was first described in 2008 by zoologist, Tomislav Karanovic.

The species has been found in Robe, South Australia at Venus Bay and Streaky Bay and is endemic to Australia. It differs from other Australian Cyclopina species by its females having a long copulatory duct, and the antennula being 10-segmented.
