= Ameira kimchi =

Scientific classification
- Kingdom: Animalia
- Phylum: Arthropoda
- Clade: Pancrustacea
- Class: Copepoda
- Order: Harpacticoida
- Family: Ameiridae
- Genus: Ameira
- Species: A. kimchi

Binomial name
- Ameira kimchi Karanovic & Cho, 2012
- Type site: Memuld Island'"`UNIQ--ref-00000002-QINU`"'

Species of crustacean

Ameira kimchi is a species of crustacean in the family Ameiridae belonging to the order Harpacticoida, and was first described in 2012 by Tomislav Karanovic and Joo-Lae Cho. The species epithet refers to kimchi, a traditional food of the Korean people.

It has been found in the littoral waters of Memuld Island, South Korea in the South Sea.
