= Ameira longipes =

Scientific classification
- Kingdom: Animalia
- Phylum: Arthropoda
- Clade: Pancrustacea
- Class: Copepoda
- Order: Harpacticoida
- Family: Ameiridae
- Genus: Ameira
- Species: A. longipes

Binomial name
- Ameira longipes Boeck, 1865

Species of crustacean

Ameira longipes is a species of crustacean in the family Ameiridae belonging to the order Harpacticoida, and was first described in 1865 by Jonas Axel Boeck. It is the type species of the genus.
