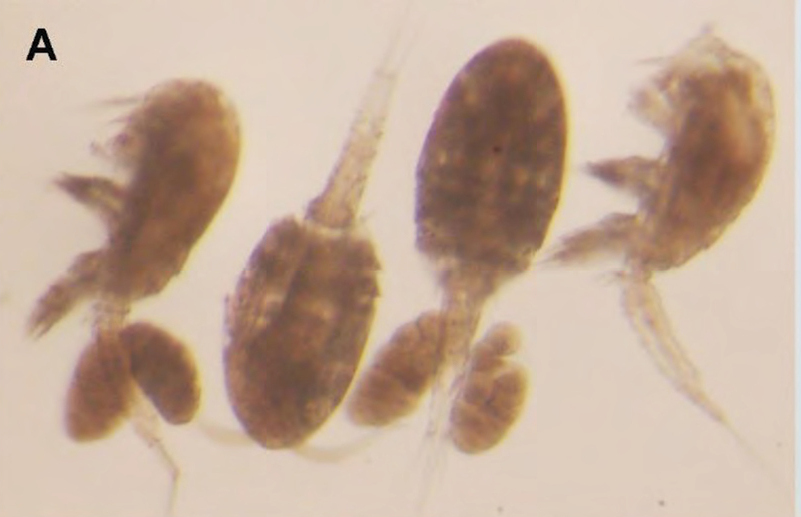
- four females (2 oviparous)

Scientific classification
- Kingdom: Animalia
- Phylum: Arthropoda
- Clade: Pancrustacea
- Class: Copepoda
- Order: Cyclopoida
- Family: Cyclopinidae
- Genus: Cyclopina
- Species: C. busanensis

Binomial name
- Cyclopina busanensis Karanovic, 2020
- Type site: South Korea, South Coast, Busan, Sonjong Beach'"`UNIQ--ref-00000003-QINU`"'

= Cyclopina busanensis =

Species of crustacean

Cyclopina busanensis is a species of copepod belonging to the order Cyclopoida, and the family, Cyclopinidae. The species was first described in 2020 by zoologist, Tomislav Karanovic. The species epithet, busanensis, describes this copepod as being found near Busan.

it has been found in the intertidal zone within the sand of sandy beaches near Busan, South Korea.
