= Abnitocrella =

Scientific classification
- Kingdom: Animalia
- Phylum: Arthropoda
- Class: Copepoda
- Order: Harpacticoida
- Family: Ameiridae
- Genus: Abnitocrella; Karanovic, 2006

Type species
- Abnitocrella halsei Karanovic, 2006

Genus of crustacea

Abnitocrella is a genus of crustaceans in the family Ameiridae belonging to the order Harpacticoida, and was first described in 2006 by Tomislav Karanovic. The genus name, Abnitocrella, derives from the Latin preposition "ab" ( "from") and the generic name Nitocrella. The type species is Abnitocrella halsei.

== Description ==
Abnitocrella species differ from Nitocrella species by the very reduced fifth leg, by the reduced armature of the antennal exopod, and by the male's loss of the sixth leg.

== Species ==
Species accepted by WoRMS

- Abnitocrella eberhardi Karanovic, 2006
- Abnitocrella halsei Karanovic, 2006
