= Cyclopina kasis =

Scientific classification
- Kingdom: Animalia
- Phylum: Arthropoda
- Clade: Pancrustacea
- Class: Copepoda
- Order: Cyclopoida
- Family: Cyclopinidae
- Genus: Cyclopina
- Species: C. kasis

Binomial name
- Cyclopina kasis Karanovic, 2008
- Holotype site: Tin Can Bay, Queensland

Species of crustacean

Cyclopina kasis is a species of copepod belonging to the order Cyclopoida, in the family, Cyclopinidae. The species was first described in 2008 by zoologist, Tomislav Karanovic.

The species is endemic to Australia, and has been found only at Tin Can Bay in Queensland It differs from other Australian Cyclopina species by its females having a 9-segmented antennula.
