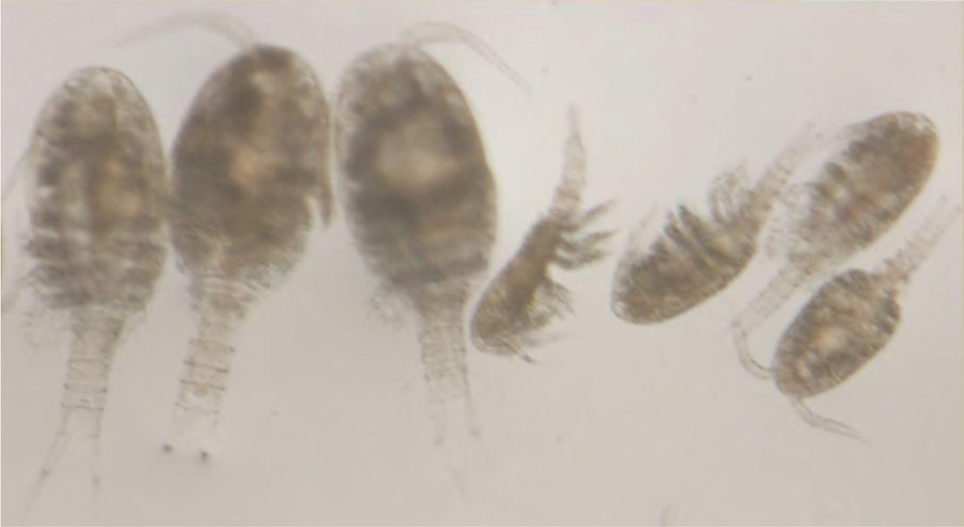
- Three females & four males

Scientific classification
- Kingdom: Animalia
- Phylum: Arthropoda
- Clade: Pancrustacea
- Class: Copepoda
- Order: Cyclopoida
- Family: Cyclopinidae
- Genus: Cyclopina
- Species: C. koreana

Binomial name
- Cyclopina koreana Karanovic, 2020
- Type site: Gangneung, east coast of South Korea'"`UNIQ--ref-00000003-QINU`"'

= Cyclopina koreana =

Species of crustacean

Cyclopina koreana is a species of copepod belonging to the order Cyclopoida, in the family, Cyclopinidae. The species was first described in 2020 by zoologist, Tomislav Karanovic. The species epithet, koreana, references South Korea.

it has been found in the intertidal zone within the sand of a small beach in Gangneung, South Korea. The female body length is from 620 to 635 μm.
