= Nitocrella slovenica =

Conservation status
- Vulnerable (IUCN 2.3)

Scientific classification
- Kingdom: Animalia
- Phylum: Arthropoda
- Class: Copepoda
- Order: Harpacticoida
- Family: Ameiridae
- Genus: Nitocrella
- Species: N. slovenica

Binomial name
- Nitocrella slovenica Petkovski, 1959

Species of crustacean

Nitocrella slovenica is a species of harpacticoid copepod in the family Ameiridae.

The IUCN conservation status of Nitocrella slovenica is "VU", vulnerable. The species faces a high risk of endangerment in the medium term. The IUCN status was reviewed in 1996.
