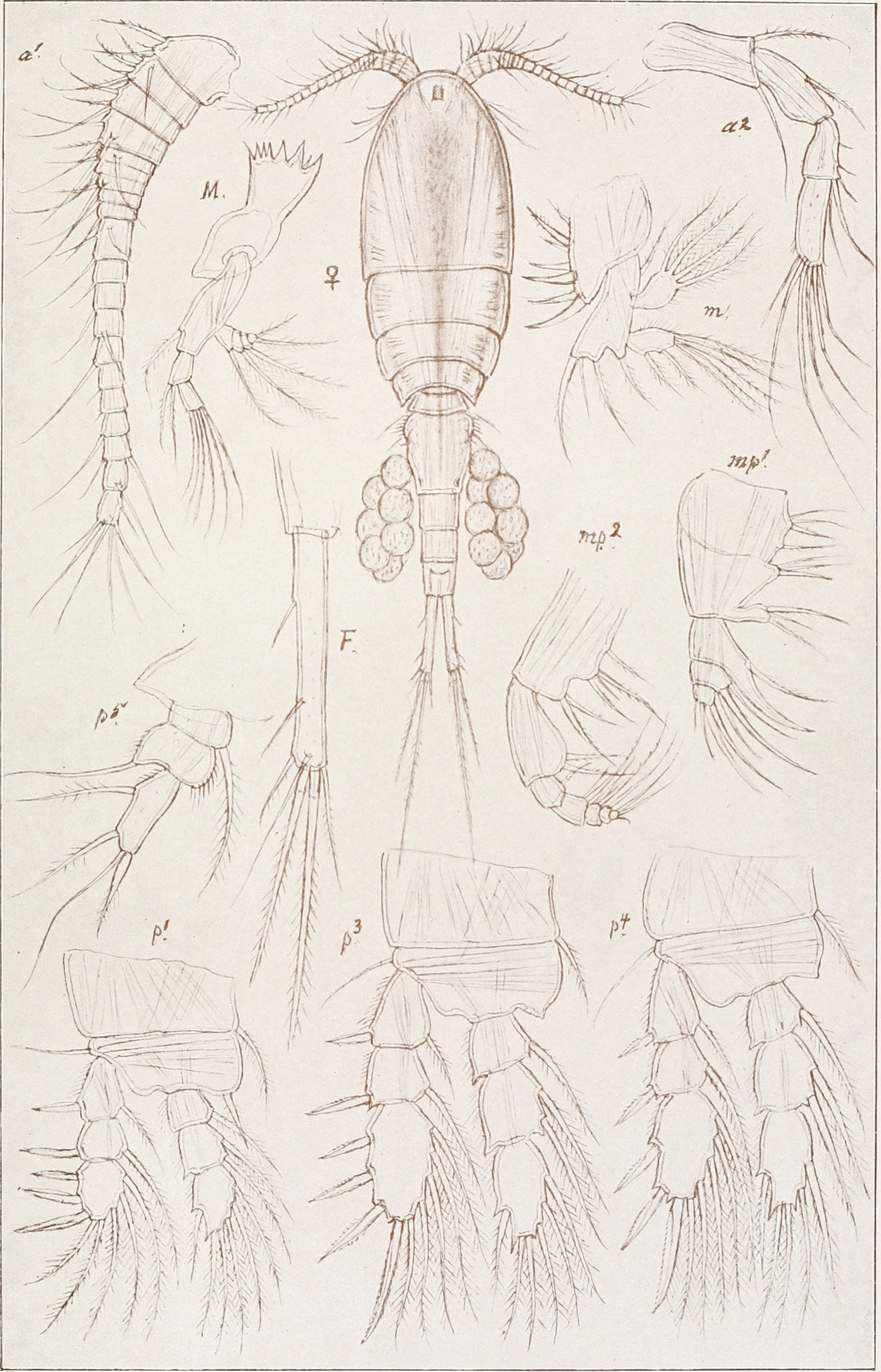
- Cyclopina elegans, Scott., Illustration in "An account of the Crustacea of Norway, with short descriptions and figures of all the species", by Georg Ossian Sars, 1913

Scientific classification
- Domain: Eukaryota
- Kingdom: Animalia
- Phylum: Arthropoda
- Class: Copepoda
- Order: Cyclopoida
- Family: Hemicyclopinidae
- Genus: Cyclopinodes
- Species: C. elegans

Binomial name
- Cyclopinodes elegans (T. Scott, 1894)

Synonyms
- Cyclopina elegans T. Scott, 1894; Cyclopinodes elegans (Sars, 1920); Cyclopinoides elegans (T. Scott, 1894)

= Cyclopinodes elegans =

Species of crustacean

Cyclopinodes elegans is a species of marine copepod in the family Hemicyclopinidae. It is found in Scotland.
