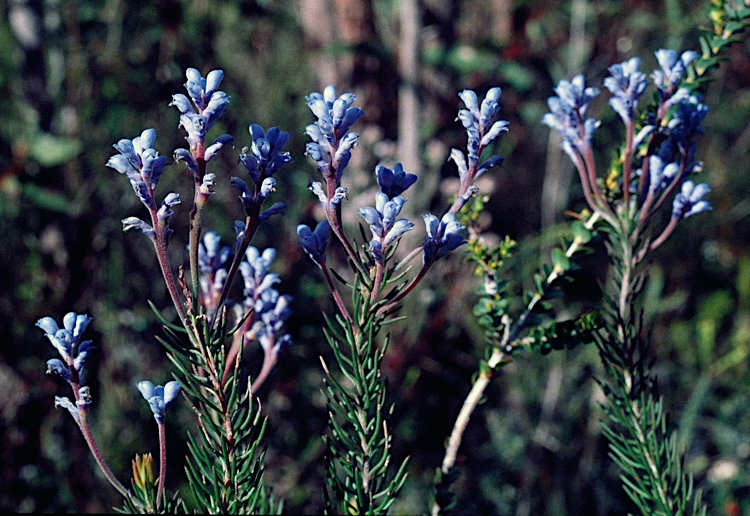
- Subspecies dorrienii in the Stirling Range National Park

Scientific classification
- Kingdom: Plantae
- Clade: Tracheophytes
- Clade: Angiosperms
- Clade: Eudicots
- Order: Proteales
- Family: Proteaceae
- Genus: Conospermum
- Species: C. coerulescens

Binomial name
- Conospermum coerulescens F.Muell.

= Conospermum coerulescens =

Species of shrub native to Australia

Conospermum coerulescens is a species of flowering plant in the family Proteaceae and is endemic to the south of Western Australia. It is an erect shrub with thread-like to narrowly lance-shaped leaves and spikes of up to 10 greyish-blue to deep blue, hairy flowers.

== Description ==
Conospermum coerulescens is an erect shrub that typically grows to a height of up to 1 m (3 ft 3 in). It has ascending, thread-like to narrowly lance-shaped leaves 4–25 mm (0.16–0.98 in) long, 0.4–1.5 mm (0.016–0.059 in) wide. The flowers are arranged in leaf axils in a spike of up to 10 on a peduncle 7–60 mm (0.28–2.36 in) long. The bracteoles are blue, egg-shaped to more or less round, 1.5–3 mm (0.059–0.118 in) long and wide, and hairy. The perianth is grey-blue to deep blue, forming a tube 1.5–3.5 mm (0.059–0.138 in) long. The upper lip is 3–4.6 mm (0.12–0.18 in) long, the lower lip joined for 2.2–3.2 mm (0.087–0.126 in) long with lobes 0.5–1.4 mm (0.020–0.055 in) long and 0.4–0.8 mm (0.016–0.031 in) wide. Flowering time depends on subspecies and the fruit is a nut 2.0–2.8 mm (0.079–0.110 in) long and 1.8–2.4 mm (0.071–0.094 in) wide with cream-coloured hairs.

== Taxonomy ==
Conospermum coerulescens was first formally described in 1859 by Ferdinand von Mueller in his Fragmenta Phytographiae Australiae from specimens collected by George Maxwell near the Salt River. The specific epithet (coerulescens) means 'becoming blue'.

In 1995, Eleanor Marion Bennett described two subspecies of C. coerulescens, and the names, and that of the autonym, are accepted by the Australian Plant Census:

- Conospermum coerulescens subsp. adpressum E.M.Benn. has leaves that are ascending, spreading but not curved or pressed against the stem, mid-blue flowers, bracteoles with several short hairs, and flowers in September and October.
- Conospermum coerulescens F.Muell. subsp. coerulescens (the autonym) has spreading leaves, greyish-blue flowers with woolly hairs, and bracteoles densely covered with white, woolly hairs.
- Conospermum coerulescens subsp. dorrienii E.M.Benn. has leaves that are cured inwards, S-shaped, upwardly oriented and overlapping, bright blue flowers, bracteoles with a few short hairs, and flowers from July to November.

== Distribution and habitat ==
Conospermum coerulescens is found on sand plains and low hills, and is widespread in the Esperance Plains, Jarrah Forest and Mallee bioregions where it grows in sandy to loamy soils often over gravelly laterite.

Subspecies adpressum is found on sandplains and low hills between Albany, the Stirling Range National Park and Mount Manypeaks in the Esperance Plains and Jarrah Forest bioregions.

Subspecies coerulescens is poorly known from near Albany and Bremer Bay.

Subspecies dorrienii grows in sand, stony soil and gravel on rocky slopes in the Stirling Range National Park.

== Conservation status ==
Subspecies adpressum and subsp. dorrienii are listed as "not threatened" by the Government of Western Australia Department of Biodiversity, Conservation and Attractions, but supsp. coerulescens is listed as "Priority One" by the Government of Western Australia, meaning that it is known from only one or a few locations which are potentially at risk.
