= Kikuchicamptus incurvisetosus =

Scientific classification
- Kingdom: Animalia
- Phylum: Arthropoda
- Class: Copepoda
- Order: Harpacticoida
- Family: Canthocamptidae
- Genus: Kikuchicamptus
- Species: K. incurvisetosus

Binomial name
- Kikuchicamptus incurvisetosus Chang & Ishida, 2001

Synonyms
- Canthocamptus incurvisetosus

Species of crustacean

Kikuchicamptus incurvisetosus is a species of freshwater copepod in the family Canthocamptidae. It is endemic to Korea.

It was first described by Chang Cheon Young and Teruo Ishida in 2001, but was transferred in 2022 to the new genus, Kikuchicamptus, by Alexander Alexeevich Novikov and Dayana Sharafutdinova on the basis of morphological differences.

== Description ==
This freshwater copepod lives in fallen leaves in streams and springs. The female is from 0.69 to 0.73 mm long and the male is slightly smaller. It is common in the mountain waters of Korea.

This species differs from similar species by its outer caudal setae of the caudal peduncle being twisted inward.

== Distribution ==
It is found in the central and southern regions of Korea, but not the Odaesan area nor on Jeju Island.
