= Archinitocrella =

Scientific classification
- Kingdom: Animalia
- Phylum: Arthropoda
- Class: Copepoda
- Order: Harpacticoida
- Family: Ameiridae
- Genus: Archinitocrella; Karanovic, 2006
- Species: A. newmanensis

Binomial name
- Archinitocrella newmanensis Karanovic, 2006
- Holotype site: Pilbara, Newman Borefield, bore PTO-11, Western Australia'"`UNIQ--ref-00000002-QINU`"'

Crustacean species

Archinitocrella newmanensis is a species of copepod in the family Ameiridae, and was first described in 2006 by Tomislav Karanovic, The species epithet, newmanensis, describes the species as being found at a Newman Bore. The genus, Archinitocrella, was also described in this paper based on this species, which currently contains just the one species

Adults of the species are found in subterranean waters in the Pilbara.
