= Elaphoidella amabilis =

Conservation status
- Vulnerable (IUCN 2.3)

Scientific classification
- Kingdom: Animalia
- Phylum: Arthropoda
- Class: Copepoda
- Order: Harpacticoida
- Family: Canthocamptidae
- Genus: Elaphoidella
- Species: E. amabilis

Binomial name
- Elaphoidella amabilis Ishida, 1993

Species of crustacean

Elaphoidella amabilis is a species of copepod in the family Canthocamptidae. Its type locality is Norway.

The IUCN conservation status of Elaphoidella amabilis is "VU", vulnerable. The species faces a high risk of endangerment in the medium term. The IUCN status was reviewed in 1996.
