= Fibulacamptus gracilior =

Conservation status
- Vulnerable (IUCN 2.3)

Scientific classification
- Kingdom: Animalia
- Phylum: Arthropoda
- Class: Copepoda
- Order: Harpacticoida
- Family: Canthocamptidae
- Genus: Fibulacamptus
- Species: F. gracilior

Binomial name
- Fibulacamptus gracilior Hamond, 1987

Species of crustacean

Fibulacamptus gracilior is a species of harpacticoid copepod in the family Canthocamptidae. It is found in Australia.

The IUCN conservation status of Fibulacamptus gracilior is "VU", vulnerable. The species faces a high risk of endangerment in the medium term. The IUCN status was reviewed in 1996.
