= Ameira =

Scientific classification
- Kingdom: Animalia
- Phylum: Arthropoda
- Class: Copepoda
- Order: Harpacticoida
- Family: Ameiridae
- Genus: Ameira; Boeck, 1865

Type species
- Ameira longipes Boeck, 1865

Genus of crustacea

Ameira is a genus of crustaceans in the family Ameiridae belonging to the order Harpacticoida, and was first described in 1865 by Jonas Axel Boeck. The type species is Ameira longipes.

== Species ==
Species accepted by WoRMS are:

- Ameira bathyalis Becker & Schriever, 1979
- Ameira breviremis Brady, 1905
- Ameira confluens Ranga Reddy, 1984
- Ameira curticornis Brady & Robertson, 1876
- Ameira curviseta Willey, 1929
- Ameira divergens Nicholls, 1939
- Ameira exigua Scott T., 1894
- Ameira faroerensis Schriever, 1982
- Ameira gracilimana (Giesbrecht, 1902)
- Ameira grandis Nicholls, 1939
- Ameira kimchi Karanovic & Cho, 2012
- Ameira listensis Mielke, 1973
- Ameira littoralis Nicholls, 1939
- Ameira longipes Boeck, 1865
- Ameira longispina Gee, 2009
- Ameira mediterranea Kunz, 1975
- Ameira minor Thompson I.C. & Scott A., 1903
- Ameira minuta Boeck, 1865
- Ameira nana Willey, 1935
- Ameira parascotti Chislenko, 1977
- Ameira parvula (Claus, 1866)
- Ameira parvuloides Lang, 1965
- Ameira pusilla Scott T., 1903
- Ameira reducta Petkovski, 1954
- Ameira scotti Sars G.O., 1911
- Ameira sibogae Scott A., 1909
- Ameira simulans Scott T., 1912
- Ameira speciosa Monard, 1935
- Ameira spinipes Nicholls, 1939
- Ameira tenuicornis Scott T., 1902
- Ameira trisetosa Krishnaswamy, 1957
- Ameira usitata Klie, 1950
- Ameira venthami Yildiz & Karaytuğ, 2024
- Ameira wellsi Yildiz & Karaytuğ, 2024
- Ameira zahaae Karanovic & Cho, 2012
