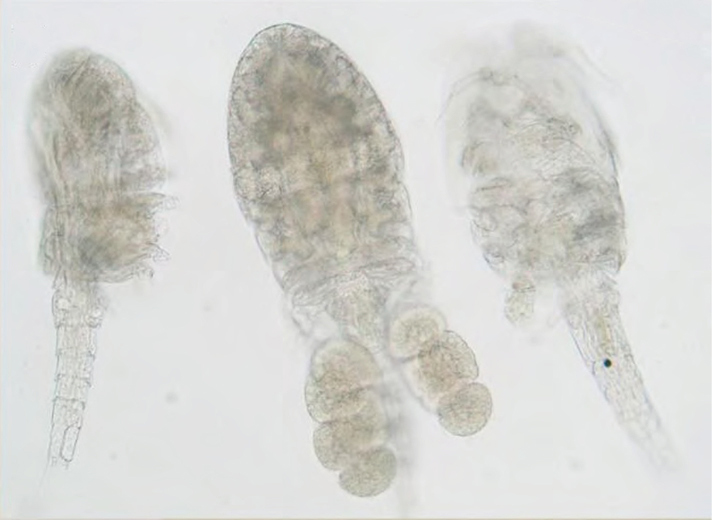
- two females (one ovigerous) & one male

Scientific classification
- Kingdom: Animalia
- Phylum: Arthropoda
- Clade: Pancrustacea
- Class: Copepoda
- Order: Cyclopoida
- Family: Cyclopinidae
- Genus: Cyclopina
- Species: C. wido

Binomial name
- Cyclopina wido Karanovic, 2020
- Type site: Wido Island, west coast of South Korea

= Cyclopina wido =

Species of crustacean

Cyclopina wido is a species of copepod belonging to the order Cyclopoida, in the family, Cyclopinidae. The species was first described in 2020 by zoologist, Tomislav Karanovic. The species epithet, wido, references the type locality.

It has been found in the intertidal zone within the sand of a small beach in Wido, South Korea. The body length of the female type species is 327 μm, and 323 μm.
