= Ceuthonectes rouchi =

Conservation status
- Vulnerable (IUCN 2.3)

Scientific classification
- Kingdom: Animalia
- Phylum: Arthropoda
- Class: Copepoda
- Order: Harpacticoida
- Family: Canthocamptidae
- Genus: Ceuthonectes
- Species: C. rouchi

Binomial name
- Ceuthonectes rouchi Petkovski, 1984

Species of crustacean

Ceuthonectes rouchi is a species of harpacticoid copepod in the family Canthocamptidae. It is found in Europe.

The IUCN conservation status of Ceuthonectes rouchi is "VU", vulnerable. The species faces a high risk of endangerment in the medium term. The IUCN status was reviewed in 1996.
