= Australocamptus =

Scientific classification
- Kingdom: Animalia
- Phylum: Arthropoda
- Clade: Pancrustacea
- Class: Copepoda
- Order: Harpacticoida
- Family: Canthocamptidae
- Genus: Australocamptus; Karanovic, 2004

Type species
- Australocamptus hamondi Karanovic, 2004

Genus of crustaceans

Australocamptus is a genus of copepods in the family Canthocamptidae, and was first described by Tomislav Karanovic in 2004. The type species is Australocamptus hamondi.

The following species are accepted by WoRMS:

- Australocamptus diversus Karanovic, 2004
- Australocamptus hamondi Karanovic, 2004
- Australocamptus similis Karanovic, 2004
