= Cyclopina amita =

Scientific classification
- Kingdom: Animalia
- Phylum: Arthropoda
- Clade: Pancrustacea
- Class: Copepoda
- Order: Cyclopoida
- Family: Cyclopinidae
- Genus: Cyclopina
- Species: C. amita

Binomial name
- Cyclopina amita Karanovic, 2008
- Holotype site: Dampier, Western Australia

Species of crustacean

Cyclopina amita is a species of copepod belonging to the order Cyclopoida, in the family, Cyclopinidae. The species was first described in 2008 by zoologist, Tomislav Karanovic.

The species has been found in Dampier, Western Australia, and Karratha, Western Australia. It differs from other Australian Cyclopina species by its females having the outer spine on the fifth leg more than twice as long as on the inner one, the third endopodal segment of second, third, and fourth legs having five setae, and the antennula being 11-segmented.
