= Cletocamptoides helobius =

Scientific classification
- Domain: Eukaryota
- Kingdom: Animalia
- Phylum: Arthropoda
- Class: Copepoda
- Order: Harpacticoida
- Family: Canthocamptidae
- Genus: Cletocamptoides
- Species: C. helobius

Binomial name
- Cletocamptoides helobius (Fleeger, 1980)

Synonyms
- Cletocamptus helobius Fleeger, 1980

Species of crustacean

Cletocamptoides helobius is a species of copepod found in brackish waters of North America first described by John W. Fleeger in 1980. The species has been used in a study of the evolution of the DNA of the related species Cletocamptus deitersi.
