= Elaphoidella slovenica =

Scientific classification
- Domain: Eukaryota
- Kingdom: Animalia
- Phylum: Arthropoda
- Class: Copepoda
- Order: Harpacticoida
- Family: Canthocamptidae
- Genus: Elaphoidella
- Species: E. slovenica

Binomial name
- Elaphoidella slovenica Wells, 2007

Species of crustacean

Elaphoidella slovenica is a species of harpacticoid copepod in the family Canthocamptidae. It is found in Europe.
