= Nitokra =

Scientific classification
- Domain: Eukaryota
- Kingdom: Animalia
- Phylum: Arthropoda
- Class: Copepoda
- Order: Harpacticoida
- Family: Ameiridae
- Genus: Nitokra; Boeck, 1865

Genus of crustaceans

Nitokra is a genus of copepods belonging to the family Ameiridae.

The genus has cosmopolitan distribution.

Species:

- Nitocra arctolongus Shen & Tai, 1973
- Nitocra balli
