= Elaphoidella jeanneli =

Conservation status
- Vulnerable (IUCN 2.3)

Scientific classification
- Kingdom: Animalia
- Phylum: Arthropoda
- Class: Copepoda
- Order: Harpacticoida
- Family: Canthocamptidae
- Genus: Elaphoidella
- Species: E. jeanneli

Binomial name
- Elaphoidella jeanneli (Chappuis, 1928)

Species of crustacean

Elaphoidella jeanneli is a species of harpacticoid copepod in the family Canthocamptidae. It is found in Europe.

The IUCN conservation status of Elaphoidella jeanneli is "VU", vulnerable. The species faces a high risk of endangerment in the medium term. The IUCN status was reviewed in 1996.
