= Allocyclopina =

Scientific classification
- Kingdom: Animalia
- Phylum: Arthropoda
- Class: Copepoda
- Order: Cyclopoida
- Family: Cyclopinidae
- Genus: Allocyclopina; Kiefer, 1954

Type species
- Allocyclopina madagassica Kiefer, 1954

Genus of crustaceans

Allocyclopina is a genus of marine copepods belonging to the order Cyclopoida, and the family, Cyclopinidae. The genus was first described in 1954 by German zoologist, Friedrich Kiefer. The type species is Allocyclopina madagassica Kiefer, 1954.

== Species ==
Species accepted by WoRMS:

- Allocyclopina ambigua Kiefer, 1960
- Allocyclopina australiensis Karanovic, 2008
- Allocyclopina inopinata Defaye & Ranga Reddy, 2008
- Allocyclopina madagassica Kiefer, 1954
