= Cletocamptus =

Scientific classification
- Domain: Eukaryota
- Kingdom: Animalia
- Phylum: Arthropoda
- Class: Copepoda
- Order: Harpacticoida
- Family: Canthocamptidae
- Genus: Cletocamptus; Schmankevitch, 1875

Genus of crustaceans

Cletocamptus is a genus of marine and brackish-water copepods, containing the following species:

- Cletocamptus affinis Kiefer, 1957
- Cletocamptus albuquerquensis (Herrick, 1894)
- Cletocamptus assimilis Gómez & Gee, 2009
- Cletocamptus cecsurirensis Gómez, Scheihing & Labarca, 2007
- Cletocamptus chappuisi Gómez, Gerber & Fuentes-Reinés, 2017
- Cletocamptus cubaensis Apostolov, 2023
- Cletocamptus deborahdexterae Gomez, Fleeger, Rocha-Olivares & Foltz, 2004
- Cletocamptus dominicanus Kiefer, 1934
- Cletocamptus feei (Shen, 1956)
- Cletocamptus fourchensis Gómez, Fleeger, Rocha-Olivares & Foltz, 2004
- Cletocamptus goenchim Gomez, Ingole, Sawant & Singh, 2013
- Cletocamptus gomezi Suárez-Morales, Barrera-Moreno & Ciros-Perez, 2013
- Cletocamptus gravihiatus (Shen & Sung, 1963)
- Cletocamptus koreanus Chang, 2013
- Cletocamptus levis Gómez, 2005
- Cletocamptus mongolicus Stérba, 1968
- Cletocamptus nudus Gómez, 2005
- Cletocamptus pilosus Gómez & Gee, 2009
- Cletocamptus retrogressus Schmankevitsch, 1875
- Cletocamptus samariensis Fuentes-Reinés, Zoppi de Roa & Torres, 2015
- Cletocamptus schmidti Mielke, 2000
- Cletocamptus sinaloensis Gómez, Fleeger, Rocha-Olivares & Foltz, 2004
- Cletocamptus spinulosus Gómez & Gee, 2009
- Cletocamptus stimpsoni Gómez, Fleeger, Rocha-Olivares & Foltz, 2004
- Cletocamptus tainoi Gómez, Gerber & Fuentes-Reinés, 2017
- Cletocamptus tertius Gómez & Gee, 2009
- Cletocamptus thailandensis Boonyanusith & Wongkamhaeng, 2023
- Cletocamptus trichotus Kiefer, 1929
