= Thorvald Boeck =

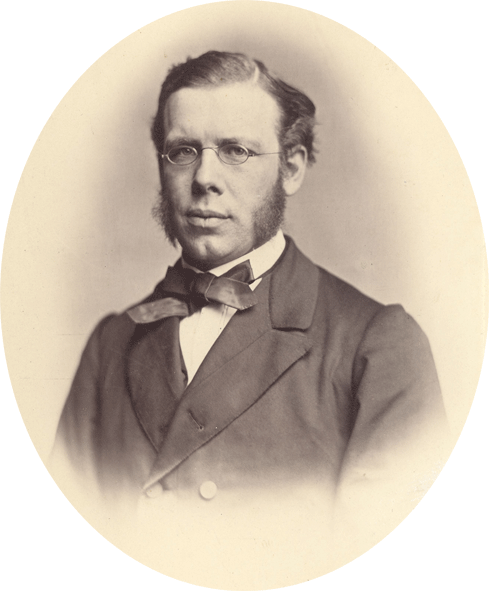
Thorvald Boeck

Thorvald Olaf Boeck (August 15, 1835 – April 21, 1901) was a Norwegian jurist, civil servant, and book collector. He is known for assembling what was the largest private library of its time in Norway.

== Book collection ==
Boeck acquired his first book at the age of nine. He received his examen artium in 1854 from Heltberg High School and his candidate of law degree in 1860 from Royal Frederick University. At that time, he had collected 2,000 books and had worked for a few years as a stipendiary magistrate in Namdalen before returning to his native Kristiania and a new job as a copying clerk at the Ministry of Church and Education in 1863. In 1864 he won the H.R.H. Crown Prince Gold Medal for a thesis on prices of wood and fish. In 1874 Boeck was promoted to royal envoy. He headed the Oslo Workers' Society from 1877 to 1879, and he chaired the "flag meeting" on March 13, 1879, where the participants considered a new tricolor flag as proposed by Hagbard Emanuel Berner.

After marrying in 1866, Boeck relocated to a larger detached residence at Professor Dahls gate (Professor Dahl Street) no. 29, where he had room for his large book collection. However, space was limited, and he sold 754 volumes to the National Library of Iceland.

In 1899, Boeck sold 31,467 books for NOK 25,000 to the Royal Norwegian Society of Sciences and Letters in Trondheim together with a large number of maps, letters, and 610 manuscripts. The sales contract specified that the collection could not be split up. Most of the material was incorporated into the Gunnerus Library and, among other things, was an important addition to its collection of autographs. Today the collection is largely intact and is called the Thorvald Boeck Collection (Thorvald Boecks boksamling) with its own collection of handwritten material. Among other items, it includes:

- A first edition of Saxo Grammaticus's Gesta Danorum from 1514
- A Ludvig Holberg collection consisting of 300 volumes and four letters
- Much work by Henrik Ibsen
- Material by Bjørnstjerne Bjørnson, including a handwritten draft of "Ja, vi elsker dette landet"
- A Henrik Wergeland collection consisting of 100 volumes plus some manuscripts, including a draft of "Til min gyldenlak" (To My Wallflower)

== Family ==
Boeck was the son of the natural scientist and zoologist Christian Peder Bianco Boeck (1798–1877). He was born in the Calmeyerløkken neighborhood of Kristiania (now Oslo) and grew up in Kristiania with his brothers, including the marine biologist Jonas Axel Boeck (1833–1873). In 1866 Boeck married Julie Pauline Louise Maschmann (1841–1923), the daughter of the priest Bernt Sverdrup Maschmann (1805–1869). In 1889, Boeck's daughter Elisabeth (1868–1958) married the architect Herman Backer (1856–1932). Boeck's daughter Antoinette Augusta (1871–1939) married the wholesale merchant Jacob Christian Just Schram (1870–1952). The sculptor and painter Dagfin Werenskiold (1892–1977) married Boeck's granddaughter Elisabeth Mathilde Schram (1897–1989).

== Legacy ==
In the National Gallery there is a painting by Harriet Backer portraying Boeck's private library in 1902.
