= Nitocrella =

Scientific classification
- Kingdom: Animalia
- Phylum: Arthropoda
- Class: Copepoda
- Order: Harpacticoida
- Family: Ameiridae
- Genus: Nitocrella; Chappuis, 1923

Genus of crustaceans

Nitocrella is a genus of copepods. Although most other genera in the family Ameiridae are marine, species of Nitocrella are almost exclusively found in subterranean fresh water or brackish water. More than 80 species are included in the genus, including two which are listed as vulnerable species on the IUCN Red List:

- Nitocrella absentia Karanovic, 2004
- Nitocrella achaiae Pesce, 1981
- Nitocrella aestuarina Coull & Bell, 1979
- Nitocrella afghanica Sterba, 1973
- Nitocrella africana Chappuis, 1955
- Nitocrella akiereki Borutsky, 1978
- Nitocrella asiatica (Sterba, 1967)
- Nitocrella beatricis Cottarelli & Bruno, 1993
- Nitocrella botosaneanui Petkovski, 1973
- Nitocrella calcaripes Damian & Botosaneanu, 1954
- Nitocrella caraioni Petkovski, 1976
- Nitocrella chappuisi Kiefer, 1926
- Nitocrella cubanorum Petkovski, 1976
- Nitocrella delayi Rouch, 1970
- Nitocrella divaricata (Chappuis, 1923)
- Nitocrella dubia Chappuis, 1937
- Nitocrella dussarti Chappuis & Rouch, 1959
- Nitocrella elegans Chappuis & Rouch, 1959
- Nitocrella ensifera Cottarelli, Bruno & Berera, 2007
- Nitocrella fedelitae Pesce, 1985
- Nitocrella gracilis Chappuis, 1955
- Nitocrella halophila Noodt, 1952
- Nitocrella herirudensis Sterba, 1973
- Nitocrella hibernica (Brady, 1880)
- Nitocrella hirta Chappuis, 1923
- Nitocrella hofmilleri Brehm, 1953
- Nitocrella hypogaea Shen & Tai, 1973
- Nitocrella incerta (Chappuis, 1933)
- Nitocrella insularis Miura, 1962
- Nitocrella intermedia Chappuis, 1937
- Nitocrella ioneli Dumont & Decraemer, 1974
- Nitocrella iranica Löffler, 1959
- Nitocrella jankowskajae Borutsky, 1972
- Nitocrella japonica Miura, 1962
- Nitocrella juturna Cottarelli, 1975
- Nitocrella kirgizica Borutsky, 1972
- Nitocrella kosswigi Noodt, 1954
- Nitocrella kunzi Galassi & De Laurentiis, 1997
- Nitocrella kyzylkumica Borutsky, 1972
- Nitocrella ljovuschkini Borutsky, 1967
- Nitocrella longa Karanovic, 2000
- Nitocrella maggii Pesce, 1983
- Nitocrella mara Löffler, 1959
- Nitocrella marina Chappuis & Rouch, 1961
- Nitocrella minoricae Chappuis & Rouch, 1959
- Nitocrella monchenkoi Borutsky, 1972
- Nitocrella montana Noodt, 1965
- Nitocrella morettii Pesce, 1984
- Nitocrella morimotoi Miura, 1962
- Nitocrella motasi Petkovski, 1976
- Nitocrella nana Sterba, 1973
- Nitocrella negreai Petkovski, 1973
- Nitocrella neutra Kiefer, 1933
- Nitocrella obesa Karanovic, 2004
- Nitocrella omega Hertzog, 1936
- Nitocrella orghidani Petkovski, 1973
- Nitocrella paceae Pesce, 1980
- Nitocrella pescei Galassi & De Laurentiis, 1997
- Nitocrella petkovskii Pesce, 1980
- Nitocrella polychaeta Noodt, 1952
- Nitocrella psammophila Chappuis, 1954
- Nitocrella reducta Schäfer, 1936
- Nitocrella rhodiensis Pesce, 1983
- Nitocrella skyrensis Pesce, 1982
- Nitocrella slovenica Petkovski, 1959 (Slovenia)
- Nitocrella somalica Dumont, 1981
- Nitocrella spinulosa Apostolov, 1991
- Nitocrella stammeri Chappuis, 1938
- Nitocrella sterbai Borutsky, 1969
- Nitocrella stetinai Sterba, 1973
- Nitocrella stochi Pesce & Galassi, 1987 (Italy)
- Nitocrella stygia Apostolov, 1976
- Nitocrella subterranea (Chappuis, 1928)
- Nitocrella tianschanica Borutsky, 1972
- Nitocrella tirolensis Kiefer, 1963
- Nitocrella tonsa Mikhailova-Neikova, 1967
- Nitocrella trajani Karanovic, 2004
- Nitocrella tridens Bozic, 1969
- Nitocrella tschaticalica Borutsky, 1978
- Nitocrella unispinosa Shen & Tai, 1973
- Nitocrella vasconica Chappuis, 1937
- Nitocrella yokotai Miura, 1962
