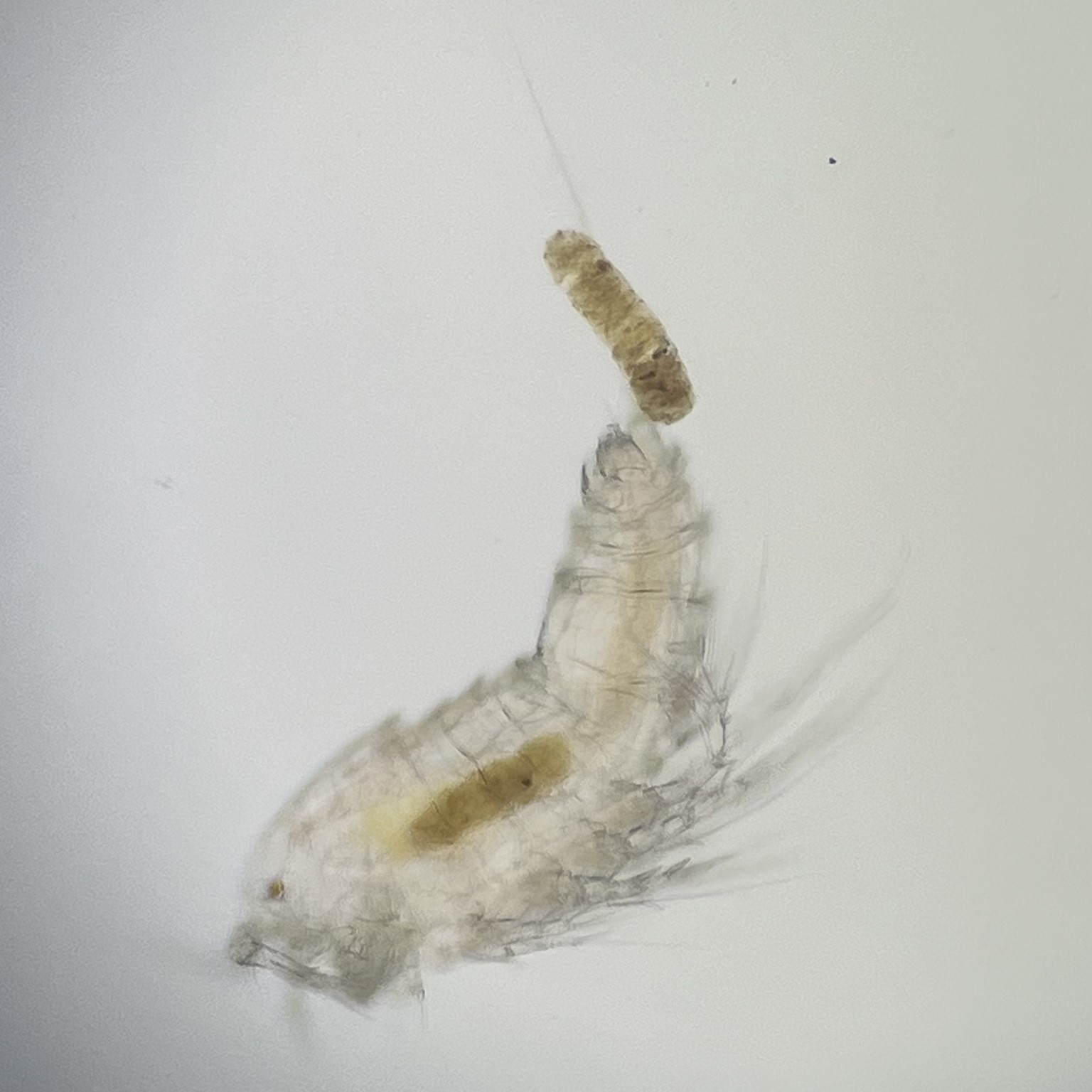
- Bryocamptus pygmaeus

Scientific classification
- Kingdom: Animalia
- Phylum: Arthropoda
- Class: Copepoda
- Order: Harpacticoida
- Family: Canthocamptidae
- Genus: Bryocamptus; Chappuis, 1929

= Bryocamptus =

Genus of crustaceans

Bryocamptus is a genus of copepods belonging to the family Canthocamptidae.

The species of this genus are found in Eurasia and North America.

== Species ==
The following species are recognised in the genus Bryocamptus:

- Bryocamptus arcticus
- Bryocamptus minutus
- Bryocamptus pygmaeus
- Bryocamptus vejdovskyi
