= Salt River (Western Australia) =

Saline river system in Western Australia

Coordinates: 31°54′S 117°30′E

Location
- Country: Australia

Salt River is a river in the Wheatbelt region of Western Australia. It is a tributary of the Avon River, taking water from two of the Avon's sub-catchments, the Yilgarn River and the Lockhart River, from their junction where it passes through a hydrological-topographical pinch-point at Caroline Gap.

From here it flows south-west past Quairading, about 50 kilometres (31 mi) before discharging into the Yenyening Lakes northeast of Brookton. These in turn discharge into the Avon River, which discharges into the Swan River and its estuary, which discharges into the Indian Ocean.

Salt River, and all its tributaries, is a saline river system comprising a chain of salt lakes. Its southern, Lockhart tributaries arise in the vicinity of Lake Grace, Newdegate and Lake King, whilst its Yilgarn tributaries arise north and east of Southern Cross, and near Merredin and Kellerberrin.

Loosely, the term "Salt River" applies to all of these tributaries. The system has a very low gradient, estimated at around 30 centimetres fall per kilometre. In many places it is essentially flat, and in these places it forms relatively large salt-lakes that hold large amounts of water before eventually filling and overflowing. Thus the Salt River does not flow all at once, other than during periods of prolonged or extreme rainfall. Rather, each component rotates through a cycle of filling and overflowing, influenced by cycles further upstream.

== Waterway assessments ==
The river was extensively surveyed in 2008.
