= Fibulacamptus =

Scientific classification
- Kingdom: Animalia
- Phylum: Arthropoda
- Class: Copepoda
- Order: Harpacticoida
- Family: Canthocamptidae
- Genus: Fibulacamptus; Hamond, 1988

Genus of crustaceans

Fibulacamptus is an Australian endemic genus of crustacean in the family Canthocamptidae. Two of the four species are listed as vulnerable species on the IUCN Red List (marked "VU"):

- Fibulacamptus bisetosus Hamond, 1988
- Fibulacamptus gracilior Hamond, 1988
- Fibulacamptus tasmanicus Hamond, 1988
- Fibulacamptus victorianus Hamond, 1988
