= Bernt Sverdrup Maschmann =

Norwegian politician

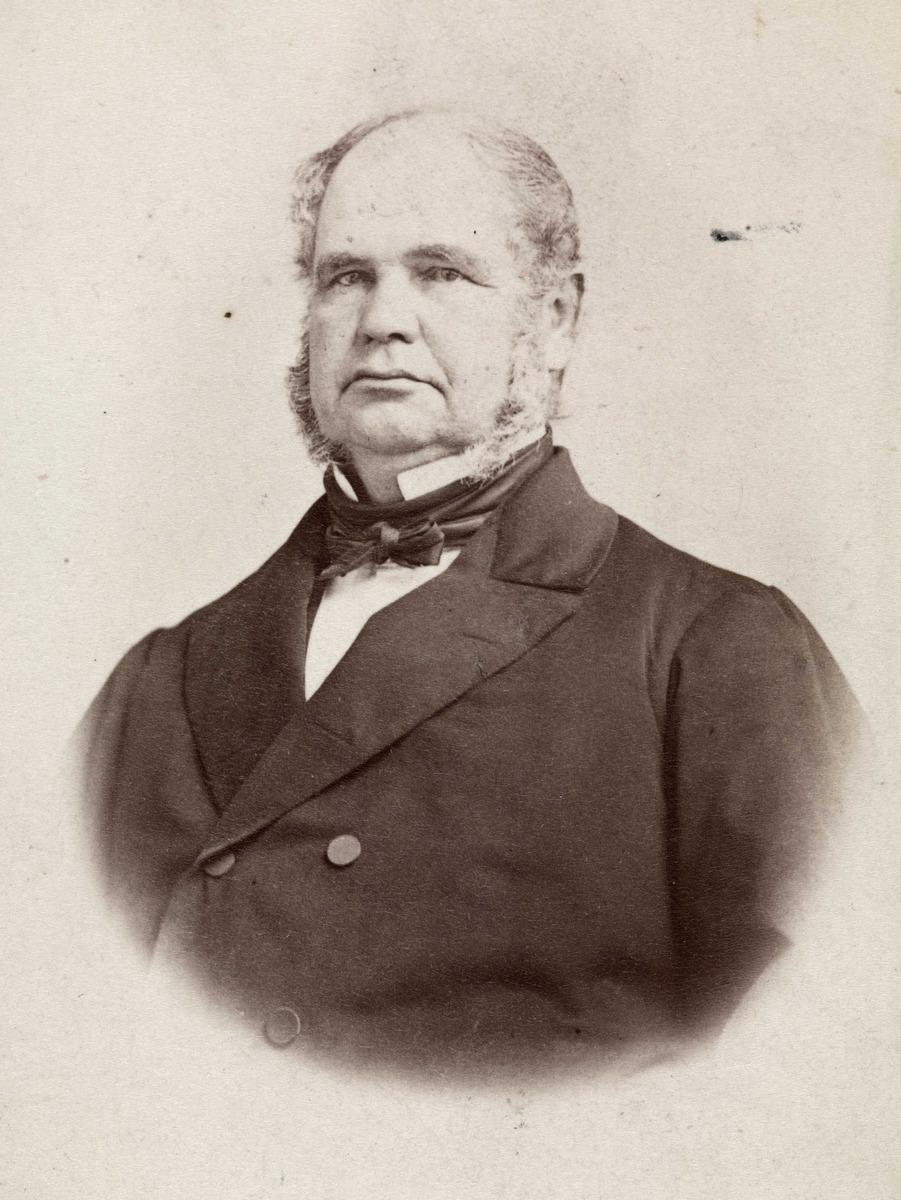
Bernt Sverdrup Maschmann

Bernt Sverdrup Maschmann (17 October 1805 – 13 May 1869) was a Norwegian priest, politician and pharmacist.

Bernt Maschmann was born in Christiania (now Oslo), Norway. He was a son of pharmacist Hans Henrich Maschmann. He earned his Cand.theol. in 1829. He was the pastor of Vega Church in Nordland county from 1830 and then the vicar at Hobøl Church in Smaalenenes county from 1837 to 1869. In addition, from 1849 he was provost for the Øvre Borgesyssel deanery in the Diocese of Borg.

Maschmann was elected to the Norwegian Parliament in 1845, representing the constituency of Smaalenenes Amt which corresponds to the current Østfold county. In 1856, he acquired the family pharmaceutical business, Elefantapoteket i Christiania, which he operated until 1860.

He was married to Antoinette Augusta Aars with whom he had five children. They were the maternal great-parents of jurist and magistrate Harald Gram. He was the father-in-law of the book collector Thorvald Boeck.
