= Kikuchicamptus =

Scientific classification
- Kingdom: Animalia
- Phylum: Arthropoda
- Class: Copepoda
- Order: Harpacticoida
- Family: Canthocamptidae
- Genus: Kikuchicamptus; Novikov & Sharafutdinova, 2022

Genus of crustaceans

Kikuchicamptus is a genus of copepods in the family Canthocamptidae. The type species is Kikuchicamptus mirabilis The genus was first described in 2022 by Alexander Alexeevich Novikov and Dayana Sharafutdinova. The genus name honours Yoshiaki Kikuchi, a copepod specialist.

== Species ==
Species accepted by WoRMS are:

- Kikuchicamptus coreensis (Chang, 2002)
- Kikuchicamptus incurvisetosus (Chang & Ishida, 2001)
- Kikuchicamptus mirabilis (Sterba, 1968)
- Kikuchicamptus morimotoi (Miura, 1969)
- Kikuchicamptus odaeensis (Chang & Ishida, 2001)
- Kikuchicamptus prominulus (Kikuchi in Kikuchi & Ishida, 1994)
- Kikuchicamptus resupinatus (Ishida in Kikuchi & Ishida, 1994)
- Kikuchicamptus semicirculus (Kikuchi in Kikuchi & Ishida, 1994)
- Kikuchicamptus tomikoae (Ishida in Kikuchi & Ishida, 1994)

== Distribution ==
The species of this genus are found in the freshwater streams and lakes of far-east Russia, China, Japan and Korea.
