= Thermomesochra =

Thermomesochra reducta

Conservation status
- Data Deficient (IUCN 2.3)

Scientific classification
- Kingdom: Animalia
- Phylum: Arthropoda
- Class: Copepoda
- Order: Harpacticoida
- Family: Canthocamptidae
- Genus: Thermomesochra; Itô & Burton, 1980
- Species: T. reducta

Binomial name
- Thermomesochra reducta Itô & Burton, 1980

Genus of crustaceans

Thermomesochra reducta is a species of copepod in the family Canthocamptidae, and the only species in the genus Thermomesochra. It is listed as Data Deficient on the IUCN Red List.

T. reducta was described in 1980 from a hot spring at Dusun Tua, Selangor, Malaysia, where it lives at temperatures of 38–58 °C (100–136 °F).
