= Hans Henrich Maschmann =

Norwegian pharmacist

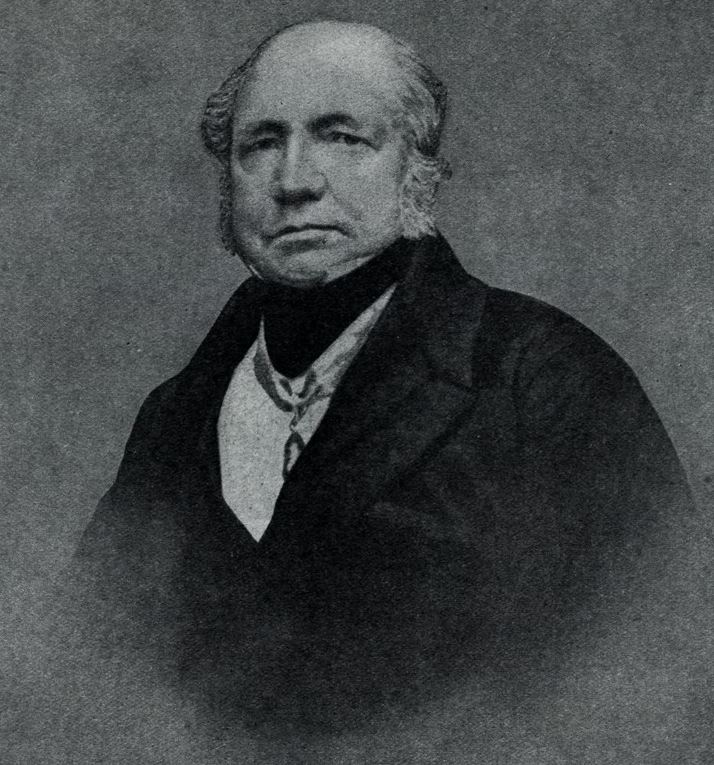

Hans Henrich Maschmann (6 May 1775 – 19 November 1860) was a Norwegian pharmacist who was central to the effort to provide the country with medicines during the Napoleonic Wars.

Hans Henrich Maschmann was born in Oslo, Norway. He was the son of Johan Heinrich Maschmann (1719–1785) who had re-located from Hamburg, Germany. From 1773, his father had been the owner-operator of the pharmaceutical firm, Elefantapoteket i Christiania. In 1786, Hans Maschmann was sent to school in Hamburg which was followed three years later with a four-year apprenticeship at a pharmacy in Halden in Østfold. Later he traveled to Kongsberg, where he attended lectures of the Danish chemist Nicolay Tychsen (1751-1804). In 1796, he took his examen pharmaceuticum. In 1797, following the death of both of his parents, Maschmann received his license to acquire and operate the pharmacy.

When Denmark-Norway was drawn into the Napoleonic wars in 1807, the resulting British naval embargo limited the supply of goods, including pharmaceuticals. Maschmann worked with other pharmaceutical wholesaler in the country to avoided medical shortages during these crisis years which extended until the Treaty of Kiel in 1814. In 1839, he turned over management of the pharmacy firm to his eldest son Carl Gustav Maschmann, who died in 1848. He managed the pharmacy until 1856 when his younger son, Bernt Sverdrup Maschmann joined the firm.

Maschmann was a member of Royal Norwegian Society of Sciences and Letters from 1825. He was appointed Knight of the Order of St. Olav in 1853 and also knighted in the Swedish Order of Vasa.

== Related Reading ==
- Glenthoj, Rasmus; Morten Nordhagen Ottesen (2014) Experiences of War and Nationality in Denmark and Norway, 1807-1815 ( Palgrave Macmillan) ISBN 9780230302815
