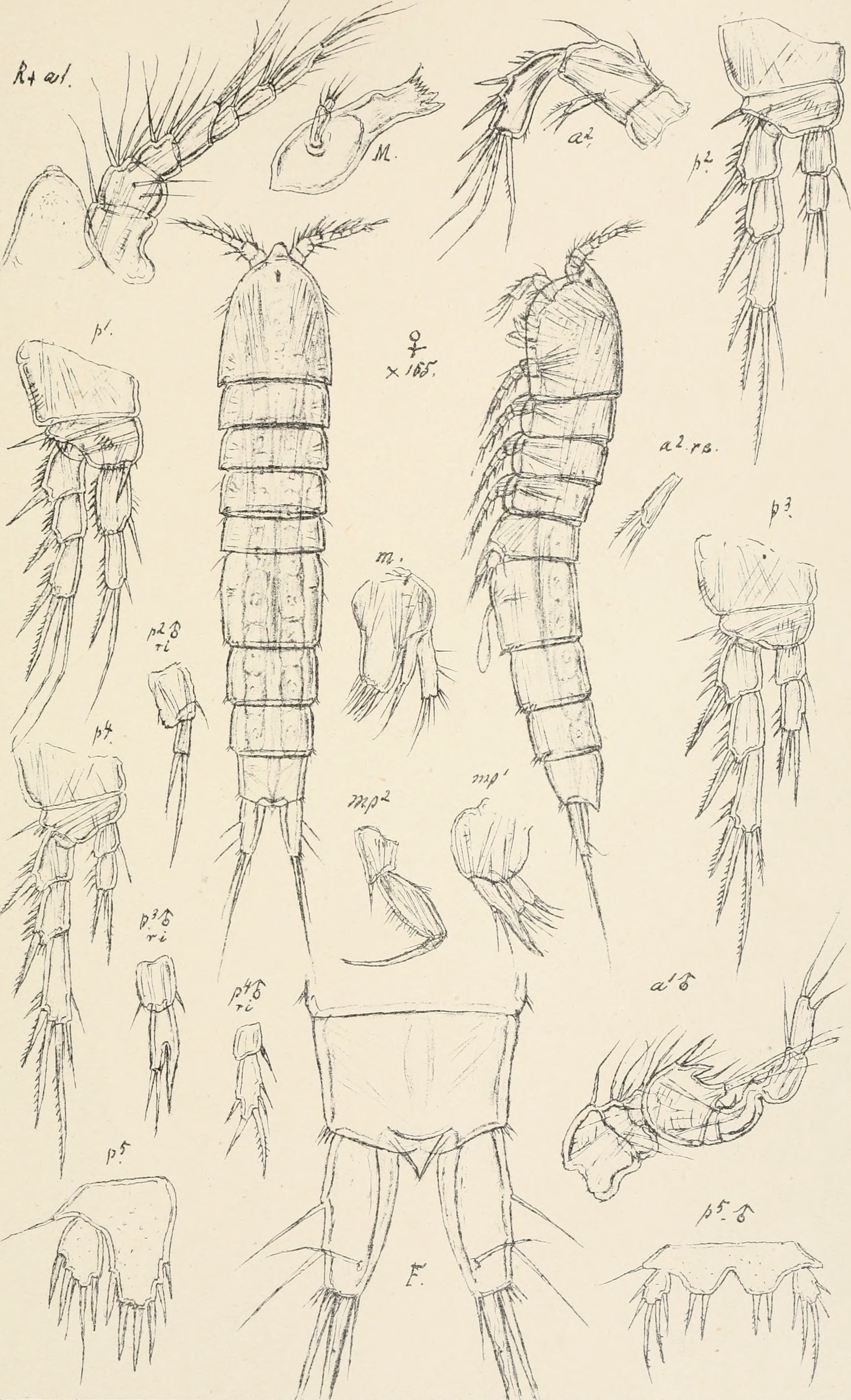

Scientific classification
- Domain: Eukaryota
- Kingdom: Animalia
- Phylum: Arthropoda
- Class: Copepoda
- Order: Harpacticoida
- Family: Canthocamptidae
- Genus: Moraria; Scott & Scott, 1893

= Moraria =

Genus of crustaceans

Moraria is a genus of copepods belonging to the family Canthocamptidae.

The genus has almost cosmopolitan distribution.

Species:

- Moraria acuta Borutzky, 1952
- Moraria affinis Chappuis, 1927
