= Cyclopinodes =

Scientific classification
- Domain: Eukaryota
- Kingdom: Animalia
- Phylum: Arthropoda
- Class: Copepoda
- Order: Cyclopoida
- Family: Hemicyclopinidae
- Genus: Cyclopinodes; Wilson, 1932

Species
- Cyclopinodes belgicae Lindberg, 1953; Cyclopinodes elegans (Scott, 1894); Cyclopinodes elongata (Wilson C.B., 1932) (type); Cyclopinodes intermedia Lindberg, 1953; Cyclopinodes pusilla (Sars, 1905)

Genus of crustaceans

Cyclopinodes is a genus of marine copepods in the family Hemicyclopinidae.
