= Paramorariopsis =

Scientific classification
- Domain: Eukaryota
- Kingdom: Animalia
- Phylum: Arthropoda
- Class: Copepoda
- Order: Harpacticoida
- Family: Canthocamptidae
- Subfamily: Canthocamptinae
- Genus: Paramorariopsis; Brancelj, 1992

Genus of crustaceans

Paramorariopsis is a genus of copepods in the family Canthocamptidae. It is endemic to Slovenia.
