= Pilocamptus =

Scientific classification
- Kingdom: Animalia
- Phylum: Arthropoda
- Clade: Pancrustacea
- Class: Copepoda
- Order: Harpacticoida
- Family: Canthocamptidae
- Genus: Pilocamptus; Huys, 2009

Genus of crustaceans

Pilocamptus is a genus of copepods belonging to the family Canthocamptidae.

== Species ==
Species:

- Pilocamptus africanus (Chappuis, 1933)
- Pilocamptus alluaudi (Chappuis, 1933)
- Pilocamptus georgevitchi (Chappuis, 1924)
