= Pseudomoraria =

Pseudomoraria triglavensis

Conservation status
- Vulnerable (IUCN 2.3)

Scientific classification
- Kingdom: Animalia
- Phylum: Arthropoda
- Class: Copepoda
- Order: Harpacticoida
- Family: Canthocamptidae
- Genus: Pseudomoraria; Brancelj, 1994
- Species: P. triglavensis

Binomial name
- Pseudomoraria triglavensis Brancelj, 1994

Genus of crustaceans

Pseudomoraria is a genus of copepods in the family Canthocamptidae. It is monotypic being represented by the single species Pseudomoraria triglavensis. It has only been found in a small alpine lake Močilec at an altitude of 1,690 metres (5,540 ft) in the Julian Alps of Triglav National Park, Slovenia. It is listed as a vulnerable species on the IUCN Red List.

== See also ==
- Triglav
