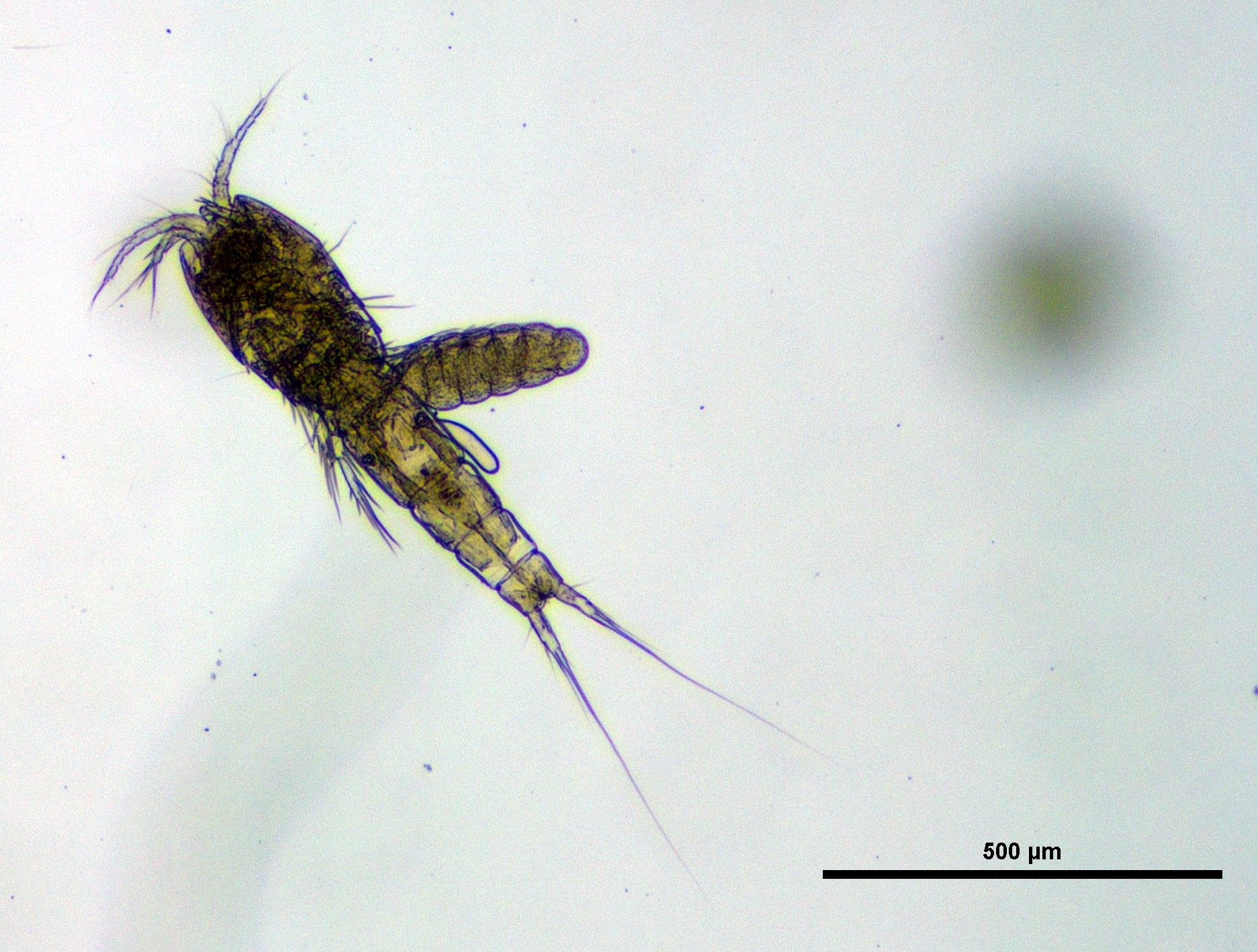
- A picture of Elaphoidella gracilis

Scientific classification
- Kingdom: Animalia
- Phylum: Arthropoda
- Class: Copepoda
- Order: Harpacticoida
- Family: Canthocamptidae
- Subfamily: Canthocamptinae
- Genus: Elaphoidella; Chappuis, 1928

Synonyms
- Stygoelaphoidella Apostolov, 1985

= Elaphoidella =

Genus of crustaceans

Elaphoidella is a genus of freshwater copepods in the family Canthocamptidae. It contains over 200 species, including three classified as vulnerable species by the IUCN – three endemic to Slovenia (Elaphoidella franci, Elaphoidella jeanneli and Elaphoidella slovenica) and one endemic to the United States (Elaphoidella amabilis). In total, the genus Elaphoidella contains the following species:

- Elaphoidella aberrans Chappuis, 1954
- Elaphoidella affinis Chappuis, 1933
- Elaphoidella africana (Cottarelli & Bruno, 1994)
- Elaphoidella aioii Chappuis, 1955
- Elaphoidella algeriensis Rouch, 1987
- Elaphoidella amabilis Ishida in Reid & Ishida, 1993
- Elaphoidella anatolica Chappuis, 1953
- Elaphoidella angelovi Mikhailova-Neikova, 1969
- Elaphoidella angirmii Löffler, 1968
- Elaphoidella apicata Chappuis, 1950
- Elaphoidella apostolovi Wells, 2007
- Elaphoidella aprutina Pesce, Galassi & Apostolov, 1987
- Elaphoidella arambourgi Chappuis, 1936
- Elaphoidella armata (Delachaux, 1918)
- Elaphoidella balcanica Apostolov, 1992
- Elaphoidella balkanica Apostolov, 1992
- Elaphoidella bidens (Schmeil, 1894)
- Elaphoidella birsteini Borutsky, 1948
- Elaphoidella bisetosa Apostolov, 1985
- Elaphoidella bispina Dussart, 1984
- Elaphoidella borutzkyi Mikhailova-Neikova, 1972
- Elaphoidella botosaneanui Petkovski, 1973
- Elaphoidella boui Rouch, 1988
- Elaphoidella bouilloni Rouch, 1964
- Elaphoidella brehieri Apostolov, 2002
- Elaphoidella brevicaudata Apostolov, 2002
- Elaphoidella brevifurcata Chappuis, 1954
- Elaphoidella brevipes Chappuis, 1935
- Elaphoidella bromeliaecola (Chappuis, 1928)
- Elaphoidella bryophila Chappuis, 1928
- Elaphoidella bulbifera Chappuis, 1937
- Elaphoidella bulbiseta (Apostolov, 1998)
- Elaphoidella bulgarica (Apostolov, 1991)
- Elaphoidella cabezasi Petkovski, 1982
- Elaphoidella caeca Miura, 1964
- Elaphoidella californica M. S. Wilson, 1975
- Elaphoidella calypsonis Chappuis & Rouch, 1959
- Elaphoidella capiteradiata Brehm, 1951
- Elaphoidella carterae Reid in Reid & Ishida, 1993
- Elaphoidella cavatica Chappuis, 1957
- Elaphoidella cavernicola Apostolov, 1992
- Elaphoidella cavicola Shen & Tai, 1965
- Elaphoidella chappuisi Rouch, 1970
- Elaphoidella charon Chappuis, 1936
- Elaphoidella claudboui Apostolov, 2003
- Elaphoidella cliffordi Chappuis, 1932
- Elaphoidella coiffaiti Chappuis & Kiefer, 1952
- Elaphoidella colombiana Gaviria, 1993
- Elaphoidella cornuta Chappuis, 1931
- Elaphoidella coronata (G. O. Sars, 1904)
- Elaphoidella cottarellii Pesce & De Laurentiis, 1996
- Elaphoidella crassa Chappuis, 1954
- Elaphoidella crassicaudis Chappuis, 1936
- Elaphoidella crenobia Petkovski, 1973
- Elaphoidella croatica Petkovski, 1959
- Elaphoidella cuspidata Chappuis, 1941
- Elaphoidella cvetkae Petkovski, 1983
- Elaphoidella cvetkovi Mikhailova-Neikova, 1967
- Elaphoidella czerkessica Borutsky, 1972
- Elaphoidella damasi Chappuis, 1938
- Elaphoidella damianae Wells, 2007
- Elaphoidella decorata (Daday, 1901)
- Elaphoidella denticulata Chappuis, 1929
- Elaphoidella derjugini (Rylov, 1932)
- Elaphoidella dispersa Chappuis, 1934
- Elaphoidella einslei Petkovski, 1981
- Elaphoidella elaphoides (Chappuis, 1923)
- Elaphoidella elegans Chappuis, 1931
- Elaphoidella elegantula (Chappuis, 1931)
- Elaphoidella elgonensis Chappuis, 1936
- Elaphoidella elongata Chappuis, 1950
- Elaphoidella eucharis Chappuis, 1953
- Elaphoidella federicae Pesce & Galassi, 1988
- Elaphoidella femurata Basamakov, 1987
- Elaphoidella fluviusherbae Bruno & Reid in Bruno et al., 2000
- Elaphoidella fonticola Chappuis, 1937
- Elaphoidella franci Petkovski, 1983
- Elaphoidella ganeshi Reid, 1998
- Elaphoidella garbetensis Rouch, 1980
- Elaphoidella gordani Karanovic, 1998
- Elaphoidella gracilis (G. O. Sars, 1863)
- Elaphoidella grandidieri (Guerne & Richard, 1893)
- Elaphoidella hallensis Kiefer, 1963
- Elaphoidella helenae Chappuis, 1953
- Elaphoidella hellmichi Löffler, 1968
- Elaphoidella hirsuta Chappuis, 1945
- Elaphoidella humboldti Löffler, 1963
- Elaphoidella humphreysi Karanovic, 2006
- Elaphoidella hyalina Chappuis, 1932
- Elaphoidella incerta Chappuis, 1937
- Elaphoidella infernalis Rouch, 1970
- Elaphoidella insularis Chappuis, 1956
- Elaphoidella intermedia Chappuis, 1931
- Elaphoidella iskrecensis Apostolov, 1997
- Elaphoidella italica Pesce, Galassi & Apostolov, 1987
- Elaphoidella jakobii M. H. Nogueira, 1959
- Elaphoidella janas Cottarelli & Bruno, 1993
- Elaphoidella jasonis Chappuis, 1953
- Elaphoidella javaensis (Chappuis, 1928)
- Elaphoidella jeanneli (Chappuis, 1928)
- Elaphoidella jochenmartensi Dumont & Maas, 1988
- Elaphoidella jojoi Petkovski, 1982
- Elaphoidella juxtaputealis Damian & Botosaneanu, 1954
- Elaphoidella karamani Chappuis, 1936
- Elaphoidella karllangi Petkovski, 1973
- Elaphoidella kenyensis Chappuis, 1936
- Elaphoidella kodiakensis M. S. Wilson, 1975
- Elaphoidella labani Löffler, 1973
- Elaphoidella laciniata (Douwe, 1911)
- Elaphoidella laevis Chappuis, 1950
- Elaphoidella leruthi Chappuis, 1937
- Elaphoidella limnobia Chappuis, 1938
- Elaphoidella lindbergi Chappuis, 1941
- Elaphoidella longifurcata Chappuis & Kiefer, 1952
- Elaphoidella longipedis Chappuis, 1931
- Elaphoidella longiseta Chappuis, 1932
- Elaphoidella mabelae Galassi & Pesce, 1991
- Elaphoidella madiracensis Apostolov, 1998
- Elaphoidella malayica (Chappuis, 1928)
- Elaphoidella margaritae Pesce & Apostolov, 1985
- Elaphoidella marjoryae Bruno & Reid in Bruno et al., 2000
- Elaphoidella massai Chappuis, 1936
- Elaphoidella mauro Chappuis, 1956
- Elaphoidella michailovae Basamakov, 1970
- Elaphoidella millennii Brancelj, 2009
- Elaphoidella minos Chappuis, 1956
- Elaphoidella miurai Chappuis, 1955
- Elaphoidella montenegrina Karanovic, 1997
- Elaphoidella moreae Pesce, 1982
- Elaphoidella necessaria Kiefer, 1933
- Elaphoidella negroensis Kiefer, 1967
- Elaphoidella neoarmata Petkovski, 1973
- Elaphoidella neotropica Petkovski, 1973
- Elaphoidella nepalensis Ishida, 1994
- Elaphoidella nuragica Pesce & Galassi, 1986
- Elaphoidella nyongi Roen, 1956
- Elaphoidella pandurskyi Apostolov, 1992
- Elaphoidella pani Por, 1983
- Elaphoidella paraelaphoides Pesce, Galassi & Apostolov, 1987
- Elaphoidella parajakobii Reid & José, 1987
- Elaphoidella paraplesia Kiefer, 1967
- Elaphoidella parapostolovi Wells, 2007
- Elaphoidella parelaphoides Pesce, Galassi & Apostolov, 1987
- Elaphoidella parvifurcata Petkovski, 1983
- Elaphoidella pectinata (Delachaux, 1924)
- Elaphoidella pescei Apostolov, 1986
- Elaphoidella petrovae Apostolov, 1986
- Elaphoidella phreatica (Chappuis, 1925)
- Elaphoidella pintoae Reid & José, 1987
- Elaphoidella plesai Pesce & Galassi, 1994
- Elaphoidella plutonis Chappuis, 1938
- Elaphoidella prohumboldti Petkovski, 1983
- Elaphoidella propedamasi Defaye & Heymer, 1996
- Elaphoidella proserpina Chappuis, 1934
- Elaphoidella pseudocornuta Dumont & Maas, 1988
- Elaphoidella pseudojeanelli Pónyi, 1956
- Elaphoidella pseudophreatica Sterba, 1956
- Elaphoidella putealis (Chappuis, 1925)
- Elaphoidella pyrenaica Rouch, 1970
- Elaphoidella quadrispinosa Chappuis, 1938
- Elaphoidella quemadoi Petkovski, 1982
- Elaphoidella radkei Reid, 1987
- Elaphoidella reducta Rouch, 1964
- Elaphoidella reedi M. S. Wilson, 1975
- Elaphoidella rodriguensis Borutsky, 1969
- Elaphoidella romanica Kulhavy, 1969
- Elaphoidella rossellae Pesce, Galassi & Apostolov, 1987
- Elaphoidella sabanillae Petkovski, 1982
- Elaphoidella salvadorica Ebert, 1976
- Elaphoidella schubarti Chappuis, 1936
- Elaphoidella serbica Petkovski & Brancelj, 1988
- Elaphoidella sewelli (Chappuis, 1928)
- Elaphoidella shawangunkensis Strayer, 1989
- Elaphoidella silverii Pesce, 1985
- Elaphoidella silvestris M. H. Lewis, 1972
- Elaphoidella similis Chappuis, 1931
- Elaphoidella simplex Chappuis, 1944
- Elaphoidella siolii Kiefer, 1967
- Elaphoidella slovenica Wells, 2007
- Elaphoidella spinosa Chappuis, 1952
- Elaphoidella stammeri Chappuis, 1936
- Elaphoidella striblingi Reid, 1990
- Elaphoidella stygia (Apostolov, 1989)
- Elaphoidella suarezi Reid, 1987
- Elaphoidella subcrenobia Petkovski, 1983
- Elaphoidella subgracilis (Willey, 1934)
- Elaphoidella subplutonis Pesce, Galassi & Apostolov, 1987
- Elaphoidella subterranea (Apostolov, 1991)
- Elaphoidella superpedalis Shen & Tai, 1964
- Elaphoidella surinamensis (Delachaux, 1924)
- Elaphoidella synjakobii Petkovski, 1983
- Elaphoidella tarmani Brancelj, 2009
- Elaphoidella taroi Chappuis, 1955
- Elaphoidella tenera Chappuis, 1937
- Elaphoidella thienemanni Chappuis, 1931
- Elaphoidella trisetosa Chappuis, 1933
- Elaphoidella turgisetosa Petkovski, 1983
- Elaphoidella uenoi Chappuis, 1958
- Elaphoidella unica Kiefer, 1931
- Elaphoidella unidens (Menzel, 1916)
- Elaphoidella uva Karanovic, 2001
- Elaphoidella vaga Chappuis, 1950
- Elaphoidella valkanovi Basamakov, 1973
- Elaphoidella vandeli Chappuis & Rouch, 1958
- Elaphoidella varians Chappuis, 1955
- Elaphoidella vasiconica Rouch, 1970
- Elaphoidella vietnamica Borutsky, 1967
- Elaphoidella wilsonae Hunt, 1979
- Elaphoidella winkleri (Chappuis, 1928)
