= Lockhart River (Western Australia) =

River in Western Australia

Coordinates: 32°00′S 117°54′E

The Lockhart River is a river in the Wheatbelt region of Western Australia. It is a sub-catchment of the Avon River, and has an area of 32,400 square kilometres (12,500 sq mi). At its junction with the Yilgarn River to form the Salt River, it passes through a hydrological-topographical pinch-point at Caroline Gap (a geomorphic saddle between Mt Caroline and Mt Stirling).

== Catchment rivers ==
The Lockhart River catchment area is drained by the rivers:

- Lockhart River originating from Lake Biddy.
- Camm River draining from Lake King through Hyden to Kondinin where it meets the Lockhart River.
- Pingrup River which arises near Lake Cairlocup and flows north to Lake Grace and the Lockhart River.

== Stream flow ==
Stream flow measured in the Yilgarn and Lockhart Rivers since 1976 shows there to be annual flow through these systems, although flow volume is highly variable. Annual flow in the Lockhart River was in excess of 10 gigalitres (350,000,000 cu ft) in seven out of the 25 years of record, while in 10 years it was less than 1 gigalitre (35,000,000 cu ft). Studies in 2008-09 gave the average annual total flow for the Lockhart River as 13 GL (compared to 4 GL for the Yilgarn River). Streamflow salinity in the Lockhart River is very high, similar to sea-water, and the highest in Western Australia.

== Waterway assessments ==
The river was extensively surveyed in 2008/2009.
