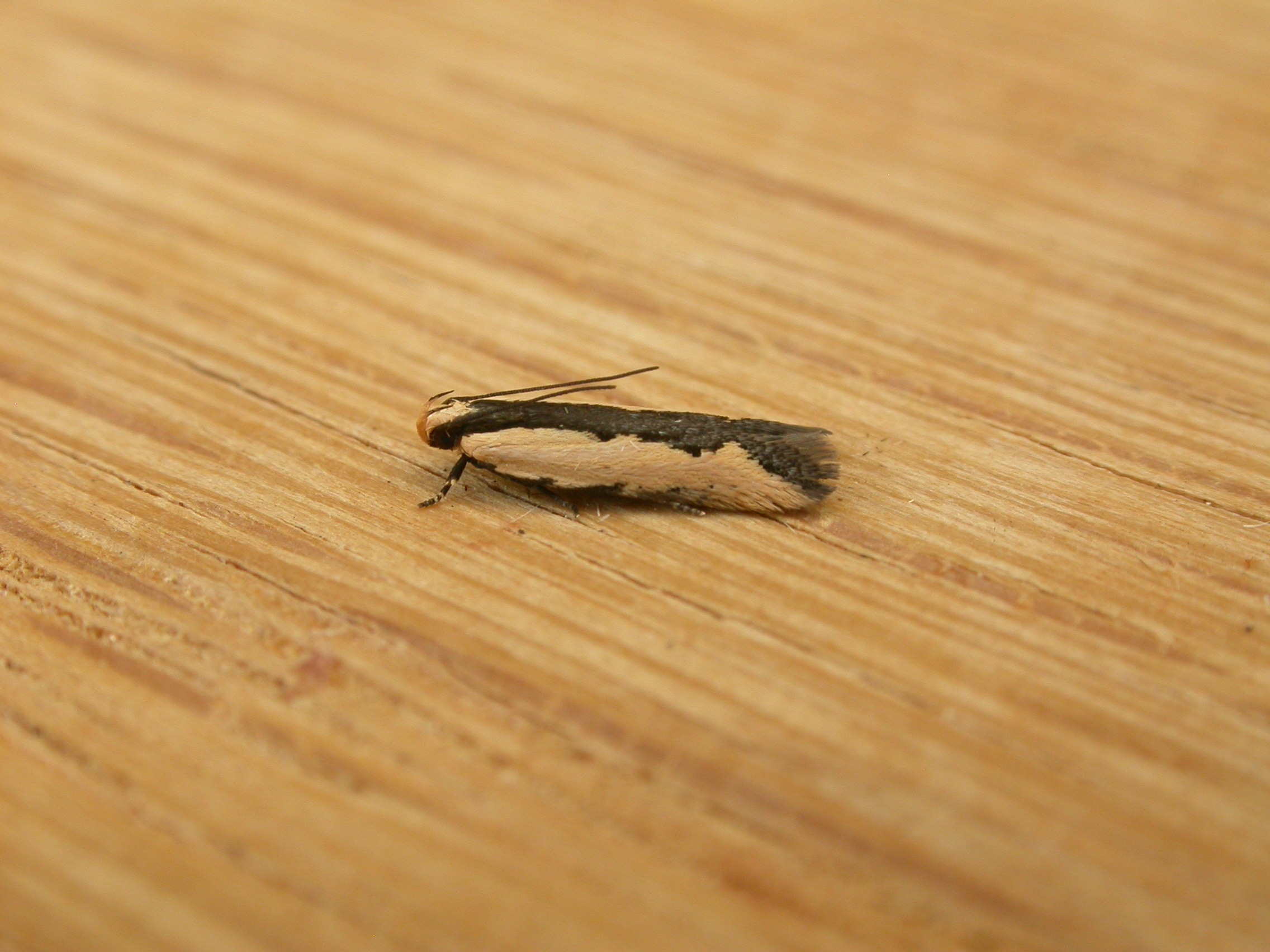
- A picture of Ardozyga mesochra

Scientific classification
- Domain: Eukaryota
- Kingdom: Animalia
- Phylum: Arthropoda
- Class: Copepoda
- Order: Harpacticoida
- Family: Canthocamptidae
- Genus: Mesochra; Boeck, 1864

= Mesochra =

Genus of crustaceans

Mesochra is a genus of copepods belonging to the family Canthocamptidae.

The genus has cosmopolitan distribution.

Species:

- Mesochra aestuarii Gurney, 1921
- Mesochra alaskana Wilson, 1958
