= Ceuthonectes =

Scientific classification
- Kingdom: Animalia
- Phylum: Arthropoda
- Class: Copepoda
- Order: Harpacticoida
- Family: Canthocamptidae
- Genus: Ceuthonectes; Chappuis, 1923

Synonyms
- Morariodes Borutsky, 1930

Genus of crustaceans

Ceuthonectes is a genus of copepods in the family Canthocamptidae. It includes the Slovenian endemic species C. rouchi, which is listed as a vulnerable species on the IUCN Red List. Ceuthonectes contains the following species:

- Ceuthonectes boui Apostolov, 2002
- Ceuthonectes bulbiseta Apostolov, 2002
- Ceuthonectes chappuisi Rouch, 1980
- Ceuthonectes colchidanus (Borutsky, 1930)
- Ceuthonectes gallicus Chappuis, 1928
- Ceuthonectes haemusi Apostolov, 2000
- Ceuthonectes hungaricus Pónyi, 1958
- Ceuthonectes latifurcatus (Borutsky, 1931)
- Ceuthonectes mirabilis Miura, 1964
- Ceuthonectes pescei Cottarelli & Saporito, 1985
- Ceuthonectes petkovskii Karanovic, 1999
- Ceuthonectes rouchi Petkovski, 1984
- Ceuthonectes serbicus Chappuis, 1924
- Ceuthonectes vievilleae Rouch, 1980
