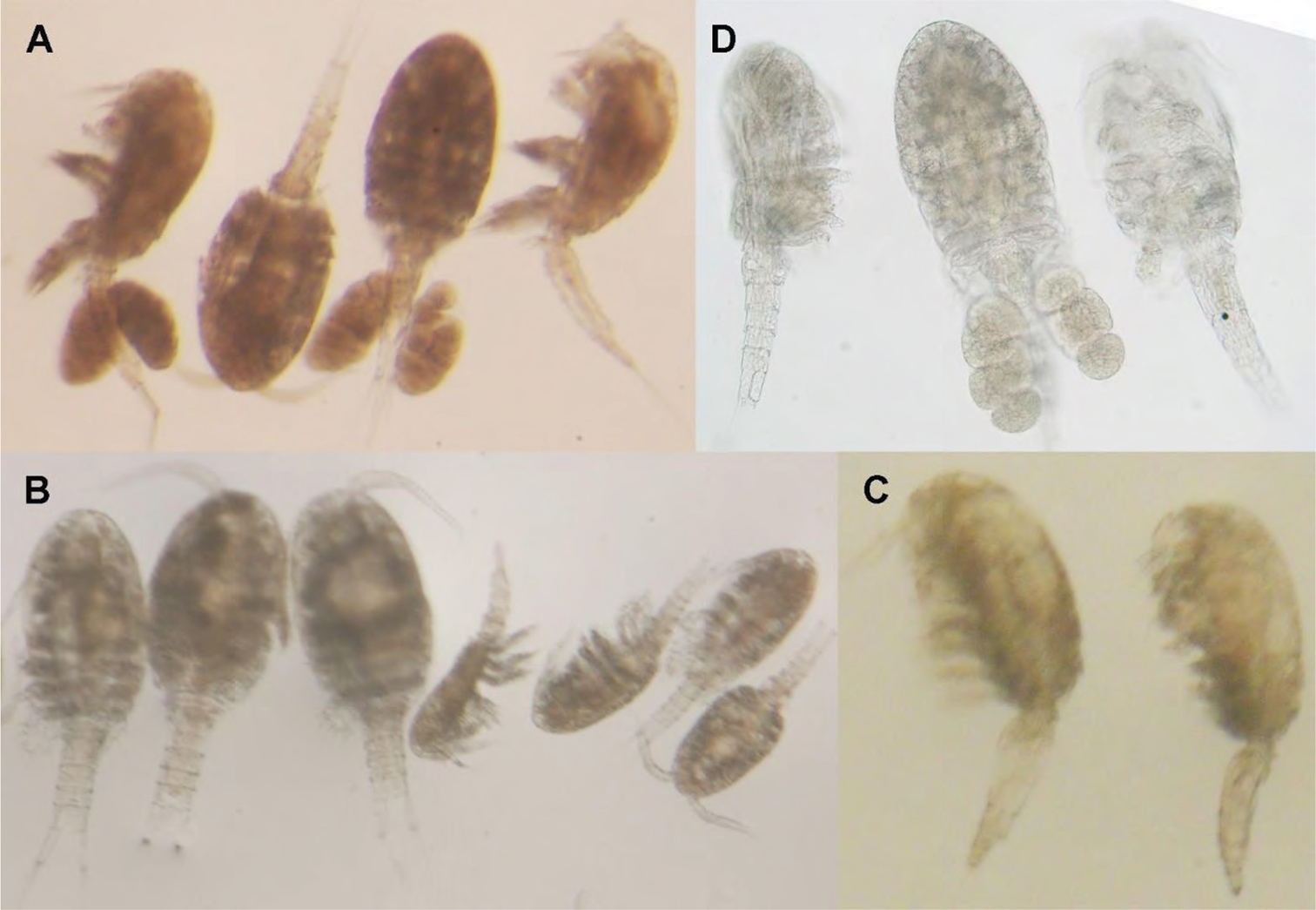
- Four Cyclopina species

Scientific classification
- Kingdom: Animalia
- Phylum: Arthropoda
- Class: Copepoda
- Order: Cyclopoida
- Family: Cyclopinidae
- Genus: Cyclopina; Sars G.O., 1863

Synonyms
- Cuipora Lotufo & Rocha C.E.F., 1991; Cyclopuella Por, 1979; Erythropolites Huys & Boxshall, 1990; Heptnerina Ivanenko & Defaye, 2004; Herbstina Huys & Boxshall, 1990; Microcyclopina Plesa, 1961; Troglocyclopina Jaume & Boxshall, 1996

= Cyclopina =

Genus of crustaceans

Cyclopina is a genus of copepods belonging to the order Cyclopoida, and the family, Cyclopinidae. The genus was first described in 1863 by zoologist, Carl Friedrich Wilhelm Claus.

== Species ==
Species accepted by WoRMS:

- Cyclopina adelphae Karanovic, 2008
- Cyclopina adriatica Petkovski, 1955
- Cyclopina agilis Wilson C.B., 1932
- Cyclopina americana Herbst, 1982
- Cyclopina amita Karanovic, 2008
- Cyclopina arenicola (Plesa, 1961)
- Cyclopina arenosa Lotufo, 1994
- Cyclopina balearica (Jaume & Boxshall, 1996)
- Cyclopina brachystylis Sars G.O., 1921
- Cyclopina brevifurca Sars G.O., 1913
- Cyclopina busanensis Karanovic, 2020
- Cyclopina caiala Lotufo & Rocha C.E.F., 1991
- Cyclopina caissara Lotufo, 1994
- Cyclopina caroli Lotufo, 1994
- Cyclopina clausii Czerniavski, 1868
- Cyclopina confusa (Ivanenko & Defaye, 2004)
- Cyclopina crassisetosa Herbst, 1953
- Cyclopina curtijeju Karanovic, 2020
- Cyclopina dorae Lotufo, 1994
- Cyclopina ensifera Grandori, 1925
- Cyclopina esilis Brian, 1938
- Cyclopina exigua Herbst, 1974
- Cyclopina gracilis Claus, 1863
- Cyclopina hadzii Petkovski, 1955
- Cyclopina heterospina Shen & Bai, 1956
- Cyclopina janaina (Lotufo & Rocha C.E.F., 1991)
- Cyclopina kasignete Karanovic, 2008
- Cyclopina kasis Karanovic, 2008
- Cyclopina kieferi Schäfer, 1936
- Cyclopina kiraensis Hiromi, 1984
- Cyclopina koreana Karanovic, 2020
- Cyclopina latipes Schäfer, 1936
- Cyclopina laurentica Nicholls, 1939
- Cyclopina mediterranea Steuer, 1940
- Cyclopina norvegica Boeck, 1865
- Cyclopina oblivia Monchenko, 1981
- Cyclopina ovalis Brady, 1880
- Cyclopina pacifica Smirnov, 1935
- Cyclopina parapsammophila Monchenko, 1981
- Cyclopina phoenicia Lindberg, 1953
- Cyclopina pontica Monchenko, 1977
- Cyclopina psammophila Steuer, 1940
- Cyclopina pygmaea Sars G.O., 1918
- Cyclopina rotundipes Herbst, 1952
- Cyclopina schneideri Scott T., 1903
- Cyclopina semireducta Herbst, 1964
- Cyclopina sinaitica (Por, 1979)
- Cyclopina smirnovi Herbst, 1982
- Cyclopina soror Karanovic, 2008
- Cyclopina steueri Früchtl, 1923
- Cyclopina tuberculata Herbst, 1962
- Cyclopina unisetosa Karanovic, 2008
- Cyclopina vachoni Nicholls, 1939
- Cyclopina wido Karanovic, 2020
- Cyclopina yutimaete Lotufo, 1994
