= Gwangchigi Beach =

Beach in Seogwipo, South Korea

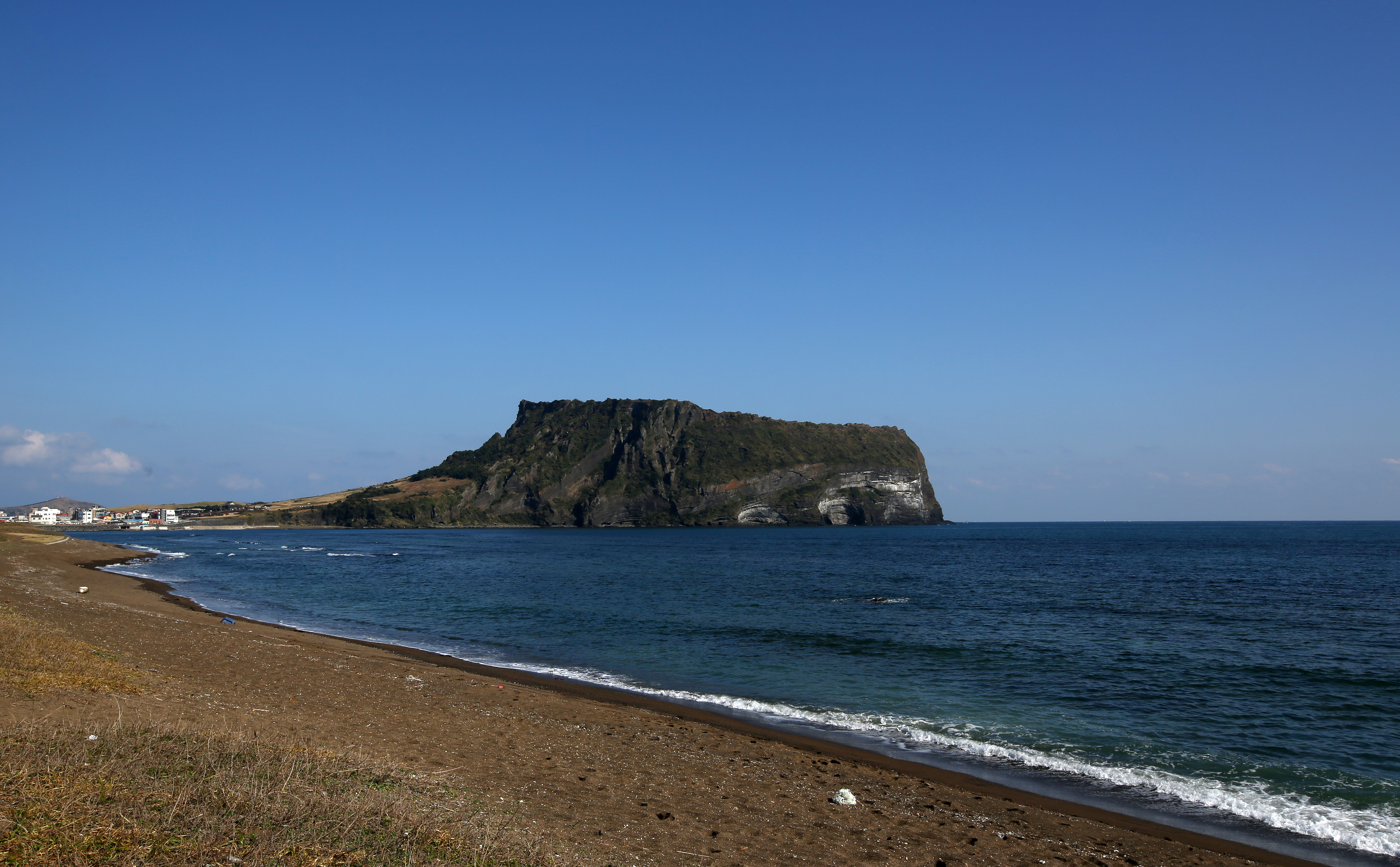
- The beach, viewing north towards Seongsan Ilchulbong (2014)
- Interactive map of Gwangchigi Beach
- Coordinates: 33.4537°N 126.9255°E
- Location: Goseong-ri, Seongsan, Seogwipo, Jeju Province, South Korea

Korean name
- Hangul: 광치기해변
- RR: Gwangchigi haebyeon
- MR: Kwangch'igi haebyŏn

Gwangchigi Beach (Korean: 광치기해변) is a beach in Goseong-ri, Seongsan, Seogwipo, Jeju Province, South Korea. The beach is famous for its scenic view of the nearby mountain Seongsan Ilchulbong, its volcanic rock formations, and its black sands.

The beach, as one of the most easternmost points on Jeju, is famous for its view of the sunrise.

It is a major landmark on the Jeju Olle Trail.

== See also ==
- List of beaches in Jeju Province
