= Christian Peder Bianco Boeck =

Norwegian medical doctor and zoologist (1798–1877)

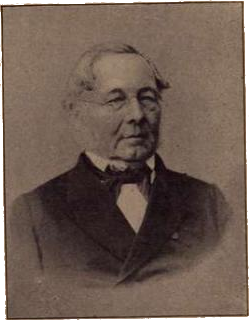
Christian Boeck

Christian Peder Bianco Boeck (September 5, 1798 – July 11, 1877) was a Norwegian medical doctor, zoologist, botanist and mountaineer. He is most associated with his catalog of approved drugs, Pharmacopoea Norvegica (1854) and with his studies of trilobites.

== Biography ==
Boeck grew up at Kongsberg in Buskerud where his father worked for the Kongsberg Silver Mines. From 1817 he studied natural science and medicine at the Royal Frederick University (now University of Oslo). After his medical studies he traveled in Europe accompanied by Niels Henrik Abel and Baltazar Mathias Keilhau. In 1820, he made a botanically motivated expedition to Jotunheimen, with a launch point from the farm of Skrebergo in Slidre (in what is now Øystre Slidre Municipality), where he had studied years before. This trip, which he undertook together with Keilhau, resulted in the first ascent of Kalvehøgde (12 July 1820), Falketind (14 July 1820) and Nordre Skagastølstind (July 1820) and the exploration of some lakes. Later, the expedition became known as the Jotunheimen discovery (Jotunheimens oppdagelse).

He worked as a lecturer in Veterinary science at the faculty of medicine in the University of Oslo (1828–1840). He later became a professor in physiology. In 1836, Boeck and Keilhau went together along the Norwegian coast from Oslo to Trondheim to study a possible upheaval of the land. On these occasions Boeck obtained first hand knowledge of the various fields of geology. On several journeys abroad, sometimes accompanied by Keilhau, Boeck visited many scientific institutions and got in touch with leading geologists and biologists, including paleontologist Alexandre Brongniart.

Boeck also collaborated with Michael Sars. With his broad knowledge of natural science and of foreign scientific research, Boeck was a central figure in natural science. He joined in founding Den physiographiske Forening (later the Academy of Science in Oslo) and Lægeforeningen i Kristiania (later the Medical Society), and he was also for many years the editor of the periodical Magazin for Naturvidenskaberne. Boeck began paleontological studies in his student days. In the region of Oslo, he collected fossils, especially trilobites. Travel abroad gave him the opportunity of studying trilobites from Europe. In his first paper on trilobites (1827), Boeck presents a study of the group and deals with a number of foreign species which he personally had examined in Central European museum collections. In 1849, he was elected a member of the Royal Swedish Academy of Sciences.

== Personal life ==
In 1828, he married Elisabeth Collett (1806–1883), daughter Jonas Collett (1772–1851) and Maren Christine Collett (1777–1860). They were the parents of Jonas Axel Boeck (1833–1873) and Thorvald Olaf Boeck (1835–1901). The family lived in the neighborhood of Marienlyst in the borough of St. Hanshaugen in Kristiania (now Oslo).

== Selected works ==
- Notitser til læren - 1827
- Forslag til Indretningen af et Veterinærinstitut for Norge - 1830
- Skand. Naturforsk. Andet møte- 1840
- Gaea Norvegica- 1841
- Pharmacopoea Norvegica - 1854
- Om Tubularia regalis, en ny Art fra Belsund paa Spitsbergen - 1859
- Forholdet af Trækningsbølgen i Muskler - 1864

== Related reading ==
- Ryvarden, Leif (2007) Jotunheimen. Naturen, opplevelsene, historien (N.W. Damm & Søn AS) ISBN 978-82-04-10519-6
- Størmer, Leif (1939) Early descriptions of Norwegian trilobites the type specimens of C. Boek, M. Sars and M. E. Smark
