= Jonas Axel Boeck =

Norwegian marine biologist (1833–1873)

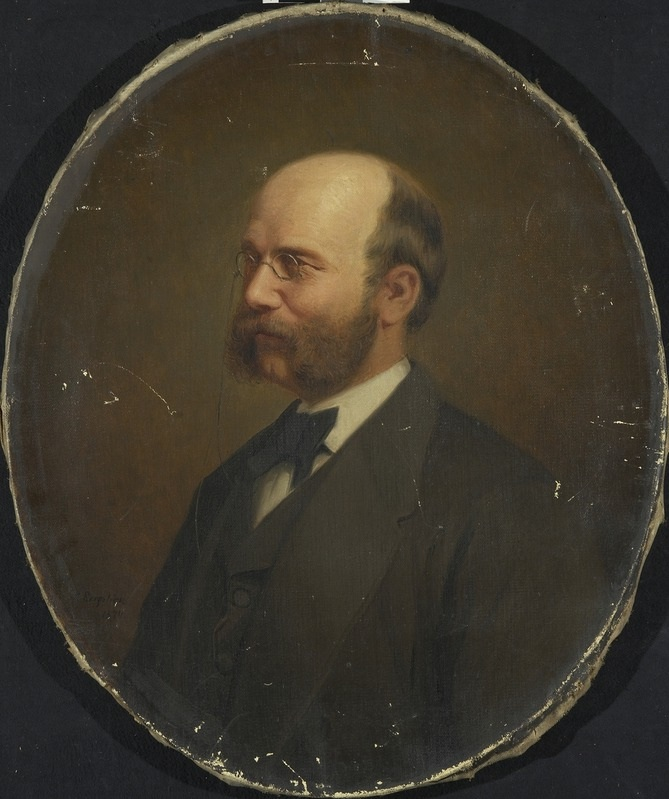
Jonas Axel Boeck Painting by Knud Bergslien

Jonas Axel Boeck (16 May 1833 – 6 May 1873) was a Norwegian marine biologist.

== Personal life ==
Axel Boeck was born in 1833 in Aker (now part of Oslo) to Christian Peter Bianco Boeck (1798–1877) and Elisabeth Collett (1806–1883). He was the brother of the jurist Thorvald Boeck. He died just prior to his 40th birthday in Christiania (now Oslo).

== Work and legacy ==
He studied medicine, completing his degree in 1863. Although he was somewhat overshadowed by his successors Georg Ossian Sars and Johan Hjort, Boeck was a pioneer of fisheries science. He was the first Norwegian fisheries scientist, and the country's first herring researcher. His major works were Crustacea Amphipoda Borealia et Arctica (1870), about northern amphipods, and Om Silden og Sildefiskerierne, navnlig om det norske Vaarsildfisket (1871), on the Atlantic herring and its fishery. In the latter, Boeck attempted to investigate periodicity in herring by examining archival data, and combining scientific and historical approaches.

The copepod genus Boeckella is named in honour of Axel Boeck, as were the species Metopa boeckii, Diastylis boecki, Asterocheres boecki, Pardaliscella boeckii, Amphilochoides boeckii, Sarsameira boecki, Metridia boecki, Parandania boecki, Follicculina boecki and Siphonactinia boeckii.

== Award ==
- Crown Prince's Gold Medal (Kronprinsens gullmedalje) in 1860 for a dissertation on the species Gammarus locusta.
