= Yilgarn River (Western Australia) =

River in Western Australia

Coordinates: 30°48′S 119°00′E

Yilgarn River is a river in the eastern Wheatbelt region of Western Australia. It is a sub-catchment of the Avon River, and has an area of 55,900 square kilometres (21,600 sq mi). At its junction with Lockhart River, their combined flow passes through a hydrological-topographical pinch-point at Caroline Gap, a geomorphic saddle between Mt Caroline and Mt Stirling.

It originates in the region east from Southern Cross and west from Coolgardie. From Lake Seabrook and Lake Deborah it flows generally west, skirting north of Bullfinch, then to the south-west past Merredin and south of Kellerberrin to its confluence with the Lockhart River at Caroline Gap.

== Catchment rivers ==
The Yilgarn River catchment area is drained by the rivers:

- Yilgarn River originating from southeast from Lake Seabrook and Boorabbin
- Belka River draining from southwest from Merredin
- Mulka River draining from north of Lake Brown

== Stream flow ==
Studies in 2008-09 gave the average annual total flow for the Yilgarn River as 4 GL (compared to 13 GL for the Lockhart River). Streamflow salinity in the Yilgarn River is about two-thirds that of sea-water.

== Waterway assessments ==
The river was extensively surveyed in 2008/2009.
