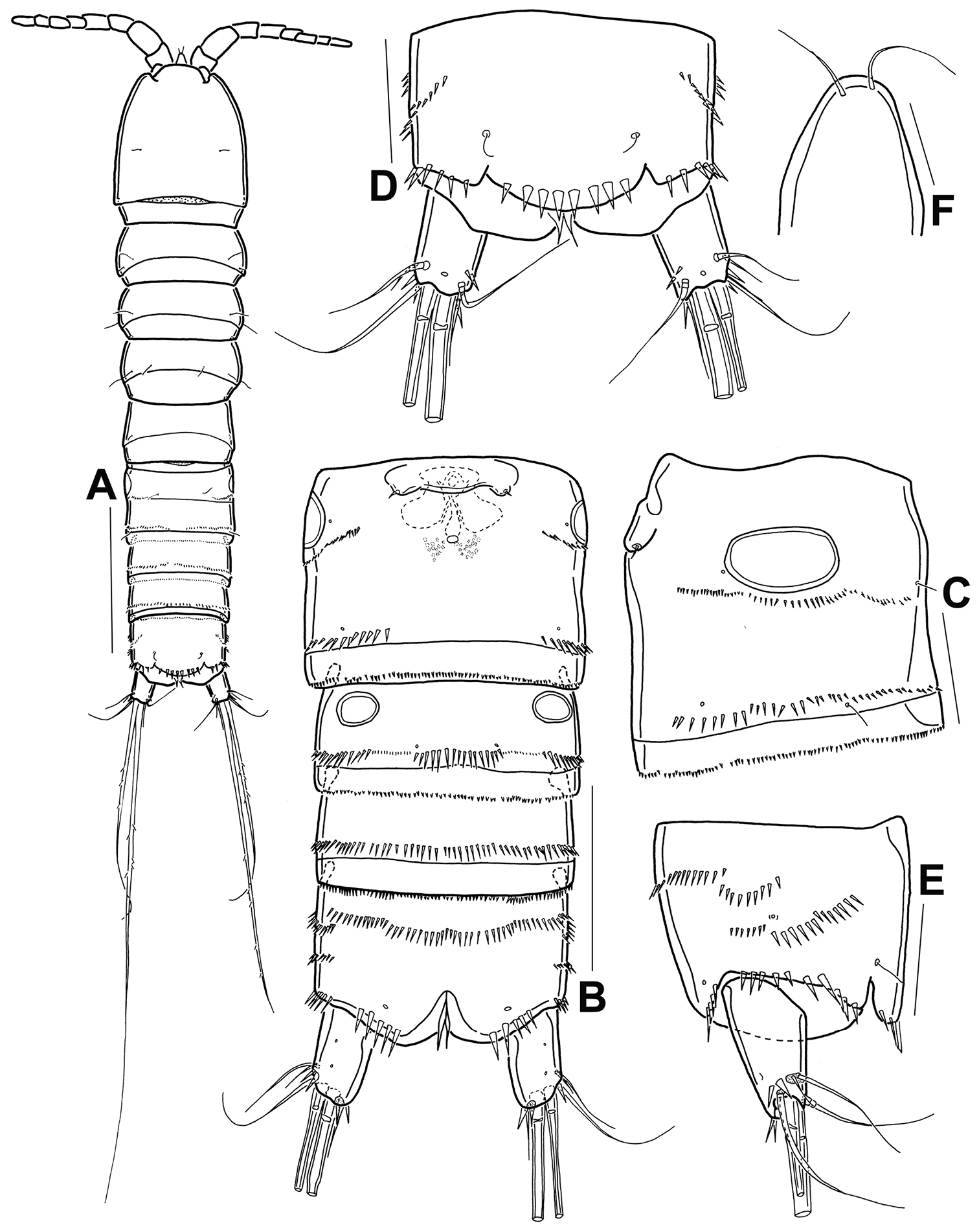
- Nitocrella karanovici

Scientific classification
- Kingdom: Animalia
- Phylum: Arthropoda
- Clade: Pancrustacea
- Class: Copepoda
- Order: Harpacticoida
- Family: Ameiridae; Monard, 1927

Synonyms
- Cancrincolidae

= Ameiridae =

Family of crustaceans

Ameiridae is a family of crustaceans belonging to the order Harpacticoida, first described in 1927 by Albert Monard. The type genus is Ameira Boeck, 1865.

== Genera ==
Genera:

- Abnitocrella Karanovic, 2006
- Abscondicola Fiers, 1990
- Ameira Boeck, 1865
- Ameiropsis Sars, 1907
- Ameiropsyllus Huys, 2009
- Antillesia Humes, 1958
- Antistygonitocrella Karanovic, Eberhard, Perina & Callan, 2013
- Archinitocrella Karanovic, 2006
- Biameiropsis Karanovic, 2006
