= Cyclopinidae =

Scientific classification
- Kingdom: Animalia
- Phylum: Arthropoda
- Class: Copepoda
- Order: Cyclopoida
- Suborder: Oithonida
- Family: Cyclopinidae; Sars G.O., 1913

Family of crustaceans

Cyclopinidae is a family of copepods belonging to the order Cyclopoida. The family was first described in 1913 by Norwegian zoologist, Georg Ossian Sars.

These copepods are found in both marine and brackish waters.

== Genera ==
Genera accepted by WoRMS:

- Afrocyclopina Wells, 1967
- Allocyclopina Kiefer, 1954
- Arenocyclopina Krishnaswamy, 1957
- Cryptocyclopina Monchenko, 1979
- Cyclopidina Steuer, 1940
- Cyclopina Claus, 1863
- Cyclopinopsis Smirnov, 1935
- Cyclopinotus Monchenko, 1989
- Heterocyclopina Plesa, 1968
- Indocyclopina Wells, 1967
- Koreacyclopina Karanovic, 2021
- Mexiclopina Suárez-Morales & Almeyda-Artigas, 2015
