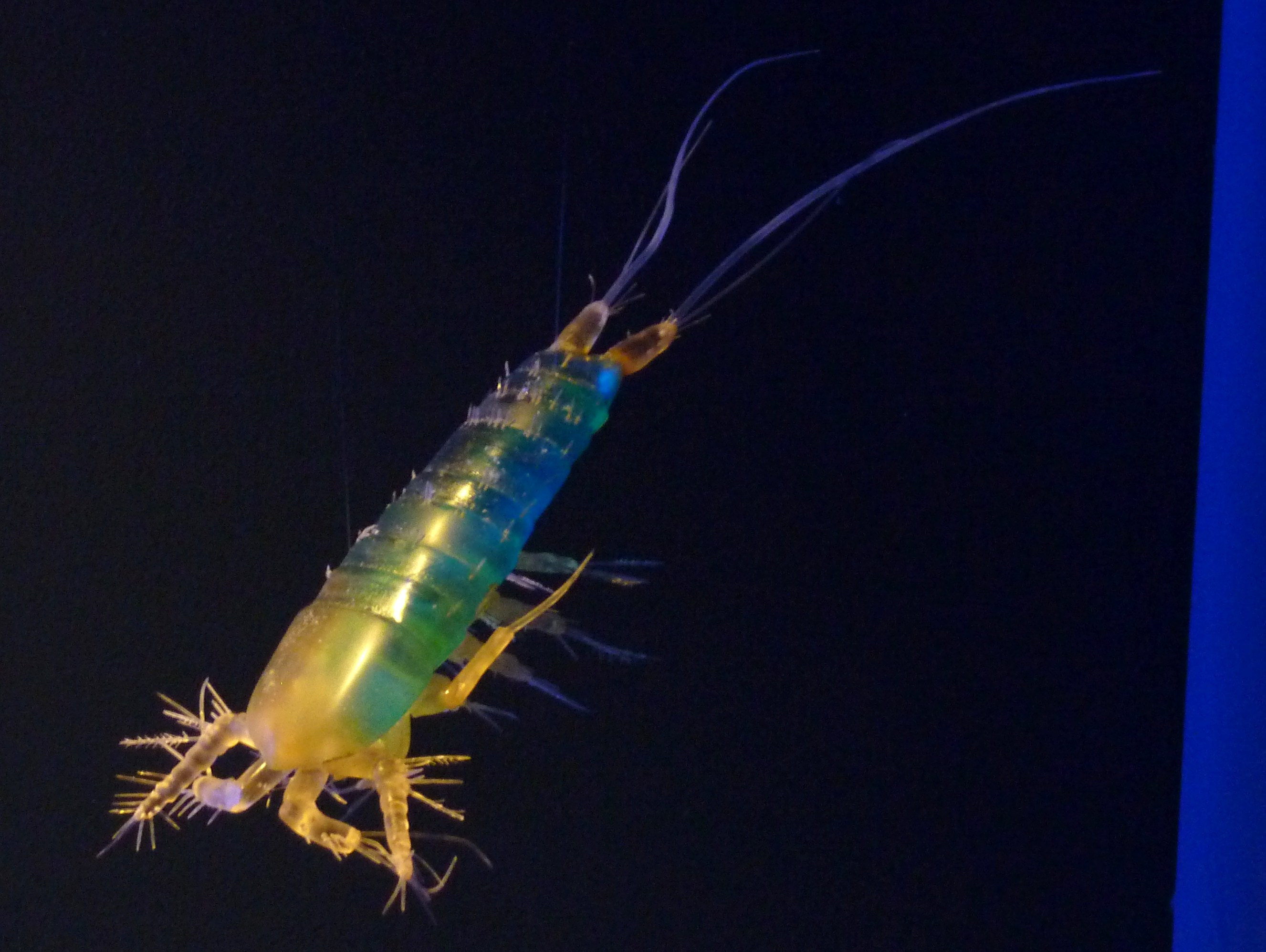
- Stygepactophanes jurassicus (700 ×)

Scientific classification
- Kingdom: Animalia
- Phylum: Arthropoda
- Clade: Pancrustacea
- Class: Copepoda
- Order: Harpacticoida
- Family: Canthocamptidae; G. O. Sars, 1906

Genera
- See text

= Canthocamptidae =

Canthocamptidae Temporal range: Pennsylvanian–Recent

Family of crustaceans

Canthocamptidae is a family of copepods. Most of the 700 species are confined to fresh water, although there are also marine species. It contains the following genera:

- Afrocamptus Chappuis, 1932
- Antarctobiotus Chappuis, 1930
- Antrocamptus Chappuis, 1956
- Arcticocamptus Chappuis, 1928
- Attheyella Brady, 1880
- Australocamptus Karanovic, 2004
- Boreolimella Huys & Thistle, 1989
- Bryocamptus Chappuis, 1928
- Canthocamptus Westwood, 1836
- Ceuthonectes Chappuis, 1923
- Cletocamptus Schmankevitsch 1875
- Delachauxiella Brehn & Lunz, 1926
- Echinocamptus Chappuis, 1929
- Elaphoidella Chappuis, 1928
- Elaphoidellopsis Apostolov, 1985
- Epactophanoides Borutzky, 1966
- Ferroniera Labbe, 1924
- Fibulacamptus Hamond, 1988
- Glaciella Kikuchi, 1994
- Gulcamptus Miura, 1969
- Hemimesochra G. O. Sars, 1920
- Heteropsyllus T. Scott, 1894
- Hypocamptus Chappuis, 1929
- Isthmiocaris George & Schminke, 2003
- Itunella Brady, 1896
- Kikuchicamptus Novikov & Sharafutdinova, 2022
- Leimia Willey, 1923
- Lessinocamptus Stoch, 1997
- Ligulocamptus Guo, 1998
- Limocamptus Chappuis, 1928
- Loefflerella Rouch, 1962
- Maraenobiotus Mrázek, 1893
- Mesochra Boeck, 1865
- Mesopsyllus Por, 1960
- Moraria T. & A. Scott, 1893
- Morariopsis Borutzky, 1931
- Nannomesochra Gurney, 1932
- Neoelaphoidella Apostolov, 1975
- Neomrazekiella Ozdikmen & Pesce, 2006
- Orthopsyllus Brady & Robertson, 1873
- Paramorariopsis Brancelj, 1992
- Parepactophanes Kunz, 1935
- Pesceus Özdikmen, 2008
- Pholetiscus Humes, 1947
- Phyllocamptus T. Scott, 1899
- Pilocamptus Wells, 2007
- Pindamoraria Reid & Rocha, 2003
- Pordfus Özdikmen, 2008
- Poria Lang, 1965
- Portierella Labbe, 1926
- Praelaphoidella Apostolov, 1991
- Psammocamptus Mielke, 1975
- Pseudocamptus Ebert, 1976
- Pseudomoraria Brancelj, 1994
- Rheocamptus Borutzky, 1964
- Spelaeocamptus Chappuis, 1933
- Stenocaris G. O. Sars, 1909
- Stygepactophanes Moeschler & Rouch, 1984
- Thermomesochra Ito & Burton, 1980
- Vibriopsyllus Kornev & Chertoprud 2008

Indeterminate fossils likely members of the family are known from the late Carboniferous of Oman, which were found in a clast of bitumen from a diamictite that had likely seeped up through a subglacial lake.
