= Tomislav Karanovic =

Serbian carcinologist (born 1969)

Tomislav Karanovic (born 1969) is a Serbian zoologist, who specialises in copepods. He earned his Ph. D. in 2000 from University of Novi Sad, where he was employed as a professor from August to November, 2014. From January 2009 to April 2019 he worked at Institute for Marine and Antarctic Studies at the University of Tasmania. In 2006 he was employed by the Western Australian Museum. He is currently working at Hanyang University, Seoul.

He has described many new copepod species and genera, from Australia, Central Europe, and Korea.

== Species named ==
Species for which he wrote the original description include Cyclopina amita, Cyclopina wido.

== See also ==
- List of taxa described by Karanovic with enwiki pages
