= Hemiboeckella powellensis =

Conservation status
- Vulnerable (IUCN 2.3)

Scientific classification
- Kingdom: Animalia
- Phylum: Arthropoda
- Clade: Pancrustacea
- Class: Copepoda
- Order: Calanoida
- Family: Centropagidae
- Genus: Hemiboeckella
- Species: H. powellensis

Binomial name
- Hemiboeckella powellensis Bayly, 1979
- Holotype site: Lake Powell, WA

Species of crustacean

Hemiboeckella powellensis is a zooplankton copepod of which only four of its kind have ever been observed. "Hemiboeckella" refers to this genus being similar to Boeckella, whilst "powellensis" refers to Lake Powell in Western Australia, the region it is endemic to.

It was first described in 1979 by Ian Albert Edgar Bayly.

Its existence was initially recorded in May and June 1977, and it has not been observed since.

== Description ==
Hemiboeckella powellensis is a small crustacean that ranges from 0.67 to 1.16mm. Like all crustaceans, it has a segmented exoskeleton. It also has a copepod's characteristically round shaped body. The head consists of two setae on the anterior face, along with segmented maxillipeds. Protruding from its anterior, there are two antennae that are longer than its abdomen, with another smaller antennule. It has nautical eye, a characteristic trait of copepods. However, it does not appear to be used as a visual aid. It has four legs that are segmented three times, along with a curved claw on its right side near its head, and a much shorter exopodite limb on its left. Said claw contains small spines on the inside, a trait shared with species such as Karukinka fueguina and Hemiboeckella searli. The rear end (urosome) is slimmer than its body, a trait consistent with most copepods.

Since there have been no observed females, the sex differences are unknown. However, it is a defining trait of species within the Hemiboeckella genus to have significant differences between the genders.

== Habitat and distribution ==
Hemiboeckella powellensis has only ever been observed in Lake Powell, which is a 4 km^{2} (1.5 sq mi) estuary near Albany, and is a part of the Torbay Lake system, which in turn is part of the Warren bioregion. In particular, this species was observed in vegetation near the lake's shore. Being part of a lake system, the species habitat is subjected to water flows from nearby creeks, as well as freshwater runoff from other local estuaries. The water level is generally quite shallow, due to a high sediment buildup. Said sediments are a mixture of sand, silt and nutrient dense soils, caused by runoff from nearby estuary drains. The water is somewhat acidic, unsalty and of moderate temperatures. Whilst the lake is considered stagnant freshwater, due to the presence of marine copepod Gladioferens imparipes, and the lake's proximity to the ocean, it can be inferred that there is some tidal influence over the region.

Prior to human intervention, Lake Powell would dry up in the summer. However, due to nearby residents concerned with flooding, creeks and other estuaries flowing into Lake Powell would be blocked, and water would be let in manually. Due to this, the Lake no longer dries up during the summer. The effect that this has had on H. powellensis is unknown.

=== Origins ===
In general, Western Australia, particularly southern Western Australia, is home to a lot of endemic copepods similar to H. powellensis. It is theorised that this occurred when water levels started to recede during the Cretaceous period, leaving behind estuaries filled with unique copepod species.

== Behaviour and adaptations ==
Not much has been directly observed on the behaviour of H. powellensis. However, its physical attributes indicate some of its behavioural tendencies.

=== Feeding ===
As a freshwater zooplankton that is a part of the calanoida order, H. powellensis most likely feeds on the abundant phytoplankton present in Lake Powell. The maxillipeds move around in the water to produce a current, leading to prey flowing towards H. powellensis. Its remaining limbs grasp its prey to be placed into its body for digestion. Some of its potential prey include Nodularia spumigena, Anabaena circinalis and Microcystis aeruginosa, since they are very abundant in Lake Powell. The right-side claw can also be used to obtain resources.

=== Reproduction ===
Genital segments have also been observed on the species, indicating the ability to sexually reproduce. Other attributes such as the mechanism of reproduction, fertilisation and the species lifecycle have yet to be observed.

=== Adaptations ===
The antennules on its face are typically used to find members of its species, or to locate and avoid predators. H. powellensis most likely utilises four of its legs for swimming, a trait consistent with other calanoida order copepods.

== Conservation status ==
Due to H. powellensis being endemic to such a precise region, the IUCN Red List of Endangered Species lists it as "vulnerable". The niche distribution of the species means that if Lake Powell is threatened, then the species could be in serious danger of extinction.

Erosion, salinisation and urbanisation due to European settlement may all pose a risk to their habitat. An increase in human activity has led to acid-sulphate soils to run into the lake, which led to the water increasing in acidity, and therefore damaging the organism populations in the lake. As well as this, the three creeks supplying water into Lake Powell have their water flows artificially controlled by human interference, which has permanently altered the composition of the lake. As a result, cyanobacteria and typhus blooms have both been documented in the area. The poor water quality of the lake is of concern, but stakeholders have been making efforts to improve H. powellensis's habitat.

In 1977, attempts to collect more specimens on H. powellesis were made by collecting samples from Lake Powell and nearby estuaries, but none were found.

== Similar species ==
Hemiboeckella powellensis is one of three different species found in the Hemiboeckella genus. The other two, Hemiboeckella searli and Hemiboeckella andersonae, are also endemic to Australia. The three species are all very similar, but can be differentiated by claw size, limb length and number of exoskeleton segments. Unlike H. powellensis, both H. searli and H. andersonae are distributed throughout the eastern and western coasts of Australia.

Hemiboeckella was named after the genus Boeckella due to both species being very similar. Due to this, there has been debate as to whether these two genera should be considered unique to one another, or if Hemiboeckella is a subgenus of Boeckella.

Hemiboeckella powellensis also retains a lot of similarities to most species of calanoida copepods, particularly between species located in Australia and New Zealand. This could be due to both continents being a part of the supercontinent Gondwana. Once this continent separated due to continental drift, the copepod species became more geographically isolated.
