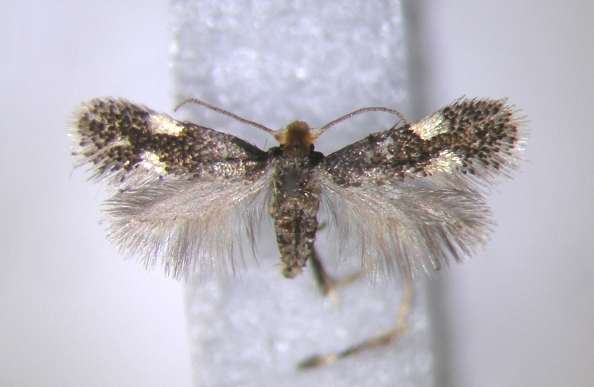

Scientific classification
- Kingdom: Animalia
- Phylum: Arthropoda
- Clade: Pancrustacea
- Class: Insecta
- Order: Lepidoptera
- Family: Nepticulidae
- Genus: Trifurcula
- Species: T. headleyella

Binomial name
- Trifurcula headleyella (Stainton, 1854)

Synonyms
- Nepticula headleyella Stainton, 1854; Nepticula argyrostigma Frey, 1856; Nepticula dubiella Hauder, 1912; Trifurcula rodella Svensson, 1982; Fedalmia headleyella (Stainton, 1854)

= Trifurcula headleyella =

Species of moth

Trifurcula headleyella is a moth of the family Nepticulidae. It is found in all Europe, with the possible exception of Ireland and the Mediterranean islands

The wingspan is 4.2–5.8 mm.

The larvae feed on Prunella grandiflora, Prunella laciniata and Prunella vulgaris. They mine the leaves of their host plant. Pupation takes place outside of the mine.
