= Limnocalanus macrurus =

Scientific classification
- Domain: Eukaryota
- Kingdom: Animalia
- Phylum: Arthropoda
- Class: Copepoda
- Order: Calanoida
- Family: Centropagidae
- Genus: Limnocalanus
- Species: L. macrurus

Binomial name
- Limnocalanus macrurus Sars, 1863

Species of crustacean

Limnocalanus macrurus is a species of crustacean belonging to the family Centropagidae.

It is native to Eurasia and Northern America.
