= Brunella =

Brunella can refer to:

- Brunella Forel, 1917, ant, synonym of Malagidris
- Brunella Smith, 1909, copepod, synonym of Calamoecia
- Brunella Mill., plant, synonym of Prunella
