= Boeckella shieli =

Conservation status
- Vulnerable (IUCN 2.3)

Scientific classification
- Kingdom: Animalia
- Phylum: Arthropoda
- Class: Copepoda
- Order: Calanoida
- Family: Centropagidae
- Genus: Boeckella
- Species: B. shieli

Binomial name
- Boeckella shieli Bayly, 1985

Species of crustacean

Boeckella shieli is a species of calanoid copepod in the family Centropagidae.

The IUCN conservation status of Boeckella shieli is "VU", vulnerable. The species faces a high risk of endangerment in the medium term. The IUCN status was reviewed in 1996.
