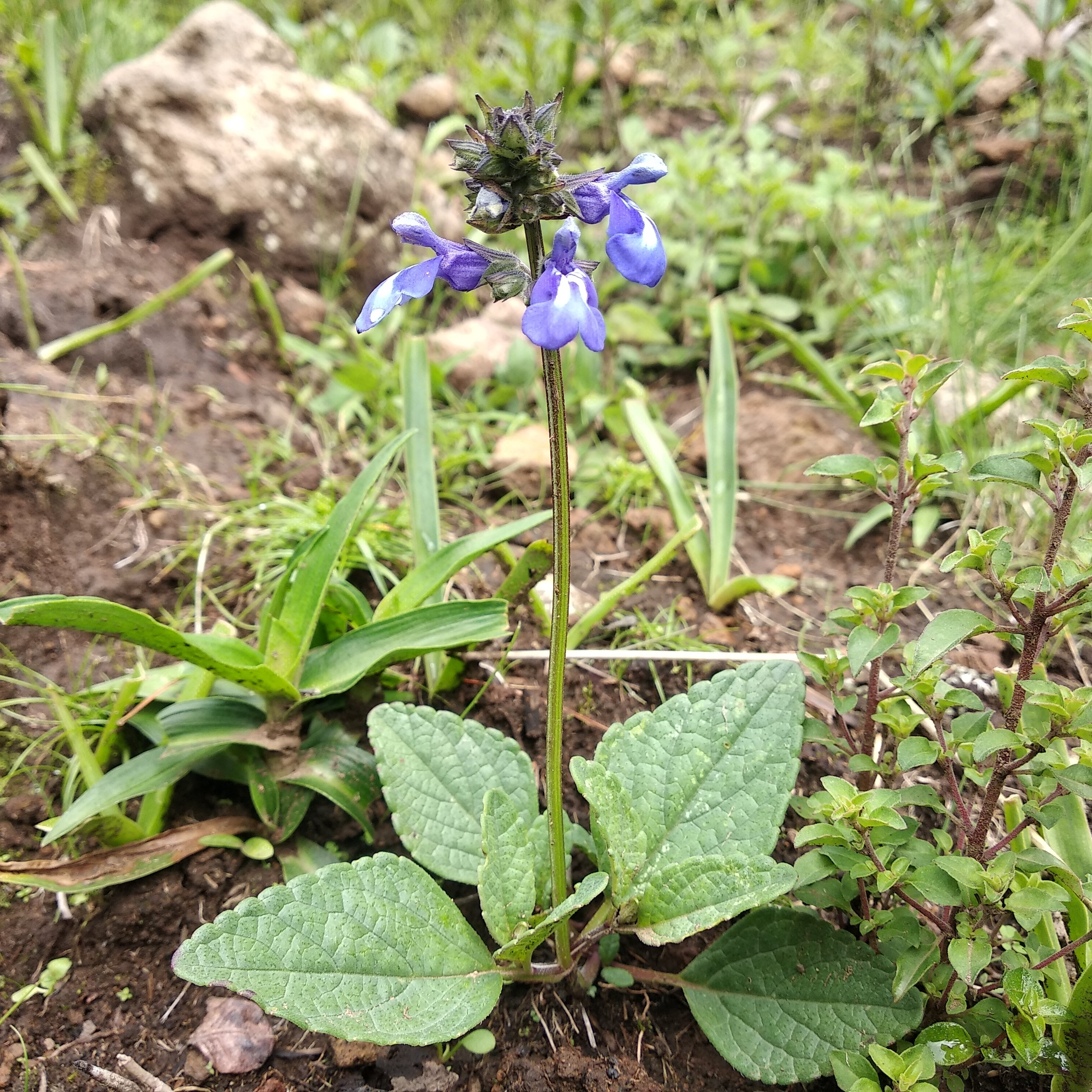

Scientific classification
- Kingdom: Plantae
- Clade: Tracheophytes
- Clade: Angiosperms
- Clade: Eudicots
- Clade: Asterids
- Order: Lamiales
- Family: Lamiaceae
- Genus: Salvia
- Species: S. prunelloides

Binomial name
- Salvia prunelloides Kunth

Synonyms
- Salvia forreri Greene; Salvia glechomifolia Kunth; Salvia lentiginosa Brandegee; Salvia parrasana Brandegee; Salvia reticulata M.Martens & Galeotti; Salvia rhombifolia Sessé & Moc., nom. illeg.; Salvia trichandra Briq.

= Salvia prunelloides =

Species of flowering plant

Salvia prunelloides, synonyms including Salvia forreri and Salvia glechomifolia, is a perennial native to Mexico. It was named in 1817 by Carl Sigismund Kunth for its similarity to Prunella vulgaris.

Salvia prunelloides is a small procumbent plant with nodules on its roots that spreads through underground runners. The lax stems are less than 1 foot long, with small trowel-shaped leaves that reach up to 1.25 inches long by 0.75 inches wide, with a 0.5 inch petiole. The leaves give off a faint hay-like aroma when brushed. Flowering is sporadic, with 0.5 inch periwinkle-blue flowers that grow in tight whorls at the end of the inflorescence. The flower's upper lip is hooded and small, with the lower lip three times as long. The lower lip has faint white markings leading to the pollen inside.

As of April 2024, Salvia glechomifolia was regarded as a synonym of Salvia prunelloides, but has been described as a separate species, taller than S. prunelloides with longer 1 inch blue-violet flowers.

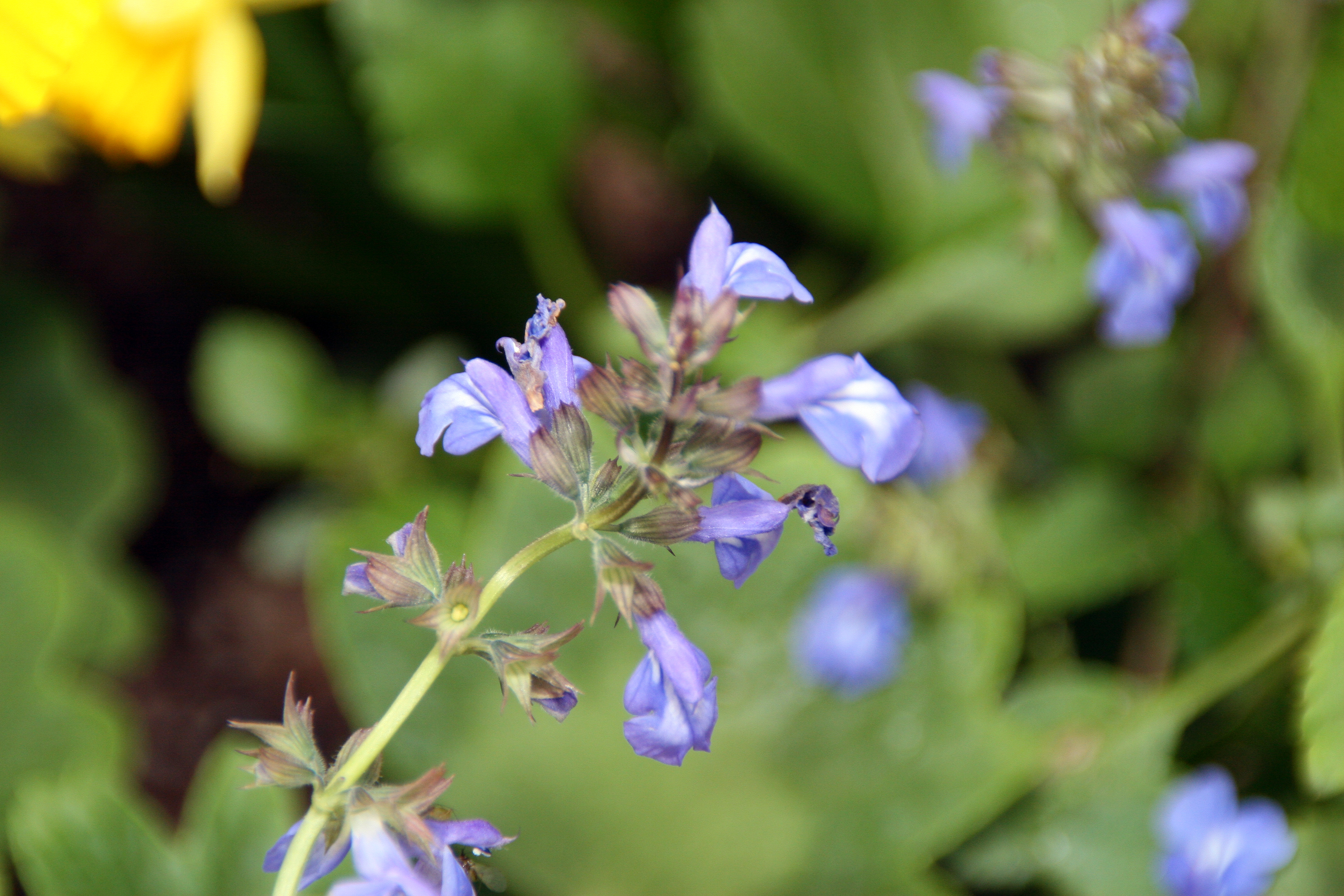
Flowers
