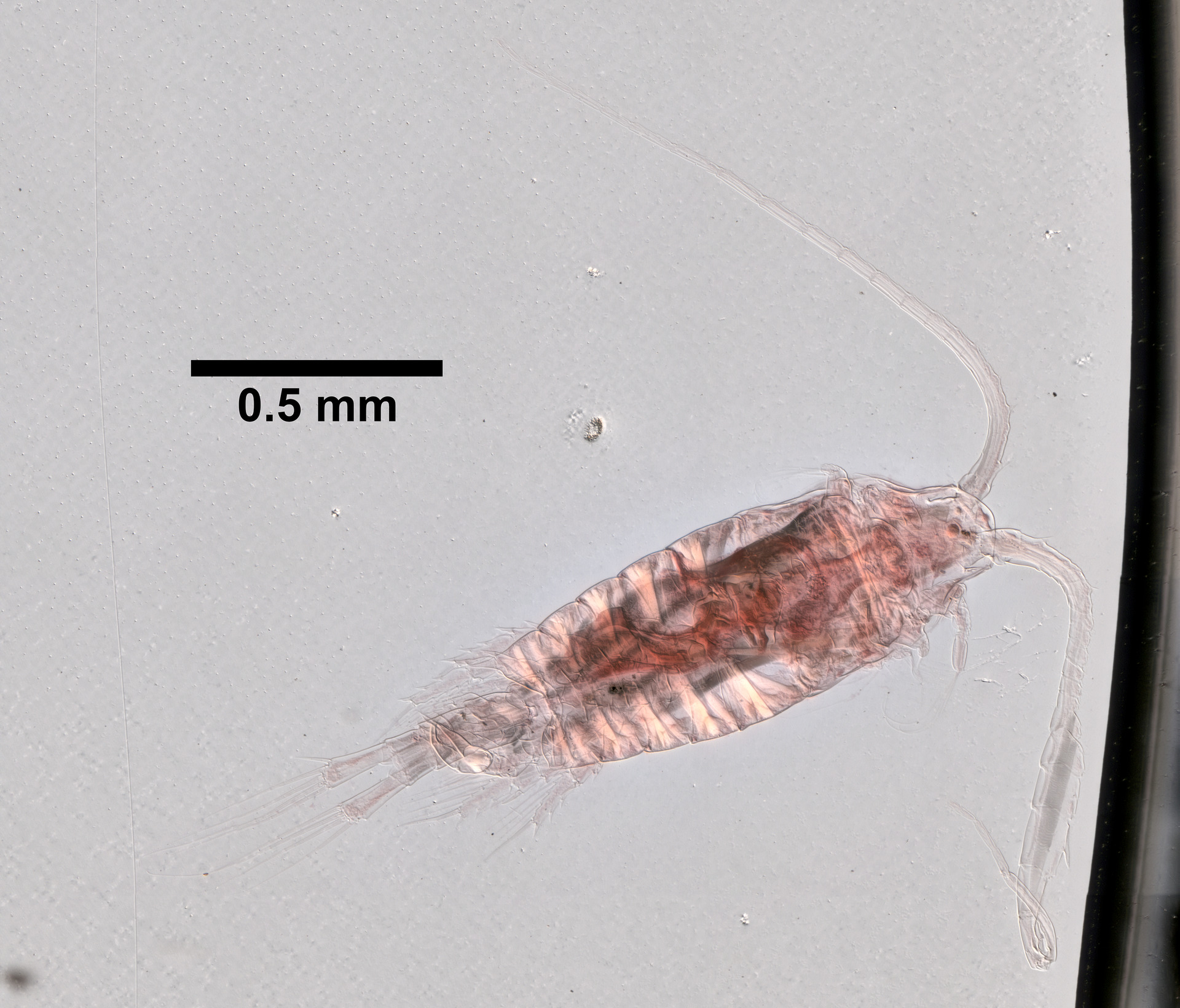

Scientific classification
- Kingdom: Animalia
- Phylum: Arthropoda
- Clade: Pancrustacea
- Class: Copepoda
- Order: Calanoida
- Family: Centropagidae
- Genus: Centropages
- Species: C. typicus

Binomial name
- Centropages typicus Krøyer, 1849

= Centropages typicus =

Species of copepod

Centropages typicus is a species of copepod. First described by Henrik Krøyer in 1849, It is one of the most abundant and well studied copepods in the Calanoida order. The species exhibits both morphological and genetic variation across its geographic range.

== Distribution and habitat ==
Centropages typicus has a wide distribution in the North Atlantic and the Mediterranean Sea. It primarily resides in costal and neritic environments. These area include the inner regions of continental shelfs or shallow banks. These could include estuaries that have shallow waters and high salinity. Centropages typicus also on occasion experience seasonal expansion where communities of living over a continental shelf edge expand into environments near the continental slope.

Centropages typicus ranks among the most prevalent copepod species in continental shelfs in North Atlantic and the Mediterranean Sea. They can account for 10-50% of the total copepod populations during certain seasons. The abundance of Centropages typicus is notably influenced by temperature, with abundance increasing a temperatures rise. The optimal growth temperature is 13°C to 20°C.

== Feeding ecology ==
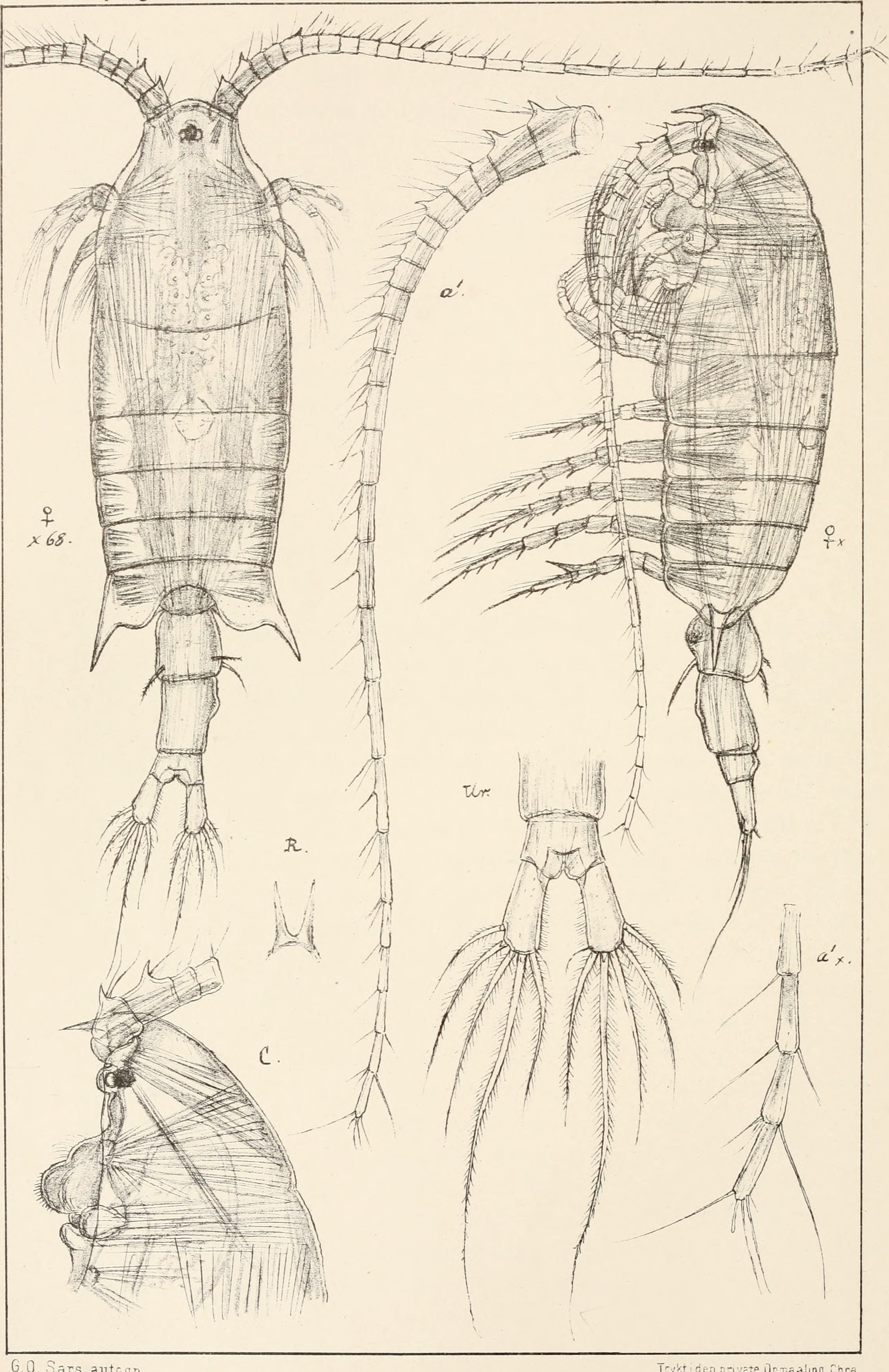
illustration of Centropages typicus and appendages

Centropages typicus is an omnivorous species with a wide range of prey. Their prey can range from small algae including diatoms, flagellates, and dinoflagellates, to yolk sacs of fish larve. They ingest relatively large particles with their preferred prey size limit is greater than 10 μm; Centropages typicus can even ingest yolk sacs larger than their own size. Like other copepod species a major prey for Centropages typicus are Microzooplankton, with the Protozoa Strombidium sulcatom being preferred. Similarly, Centropages typicus prefer ciliate prey likely because they have more nutritional value then algae and are more likely encounter Centropages typicus.

The feeding ecology of Centropages typicus is influenced by a variety of variables. These include the physical condition of the organism, its developmental stage, and its endogenous rhythms. Centropages typicus use several tactics to catch their prey. They do not use a filtration process, but instead manipulate the food particles. For large, fast swimming prey they perform ambush strategies using mechanoreceptors which are also potentially used for particle handling. With smaller particles they preform feeding currents utilizing chemoreceptors which can increase the feed of the feeding current and recognize food particles. Centropages typicus use special appendages around their mouth to form feeding currents.

Males do not feed as often as the females, and males also have a more restricted migrating capacity. Temperature has been found to have a slight effect of feeding rates of Centropages typicus. Generally, as temperature increases so does feeding rates, with the ideal temperature being 15-18°C.

== Ecological significance ==
Centropages typicus sit at a crucial intersection between small producers and their larger predators, moving energy up trophic levels. Their abundance shapes the health and survival of the rest of the marine food web, including important fish and endangered animals like the North Atlantic right whale. Small changes in their population can have cascading effects throughout the ecosystem. Like other copepods, Centropages typicus is a major food source for many species. Some of these species include other such as Chaetognaths, Northern krill, and Oligotrichs. Other species that prey on Centropages typicus are primarily small bony fish.

Centropages typicus abundance shifts due to environmental factors such as temperature, salinity, and nutrient availability. Centropages typicus abundance generally increases in warmer waters. As sea surface temperatures rise in the North Atlantic and the Mediterranean Sea due to fluctuations in the North Atlantic Oscillation and the Atlantic Multidecadal Oscillation, so does Centropages typicus abundance. Growth in Centropages typicus populations may have negative effects on other copepod populations, such as Temora stylifera and Calanus finmarchicus, as they compete for limited nutrients that are declining due to fluctuations in the climate index phases.
