= Calamoecia australica =

Conservation status
- Vulnerable (IUCN 2.3)

Scientific classification
- Kingdom: Animalia
- Phylum: Arthropoda
- Class: Copepoda
- Order: Calanoida
- Family: Centropagidae
- Genus: Calamoecia
- Species: C. australica

Binomial name
- Calamoecia australica Sars G.O., 1908

Species of crustacean

Calamoecia australica is a species of calanoid copepod in the family Centropagidae.

The IUCN conservation status of Calamoecia australica is "VU", vulnerable. The species faces a high risk of endangerment in the medium term. The IUCN status was reviewed in 1996.
