= Centropages elegans =

Scientific classification
- Domain: Eukaryota
- Kingdom: Animalia
- Phylum: Arthropoda
- Class: Copepoda
- Order: Calanoida
- Family: Centropagidae
- Genus: Centropages
- Species: C. elegans

Binomial name
- Centropages elegans Giesbrecht, 1895

Species of crustacean

Centropages elegans is a marine species of copepod in the genus Centropages.
