= Calamoecia elongata =

Conservation status
- Vulnerable (IUCN 2.3)

Scientific classification
- Kingdom: Animalia
- Phylum: Arthropoda
- Class: Copepoda
- Order: Calanoida
- Family: Centropagidae
- Genus: Calamoecia
- Species: C. elongata

Binomial name
- Calamoecia elongata Bayly, 1979

Species of crustacean

Calamoecia elongata is a species of calanoid copepod in the family Centropagidae.

The IUCN conservation status of Calamoecia elongata is "VU", vulnerable. The species faces a high risk of endangerment in the medium term. The IUCN status was reviewed in 1996.
