= Marguerite Henry (scientist) =

Australian zoologist (1895–1982)

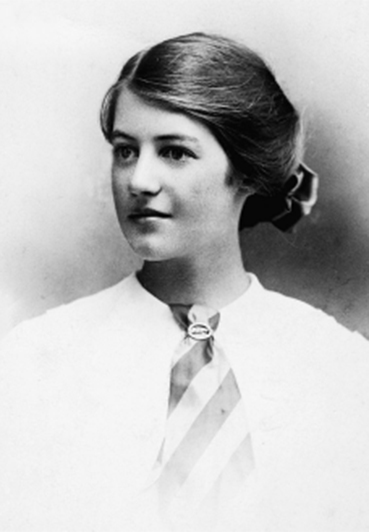
- Henry in 1916
- Born: 12 November 1895; Sydney, Australia
- Died: 1982 (aged 86–87)
- Other name: Marguerite Cooper
- Education: Bachelor of Science in Zoology and Botany (1917)
- Known for: Australian zoologist

Marguerite Henry (12 November 1895 – 1982) was an Australian zoologist known for her research on freshwater crustaceans. Henry's work was primarily on entomostracans, describing a dozen of new species and establishing a new genus of copepods, Gladioferens. She stopped contributing to zoology after her marriage.

== Early life ==
Henry was born in 1886 in Sydney, Australia. Known as Madge at school, she began her education at MLC School in 1907 at the age of 11. In her final year at MLC, she was awarded the 1913 Speech Night prizes for Senior French and Senior Botany Science Diagrams. She achieved honors in English and Botany in the Leaving Certificate and won a University Exhibition scholarship to the University of Sydney.

She enrolled at the University of Sydney, where she studied zoology. She graduated with a Bachelor of Science in Zoology and Botany degree in 1917.

== Academic career ==
Henry worked as an assistant zoologist for a special committee of the Commonwealth Advisory Council of Science and Industry, focusing on the life history of the nematode Onchocerca gibsoni, a parasite of cattle. The findings were published in the 1920 Proceedings of the Linnean Society with descriptions of new species.

From 1919 to 1924, Henry also conducted research on freshwater entomostracans from Australia and New Zealand. During this time, she identified seven species in the copepod subclass and the calanoid genus Gladioferens. She also described twelve new species of cladocerans, eight new ostracodes, and six new phyllopods.

== Awards and honours ==
In 1921 Henry was elected a fellow in zoology at the Linnean Society of New South Wales.

== Personal life ==
Henry married Dr. Arthur Cooper, a radiologist. After their marriage, she stopped contributing to the field. She died in 1982.

Henry is commemorated in the names of two freshwater crustacean copepod species: Gladioferens henryae (Brehm, 1950) and Canthocamptus henryae (Hamond, 1988). A third species found in Queensland, Ozestheria henryae, (Schwentner & Hethke, 2025) also honours her work.

== See also ==
- Women in science
