= All heal =

Common name for several plant species

All heal, allheal or all-heal may refer to a number of plants used medicinally including:

- Prunella vulgaris, a species in the mint family
- Stachys, a genus of plants in the mint family
- Valeriana officinalis, a species in the valerian family
