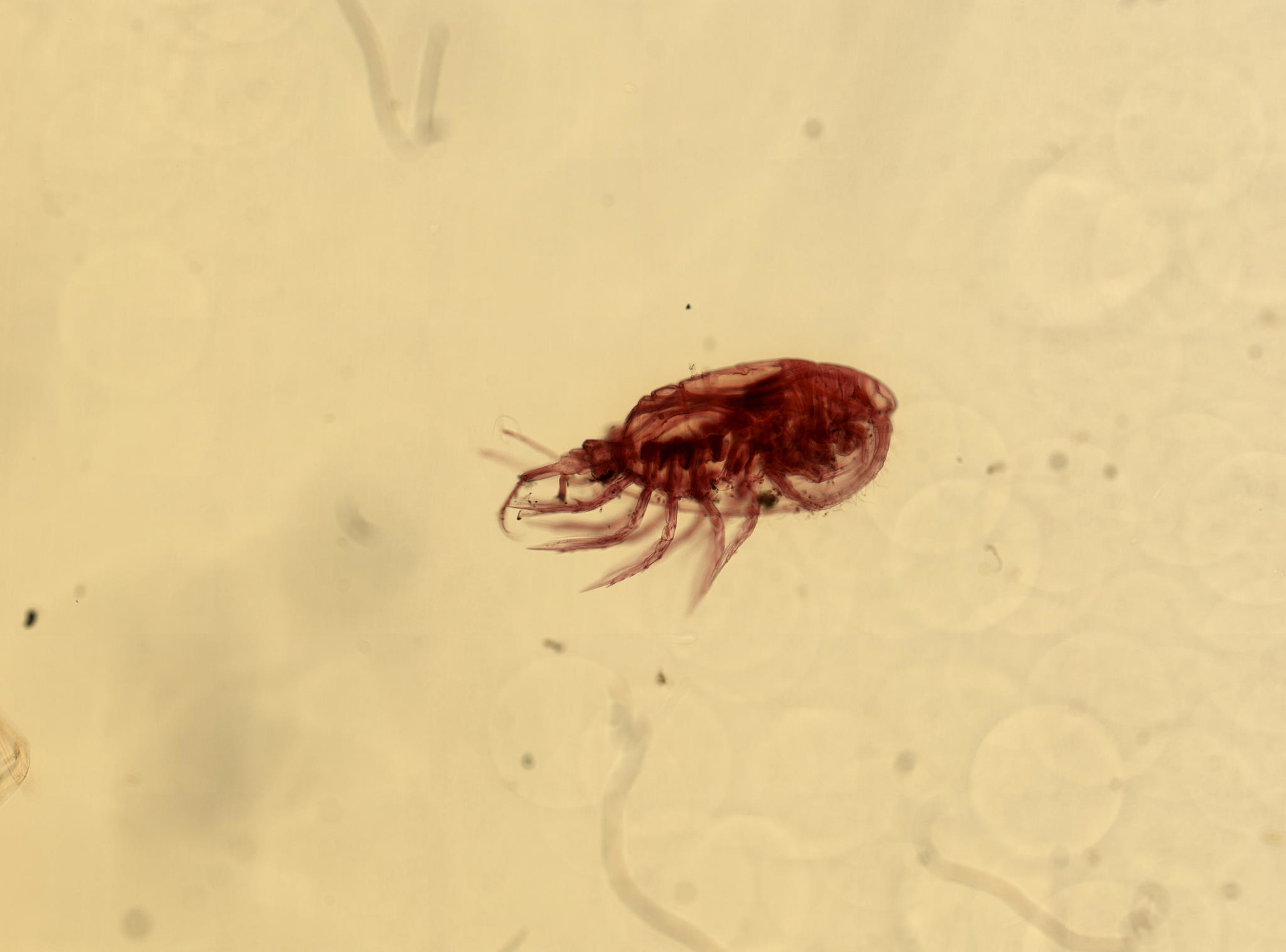
- Centropages typicus

Scientific classification
- Kingdom: Animalia
- Phylum: Arthropoda
- Class: Copepoda
- Order: Calanoida
- Family: Centropagidae
- Genus: Centropages; Krøyer, 1849

Species
- See text

= Centropages =

Genus of copepod crustaceans

Centropages is a genus of copepods in the family Centropagidae with 34 known marine species. The genus was first described in 1849 by Henrik Nikolai Krøyer.

Species of this marine genus are found worldwide.

== Species ==
Species accepted as of October 2023 are:

- Centropages abdominalis Sato, 1913
- Centropages acutus McKinnon & Dixon, 1994
- Centropages aegypticus El-Sherbiny & Ueda, 2008
- Centropages alcocki Sewell, 1912
- Centropages aucklandicus Krämer, 1895
- Centropages australiensis Fairbridge, 1944
- Centropages brachiatus (Dana, 1849)
- Centropages bradyi Wheeler, 1900
- Centropages brevifurcus Shen & Lee, 1963
- Centropages calaninus (Dana, 1849)
- Centropages caribbeanensis Park, 1970
- Centropages chierchiae Giesbrecht, 1889
- Centropages dorsispinatus Thompson I.C. & Scott A., 1903
- Centropages elegans Giesbrecht, 1895
- Centropages elongatus Giesbrecht, 1896
- Centropages furcatus (Dana, 1852)
- Centropages gracilis (Dana, 1849)
- Centropages halinus McKinnon & Kimmerer, 1988
- Centropages hamatus (Lilljeborg, 1853)
- Centropages karachiensis Haq & Rehman, 1973
- Centropages kroyeri Giesbrecht, 1892
- Centropages longicornis Mori, 1932
- Centropages maigo Ohtsuka, Itoh & Mizushima, 2005
- Centropages mohamedi El-Sherbiny & Al-Aidaroos, 2015
- Centropages natalensis Connell, 1981
- Centropages orsinii Giesbrecht, 1889
- Centropages ponticus Karavaev, 1895
- Centropages sinensis Chen & Zhang, 1965
- Centropages spinosus (Krichagin, 1873)
- Centropages tenuiremis Thompson I.C. & Scott A., 1903
- Centropages trispinosus Sewell, 1914
- Centropages typicus Krøyer, 1849
- Centropages uedai El-Sherbiny, 2011
- Centropages velificatus (Oliveira, 1947)
- Centropages violaceus (Claus, 1863)
