= Hemiboeckella =

Scientific classification
- Domain: Eukaryota
- Kingdom: Animalia
- Phylum: Arthropoda
- Class: Copepoda
- Order: Calanoida
- Family: Centropagidae
- Genus: Hemiboeckella; G. O. Sars, 1912

Genus of crustaceans

Hemiboeckella is a genus of crustacean in family Centropagidae. It contains the following species:

- Hemiboeckella andersonae Bayly, 1974
- Hemiboeckella powellensis Bayly, 1979
- Hemiboeckella searli G. O. Sars, 1912
