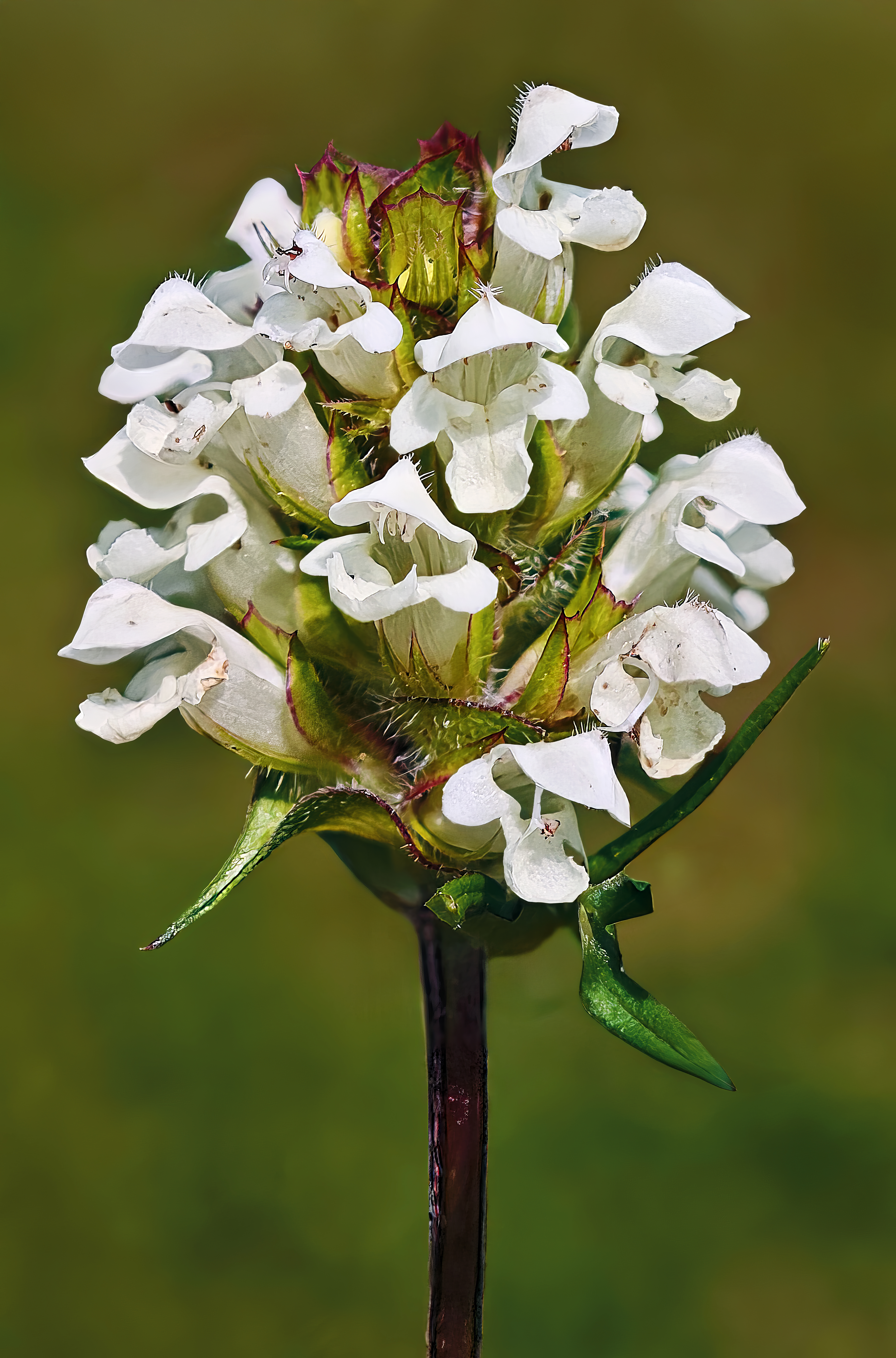

Scientific classification
- Kingdom: Plantae
- Clade: Tracheophytes
- Clade: Angiosperms
- Clade: Eudicots
- Clade: Asterids
- Order: Lamiales
- Family: Lamiaceae
- Genus: Prunella
- Species: P. laciniata

Binomial name
- Prunella laciniata (L.)
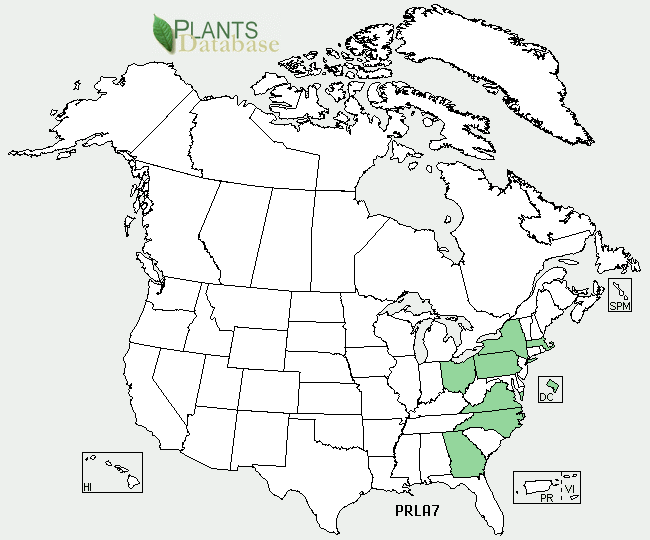

= Prunella laciniata =

Cutleaf selfheal

Species of flowering plant

Prunella laciniata, the cutleaf selfheal, is a plant in the family Lamiaceae.

Sometimes it hybridises with P. vulgaris, the result being P. × intermedia; other times with P. grandiflora, the result being P. × dissecta.
