= Limnocalanus =

Scientific classification
- Kingdom: Animalia
- Phylum: Arthropoda
- Class: Copepoda
- Order: Calanoida
- Family: Centropagidae
- Genus: Limnocalanus; Sars G.O.

Synonyms
- Gigantella Ekman, 1905; Parabroteas Mrázek, 1901

Genus of crustaceans

Limnocalanus is a genus of Centropagidae.

The genus was described in 1863 by Georg Ossian Sars.

The genus has cosmopolitan distribution.

Species:

- Limnocalanus johanseni Marsh, 1920
- Limnocalanus michaelseni (Mrázek, 1901)
- Limnocalanus sarsi Daday, 1901
