= Gladioferens =

Scientific classification
- Domain: Eukaryota
- Kingdom: Animalia
- Phylum: Arthropoda
- Class: Copepoda
- Order: Calanoida
- Family: Centropagidae
- Genus: Gladioferens; Henry, 1919

Genus of crustaceans

Gladioferens is a genus of copepods in the family Centropagidae, found in coastal marine and lagoon habitats in the Southern Hemisphere. It contains the following species:

- Gladioferens antarcticus Bayly, 1994
- Gladioferens imparipes Thomson, 1946
- Gladioferens inermis Nicholls, 1944
- Gladioferens pectinatus (Brady, 1899)
- Gladioferens spinosus Henry, 1919
- Gladioferens symmetricus Bayly, 1963
