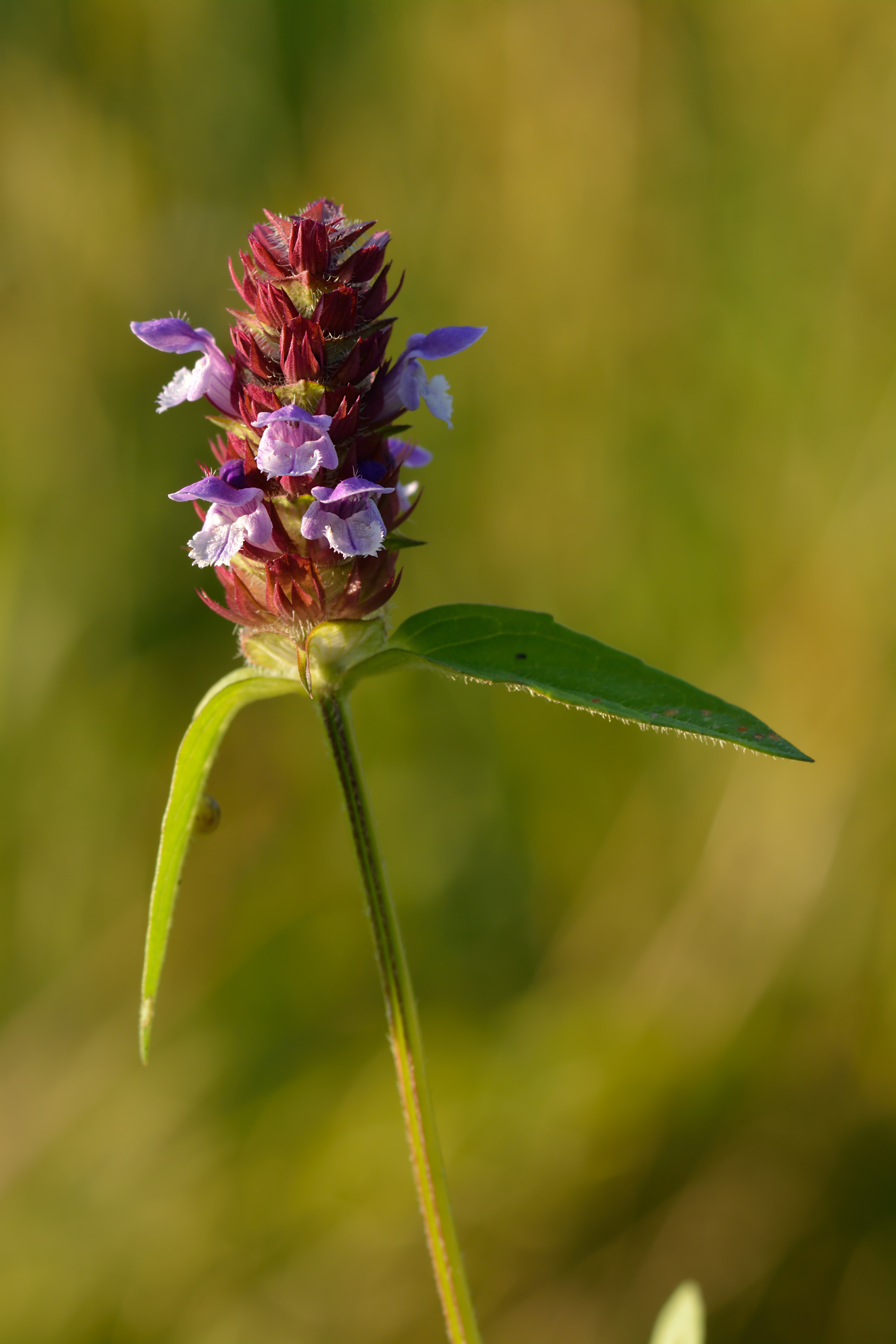
- Prunella vulgaris (Common Self-heal)

Scientific classification
- Kingdom: Plantae
- Clade: Embryophytes
- Clade: Tracheophytes
- Clade: Angiosperms
- Clade: Eudicots
- Clade: Asterids
- Order: Lamiales
- Family: Lamiaceae
- Subfamily: Nepetoideae
- Tribe: Mentheae
- Genus: Prunella; L.

Synonyms
- Brunella Mill.; Prunellopsis Kudô

= Prunella (plant) =

Genus of flowering plants in mint family

Prunella is a genus of herbaceous plants in the family Lamiaceae, also known as self-heals, heal-all, or allheal for their use in herbal medicine.

== Habitat ==
Most are native to Europe, Asia, and North Africa, but Prunella vulgaris (common self-heal) is Holarctic in distribution, occurring in North America as well, and is a common lawn weed. Prunellas are low-growing plants, and thrive in moist wasteland and grass, spreading rapidly to cover the ground. They are members of the mint family and have the square stem common to mints.

== Biological descriptions ==
The common name "self-heal" derives from the use of some species to treat a range of minor disorders. Self-heal can be grown from seed, or by dividing clumps in spring or autumn.

Species

1. Prunella albanica Pénzes – Albania
2. Prunella × bicolor Beck – parts of Europe (P. grandiflora × P. laciniata)
3. Prunella × codinae Sennen – Spain (P. hyssopifolia × P. laciniata)
4. Prunella cretensis Gand. – Crete
5. Prunella × gentianifolia Pau – Spain (P. hyssopifolia × P. vulgaris)
6. Prunella grandiflora (L.) Scholler – central + southern Europe from Caucasus to Russia; Caucasus
7. Prunella hyssopifolia L. – Spain, France, Italy, Morocco
8. Prunella × intermedia Link – central + southwestern Europe (P. laciniata × P. vulgaris)
9. Prunella laciniata (L.) L – central + southern Europe, North Africa, Middle East
10. Prunella orientalis Bornm. – Turkey, Syria
11. Prunella prunelliformis (Maxim.) Makino – Japan
12. Prunella × surrecta Dumort. – central + southwestern Europe (P. grandiflora × P. vulgaris)
13. Prunella vulgaris L. – widespread in Europe, North Africa, Asia, North America; naturalized in New Zealand, parts of South America

Subspecies are

- Prunella vulgaris ssp. aleutica (Fernald) Hultén – Aleutian selfheal
- Prunella vulgaris ssp. lanceolata (W. Bartram) Hultén – lance selfheal
- Prunella vulgaris ssp. vulgaris (L.) – common selfheal

== Uses ==
=== Traditional medicine ===
Dried Prunella
- Traditional Chinese: 夏枯草
- Simplified Chinese: 夏枯草
Transcriptions
Standard Mandarin
- Hanyu Pinyin: xia^{4} ku^{1} cao^{3}
Yue: Cantonese
- Yale Romanization: hah^{5} fu^{1} chou^{2}
- Jyutping: haa^{5} fu^{1} cou^{2}
- IPA: [ha̬fútsʰǒu]

In the Pacific Northwest, its juice was used by the Quinault and the Quileute on boils. They also used the whole plant to treat cuts and inflammations. Ointments can be made by fixing the plant with grease. Dried Prunella (Chinese: 夏枯草; pinyin: xià kū cǎo) is used to make a herbal drink. Prunella is also used for halitosis, especially when combined with other herbs (e.g. perilla, field mint, etc.). Herbal tea for treating ozostomia caused by oral local lesion

=== Food uses ===
The mildly bitter leaves are also good as salad greens. Prunella species are used as food plants by the larvae of some Lepidoptera species including Coleophora albitarsella.

=== As a health supplement ===
Prunella vulgaris is used as an ingredient in some bodybuilding supplements.

== Bibliography ==
- Šegota, Vedran; Alegro, Antun; Rimac, Anja; Šoštarić, Renata; Sedlar, Zorana; Borovečki-Voska, Ljiljana; Salkić, Behija (2015-03-03). "Nova nalazišta hibrida roda Prunella L. u Hrvatskoj" [New Find Sites of Hybrids of the Genus Prunella L. in Croatia]. Glasnik Hrvatskog botaničkog društva (in Croatian). 3 (1): 4–6. eISSN 1848-8102.
