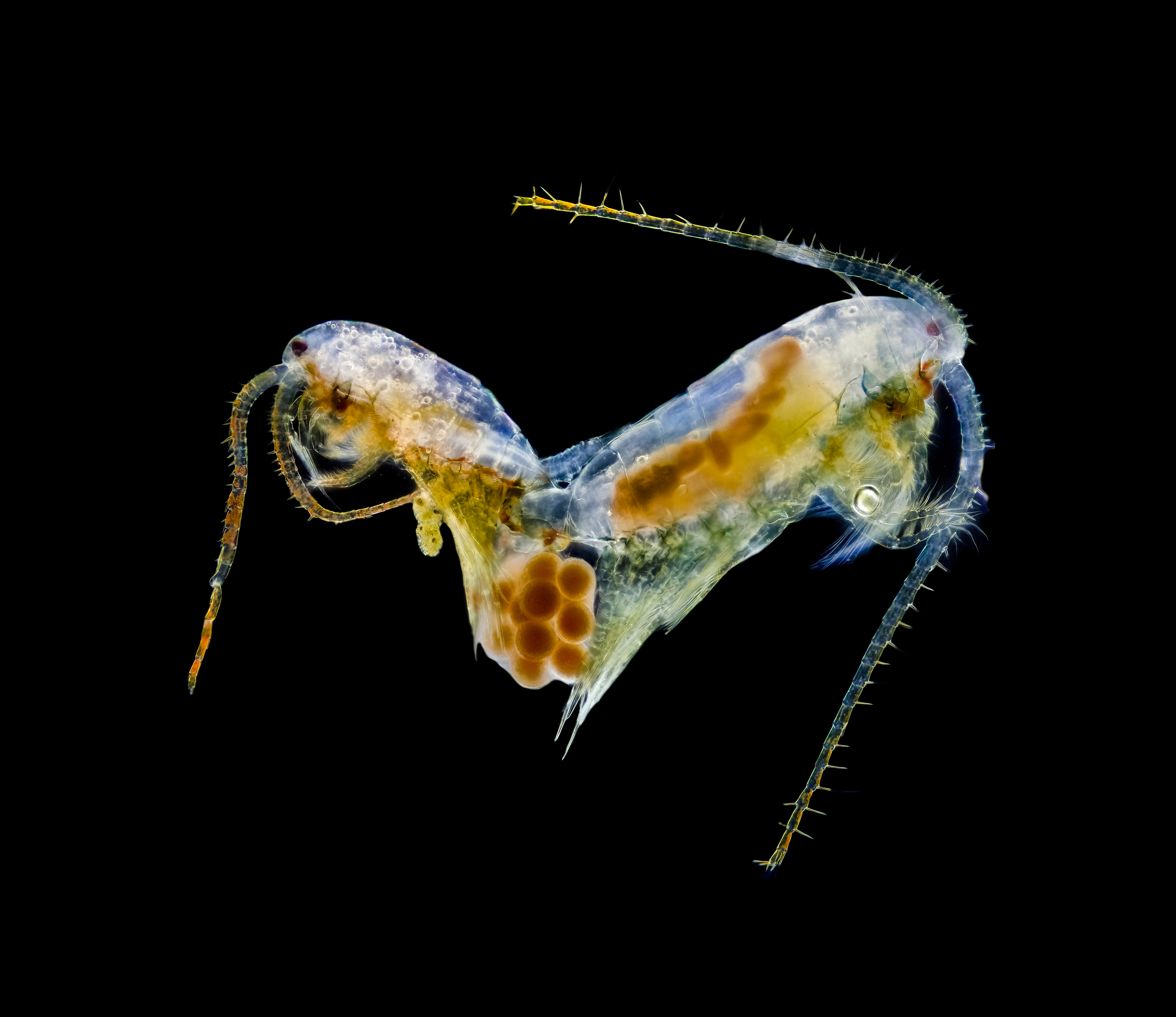
- Mating of Boeckella gracilis observed in dark field microscopy.

Scientific classification
- Kingdom: Animalia
- Phylum: Arthropoda
- Class: Copepoda
- Order: Calanoida
- Family: Centropagidae
- Genus: Boeckella; De Guerne & Richard, 1889

Synonyms
- List: Boeckellina Mrázek, 1901; Boeckellopsis Mrázek, 1901; Karukinka Menu-Marque, 2003; Metaboeckella Eckman, 1906; Paraboeckella Mrázek, 1901; Pseudoboeckella Mrázek, 1901

= Boeckella =

Genus of crustaceans

Boeckella is a genus of copepods in the family Centropagidae.

== Species ==
The genus Boeckella contains 49 species, of which five are listed as vulnerable species on the IUCN Red List – the Australian endemics B. bispinosa, B. geniculata, B. nyoraensis, B. shieli, and B. calcaris from Bolivia and Peru.

- Boeckella ambigua Percival, 1937
- Boeckella antiqua Menu-Marque & Balseiro, 2000
- Boeckella asymmetrica Searle, 1914
- Boeckella bergi Richard, 1897
- Boeckella bispinosa Bayly, 1967
- Boeckella brevicaudata (Brady, 1875)
- Boeckella calcaris (Harding, 1955)
- Boeckella coronaria Henry, 1922
- Boeckella delicata Percival, 1937
- Boeckella denticornis Brehm, 1950
- Boeckella diamantina Menu-Marque & Zúñiga, 1994
- Boeckella dilatata G. O. Sars, 1904
- Boeckella erubescens (Brehm, 1935)
- Boeckella fluvialis Henry, 1922
- Boeckella geniculata Bayly, 1964
- Boeckella gibbosa (Brehm, 1935)
- Boeckella gracilipes Daday, 1901
- Boeckella gracilis (Daday, 1902)
- Boeckella hamata Brehm, 1928
- Boeckella klutei (Brehm, 1926)
- Boeckella lacuna Fairbridge, 1945
- Boeckella longicauda Daday, 1901
- Boeckella longisetosa G. W. Smith, 1909
- Boeckella major Searle, 1938
- Boeckella meteoris Kiefer, 1928
- Boeckella michaelseni (Mrázek, 1901)
- Boeckella minuta G. O. Sars, 1896
- Boeckella montana Bayly, 1964
- Boeckella nyoraensis Searle, 1912
- Boeckella occidentalis Marsh, 1906
- Boeckella opaqua Fairbridge, 1945
- Boeckella palustris (Harding, 1955)
- Boeckella pilkililli Quinlan & Bayly, 2017
- Boeckella poopoensis Marsh, 1906
- Boeckella poppei (Mrázek, 1901)
- Boeckella propinqua G. O. Sars, 1904
- Boeckella pseudochelae Searle, 1912
- Boeckella robusta G. O. Sars, 1896
- Boeckella rubra G. W. Smith, 1909
- Boeckella saycei G. O. Sars, 1908
- Boeckella shieli Bayly, 1985
- Boeckella silvestri (Daday, 1901)
- Boeckella symmetrica G. O. Sars, 1908
- Boeckella tanea Chapman, 1973
- Boeckella thomseni Brehm, 1937
- Boeckella timmsi Bayly, 1998
- Boeckella titicacae Harding, 1955
- Boeckella triarticulata (G. M. Thomson, 1883)
- Boeckella vallentini (T. Scott, 1914)

== Taxonomic history ==
The genus was originally described by G. M. Thomson as "Boeckia", in honour of Jonas Axel Boeck (1833–1873). That name proved, however, to be a junior homonym of Boeckia, a genus of Amphipoda, and so Jules de Guerne and Jules Richard provided it with the replacement name Boeckella in 1889.
