= Calamoecia =

Scientific classification
- Kingdom: Animalia
- Phylum: Arthropoda
- Class: Copepoda
- Order: Calanoida
- Family: Centropagidae
- Genus: Calamoecia; Brady, 1906

Genus of crustaceans

Calamoecia is a genus of copepods in the family Centropagidae confined to Australasia. It is thought to have evolved since the separation of the Australian continent from Antarctica. Three of the Australian endemic species are listed as vulnerable species on the IUCN Red List (marked VU in the list below). The genus contains the following species:

- Calamoecia ampulla (Searle, 1911)
- Calamoecia attenuata (Fairbridge, 1945)
- Calamoecia australica G. O. Sars, 1908
- Calamoecia australis (Searle, 1911)
- Calamoecia baylyi Timms, 2001
- Calamoecia canberra Bayly, 1962
- Calamoecia clitellata Bayly, 1962
- Calamoecia elongata Bayly, 1979
- Calamoecia gibbosa (Brehm, 1950)
- Calamoecia halsei Bayly, 1998
- Calamoecia longicornis (Sars G.O., 1912)
- Calamoecia lucasi Brady, 1906
- Calamoecia salina (Nicholls, 1944)
- Calamoecia steeli (Henry, 1924)
- Calamoecia tasmanica (G. W. Smith, 1909)
- Calamoecia trifida Bayly, 1961
- Calamoecia trilobata Halse & McRae, 2001
- Calamoecia ultima (Brehm, 1960)
- Calamoecia viridis (Searle, 1911)
- Calamoecia zeidleri Bayly, 1984
