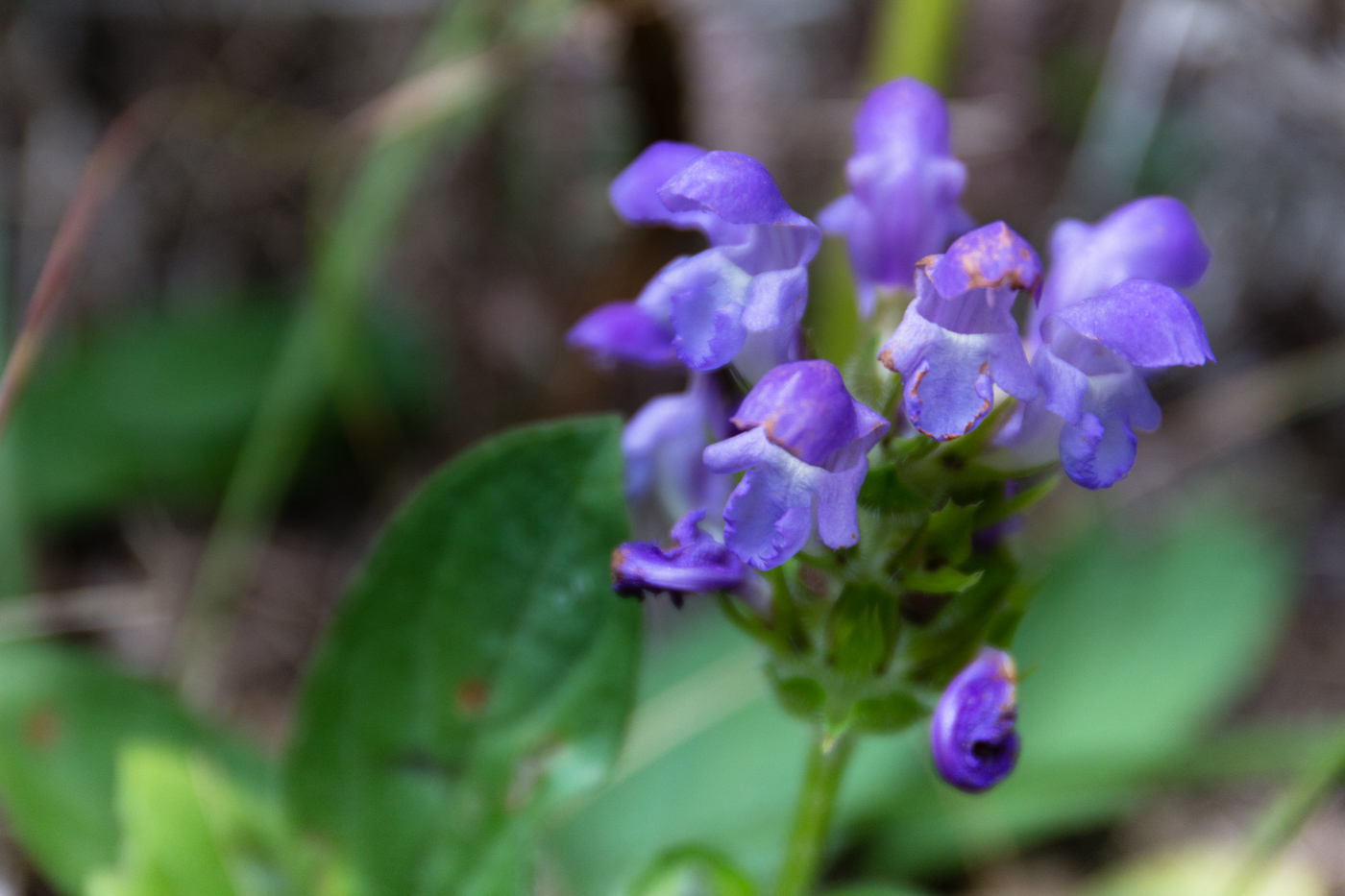

Scientific classification
- Kingdom: Plantae
- Clade: Tracheophytes
- Clade: Angiosperms
- Clade: Eudicots
- Clade: Asterids
- Order: Lamiales
- Family: Lamiaceae
- Genus: Prunella
- Species: P. grandiflora

Binomial name
- Prunella grandiflora (L.) Scholler

= Prunella grandiflora =

Large self-heal

Species of flowering plant

Prunella grandiflora, the large-flowered selfheal, is a species of flowering plant in the family Lamiaceae. It is native to Europe and neighboring parts of West Asia.
