= Ian Albert Edgar Bayly =

New Zealand born zoologist (1934 - )

Ian Albert Edgar Bayly (born 1934) is a New Zealand born Australian limnologist. He earned an M.Sc. from the University of New Zealand in 1959, a Ph.D. from University of Queensland in 1965 and a D.Sc. from Monash University in 1975. In Australia he has worked at University of Queensland and Monash University.

In 1975 he won the Hilary Jolly medal, which was awarded by the then Australian Society for Limnology, for an outstanding contribution to Australian limnology. Bayly Bay near Davis Station in Antarctica is named after him because of his work on Antarctic zoology.

His zoological abbreviation is Bayly.

== Selected publications ==
- Ian Albert Edgar Bayly (1972). "Salinity Tolerance and Osmotic Behavior of Animals in Athalassic Saline and Marine Hypersaline Waters". Annual Review of Ecology and Systematics. 3: 233–68. ISSN 0066-4162. JSTOR 2096848. Wikidata Q139104416.
- I A E Bayly (1999). "Review of how indigenous people managed for water in desert regions of Australia" (PDF). Journal of the Royal Society of Western Australia. 82: 17–25. ISSN 0035-922X. Wikidata Q139104552.
- J. W. G. Grant; I. A. E. Bayly (March 1981). "Predator induction of crests in morphs of the Daphnia carinata King complex". Limnology and Oceanography. 26 (2): 201–218. doi:10.4319/LO.1981.26.2.0201. ISSN 0024-3590. Wikidata Q139104921.
