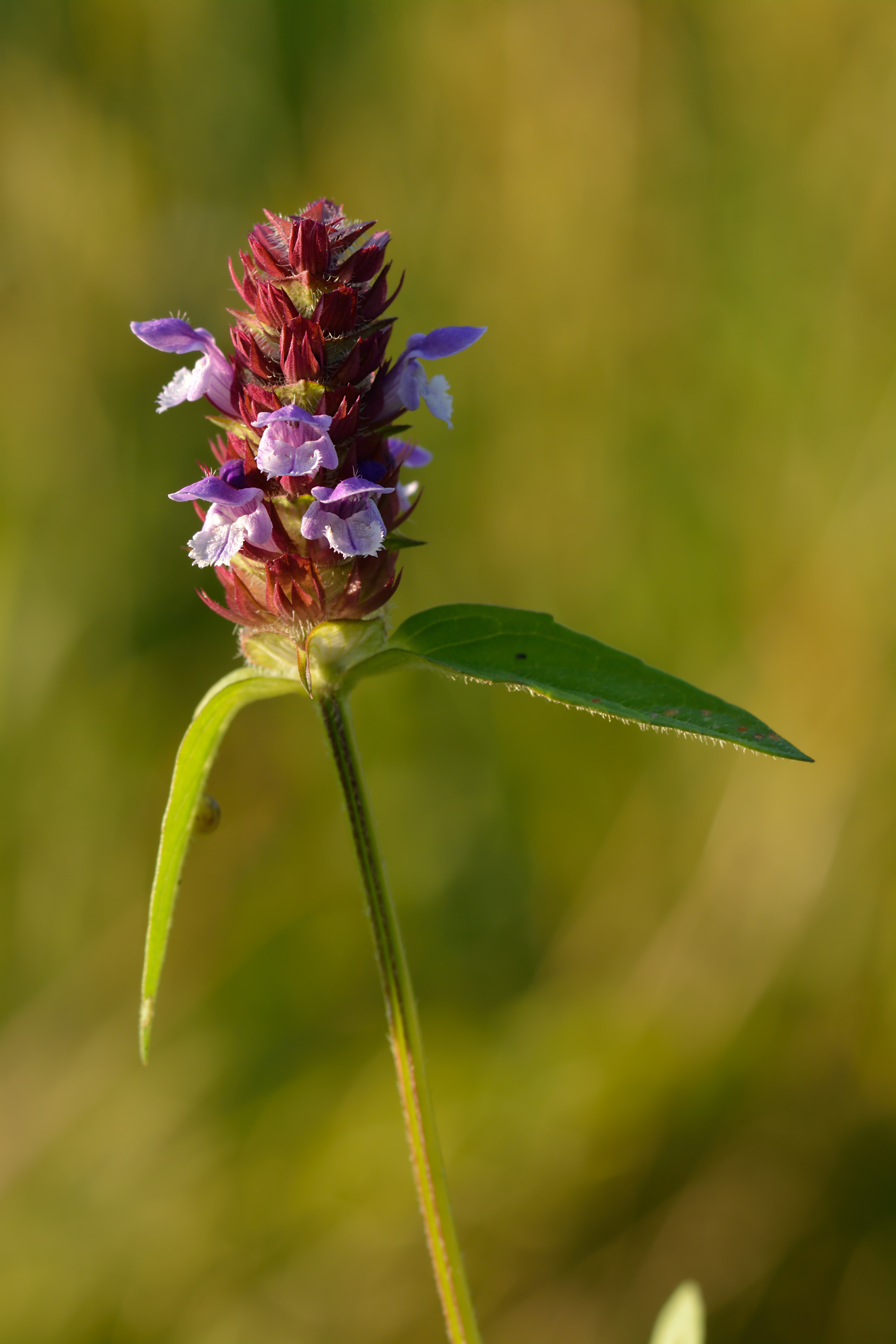

Conservation status
- Least Concern (IUCN 3.1)

- Secure (NatureServe)

Scientific classification
- Kingdom: Plantae
- Clade: Tracheophytes
- Clade: Angiosperms
- Clade: Eudicots
- Clade: Asterids
- Order: Lamiales
- Family: Lamiaceae
- Genus: Prunella
- Species: P. vulgaris

Binomial name
- Prunella vulgaris L.

Subspecies
- P. vulgaris subsp. asiatica; P. vulgaris subsp. estremadurensis; P. vulgaris subsp. hispida; P. vulgaris subsp. lanceolata; P. vulgaris subsp. vulgaris

= Prunella vulgaris =

Plant species in the mint family

Prunella vulgaris, the common self-heal, heal-all, woundwort, heart-of-the-earth, carpenter's herb, brownwort or blue curls, is an herbaceous flowering plant in the mint family (Lamiaceae).

== Etymology ==
Prunella is derived from 'Brunella', a word which is itself a derivative, taken from "die Bräune", the German name for diphtheria, which Prunella was historically used to cure. Vulgaris means 'usual', 'common', or 'vulgar'.

Self-heal and heal-all refer to its uses in traditional medicine.

== Description ==
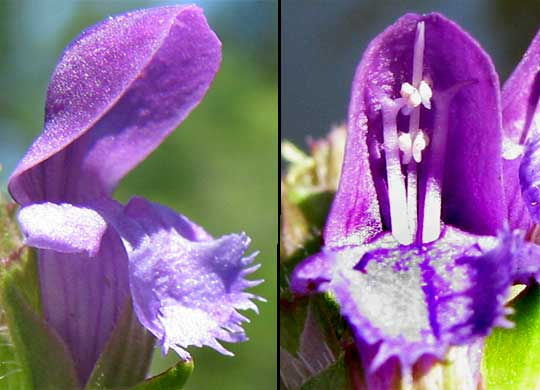
Closeup of flowers

Prunella vulgaris grows 5–30 cm (2.0–11.8 in) high, with creeping, square-ish, reddish stems branching at the leaf axils. The opposite leaves are lance-shaped or ovate, entire, and sometimes reddish at the tip. The leaf dimensions are 1.5–6 cm (0.59–2.36 in) long and 0.6–2.5 cm (0.24–0.98 in) broad. Each leaf has 3-7 veins that shoot off the middle vein to the margin. The petioles are generally short, but can be up to 5 cm (2.0 in) long.

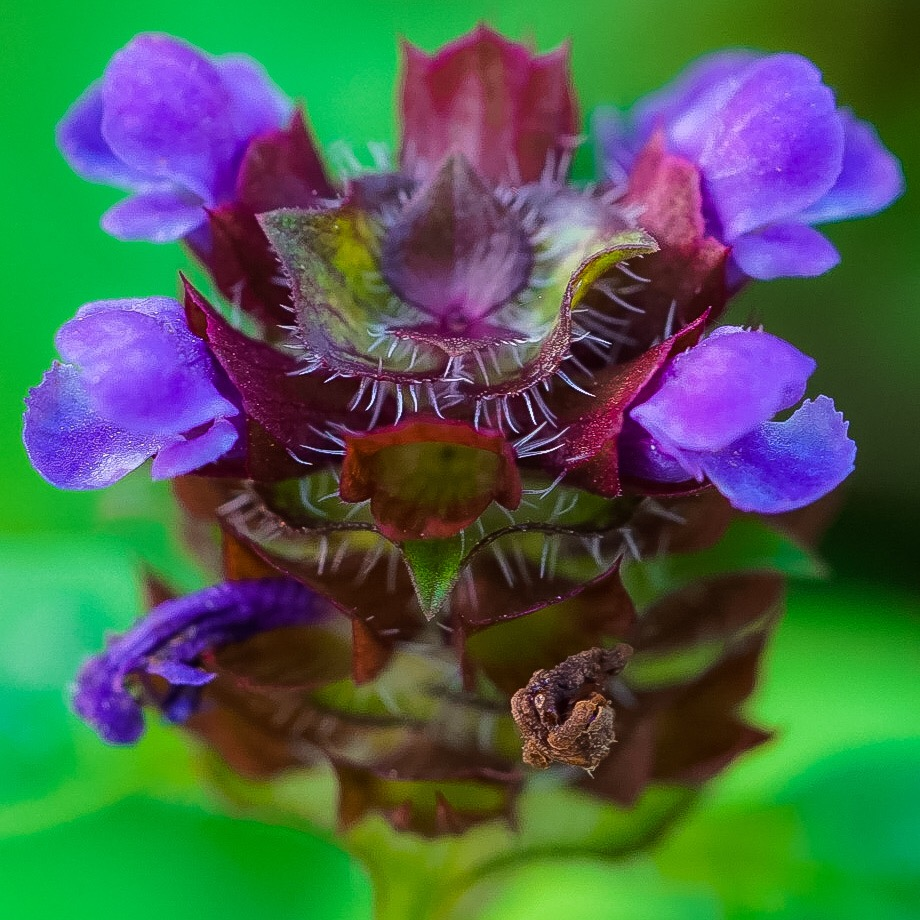

The flowers grow in tight, terminal clusters, forming a spike; immediately below the inflorescence is a pair of sessile bracts on either side like a collar. The purple (sometimes white) corollas are two-lipped and tubular. The upper lip forms a hood, and the lower lip forms a cup with a fringed margin. Flowers bloom at different times depending on climate and other conditions, but mostly in summer (from June to August in the USA).

Self-heal propagates both by seed and vegetatively by stolons that root at the nodes.

There are two described varieties of Prunella vulgaris: var. vulgaris and var. lanceolata.

Sometimes it hybridises with P. laciniata, the result known as P. × intermedia.

== Habitat ==
Prunella vulgaris is a perennial herb native in Europe, Asia, Africa, and North America, and is common in most temperate climates.

Prunella vulgaris can spread aggressively through creeping stolons and roots, forming dense mats that can displace other plants. Because of its ability to outcompete other desirable vegetation, it can become weedy in lawns and damp shady locations. Prunella vulgaris is listed in Weeds of the Northeast and Weeds of the Great Plains. It was introduced to many countries in the 1800s and has become invasive in the Pacific Islands, including Australia, New Zealand, and Hawaii. In Ireland, it is generally abundant. It also grows in Kashmir where it is known as kalyuth and used as a decoction to wash and bathe in order to relieve muscle pain.

It grows on roadsides, gardens, waste-places, and woodland edges, and usually in basic and neutral soils.

The conspicuous flowers are a favorite of bumblebees and butterflies. Prunella vulgaris is a host species for the larvae of the Clouded sulphur butterfly, Colias philodice.

== Uses ==
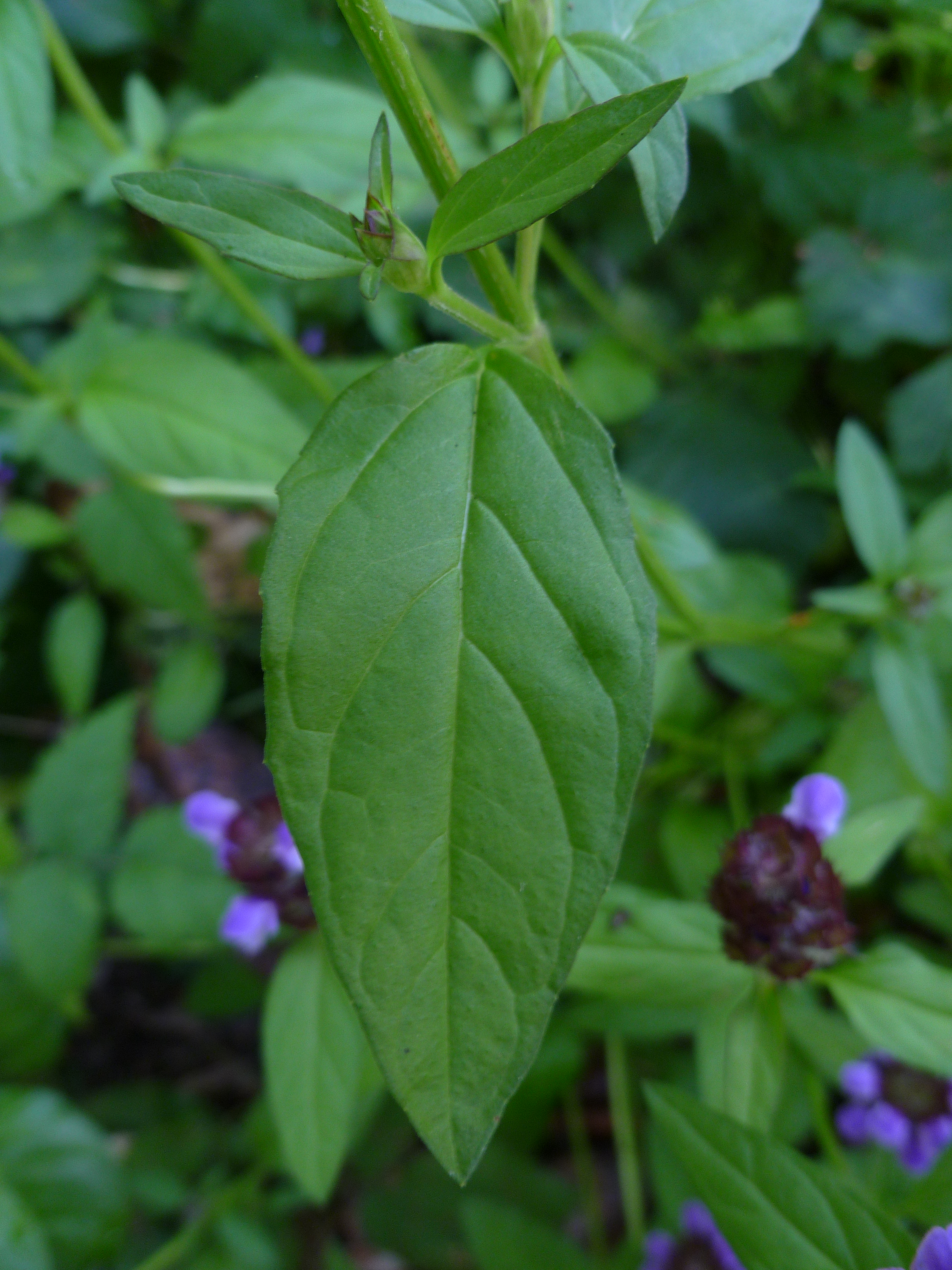
P. vulgaris var lanceolata

Prunella vulgaris is edible. The young leaves and stems can be eaten raw in salads; the plant as a whole can be boiled and eaten as a leaf vegetable; and the aerial parts of the plant can be powdered and brewed in a cold infusion to make a beverage.

This plant was used as a traditional medicine by the indigenous peoples of North America. The Quileute, Quinault, and Coast Salish in the Pacific Northwest extracted juice from the plant which was used as a topical treatment for boils. The Nuxalk boiled the entire plant to make a weak tea. The Nlaka'pamux drink a cold infusion of the whole plant as a common beverage.

The herb, which is called xia ku cao (夏枯草) in Chinese, is used in traditional Chinese medicine to treat dizziness, red eyes, dry cough, and dermatitis and boils. It is also a main ingredient in several herbal teas in southern China, including commercial beverages such as Wong Lo Kat.

== Phytochemicals ==
Phytochemicals include betulinic acid, D-camphor, D-fenchone, cyanidin, delphinidin, hyperoside, manganese (not a phytochemical), lauric acid, oleanolic acid, rosmarinic acid, myristic acid, rutin, linoleic acid, ursolic acid, beta-sitosterol, lupeol, and tannins.
