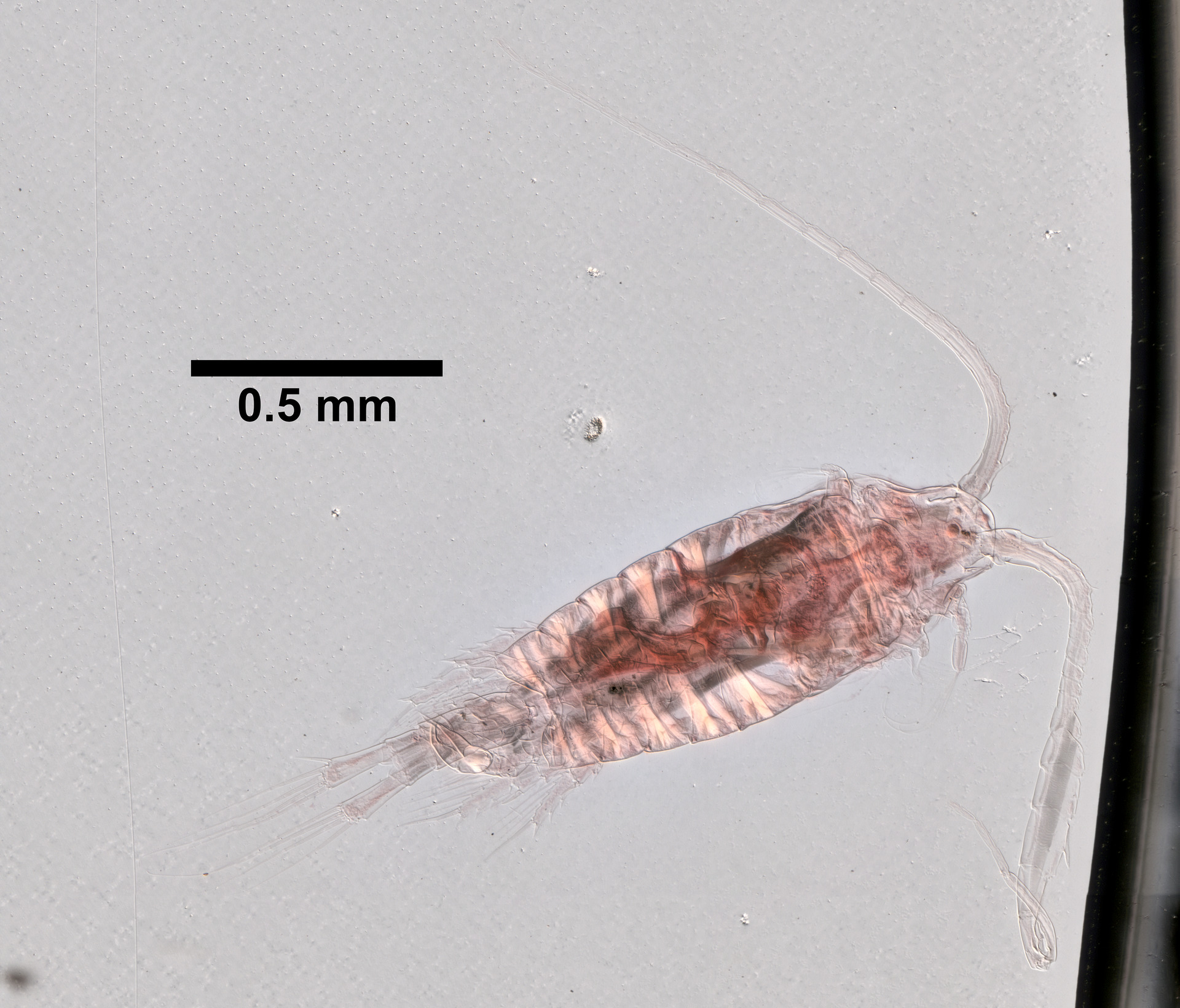
- Centropages typicus

Scientific classification
- Kingdom: Animalia
- Phylum: Arthropoda
- Clade: Pancrustacea
- Class: Copepoda
- Order: Calanoida
- Family: Centropagidae; Giesbrecht, 1893

Genera
- See text

= Centropagidae =

Family of crustaceans

Centropagidae is a family of copepods in the order Calanoida. Its members are particularly known as plankton in coastal waters and in fresh water in Australia and southern South America. They are also found on subantarctic islands and in lakes in Antarctica.

== Genera ==
There are 14 genera recognised in the family Centropagidae, including over 130 species.

- Boeckella De Guerne & Richard, 1889 — 49 species, freshwater
- Calamoecia Brady, 1906 — 18 species, freshwater
- Centropages Krøyer, 1849 — 35 species, marine
- Dussartopages Huys, 2009 — 1 species, marine
- Gippslandia Bayly & Arnott, 1969 — 1 species, marine
- Gladioferens Henry, 1919 — 6 species, marine
- Guernella Giesbrecht in G & Schmeil, 1898 — 1 species, marine
- Hemiboeckella G. O. Sars, 1912 — 3 species, freshwater
- Isias Boeck, 1865 — 4 species, marine
- Limnocalanus G. O. Sars, 1863 — 2 species, marine / brackish water
- Neoboeckella Bayly, 1992 — 2 species, marine
- Osphranticum Forbes, 1882 — 2 species, marine
- Parabroteas Mrázek, 1901 — 1 species, marine
- Sinocalanus Burckhardt, 1913 — 7 species, marine / brackish water
