= List of Telemidae species =

This page lists all described species of the spider family Telemidae accepted by the World Spider Catalog as of February 2021:

== A ==
=== Apneumonella ===
Apneumonella Fage, 1921

- A. jacobsoni Brignoli, 1977 — Malaysia, Indonesia (Sumatra)
- A. oculata Fage, 1921 (type) — Tanzania
- A. taitatavetaensis Zhao & Li, 2017 — Kenya

== C ==
=== Cangoderces ===
Cangoderces Harington, 1951

- C. cameroonensis Baert, 1985 — Cameroon
- C. christae Wang & Li, 2011 — Ivory Coast
- C. globosa Wang, Li & Haddad, 2018 — South Africa
- C. koupeensis Baert, 1985 — Cameroon
- C. lewisi Harington, 1951 (type) — South Africa
- C. milani Wang & Li, 2011 — Cameroon

== G ==
=== Guhua ===
Guhua Zhao & Li, 2017

- G. kakamegaensis Zhao & Li, 2017 (type) — Kenya

== J ==
=== Jocquella ===
Jocquella Baert, 1980

- J. boisai Baert, 1984 — New Guinea
- J. leopoldi Baert, 1980 (type) — New Guinea

== K ==
=== Kinku ===
Kinku Dupérré & Tapia, 2015

- K. turumanya Dupérré & Tapia, 2015 (type) — Ecuador

== M ==
=== Mekonglema ===
Mekonglema Zhao & Li, 2020

- M. bailang Zhao & Li, 2020 (type) — China
- M. kaorao Zhao & Li, 2020 — Laos
- M. walayaku Zhao & Li, 2020 — China
- M. xinpingi (Lin & Li, 2008) — China
- M. yan Zhao & Li, 2020 — China

== P ==
=== Pinelema ===
Pinelema Wang & Li, 2012

- P. adunca (Wang & Li, 2010) — China
- P. bailongensis Wang & Li, 2012 (type) — China
- P. bella (Tong & Li, 2008) — China (Hainan)
- P. bifida (Lin & Li, 2010) — China
- P. biyunensis (Wang & Li, 2010) — China
- P. breviseta (Tong & Li, 2008) — China (Hainan)
- P. cheni Zhao & Li, 2018 — China
- P. circularis (Tong & Li, 2008) — China
- P. claviformis (Tong & Li, 2008) — China
- P. conglobare (Lin & Li, 2010) — China
- P. cordata (Wang & Li, 2010) — China
- P. cucphongensis (Lin, Pham & Li, 2009) — Vietnam
- P. cucurbitina (Wang & Li, 2010) — China
- P. cunfengensis Zhao & Li, 2017 — China
- P. curcici Wang & Li, 2016 — China
- P. daguaiwan Zhao & Li, 2020 — China
- P. damtaoensis Zhao & Li, 2018 — Vietnam
- P. dengi (Tong & Li, 2008) — China (Hainan)
- P. dongbei (Wang & Ran, 1998) — China
- P. exiloculata (Lin, Pham & Li, 2009) — Vietnam
- P. feilong (Chen & Zhu, 2009) — China
- P. grandidens (Tong & Li, 2008) — China
- P. huobaensis Wang & Li, 2016 — China
- P. huoyan Zhao & Li, 2018 — China
- P. laensis Zhao & Li, 2018 — Vietnam
- P. liangxi (Zhu & Chen, 2002) — China
- P. lizhuang Zhao & Li, 2018 — China
- P. mikrosphaira (Wang & Li, 2010) — China
- P. nuocnutensis Zhao & Li, 2018 — Vietnam
- P. oculata (Tong & Li, 2008) — China
- P. pacchanensis Zhao & Li, 2018 — Vietnam
- P. pedati (Lin & Li, 2010) — China
- P. podiensis Zhao & Li, 2017 — China
- P. qingfengensis Zhao & Li, 2017 — China
- P. renalis (Wang & Li, 2010) — China
- P. shiba Zhao & Li, 2020 — China
- P. spina (Tong & Li, 2008) — China (Hainan)
- P. spinafemora (Lin & Li, 2010) — China
- P. spirae (Lin & Li, 2010) — China
- P. spirulata Zhao & Li, 2018 — Vietnam
- P. strentarsi (Lin & Li, 2010) — China
- P. tham Zhao & Li, 2020 — Laos
- P. tortutheca (Lin & Li, 2010) — China
- P. vesiculata (Lin & Li, 2010) — China
- P. wangshang Zhao & Li, 2018 — China
- P. wenyang Zhao & Li, 2018 — China
- P. xiezi Zhao & Li, 2018 — Vietnam
- P. xiushuiensis Wang & Li, 2016 — China
- P. yaosaensis Wang & Li, 2016 — China
- P. yashanensis (Wang & Li, 2010) — China
- P. yunchuni Zhao & Li, 2018 — China
- P. zhenzhuang Zhao & Li, 2018 — Vietnam
- P. zhewang (Chen & Zhu, 2009) — China
- P. zonaria (Wang & Li, 2010) — China

== S ==
=== Seychellia ===
Seychellia Saaristo, 1978

- S. cameroonensis Baert, 1985 — Cameroon
- S. jeremyi Wang & Li, 2011 — Ivory Coast
- S. lodoiceae Brignoli, 1980 — Seychelles
- S. wiljoi Saaristo, 1978 (type) — Seychelles

=== Siamlema ===
Siamlema Zhao & Li, 2020

- S. changhai Zhao & Li, 2020 (type) — Thailand
- S. suea Zhao & Li, 2020 — Thailand

=== Sundalema ===
Sundalema Zhao & Li, 2020

- S. acicularis (Wang & Li, 2010) — Thailand
- S. anguina (Wang & Li, 2010) — Thailand
- S. bonjol Zhao & Li, 2020 (type) — Indonesia (Sumatra)
- S. khaorakkiat Zhao & Li, 2020 — Thailand

== T ==
=== Telema ===
Telema

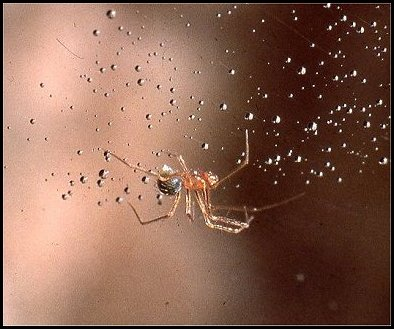
Telema tenella

Telema Simon, 1882

- T. auricoma Lin & Li, 2010 — China
- T. guihua Lin & Li, 2010 — China
- T. mayana Gertsch, 1973 — Guatemala
- T. nipponica (Yaginuma, 1972) — Japan
- T. tenella Simon, 1882 (type) — Spain, France
- T. wunderlichi Song & Zhu, 1994 — China
- † T. moritzi Wunderlich, 2004

=== Telemofila ===
Telemofila Wunderlich, 1995

- T. fabata (Wang & Li, 2010) — Singapore
- T. malaysiaensis (Wang & Li, 2010) — Malaysia (Borneo)
- T. pecki (Brignoli, 1980) — New Caledonia
- T. samosirensis Wunderlich, 1995 (type) — Indonesia (Sumatra)
- † T. crassifemoralis Wunderlich, 2017

== U ==
=== Usofila ===
Usofila Keyserling, 1891

- U. flava Chamberlin & Ivie, 1942 — USA
- U. gracilis Keyserling, 1891 (type) — USA
- U. oregona Chamberlin & Ivie, 1942 — USA
- U. pacifica (Banks, 1894) — USA

== Z ==
=== Zhuanlema ===
Zhuanlema Zhao & Li, 2020

- Z. peteri Zhao & Li, 2020 (type) — Laos
