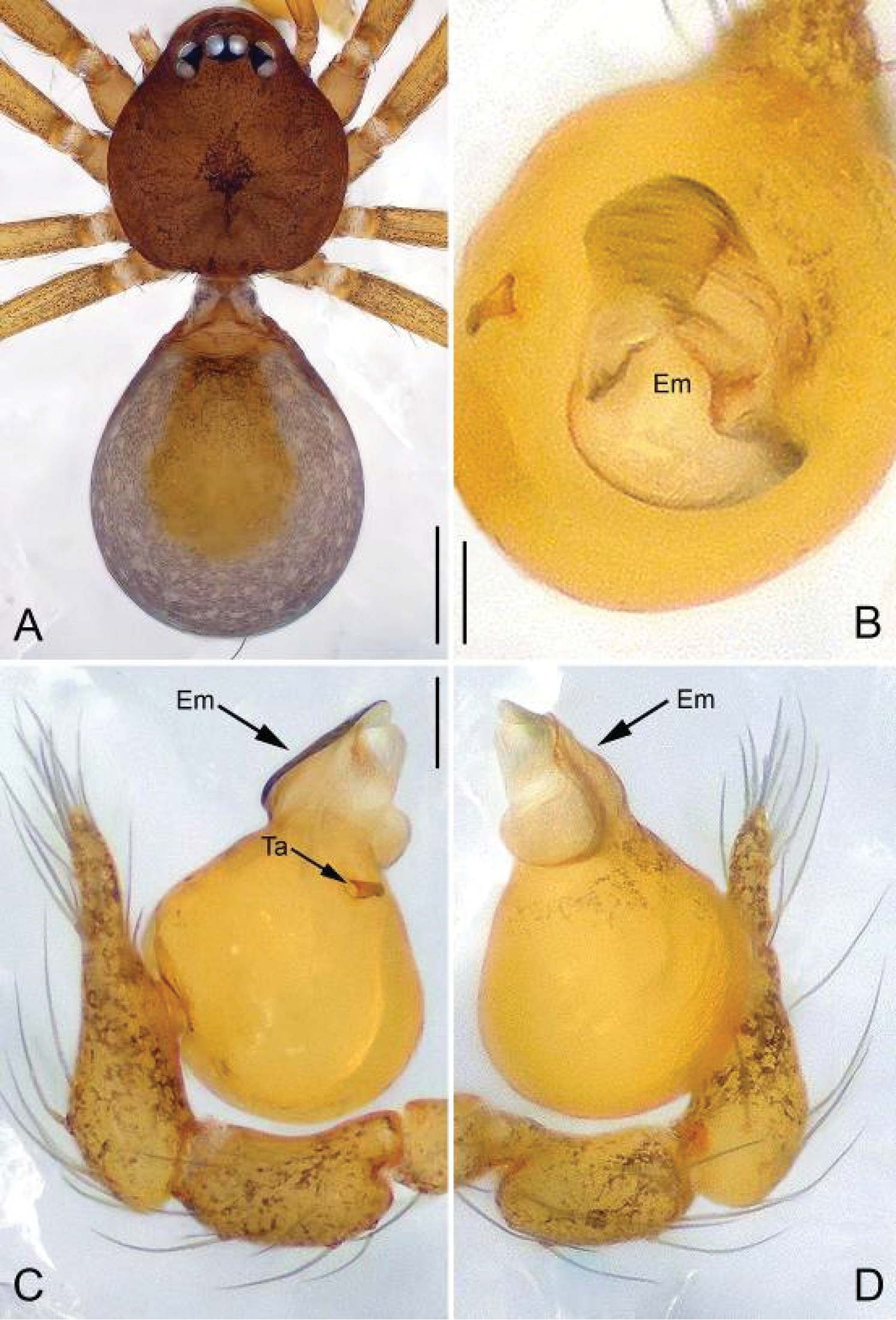
- Apneumonella taitatavetaensis

Scientific classification
- Kingdom: Animalia
- Phylum: Arthropoda
- Subphylum: Chelicerata
- Class: Arachnida
- Order: Araneae
- Infraorder: Araneomorphae
- Family: Telemidae
- Genus: Apneumonella; Fage, 1921

Type species
- Apneumonella oculata Fage, 1921

Species
- A. jacobsoni Brignoli, 1977 – Indonesia (Sumatra), Malaysia; A. oculata Fage, 1921 – Tanzania; A. taitatavetaensis Zhao & Li, 2017 – Kenya

= Apneumonella =

Genus of spiders

Apneumonella is a genus of long-legged cave spiders that was first described by L. Fage in 1921. It is one of several genera, including Telema, Usofila, and Cangoderces, whose relationship within the family and to these other genera is still poorly understood.

== Species ==
As of September 2019 it contains three species, found in Kenya, Tanzania, Malaysia, and Indonesia: A. jacobsoni, A. oculata, and A. taitatavetaensis.

=== Apneumonella jacobsoni ===
Apneumonella jacobsoni has been found in Sumatra and Malaysia. It is the first of the family Telemidae to be found in tropical Asia. This species is similar in appearance to those of the family Ochyroceratidae, but several features, including the simple chelicerae, colulus, and the respiratory system consisting of tracheae with four separated stigmata, show that it belongs in the family Telemidae. The first specimen was found in Malaysia, and though the morphology of the genitalia could have earned it a new genus, because the specimen was female, it was instead provisionally placed in existing genus Apneumonella, though it could also have fit in Cangoderces.

Apneumonella jacobsoni is only known from a single female specimen. Whether or not it belongs in this genus is impossible to say without a described male, and some claim that it would fit better in Cangoderces.

=== Apneumonella oculata ===
The first described species of the genus was represented by an adult female found in a cave in Tanzania. Instead of being completely adapted to cave life like many species of Telema, A. oculata still retains characteristics of life outside caves, including retaining its eyes, at least partial skin pigmentation, and relatively short legs. The abdomen is white, though parts of the carapace, mouth, colulus, and some other parts are red to brown. The carapace is slightly longer than wide, truncated in the rear, and convex toward the middle, slowly sloping in the thoracic part. There are six eyes in total. This species was placed among the Leptonetidae in the subfamily Teleminae, as but the relative proportions of the legs doesn't quite fit. The formula I <II <IV <III is specific to Telema tenella, but does not apply to this species. This may mean that Telema and Apneumonella belong in a separate group from that of Leptonetidae.
