= Apneumonella jacobsoni =

Scientific classification
- Domain: Eukaryota
- Kingdom: Animalia
- Phylum: Arthropoda
- Subphylum: Chelicerata
- Class: Arachnida
- Order: Araneae
- Infraorder: Araneomorphae
- Family: Telemidae
- Genus: Apneumonella
- Species: A. jacobsoni

Binomial name
- Apneumonella jacobsoni Brignoli, 1977

Species of spider

Apneumonella jacobsoni is a species of spider in the family Telemidae first described by Paulo Marcello Brignoli in 1977. It is found in Malaysia and Sumatra, and is the first of the family Telemidae to be found in tropical Asia.

== Taxonomy ==
The specific epithet honours Edward Richard Jacobson, who collected the type material used to describe A. jacobsoni. A. jacobsoni is only known from female specimens, therefore whether or not it belongs in this genus is impossible to say without a described male, and some claim that it would fit better in Cangoderces. The first specimen was found in Malaysia, and though the morphology of the genitalia could have earned it a new genus, because the specimen was female, it was instead provisionally placed in the existing genus Apneumonella.

== Description ==
This species is similar in appearance to those of the family Ochyroceratidae, particularly Speocera, but several features, including the simple chelicerae, colulus, and the respiratory system consisting of tracheae with four separated stigmata, show that it belongs in the family Telemidae.

Females measure 0.9 millimetres (0.035 in) in body length. The legs are yellow and spineless, with a leg formula of III < II < IV < I. They are six-eyed and have a yellow cephalothorax with a darkened star-shaped dot in the centre; and an oval, whitish abdomen.
