= Milema =

Scientific classification
- Kingdom: Animalia
- Phylum: Arthropoda
- Subphylum: Chelicerata
- Class: Arachnida
- Order: Araneae
- Infraorder: Araneomorphae
- Family: Telemidae
- Genus: Milema; Zhao & Li, 2022

Type species
- M. nuichua Zhao & Li, 2022

Species
- 3, see text

Genus of spiders

Milema is a genus of spiders in the family Telemidae.

== Distribution ==
Milema is known from Southeast Asia, with species recorded in Thailand and Vietnam.

== Etymology ==
The genus name is a combination of millet (referring to the small size) and related genus Telema.

M. lorkor is named after Lor Kor Cave (Rattalung, Khao Chaison District), the type locality. M. nuichua was found in Nui Chua National Park, Ninh Thuan, Vietnam; M. sai in Sai Cave, Ban Pu, San Rai Yot District, Prachuap Khiri Khan, Thailand.

== Species ==
As of January 2026, this genus includes three species:

- Milema lorkor Zhao & Li, 2022 – Thailand
- Milema nuichua Zhao & Li, 2022 – Vietnam
- Milema sai Zhao & Li, 2022 – Thailand
