= Burmalema =

Scientific classification
- Kingdom: Animalia
- Phylum: Arthropoda
- Subphylum: Chelicerata
- Class: Arachnida
- Order: Araneae
- Infraorder: Araneomorphae
- Family: Telemidae
- Genus: Burmalema; Zhao & Li, 2022
- Species: B. shan

Binomial name
- Burmalema shan Zhao & Li, 2022

Species of spider

Burmalema is a monotypic genus of spiders in the family Telemidae containing the single species, Burmalema shan. Burmalema shan has only been recorded from an unnamed cave in Taunggyi County, Shan State, Myanmar.

The genus name is a combination of Burma and the ending of related genus Telema. The species is named after the type locality.
