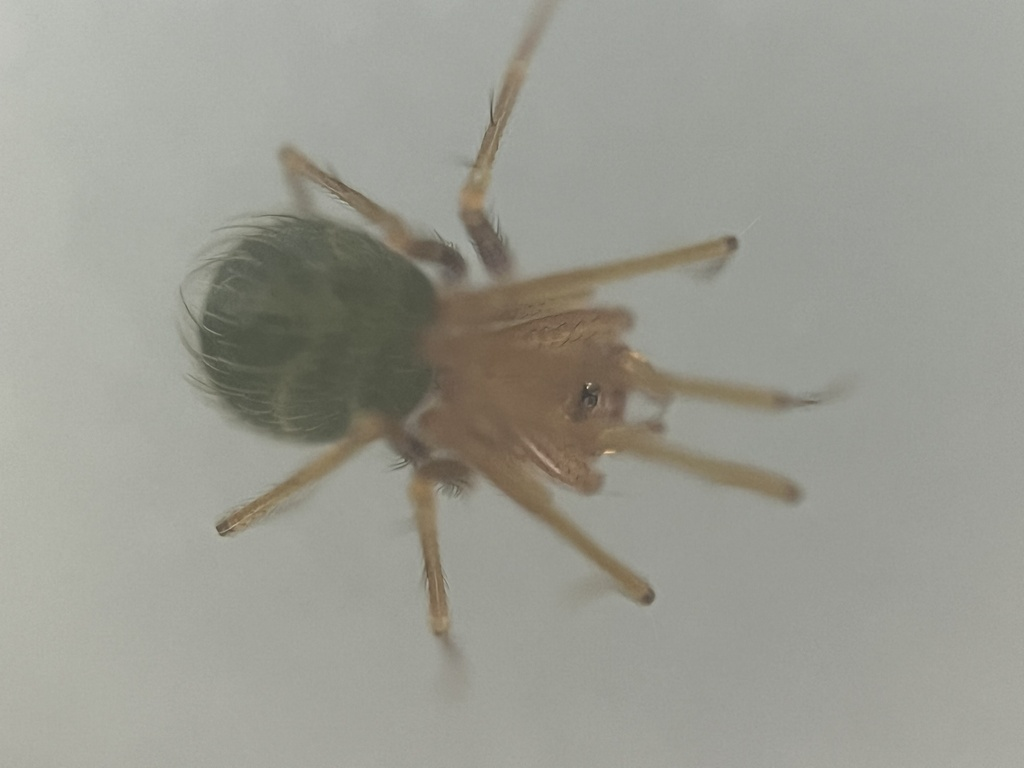

Scientific classification
- Kingdom: Animalia
- Phylum: Arthropoda
- Subphylum: Chelicerata
- Class: Arachnida
- Order: Araneae
- Infraorder: Araneomorphae
- Family: Telemidae
- Genus: Usofila
- Species: U. pacifica

Binomial name
- Usofila pacifica (Banks, 1894)

= Usofila pacifica =

Species of spider

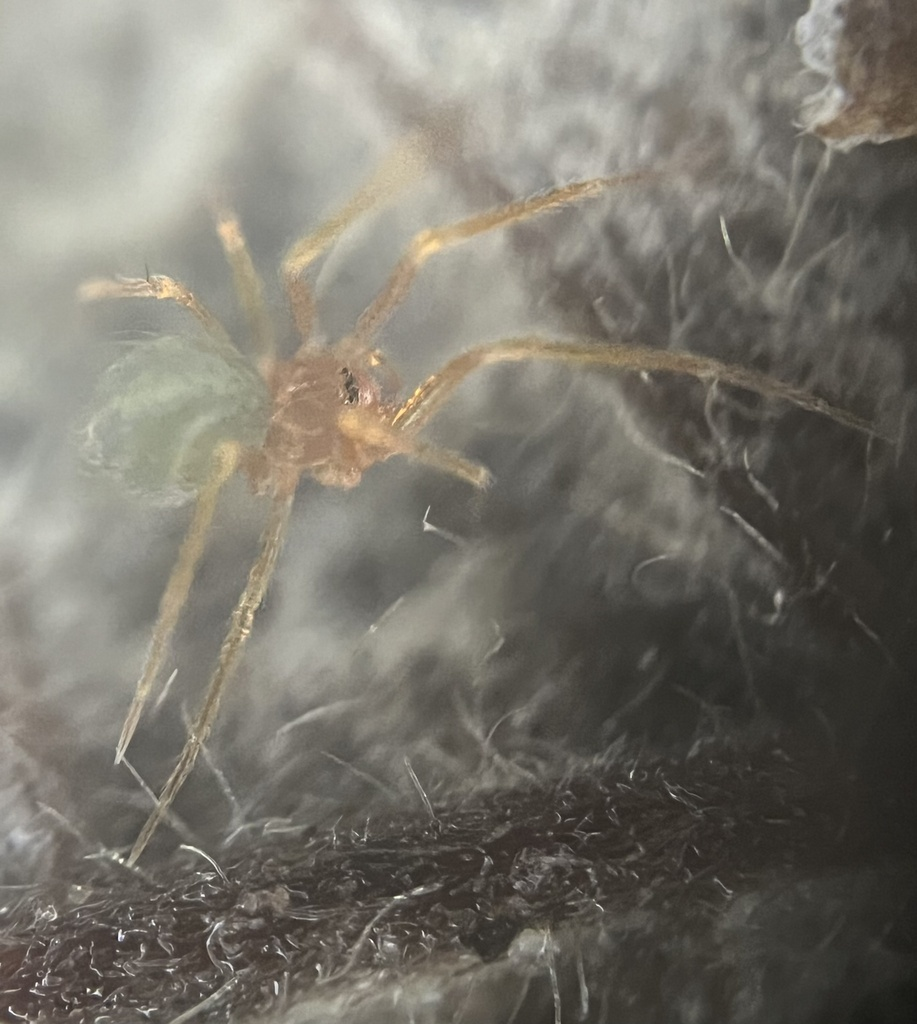
a Usofila pacifica found in Washington State, walking on a dead leaf.

Usofila pacifica is a species of true spider in the family Telemidae. It is found in the west coast of the United States and Canada.

== Habitat ==
This species is commonly found under dead leaflitter, or in a very minute and fine web of spider silk.

== Appearance ==
The overall coloration of this spider is dark green to reddish, with a light green stripe down the middle joined by two other, wavy light green stripes. the spider has fine hairs, that get larger the further back you go onto the spider. there are two large hairs that stick out at the very back of the spider that characterize it.
