= Seychellia lodoiceae =

Conservation status
- Critically Endangered (IUCN 3.1)

Scientific classification
- Kingdom: Animalia
- Phylum: Arthropoda
- Subphylum: Chelicerata
- Class: Arachnida
- Order: Araneae
- Infraorder: Araneomorphae
- Family: Telemidae
- Genus: Seychellia
- Species: S. lodoiceae

Binomial name
- Seychellia lodoiceae (Brignoli, 1980)

Species of spider

Seychellia lodoiceae is a species of spider in the family Telemidae. The species is endemic to Vallée de Mai Nature Reserve on Praslin Island in the Seychelles.
