= Sundalema =

Scientific classification
- Kingdom: Animalia
- Phylum: Arthropoda
- Subphylum: Chelicerata
- Class: Arachnida
- Order: Araneae
- Infraorder: Araneomorphae
- Family: Telemidae
- Genus: Sundalema; Zhao & Li, 2020

Type species
- S. bonjol Zhao & Li, 2020

Species
- 4, see text

Genus of spiders

Sundalema is a genus of southeast Asian long-legged cave spiders first described by H. F. Zhao, S. Q. Li and A. B. Zhang in 2020.

== Species ==
As of April 2022 it contains four species:

- S. acicularis (Wang & Li, 2010) – Thailand
- S. anguina (Wang & Li, 2010) – Thailand
- S. bonjol Zhao & Li, 2020 (type) – Indonesia (Sumatra)
- S. khaorakkiat Zhao & Li, 2020 – Thailand

== See also ==
- Telema
