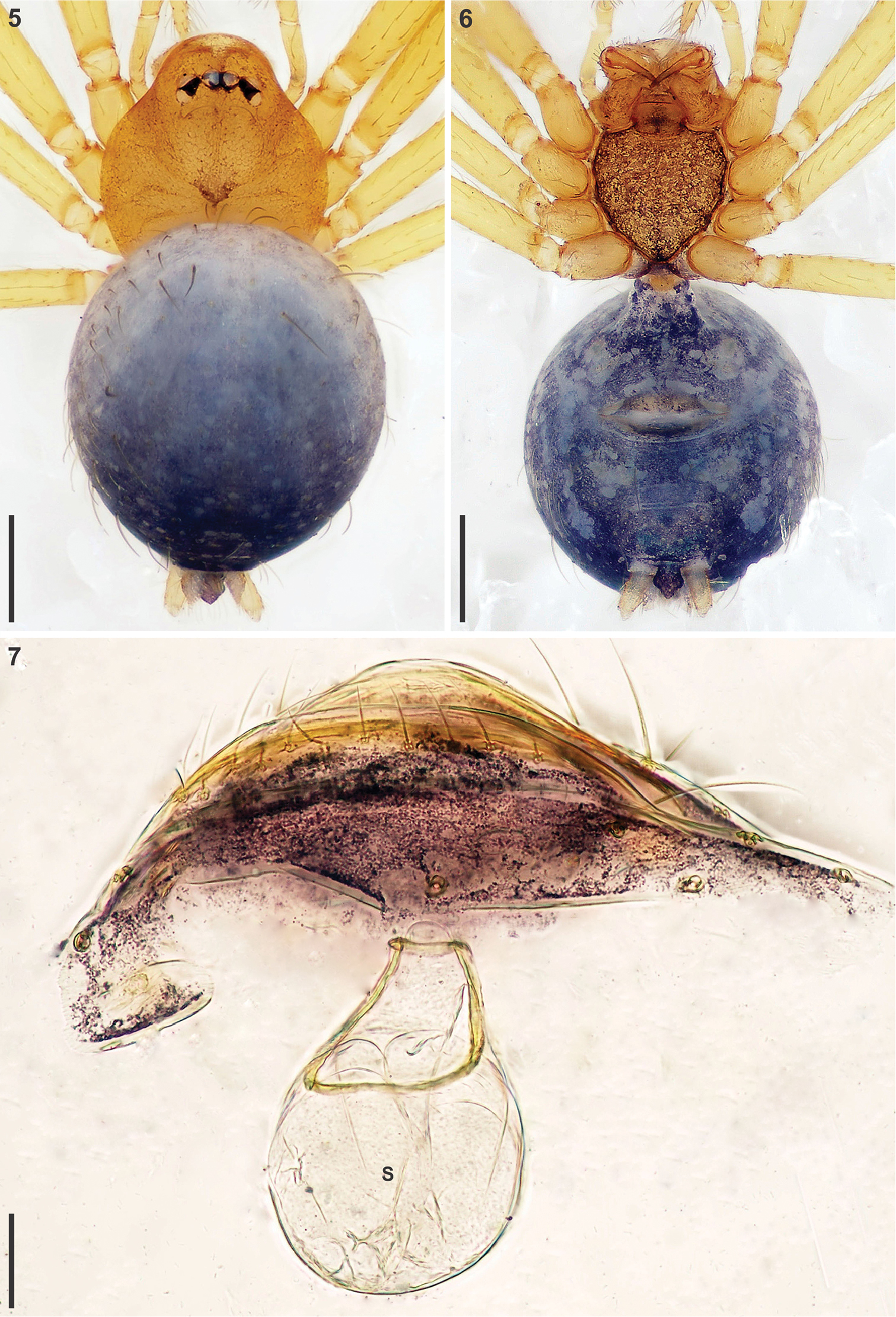
- Cangoderces globosa sp. n., female holotype. 5 habitus, dorsal view 6 habitus, ventral view 7 genitalia, dorsal view. Abbreviation: S – spermatheca

Scientific classification
- Kingdom: Animalia
- Phylum: Arthropoda
- Subphylum: Chelicerata
- Class: Arachnida
- Order: Araneae
- Infraorder: Araneomorphae
- Family: Telemidae
- Genus: Cangoderces
- Species: C. globosus

Binomial name
- Cangoderces globosus Wang, Li & Haddad, 2018

= Cangoderces globosus =

Species of spider

Cangoderces globosus is a species of spider in the family Telemidae. It is endemic to South Africa.

== Distribution ==
Cangoderces globosus is known only from Mpumalanga.

== Habitat and ecology ==
The species is found in Afromontane forest at an altitude of 1,556 m above sea level. It has been sampled while sifting leaf litter.

== Conservation ==
Cangoderces globosus is listed as data deficient due to the species' status remaining obscure. The species is known only from the type locality and more sampling is needed to determine the species range.

== Taxonomy ==
The species was described by Wang, Li & Haddad in 2018 from the type locality Sabie in Mpumalanga. It is known from both sexes.
