= Cangoderces lewisi =

Cango Cave Spider

Scientific classification
- Kingdom: Animalia
- Phylum: Arthropoda
- Subphylum: Chelicerata
- Class: Arachnida
- Order: Araneae
- Infraorder: Araneomorphae
- Family: Telemidae
- Genus: Cangoderces
- Species: C. lewisi

Binomial name
- Cangoderces lewisi Harington, 1951

Species of spider

Cangoderces lewisi is a species of spider in the family Telemidae. It is endemic to South Africa and is commonly known as the Cango cave spider.

== Distribution ==
Cangoderces lewisi is known only from the Western Cape, at Cango Caves, Oudtshoorn.

== Habitat and ecology ==
The species inhabits caves at an altitude of 357 m above sea level. Cangoderces lewisi was collected from the Cango Caves about 700 m from the entrance, where individuals were found in space webs spun in small crevices in the rock wall about 30-40 cm above the footpath in the total dark zone of the cave.

== Conservation ==
Cangoderces lewisi is listed as critically rare due to having a small restricted distribution range and being recorded from only one locality. The status of the species remains obscure and more sampling is needed to determine the species range. The species is endangered because of commercial activities in the cave.

== Taxonomy ==
Cangoderces lewisi is the type species of the genus Cangoderces. The species was originally described by Harington in 1951 based on seven females collected in the Cango Caves. The male was first described by Brignoli in 1978. The species has not been revised and is known from both sexes.
