= Mekonglema =

Scientific classification
- Kingdom: Animalia
- Phylum: Arthropoda
- Subphylum: Chelicerata
- Class: Arachnida
- Order: Araneae
- Infraorder: Araneomorphae
- Family: Telemidae
- Genus: Mekonglema; Zhao & Li, 2020

Type species
- M. bailang Zhao & Li, 2020

Species
- 5, see text

Genus of spiders

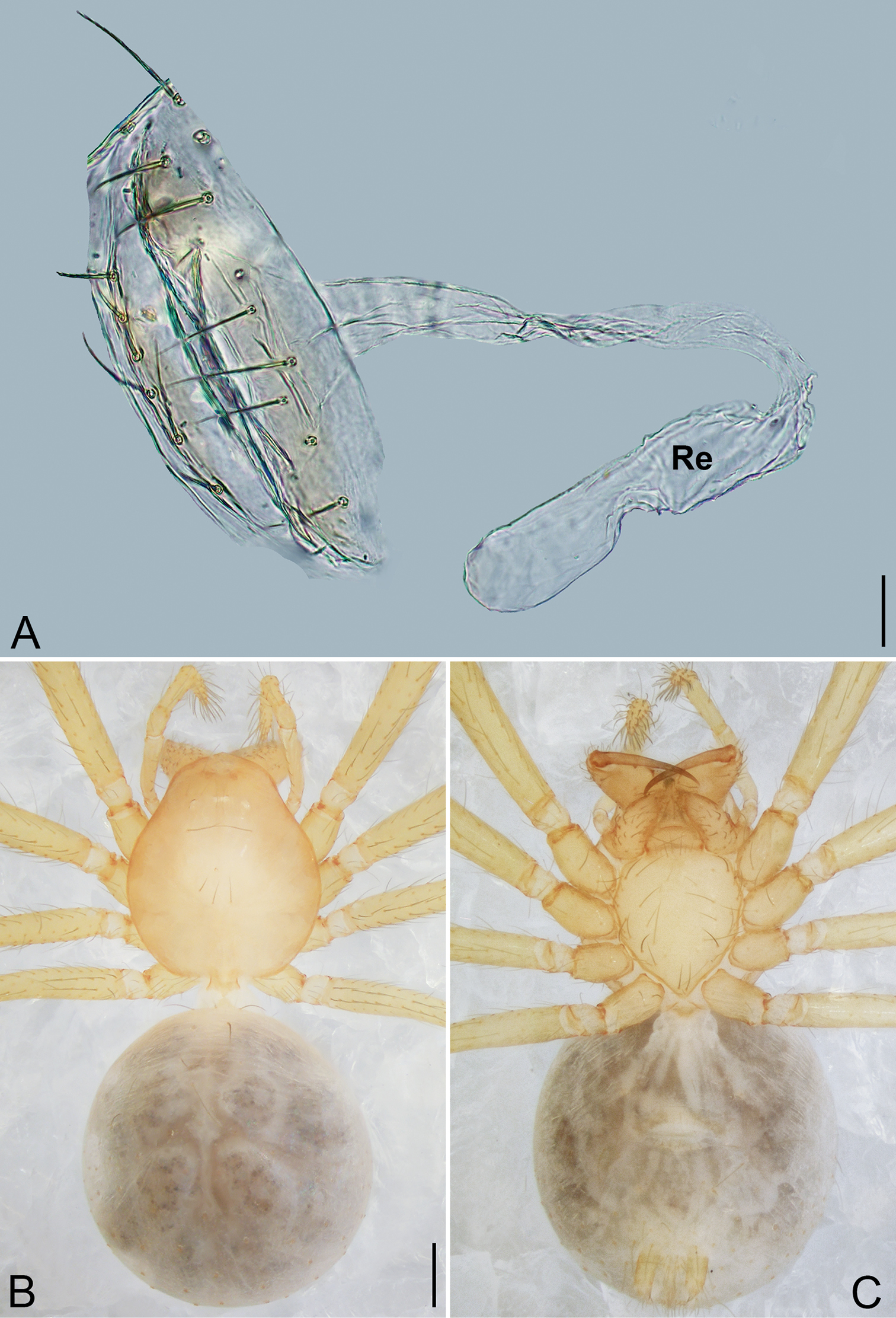
Mekonglema yan

Mekonglema is a genus of Asian long-legged cave spiders first described by H. F. Zhao, S. Q. Li and A. B. Zhang in 2020.

== Species ==
As of April 2022 it contains five species:

- M. bailang Zhao & Li, 2020 (type) – China
- M. kaorao Zhao & Li, 2020 – Laos
- M. walayaku Zhao & Li, 2020 – China
- M. xinpingi (Lin & Li, 2008) – China
- M. yan Zhao & Li, 2020 – China

== See also ==
- Seychellia
