= Kinku =

Scientific classification
- Domain: Eukaryota
- Kingdom: Animalia
- Phylum: Arthropoda
- Subphylum: Chelicerata
- Class: Arachnida
- Order: Araneae
- Infraorder: Araneomorphae
- Family: Telemidae
- Genus: Kinku; Tapia

Species
- Kinku turumanya Dupérré & Tapia, 2015

Genus of spiders

Kinku is a genus of spiders in the Telemidae family. It was first described in 2015 by Dupérré & Tapia. As of 2016, it contains only one species, Kinku turumanya, found in Ecuador.
