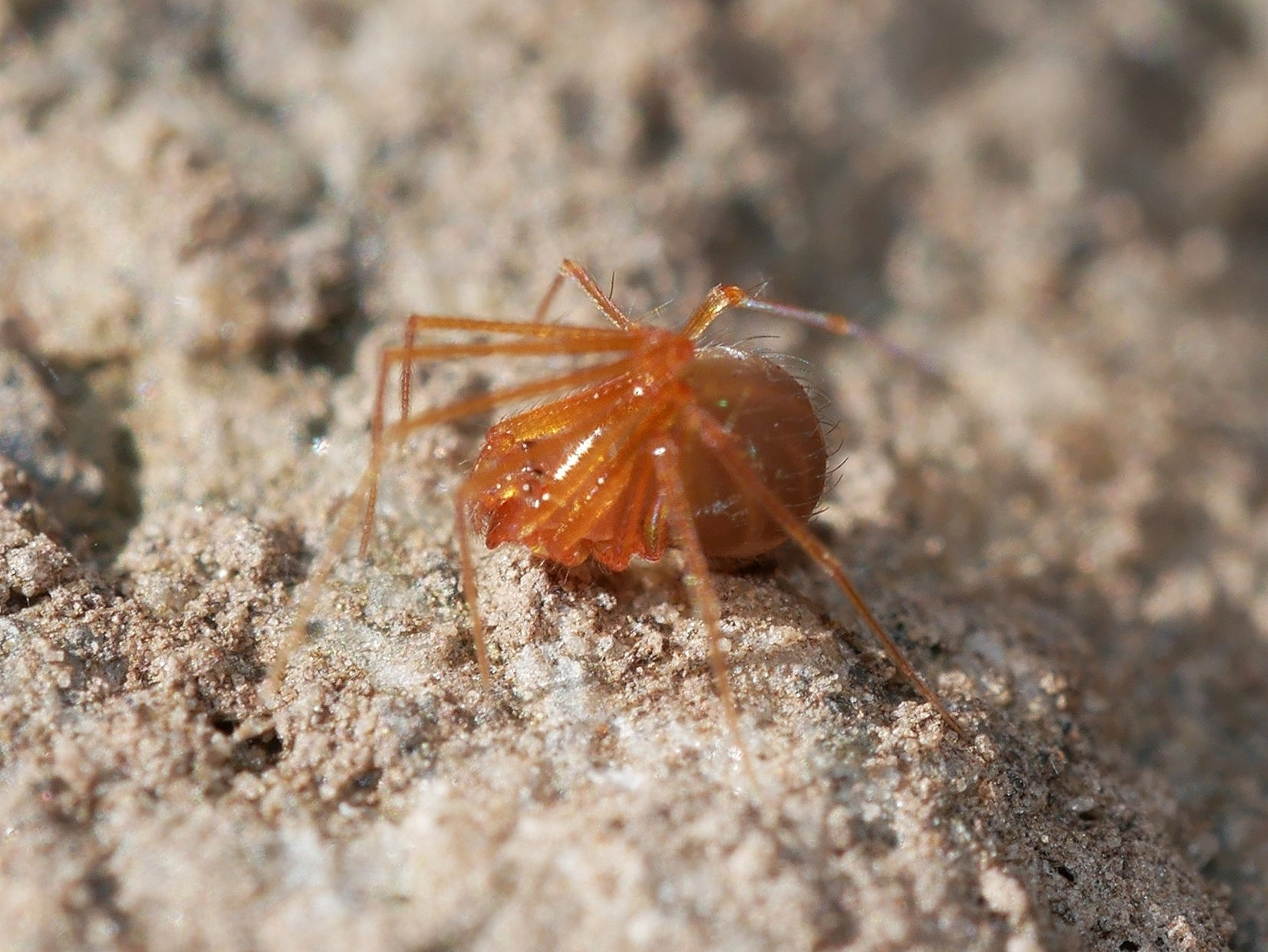
- female U. flava
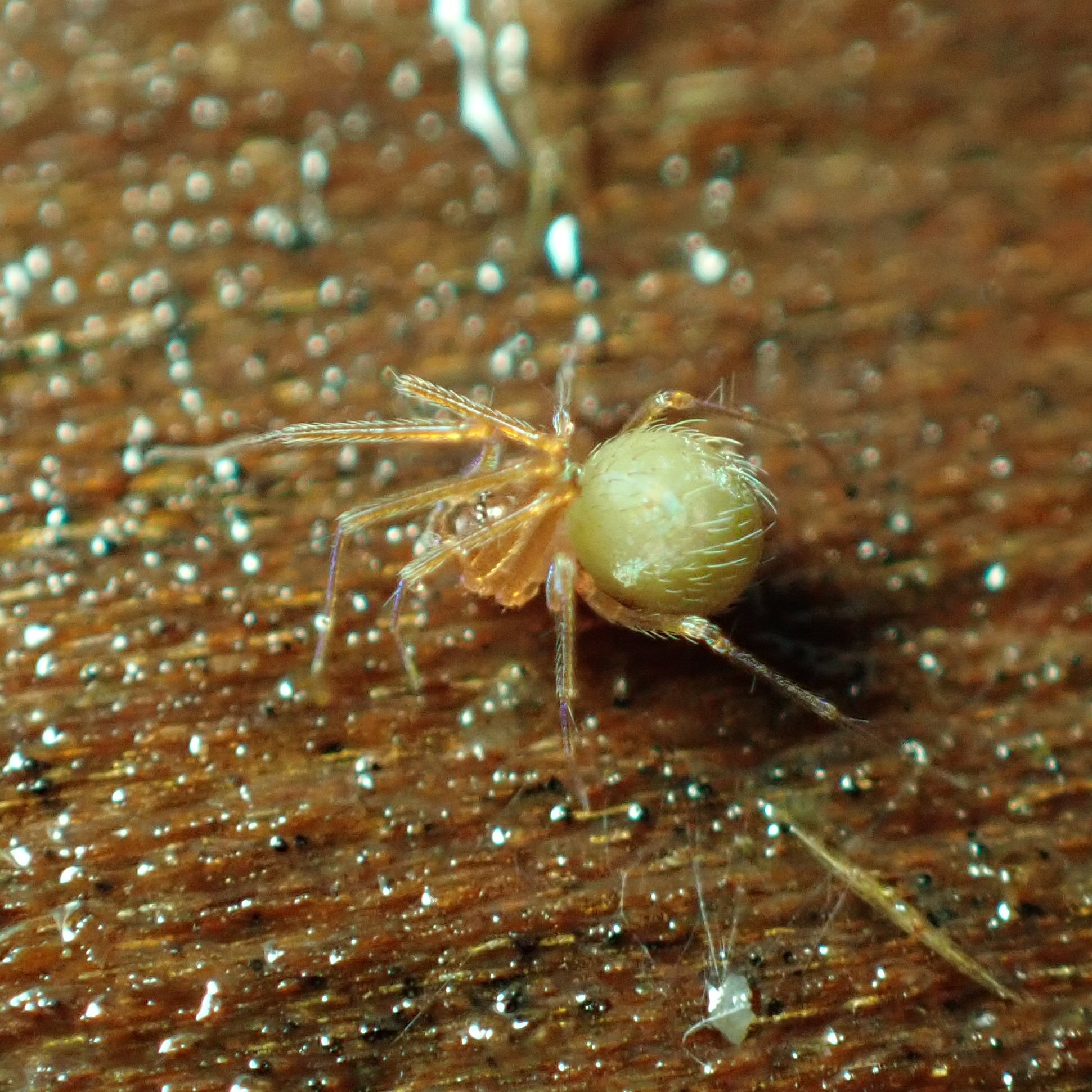
- U. pacifica

Scientific classification
- Kingdom: Animalia
- Phylum: Arthropoda
- Subphylum: Chelicerata
- Class: Arachnida
- Order: Araneae
- Infraorder: Araneomorphae
- Family: Telemidae
- Genus: Usofila; Keyserling, 1891

Type species
- U. gracilis Keyserling, 1891

Species
- 4, see text

= Usofila =

Genus of spiders

Usofila is a genus of American long-legged cave spiders that was first described by Eugen von Keyserling in 1891. Originally placed with the Ochyroceratidae, it was transferred to the Telemidae in 1973.

All species are found in the United States, with U. pacifica extending to Canada and Alaska.

== Species ==
As of October 2025, this genus includes four species:

- Usofila flava Chamberlin & Ivie, 1942 – United States
- Usofila gracilis Keyserling, 1891 – United States (type species)
- Usofila oregona Chamberlin & Ivie, 1942 – United States
- Usofila pacifica (Banks, 1894) – Alaska, Canada, United States

Formerly included

- Usofila pecki Brignoli, 1980 = Telemofila pecki

== See also ==
- Telema
