= Jocquella =

Scientific classification
- Kingdom: Animalia
- Phylum: Arthropoda
- Subphylum: Chelicerata
- Class: Arachnida
- Order: Araneae
- Infraorder: Araneomorphae
- Family: Telemidae
- Genus: Jocquella; Baert, 1980

Type species
- J. leopoldi Baert, 1980

Species
- J. boisai Baert, 1984 – New Guinea; J. leopoldi Baert, 1980 – New Guinea

Genus of spiders

Jocquella is a genus of Papuan long-legged cave spiders that was first described by L. Baert in 1980. As of September 2019 it contains two species, found in Papua New Guinea: J. boisai and J. leopoldi.
