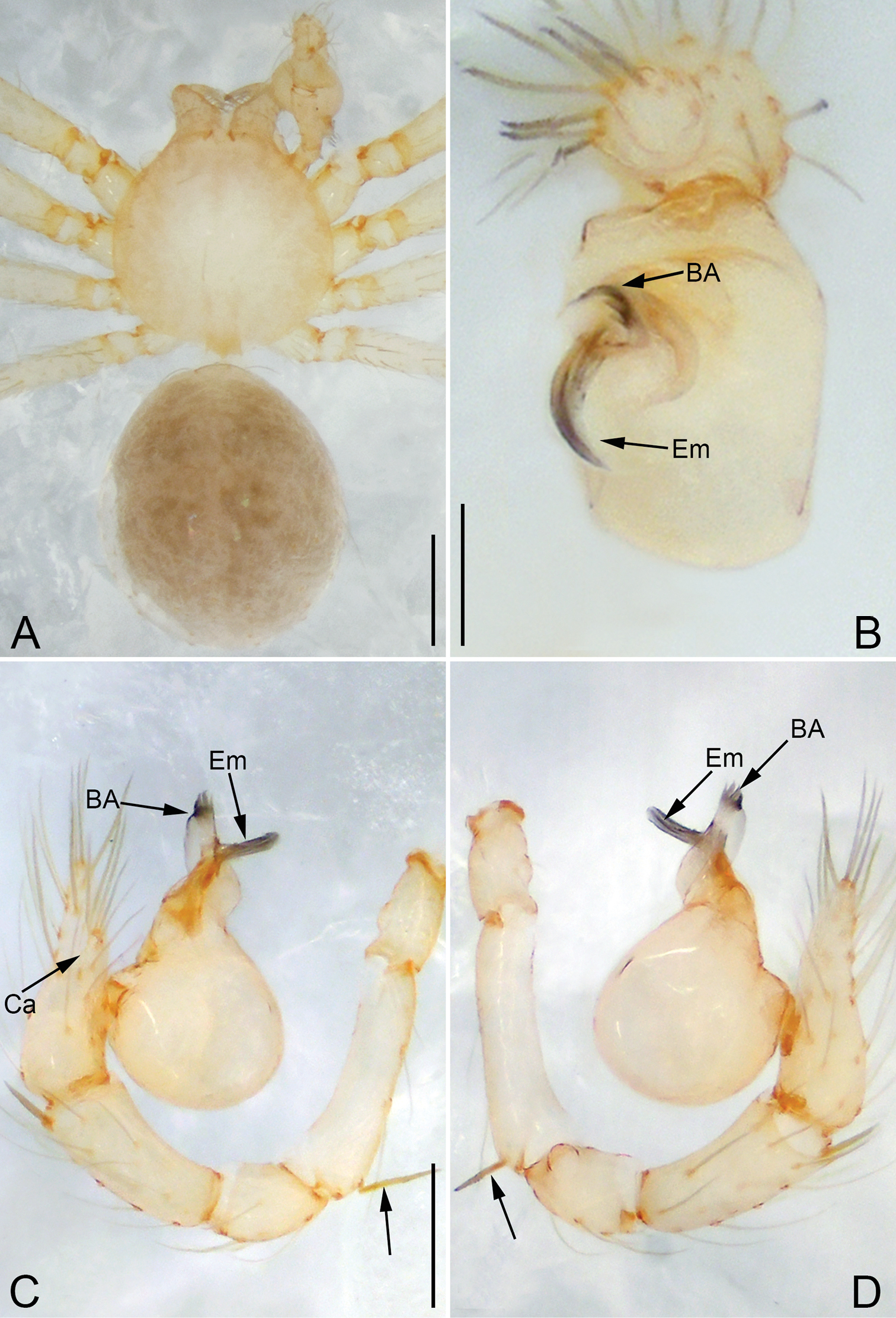
- Siamlema changhai specimine

Scientific classification
- Kingdom: Animalia
- Phylum: Arthropoda
- Subphylum: Chelicerata
- Class: Arachnida
- Order: Araneae
- Infraorder: Araneomorphae
- Family: Telemidae
- Genus: Siamlema; Zhao & Li, 2020

Type species
- S. changhai Zhao & Li, 2020

Species
- Siamlema changhai Zhao & Li, 2020; Siamlema suea Zhao & Li, 2020

= Siamlema =

Genus of spiders

Siamlema is a small genus of southeast Asian long-legged cave spiders. It was first described by H. F. Zhao, S. Q. Li and A. B. Zhang in 2020, and it has only been found in Thailand. As of April 2022 it contains only two species: S. changhai and S. suea.
