= Zhuanlema =

Scientific classification
- Kingdom: Animalia
- Phylum: Arthropoda
- Subphylum: Chelicerata
- Class: Arachnida
- Order: Araneae
- Infraorder: Araneomorphae
- Family: Telemidae
- Genus: Zhuanlema; Zhao & Li, 2020
- Species: Z. peteri

Binomial name
- Zhuanlema peteri Zhao & Li, 2020

Genus of spiders

Zhuanlema is a monotypic genus of southeast Asian long-legged cave spiders containing the single species, Zhuanlema peteri. It was first described by H. F. Zhao, S. Q. Li and A. B. Zhang in 2020, and it has only been found in Laos.
