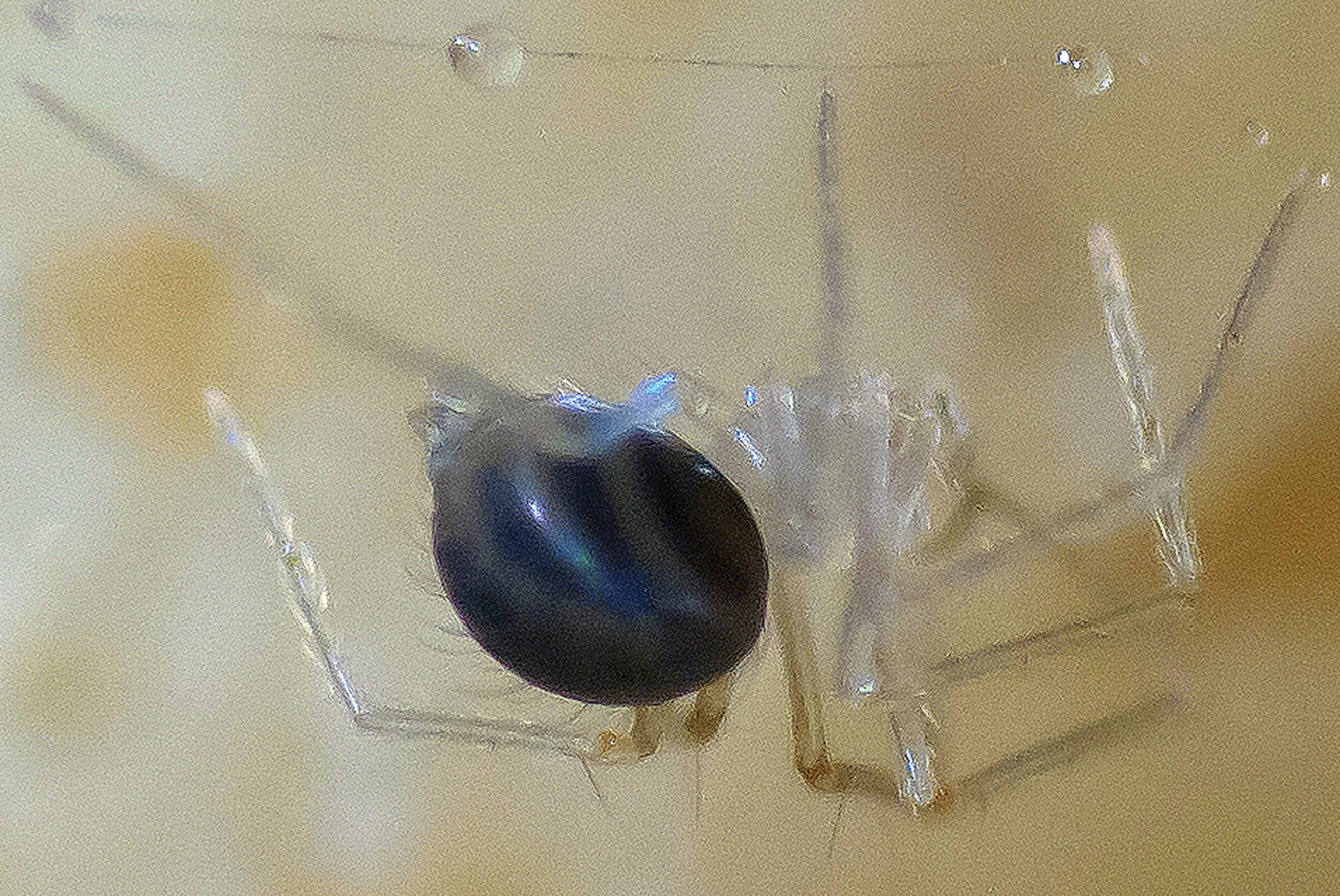
- Telema tenella

Scientific classification
- Kingdom: Animalia
- Phylum: Arthropoda
- Subphylum: Chelicerata
- Class: Arachnida
- Order: Araneae
- Infraorder: Araneomorphae
- Family: Telemidae
- Genus: Telema
- Species: T. tenella

Binomial name
- Telema tenella Simon, 1882

= Telema tenella =

Species of spider

Telema tenella is a species of spider in the family Telemidae. The species is endemic to the eastern Pyrénées between Spain and France. For the fist time in Spiders, A.Lopez discovered histologically (1976,1977) the use of spermatophora by Telema and Apneumonella

== Description ==
Telema tenella has a length of about 1.5 to 2 mm. Being cave-dwelling, it is eyeless. It is also lungless. This spider can live up to sixteen years old, including twelve years as an adult.

== Distribution ==
Telema tenella is found in the caves of the eastern Pyrénées. In France, it can be found in Pyrénées-Orientales around the Canigou, in Montferrer and La Preste. In Spain, it is found in the province of Girona.
