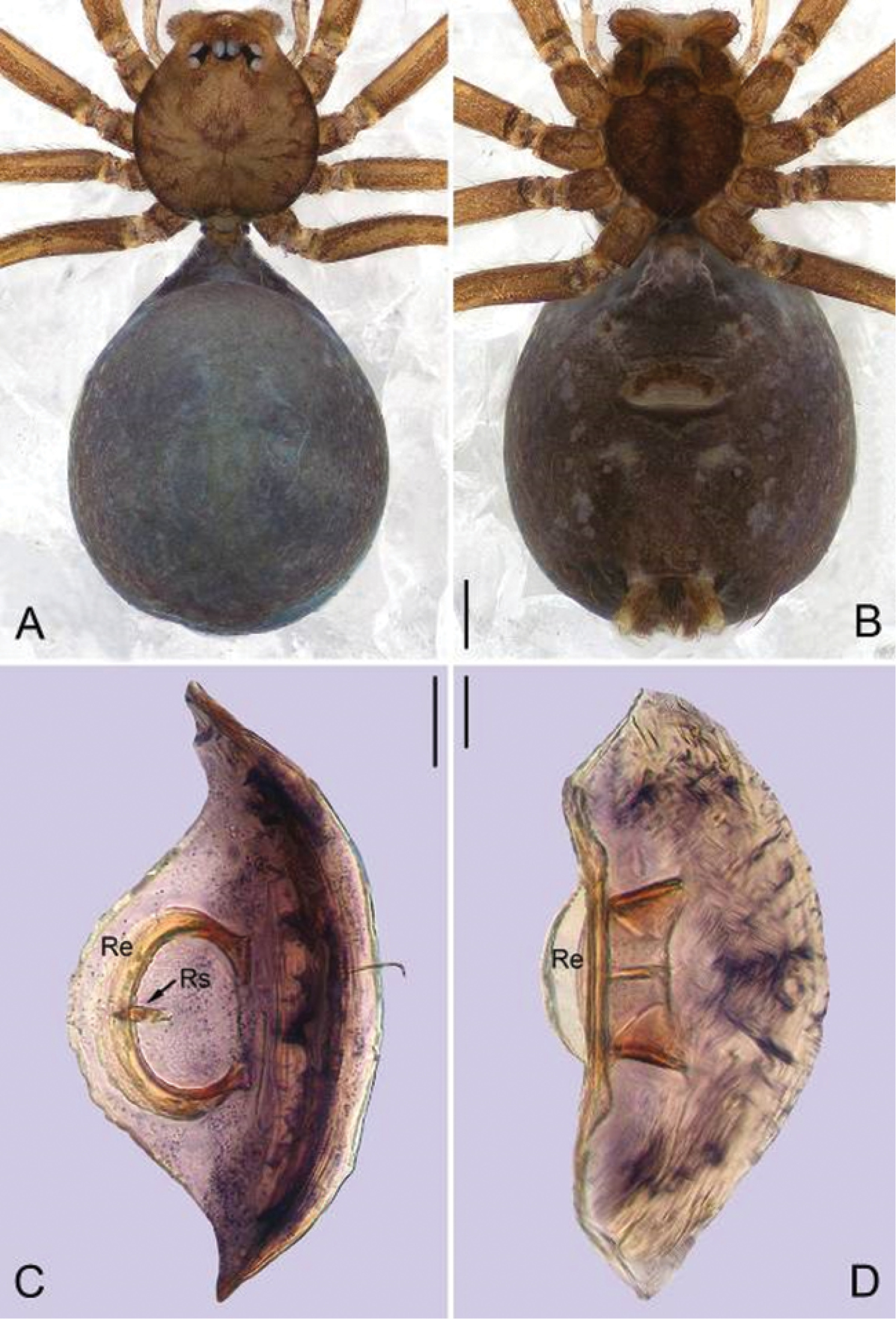

Scientific classification
- Domain: Eukaryota
- Kingdom: Animalia
- Phylum: Arthropoda
- Subphylum: Chelicerata
- Class: Arachnida
- Order: Araneae
- Infraorder: Araneomorphae
- Family: Telemidae
- Genus: Guhua; Zhao & Li, 2017
- Species: G. kakamegaensis

Binomial name
- Guhua kakamegaensis Zhao & Li, 2017

= Guhua =

Genus of spiders

Guhua is a genus of African long-legged cave spiders containing the single species, Guhua kakamegaensis. It was first described by H. F. Zhao & S. Q. Li in 2017, and is only found in Kenya.
