= Seychellia =

Scientific classification
- Kingdom: Animalia
- Phylum: Arthropoda
- Subphylum: Chelicerata
- Class: Arachnida
- Order: Araneae
- Infraorder: Araneomorphae
- Family: Telemidae
- Genus: Seychellia; Saaristo, 1978

Type species
- S. wiljoi Saaristo, 1978

Species
- 5, see text

Genus of spiders

Seychellia is a genus of long-legged cave spiders that was first described by Michael I. Saaristo in 1978.

== Species ==
As of September 2019 it contains five species, found in Africa and China:

- Seychellia cameroonensis Baert, 1985 – Cameroon
- Seychellia jeremyi Wang & Li, 2011 – Ivory Coast
- Seychellia lodoiceae Brignoli, 1980 – Seychelles
- Seychellia wiljoi Saaristo, 1978 (type) – Seychelles
- Seychellia xinpingi Lin & Li, 2008 – China
