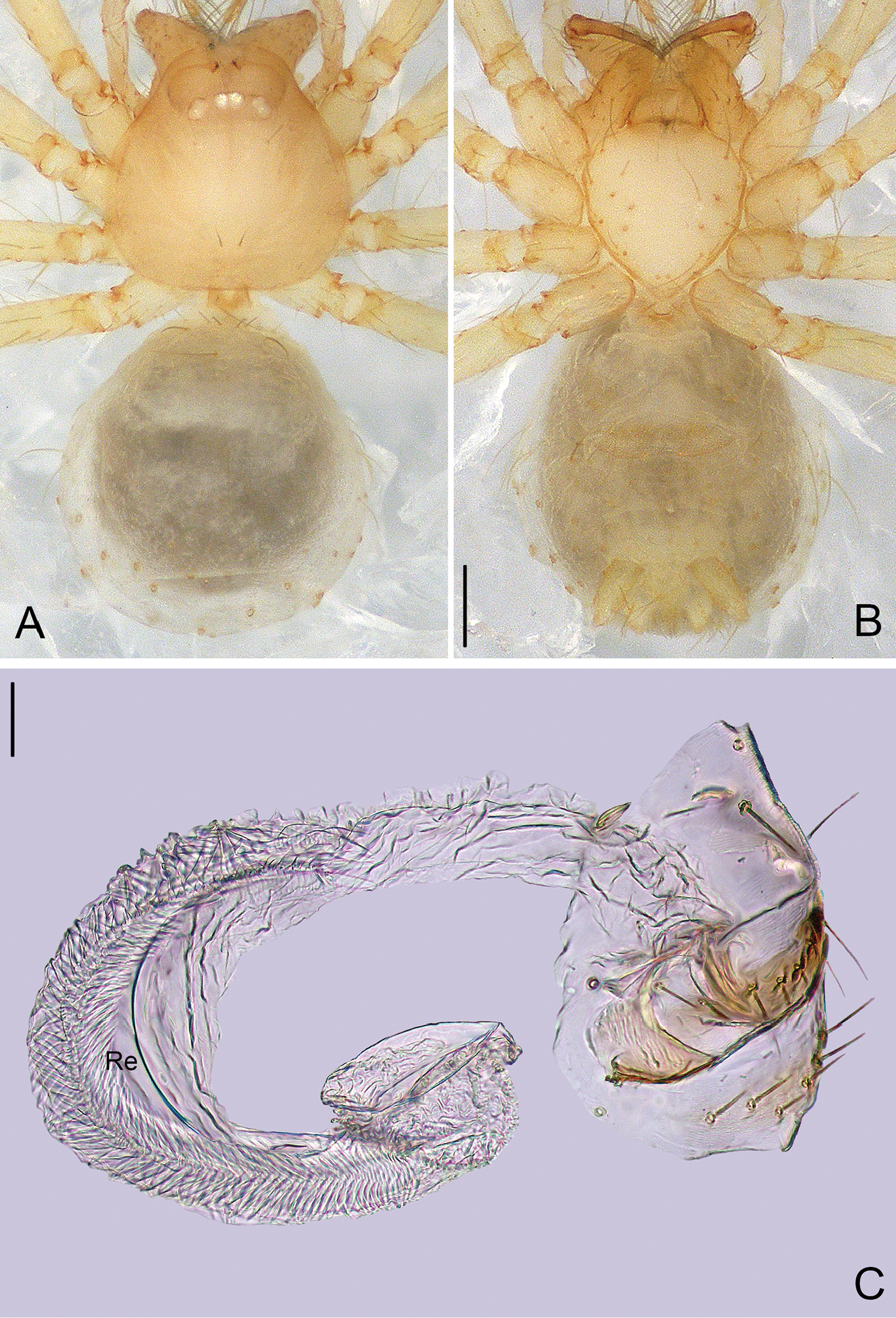
- Pinelema podiensis

Scientific classification
- Kingdom: Animalia
- Phylum: Arthropoda
- Subphylum: Chelicerata
- Class: Arachnida
- Order: Araneae
- Infraorder: Araneomorphae
- Family: Telemidae
- Genus: Pinelema; Wang & Li, 2012

Type species
- P. bailongensis Wang & Li, 2012

Species
- 55, see text

= Pinelema =

Genus of spiders

Pinelema is a genus of Asian long-legged cave spiders that was first described by C. X. Wang & S. Q. Li in 2012.

== Species ==
As of February 2022 it contains fifty-five species, found in China and Vietnam:

- Pinelema adunca (Wang & Li, 2010) — China
- Pinelema bailongensis Wang & Li, 2012 (type) — China
- Pinelema bella (Tong & Li, 2008) — China (Hainan)
- Pinelema bifida (Lin & Li, 2010) — China
- Pinelema biyunensis (Wang & Li, 2010) — China
- Pinelema breviseta (Tong & Li, 2008) — China (Hainan)
- Pinelema cheni Zhao & Li, 2018 — China
- Pinelema circularis (Tong & Li, 2008) — China
- Pinelema claviformis (Tong & Li, 2008) — China
- Pinelema conglobare (Lin & Li, 2010) — China
- Pinelema cordata (Wang & Li, 2010) — China
- Pinelema cucphongensis (Lin, Pham & Li, 2009) — Vietnam
- Pinelema cucurbitina (Wang & Li, 2010) — China
- Pinelema cunfengensis Zhao & Li, 2017 — China
- Pinelema curcici Wang & Li, 2016 — China
- Pinelema daguaiwan Zhao & Li, 2020 — China
- Pinelema damtaoensis Zhao & Li, 2018 — Vietnam
- Pinelema dengi (Tong & Li, 2008) — China (Hainan)
- Pinelema dongbei (Wang & Ran, 1998) — China
- Pinelema exiloculata (Lin, Pham & Li, 2009) — Vietnam
- Pinelema feilong (Chen & Zhu, 2009) — China
- Pinelema grandidens (Tong & Li, 2008) — China
- Pinelema huobaensis Wang & Li, 2016 — China
- Pinelema huoyan Zhao & Li, 2018 — China
- Pinelema laensis Zhao & Li, 2018 — Vietnam
- Pinelema liangxi (Zhu & Chen, 2002) — China
- Pinelema lizhuang Zhao & Li, 2018 — China
- Pinelema mikrosphaira (Wang & Li, 2010) — China
- Pinelema mulunensis Chen & Xu, 2021 — China
- Pinelema nuocnutensis Zhao & Li, 2018 — Vietnam
- Pinelema oculata (Tong & Li, 2008) — China
- Pinelema pacchanensis Zhao & Li, 2018 — Vietnam
- Pinelema pedati (Lin & Li, 2010) — China
- Pinelema podiensis Zhao & Li, 2017 — China
- Pinelema qingfengensis Zhao & Li, 2017 — China
- Pinelema renalis (Wang & Li, 2010) — China
- Pinelema shiba Zhao & Li, 2020 — China
- Pinelema spina (Tong & Li, 2008) — China (Hainan)
- Pinelema spinafemora (Lin & Li, 2010) — China
- Pinelema spirae (Lin & Li, 2010) — China
- Pinelema spirulata Zhao & Li, 2018 — Vietnam
- Pinelema strentarsi (Lin & Li, 2010) — China
- Pinelema tham Zhao & Li, 2020 — Laos
- Pinelema tortutheca (Lin & Li, 2010) — China
- Pinelema vesiculata (Lin & Li, 2010) — China
- Pinelema wangshang Zhao & Li, 2018 — China
- Pinelema wenyang Zhao & Li, 2018 — China
- Pinelema xiezi Zhao & Li, 2018 — Vietnam
- Pinelema xiushuiensis Wang & Li, 2016 — China
- Pinelema yaosaensis Wang & Li, 2016 — China
- Pinelema yashanensis (Wang & Li, 2010) — China
- Pinelema yunchuni Zhao & Li, 2018 — China
- Pinelema zhenzhuang Zhao & Li, 2018 — Vietnam
- Pinelema zhewang (Chen & Zhu, 2009) — China
- Pinelema zonaria (Wang & Li, 2010) — China
