= Telemofila =

Telemofila Temporal range: Cretaceous– Present

Scientific classification
- Kingdom: Animalia
- Phylum: Arthropoda
- Subphylum: Chelicerata
- Class: Arachnida
- Order: Araneae
- Infraorder: Araneomorphae
- Family: Telemidae
- Genus: Telemofila; Wunderlich, 1995

Type species
- T. samosirensis Wunderlich, 1995

Species
- T. pecki (Brignoli, 1980) – New Caledonia; T. samosirensis Wunderlich, 1995 – Indonesia (Sumatra)

Genus of spiders

Telemofila is a genus of long-legged cave spiders that was first described by J. Wunderlich in 1995. As of September 2019 it contains two species, found on Sumatra and New Caledonia: T. pecki and T. samosirensis.
