= Cangoderces =

Scientific classification
- Kingdom: Animalia
- Phylum: Arthropoda
- Subphylum: Chelicerata
- Class: Arachnida
- Order: Araneae
- Infraorder: Araneomorphae
- Family: Telemidae
- Genus: Cangoderces; Harington, 1951

Type species
- C. lewisi Harington, 1951

Species
- 7, see text

Genus of spiders

Cangoderces is a genus of African long-legged cave spiders that was first described by Harington in 1951.

== Description ==
Cangoderces are very small spiders with a body size of less than 2 mm. The colour is brown, usually with a purplish blue sheen. The carapace is slightly wider than long. The sternum is fused to the labium or has a T-shaped suture. The spider has six eyes arranged in three diads. The inner cheliceral margin lacks a lamina, and both cheliceral furrows have teeth. The mouthparts have a rebordered labium.

The abdomen is slightly elongated, with a sclerotized zigzag ridge above the pedicel, which is more distinct in males. The spinnerets include a large rhomboidal colulus, and the anterior spinnerets are two-segmented. Book lungs are absent, but there are two pairs of tracheae with the posterior pair located near the middle. The legs are long and slender with few spines and have three claws. The tarsi lack trichobothria. The genitalia are haplogyne, with female genitalia having a single large spermatheca.

== Taxonomy ==
The genus Cangoderces was erected by Harington in 1951 based on seven females of the type species, C. lewisi, collected in the Cango Caves in south-western South Africa. It was originally placed in the Leptonetidae: Ochyroceratinae. Subsequently, Machado in 1956 transferred the genus to Telemidae, and Brignoli in 1978 described the male of C. lewisi for the first time. The genus Cangoderces is known from seven African species, of which two are known from South Africa.

== Species ==
As of September 2025, this genus includes seven African species:

- Cangoderces cameroonensis Baert, 1985 – Cameroon
- Cangoderces christae Wang & Li, 2011 – Ivory Coast
- Cangoderces globosus Wang, Li & Haddad, 2018 – South Africa
- Cangoderces koupeensis Baert, 1985 – Cameroon
- Cangoderces lewisi Harington, 1951 – South Africa (type species)
- Cangoderces milani Wang & Li, 2011 – Cameroon
- Cangoderces wewef Jocqué & Jocque, 2022 – DR Congo
