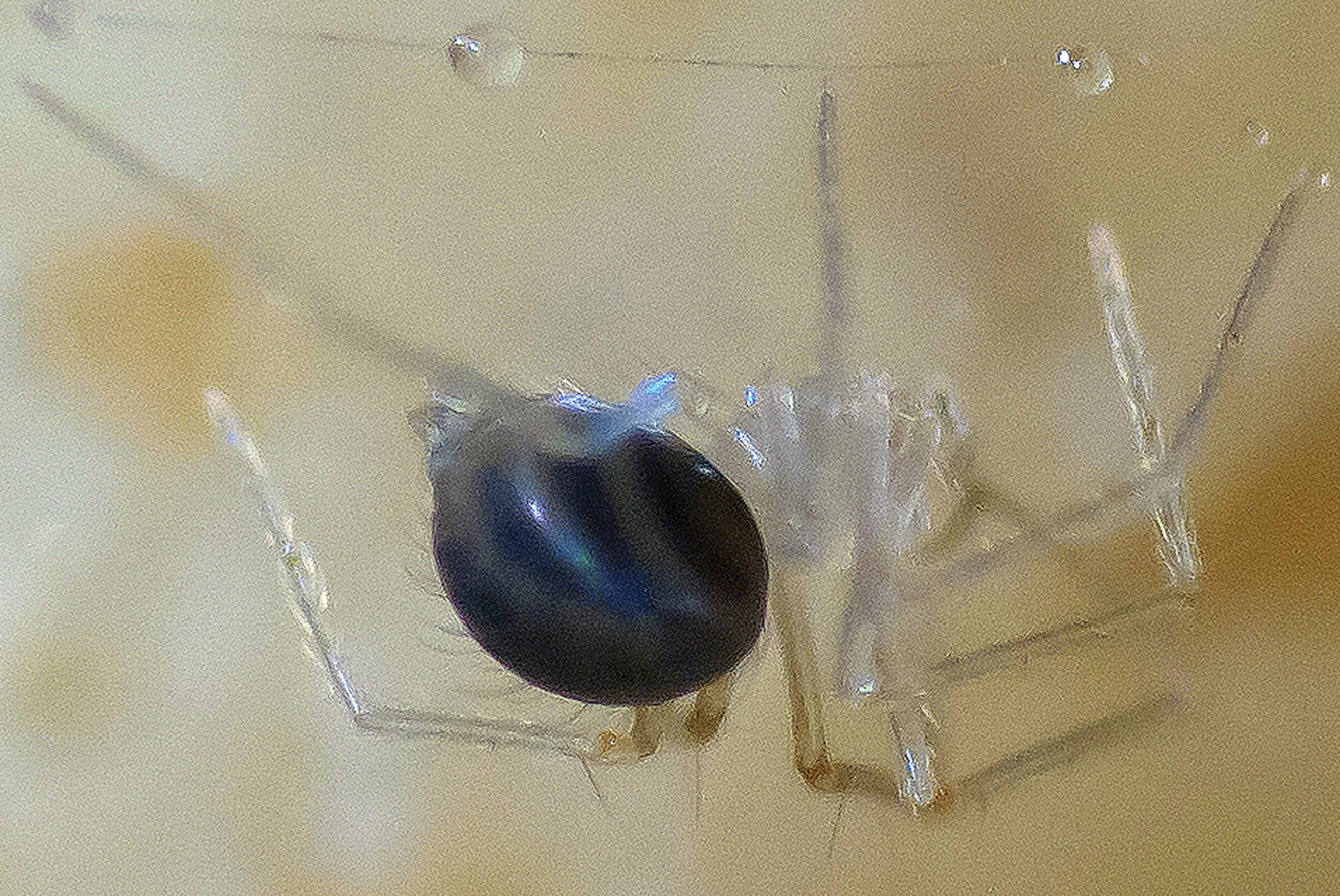
- Telema tenella

Scientific classification
- Kingdom: Animalia
- Phylum: Arthropoda
- Subphylum: Chelicerata
- Class: Arachnida
- Order: Araneae
- Infraorder: Araneomorphae
- Family: Telemidae
- Genus: Telema; Simon, 1882

Type species
- T. tenella Simon, 1882

Species
- 6, see text

= Telema =

Telema Temporal range: Palaeogene– Present

Genus of spiders

Telema is a genus of long-legged cave spiders that was first described by Eugène Louis Simon in 1882.

== Species ==
As of February 2022 it contains six species, most found in Asia, except for T. tenella, found in Europe, and T. mayana, found in Guatemala:

- Telema auricoma Lin & Li, 2010 – China
- Telema guihua Lin & Li, 2010 – China
- Telema mayana Gertsch, 1973 – Guatemala
- Telema nipponica (Yaginuma, 1972) – Japan
- Telema tenella Simon, 1882 (type) – Spain, France
- Telema wunderlichi Song & Zhu, 1994 – China

== See also ==
- Pinelema
- Usofila
