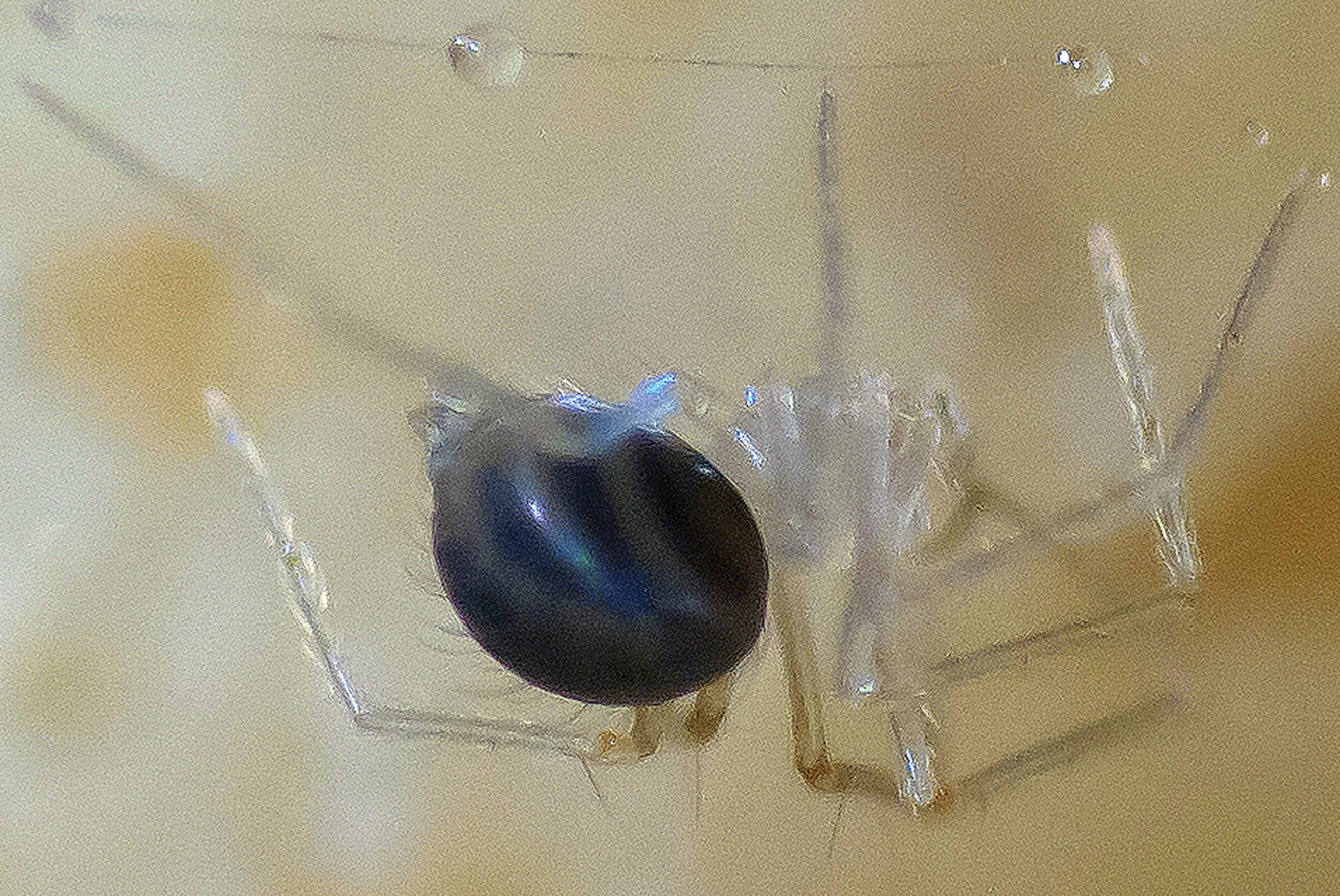
- Telema tenella
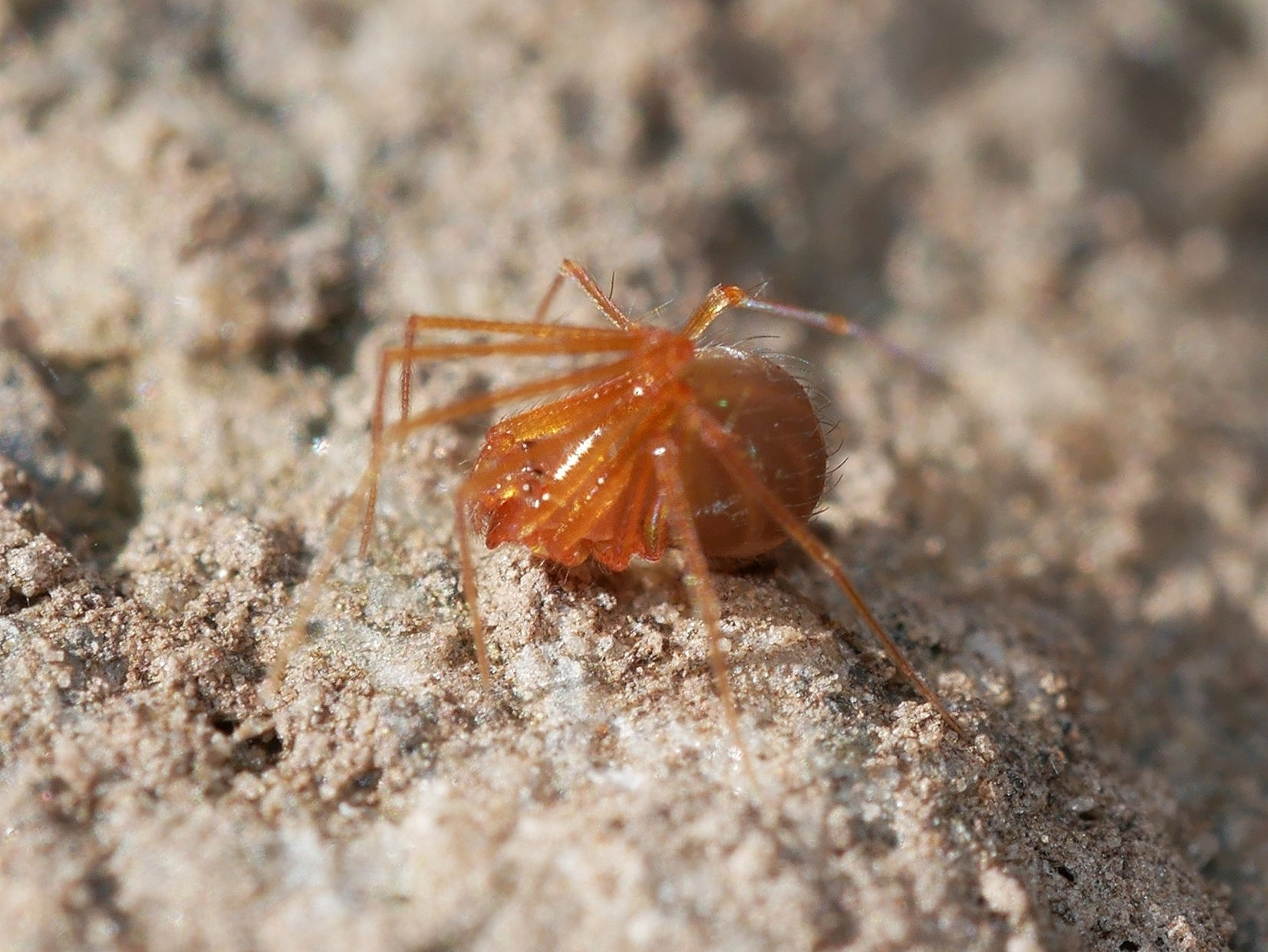
- Usofila flava

Scientific classification
- Kingdom: Animalia
- Phylum: Arthropoda
- Subphylum: Chelicerata
- Class: Arachnida
- Order: Araneae
- Infraorder: Araneomorphae
- Family: Telemidae; Fage, 1913

Diversity
- 16 genera, 113 species
- blue: reported countries (WSC) green: observation hotspots (iNaturalist)

= Telemidae =

Long-legged cave spiders Temporal range: Cretaceous–present

Family of spiders

Telemidae, also known as long-legged cave spiders, is a family of small haplogyne spiders with about 100 described species in sixteen genera. Most are cave-dwelling spiders with six eyes, though some do not have any eyes at all.

== Natural Environment ==
Telemidae are found predominantly in Tropical Rainforests and Karst caves. These species have been identified in the Southern Holarctic, Neotropical, Australasian (excluding Australia and New Zealand), Oriental, and Ethiopian realms.

They are usually found in Caves but have been observed in the surrounding area under leaf litter or rocks.

== Physical features ==
The legs are long, thin, relatively spineless, and do not have trichobothria. They have three pairs of spinnerets, the longest of which is toward the head. Instead of book lungs, they have two pairs of tracheal spiracles.

The elongate abdomen bears a hardened ridge above the pedicel running in a zigzag pattern that is more clearly defined in males than females. The pedipalp on males is oval and bag-like with a thin spermatophore. The female pedipalp does not have a claw.

== Genera ==
As of September 2025, this family includes sixteen genera and 113 species:

- Apneumonella Fage, 1921 – Asia (China, Malaysia, Indonesia (Sumatra)), Africa (Kenya, Tanzania)
- Burmalema Zhao & Li, 2022 – Myanmar
- Cangoderces Harington, 1951 – Cameroon, DR Congo, Ivory Coast, South Africa
- Guhua Zhao & Li, 2017 – Kenya
- Jocquella Baert, 1980 – New Guinea
- Kinku Dupérré & Tapia, 2015 – Ecuador
- Mekonglema Zhao & Li, 2020 – China, Laos, Thailand
- Milema Zhao & Li, 2022 – Thailand, Vietnam
- Pinelema Wang & Li, 2012 – China, Laos, Vietnam, Brazil
- Seychellia Saaristo, 1978 – Cameroon, Ivory Coast, Seychelles
- Siamlema Zhao & Li, 2020 – Thailand
- Sundalema Zhao & Li, 2020 – Indonesia (Sumatra), Thailand
- Telema Simon, 1882 – Asia (China, Japan, Korea), France, Spain, Guatemala
- Telemofila Wunderlich, 1995 – Indonesia (Sumatra), Malaysia (Borneo), New Caledonia, Singapore
- Usofila Keyserling, 1891 – North America
- Zhuanlema Zhao & Li, 2020 – Laos
