= Historia naturalis bulgarica =

- Discipline: geology, palaeontology, botany, zoology
- Language: English
- Edited by: Stanislav Abadjiev

Publication details
- History: 1989–present
- Publisher: National Museum of Natural History, Sofia
- Frequency: Monthly
- Open access: Yes
- License: CC BY 4.0

Standard abbreviations
- ISO 4: Hist. Nat. Bulg.

Indexing
- ISSN: 0205-3640 (print); 2603-3186 (web)

Links
- Journal homepage

Historia naturalis bulgarica is a peer-reviewed scientific journal, published by the National Museum of Natural History, Sofia, Bulgaria.

The journal is being published as of 1989, and as of 2018 is published only electronically. The journal published scientific contributions to paleontology, zoology, botany, geology and mineralogy, as well as original articles on history of natural sciences and natural history institutions. The papers are published in English language only under the free license CC BY 4.0.

== Editorial board ==
Editor-in-Chief is Stanislav Abadjiev, and the members of the Editorial Board are Georgi N. Markov, Mario Langurov, Nikolay Simov, Peter Shurulinkov, Christo Deltshev, Fedor V. Konstantinov, Giancarlo Statti, Peter Jäger, Rossen Tzonev, Snejana Grozeva, and others.

== Indexing ==
As of June 2021, Historia naturalis bulgarica is indexed in the Crossref, Directory of Open Access Journals (DOAJ), Scopus.

== Index descriptus ==
The journal maintains an "Index descriptus" representing a list of newly described organisms, new subspecies, species and a genus, whose descriptions appear for the first time on the pages of Historia naturalis bulgarica. As of October 2020, the list contains 53 taxa, geographically located in Albania, Antarctica, Bulgaria, China, Cuba, France, Greece, Iceland, Mexico, Nepal, Nigeria, North Korea, Papua New Guinea, Tunisia, Turkey.

Year	Taxon from Index descriptus	Genus
1998	Actitis balcanica	Actitis
2004	Alistratia	Alistratia
2004	Alistratia beroni	Alistratia
1991	Athripsodes ceracleoides	Athripsodes
2007	Batrisodes mitovi	Batrisodes
2015	Bythiospeum iltchokolevi	Bythiospeum
2000	Caeculisoma haussa	Caeculisoma
2000	Cecidopus nigeriae	Cecidopus
1991	Ceraclea armata	Ceraclea
1991	Ceraclea coreana	Ceraclea
1991	Ceraclea gigantea	Ceraclea
1991	Ceraclea morsei	Ceraclea
2020	Chauvireria bulgarica	Chauvireria
1998	Coccothraustes balcanicus	Coccothraustes
1998	Coccothraustes simeonovi	Coccothraustes
1997	Cordioniscus kalimnosi	Cordioniscus
2002	Cordioniscus schmalfussi	Cordioniscus
2000	Cymindis beroni	Cymindis
2000	Cymindis uyguricus	Cymindis
2008	Dicyphus constrictus eduardi	Dicyphus
2002	Elaphoidella brevicaudata	Elaphoidella
2000	Euscorpius beroni	Euscorpius
1998	Fulica atra pontica	Fulica
1997	Gabrius beroni	Gabrius
2016	Heterolaophonte islandica	Heterolaophonte
1990	Hydroptila asymmetrica	Hydroptila
1990	Hydroptila botosaneanui	Hydroptila
1990	Hydroptila coreana	Hydroptila
1990	Hydroptila extrema	Hydroptila
1990	Hydroptila hubenovi	Hydroptila
2012	Laemostenus tiouirii	Laemostenus
2020	Maraenobiotus rhodopensis	Maraenobiotus
2020	Maraenobiotus rilaensis	Maraenobiotus
1997	Molops piceus osogovensis	Molops
1997	Molops rufipes denteletus	Molops
1995	Neotrombidium cubanum	Neotrombidium
2001	Niphargus bulgaricus	Niphargus
2012	Niphargus turcicus	Niphargus
1991	Oecetis testacea orientalis	Oecetis
2001	Otostigmus beroni	Otostigmus
1990	Oxyethira josifovi	Oxyethira
2004	Paralaophonte livingstoni	Paralaophonte
1996	Paraphanolophus halffteri	Paraphanolophus
2020	Phasianus bulgaricus	Phasianus
2008	Pseudonychocamptus kolarovi	Pseudonychocamptus
1999	Regulus bulgaricus	Regulus
1990	Rhyacophila kumgangsanica	Rhyacophila
2001	Schizidium beroni	Schizidium
1990	Stactobia sujangsanica	Stactobia
2000	Trichoniscus garevi	Trichoniscus
2002	Trichoniscus petrovi	Trichoniscus
2002	Trichoniscus stoevi	Trichoniscus
2002	Trichosmaris papuana	Trichosmaris
