= Ivan Buresh =

Bulgarian zoologist

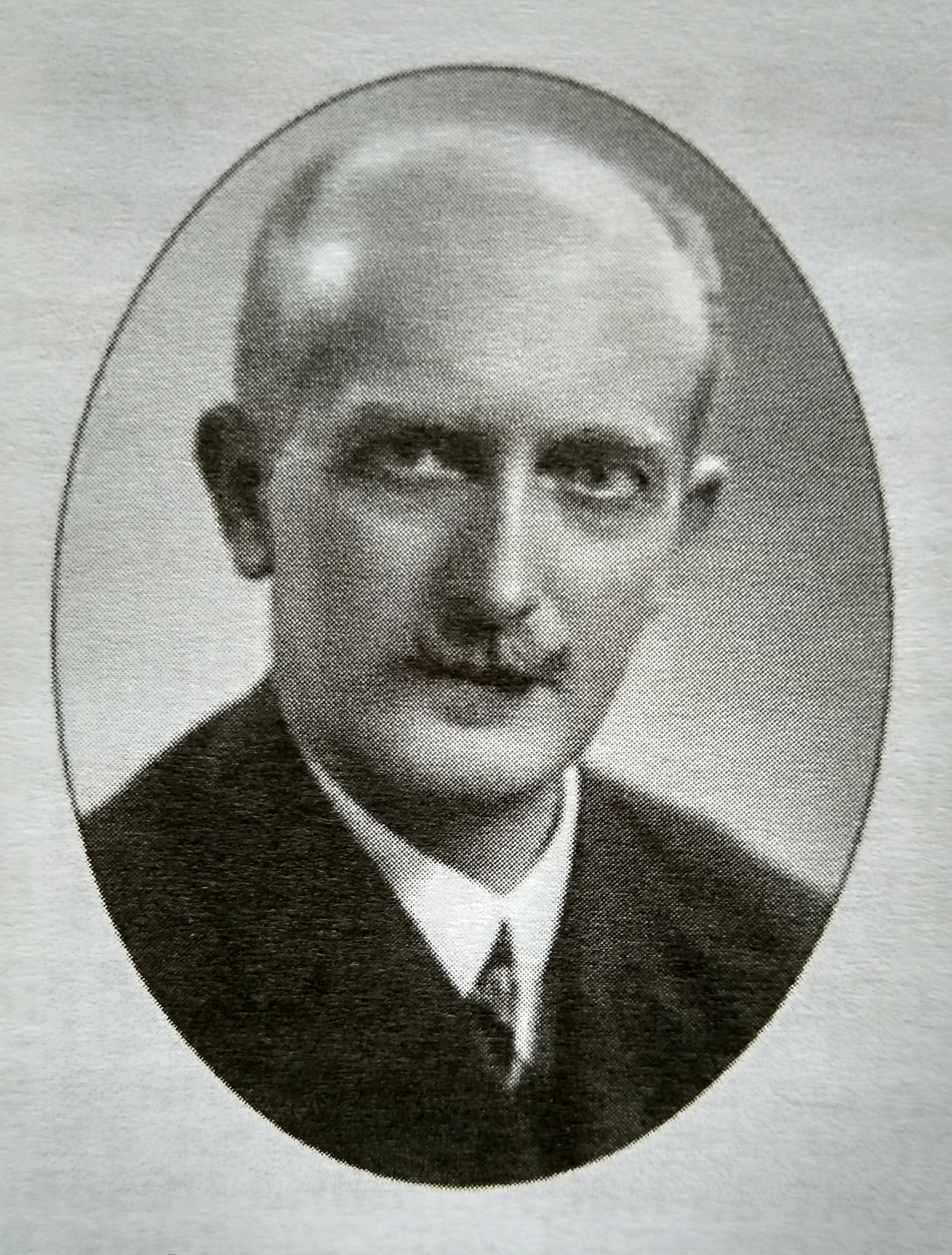
- Born: 27 December 1885; Sofia, Principality of Bulgaria
- Died: 8 August 1980 (aged 94); Sofia, Bulgarian People's Republic
- Citizenship: Bulgarian
- Education: Charles University, Prague; Sofia University
- Scientific career
- Fields: zoology entomology
- Workplaces: Bulgarian Academy of Sciences

Ivan Yosifov Buresh (Bulgarian: Иван Йосифов Буреш; 27 December 1885, Sofia, Bulgaria – 8 August 1980, Sofia, Bulgaria) was a Bulgarian zoologist and entomologist who has been dubbed "the patriarch of Bulgarian biology". He contributed to entomology, speleology, herpetology, and botany, and wrote over 200 scientific and popular science articles. Buresh served as curator and later director of the Royal Museum of Natural History, became a full member of the Bulgarian Academy of Sciences in 1929, and led its Institute of Zoology from 1947 to 1959.

== Early life and education ==
Ivan Buresh was born in Sofia, the capital of the Principality of Bulgaria, to the family of Czech zincographer and photographer Josef Bureš who had settled in Bulgaria after the Liberation in 1878. Buresh finished high school in Sofia and studied natural science at Charles University in Prague and Sofia University. He graduated in 1909 and continued his post-graduate education at the Ludwig-Maximilians-Universität München under world-famous zoologist Richard Hertwig and Franz Theodor Doflein.

== Career ==
Buresh took an interest in zoology in his school years. He published his first article on that subject in 1905; his body of work includes over 200 scientific and popular science articles. Although his main area of research was entomology, he also contributed to Bulgarian spelaeology, herpetology and botany. He is responsible for the planting of cacti in St. Thomas Island, one of the scant places in Bulgaria where the plants grow.

From 1914 on, Buresh was curator of the Royal Museum of Natural History. In 1918, he was promoted to director of the Royal Institutes of Natural Science, which included the Royal Museum of Natural History, the Sofia Zoo and the Botanical Garden, among other institutions. He held that post until 1946. In 1926, he was admitted to the Bulgarian Academy of Sciences as a corresponding member; in 1929, he became a full academic member. From 1947 until his retirement in 1959, Buresh headed the Bulgarian Academy of Sciences' Institute of Zoology. Buresh died in Sofia in 1980, aged 94.

Despite his close ties to both Tsar Ferdinand and Tsar Boris III, Buresh was never actively engaged in politics.
