= Cordioniscus stebbingi =

Scientific classification
- Kingdom: Animalia
- Phylum: Arthropoda
- Class: Malacostraca
- Order: Isopoda
- Suborder: Oniscidea
- Family: Trichoniscidae
- Genus: Cordioniscus
- Species: C. stebbingi

Binomial name
- Cordioniscus stebbingi (Patience, 1907)

Synonyms
- Nesiotoniscus valentiae (Arcangeli, 1935); Trichoniscus valentiae Arcangeli, 1935

Species of crustacean

Cordioniscus stebbingi is a species of woodlouse in the family Trichoniscidae. It is found in Europe and Northern Asia (excluding China) and North America.

== Subspecies ==
These two subspecies belong to the species Cordioniscus stebbingi:

- Cordioniscus stebbingi boettgeri Verhoeff, 1929
- Cordioniscus stebbingi stebbingi
