= National Museum of Natural History, Bulgaria =

National Museum of Natural History
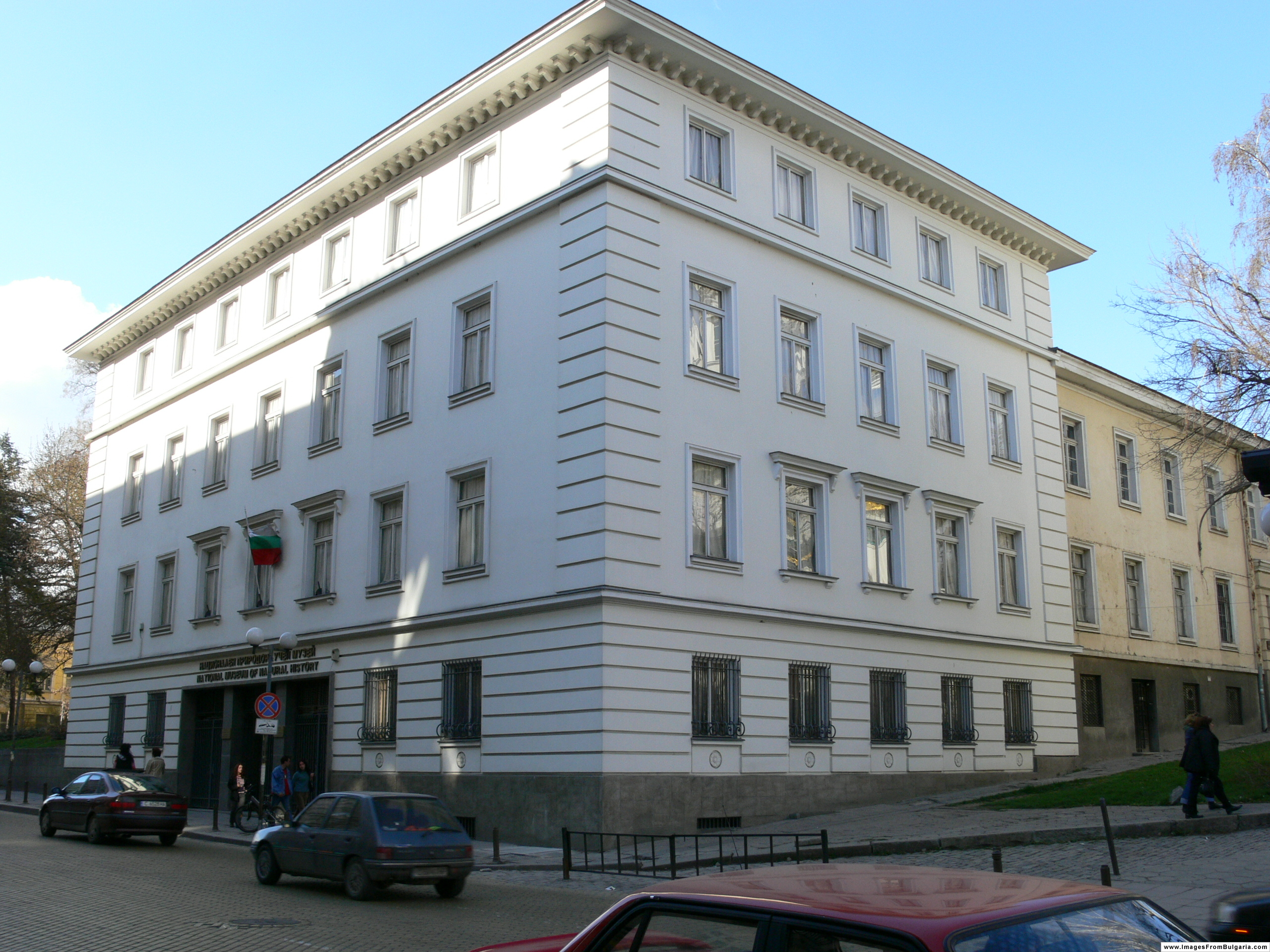
- Main Building
- Established: 1889
- Location: Sofia, Bulgaria
- Coordinates: 42°41′44.46″N 23°19′42.47″E
- Type: Natural history museum
- Director: Pavel Stoev
- Website: www.nmnhs.com

Video released on the occasion of the museum's 135th anniversary in 2024

The National Museum of Natural History (Bulgarian: Национален природонаучен музей, Natsionalen prirodonauchen muzey), or NMNHS, is a natural history museum in the Bulgarian capital of Sofia.

== History ==
Founded in 1889, it is affiliated with the Bulgarian Academy of Sciences and is the first and largest museum of this kind on the Balkans.

The Museum's collection includes over 400 stuffed mammals, over 1,200 species of birds, hundreds of thousands of insects and other invertebrates, as well as samples of about one quarter of the world's minerals.

The museum was founded in 1889 as the Natural History Museum of Knyaz Ferdinand of Bulgaria, with various foreign and Bulgarian specialists (e.g. Ivan Buresh, director from 1913 to 1947) serving as its directors until 1947, when the museum became part of the Bulgarian Academy of Sciences' Zoological Institute.

The museum became autonomous as a separate institute within the system of BAS in 1974.

In 1992, the Asenovgrad Palaeontology Museum, an NMNH branch, was founded in Asenovgrad.

The museum publishes the monthly Historia naturalis bulgarica journal.

== Departments ==
- Palaeontology and Mineralogy
- Botany
- Invertebrates
- Vertebrates
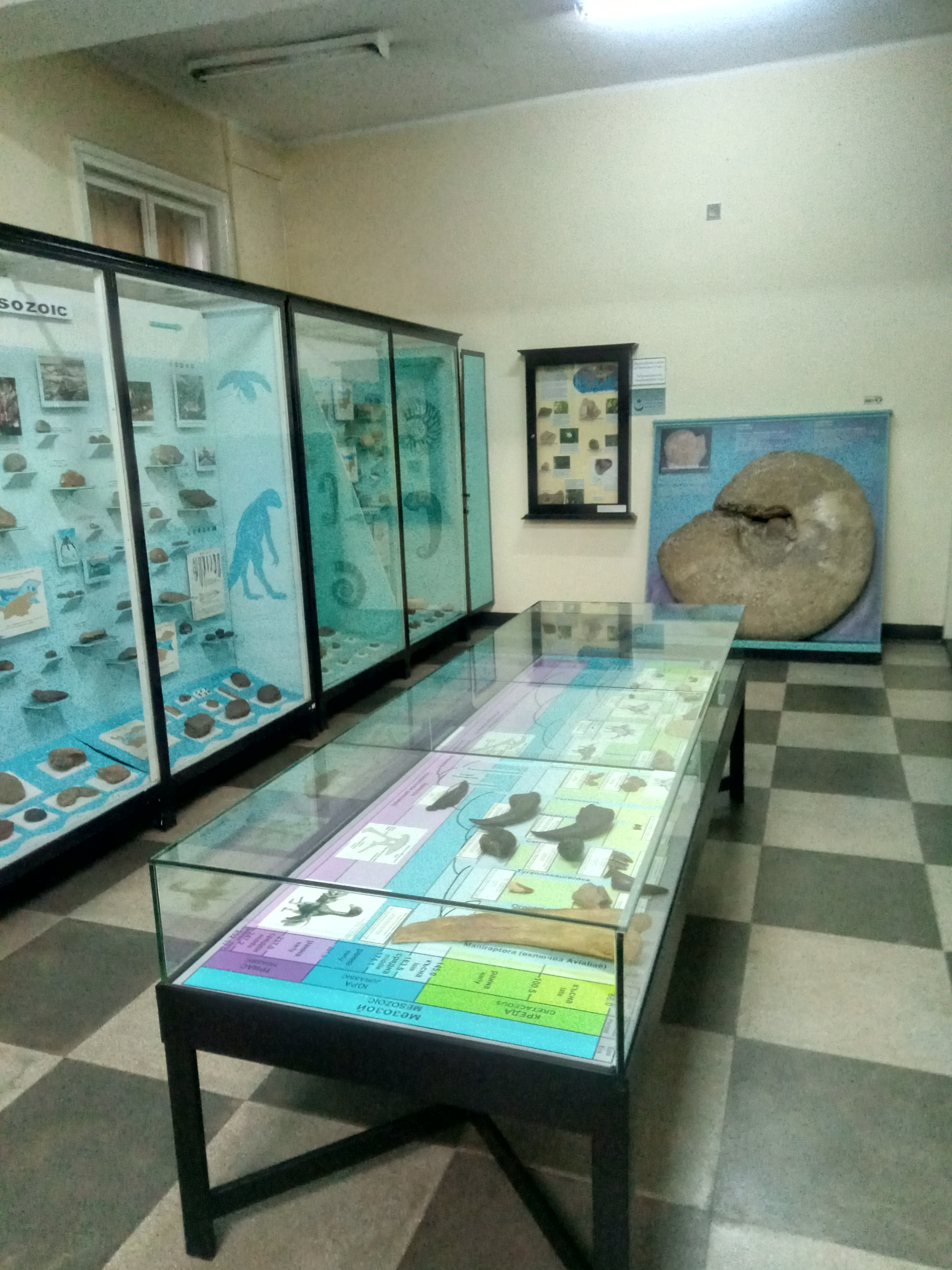
A view of the Paleontology Hall

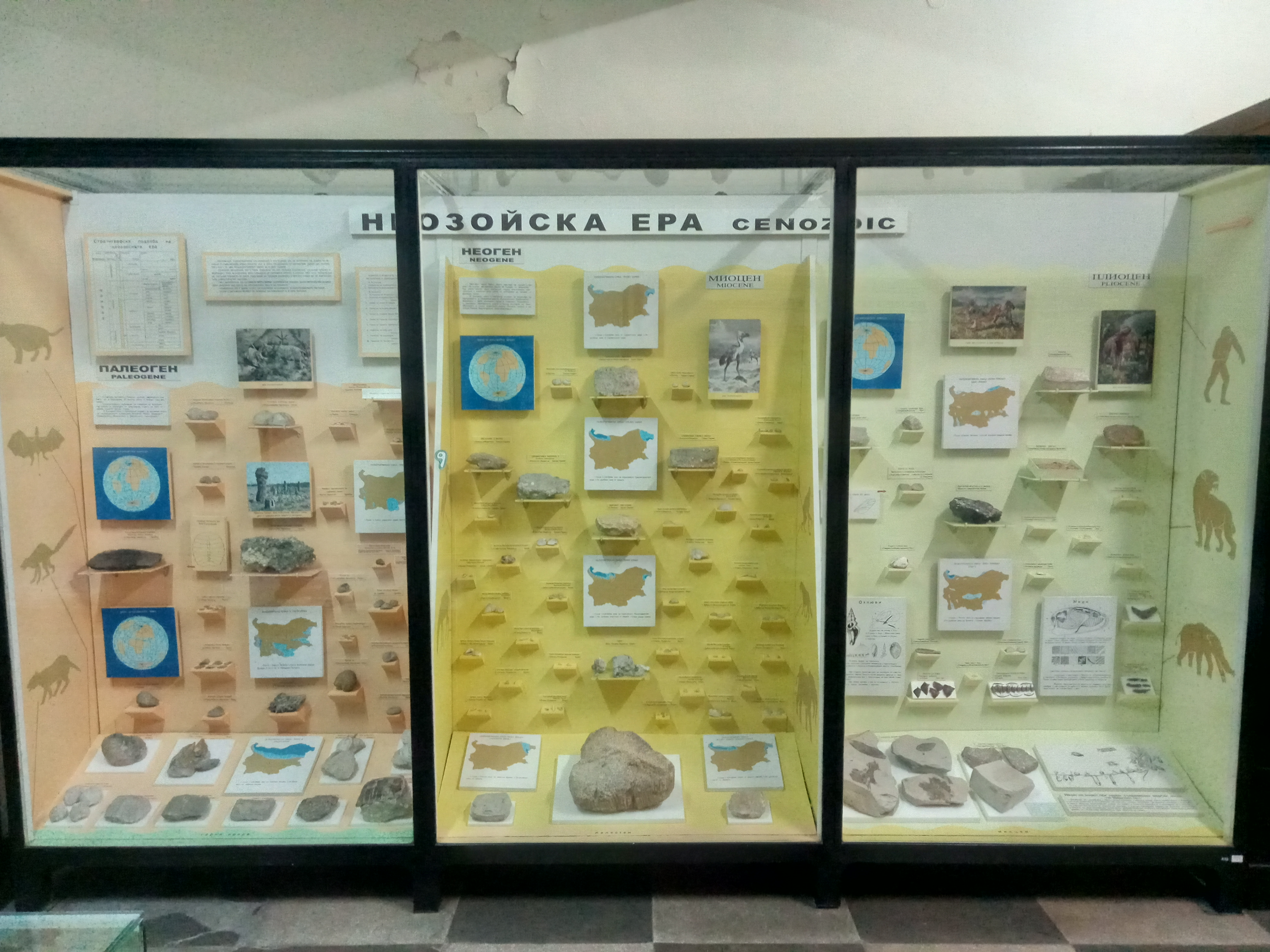
The Cenozoic Era

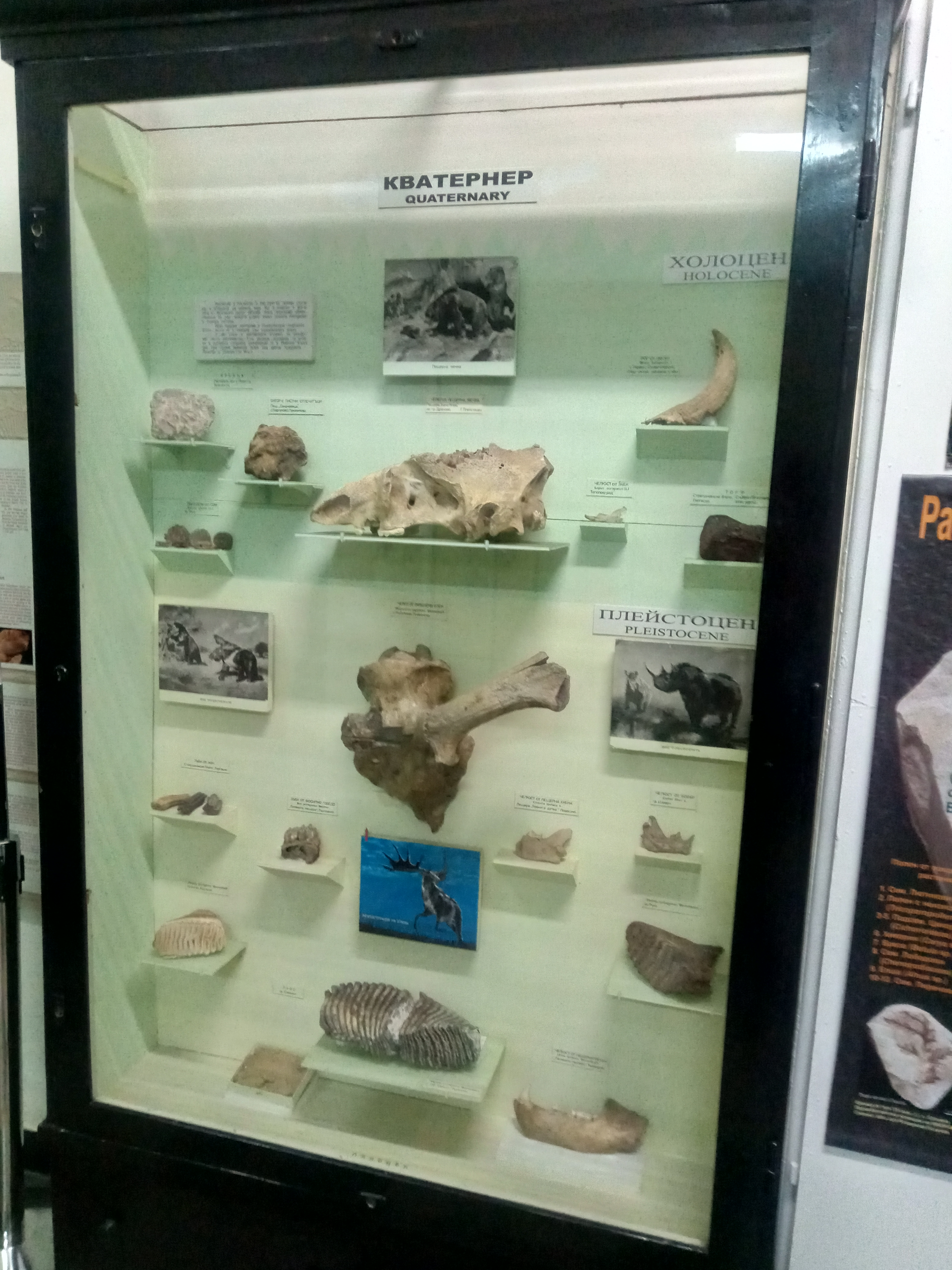
The Quaternary Period

== See also ==
- Boyan Petrov
