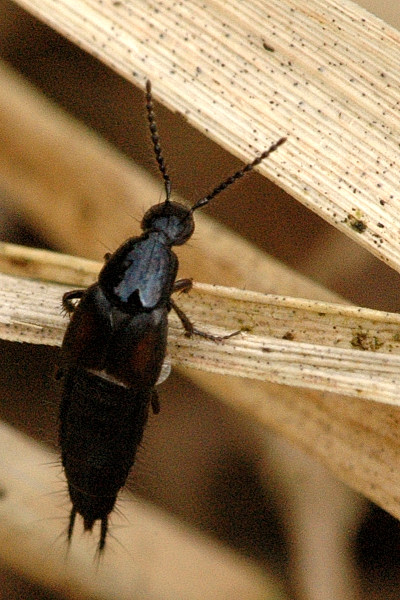
- Gabrius exiguus

Scientific classification
- Kingdom: Animalia
- Phylum: Arthropoda
- Clade: Pancrustacea
- Class: Insecta
- Order: Coleoptera
- Suborder: Polyphaga
- Infraorder: Staphyliniformia
- Family: Staphylinidae
- Genus: Gabrius; Stephens, 1829

= Gabrius =

Genus of beetles

Gabrius is a large genus of beetles containing over 450 species belonging to the family Staphylinidae.

The genus has cosmopolitan distribution.

== Species: ==
The genus contains the following species:

- Gabrius abas Smetana, 1984
- Gabrius aberdarensis (Bernhauer, 1939)
- Gabrius abscissus Tottenham, 1962
- Gabrius accipiter Hromádka, 2014
- Gabrius adelae Hromádka, 2011
- Gabrius adustus (Casey, 1915)
- Gabrius aegon Smetana, 1995
- Gabrius aelius Smetana, 1995
- Gabrius agiliformis Tottenham, 1956
- Gabrius aliicornis (Bernhauer, 1939)
- Gabrius allardi Levasseur, 1967
- Gabrius almorensis (Cameron, 1932)
- Gabrius altissimus (Bernhauer, 1939)
- Gabrius amadina Hromádka, 2014
- Gabrius amanensis Schillhammer, 1990
- Gabrius amans Tottenham, 1962
- Gabrius amulius Smetana, 1995
- Gabrius anastomus Hromádka, 2016
- Gabrius anatolicus Smetana, 1953
- Gabrius ancoripenis Cho, Young Bok & Chang Eon Lee, 1997
- Gabrius angusticeps (Bernhauer, 1933)
- Gabrius apomontis Schillhammer, 2000
- Gabrius appendiculatus Sharp, 1910
- Gabrius approximans (Sharp, 1885)
- Gabrius arctocebus Hromádka, 2014
- Gabrius ardea Hromádka, 2014
- Gabrius ardeola Hromadka, 2011
- Gabrius arenaria Hromádka, 2016
- Gabrius argentinus (Bernhauer, 1912)
- Gabrius armatipes (Sharp, 1885)
- Gabrius armeniacus Coiffait, 1966
- Gabrius arnoldii Smetana, 1961
- Gabrius assingi Hromádka, 2016
- Gabrius astutoides (Strand, A., 1946)
- Gabrius astutus (Erichson, 1840)
- Gabrius atlasicus Coiffait, 1973
- Gabrius atricolor (Sharp, 1885)
- Gabrius aureus Drugmand, 1990
- Gabrius austriacus Scheerpeltz, 1947
- Gabrius autumnalis (Cameron, 1932)
- Gabrius aviceda Hromadka, 2015
- Gabrius badilikus Tottenham, 1956
- Gabrius badius (Kiesenwetter, 1858)
- Gabrius bafutensis Levasseur, 1967
- Gabrius balaeniceps Hromádka, 2014
- Gabrius batangensis Li, Liang, Schillhammer & Hong-Zhang Zhou, 2010
- Gabrius beroni Raichev, 1997
- Gabrius bescidicus Smetana, 1954
- Gabrius besucheti Schillhammer, 1997
- Gabrius bidentatus (Horn, 1884)
- Gabrius bifidus Tottenham, 1962
- Gabrius birmanus Schillhammer, 1997
- Gabrius bishopi Sharp, 1910
- Gabrius breviantennatus Li, Liang, Schillhammer & Hong-Zhang Zhou, 2010
- Gabrius brevipennis (Horn, 1884)
- Gabrius brevissimus Tottenham, 1956
- Gabrius brevistrigatus Li, Liang, Schillhammer & Hong-Zhang Zhou, 2010
- Gabrius breviventer (Sperk, 1835)
- Gabrius bugeranus Hromadka, 2015
- Gabrius bulbifer Schillhammer, 1997
- Gabrius bulgaricus Coiffait, 1971
- Gabrius burckhardti Schillhammer, 1997
- Gabrius burgeoni (Bernhauer, 1928)
- Gabrius bycanistes Hromádka, 2014
- Gabrius calix Schillhammer, 2001
- Gabrius calonectris Hromádka, 2014
- Gabrius canariensis (Fauvel, 1898)
- Gabrius candicus Assing, 2019
- Gabrius caporiaccoi Gridelli, 1934
- Gabrius capucinus Schillhammer, 1997
- Gabrius cascadensis Scheerpeltz, 1974
- Gabrius castor Schillhammer, 2011
- Gabrius championi (Sharp, 1885)
- Gabrius chapmani (Bernhauer, 1939)
- Gabrius chiriquiensis Herman, 2001
- Gabrius chrysochloris Hromádka, 2014
- Gabrius chrysococcyx Hromádka, 2014
- Gabrius cinctiventris Scheerpeltz, 1965
- Gabrius claviger Tottenham, 1956
- Gabrius cleon Smetana, 1995
- Gabrius clunalis (Horn, 1884)
- Gabrius cobosi Coiffait, 1964
- Gabrius coeruleipennis Coiffait, 1983
- Gabrius collartianus (Cameron, 1935)
- Gabrius colossus Schillhammer, 1997
- Gabrius confusoides Schillhammer, 2000
- Gabrius confusus (Cameron, 1932)
- Gabrius contumax Schillhammer, 2001
- Gabrius convexiceps Scheerpeltz, 1965
- Gabrius coracias Hromádka, 2014
- Gabrius coryndoni (Cameron, 1942)
- Gabrius corythaeola Hromádka, 2014
- Gabrius coturnix Hromádka, 2014
- Gabrius crassulus (Horn, 1884)
- Gabrius curvipenis Schillhammer, 1997
- Gabrius curvus Li, Liang, Schillhammer & Hong-Zhang Zhou, 2010
- Gabrius cushmani (Hatch, 1957)
- Gabrius cyanolanius Hromadka, 2011
- Gabrius cyphonotus Joy, 1913
- Gabrius damon Smetana, 1984
- Gabrius darjeelingensis Schillhammer, 1997
- Gabrius deceptivus (Cameron, 1943)
- Gabrius deceptor (Cameron, 1932)
- Gabrius deceptoroides Schillhammer, 1997
- Gabrius definitus (Cameron, 1950)
- Gabrius deflexus Tottenham, 1956
- Gabrius delamarei Jarrige, 1970
- Gabrius demades Smetana, 1984
- Gabrius dentatus Li, Liang, Schillhammer & Hong-Zhang Zhou, 2010
- Gabrius dentipes (Eppelsheim, 1889)
- Gabrius desperatus Schillhammer, 1997
- Gabrius dicrurus Hromádka, 2015
- Gabrius dieckmanni Smetana, 1957
- Gabrius diengensis Schillhammer, 1997
- Gabrius diomedea Hromádka, 2014
- Gabrius disjunctus (Bernhauer & K. Schubert, 1914)
- Gabrius disparatus Li, Liang, Schillhammer & Hong-Zhang Zhou, 2010
- Gabrius distans (Horn, 1884)
- Gabrius distinguendus (Cameron, 1950)
- Gabrius divisifrons (Cameron, 1950)
- Gabrius doderoi Gridelli, 1920
- Gabrius dolosus Tottenham, 1956
- Gabrius dubiosus (Bernhauer, 1936)
- Gabrius dufbergi Gillerfors, 1997
- Gabrius egens (Sharp, 1874)
- Gabrius egentoides Schillhammer, 2011
- Gabrius egnatius Smetana, 1995
- Gabrius egretta Hromádka, 2015
- Gabrius elegans (Sharp, 1885)
- Gabrius elephantulus Hromádka, 2014
- Gabrius ellipticeps Scheerpeltz, 1965
- Gabrius elypticus (Bernhauer, 1932)
- Gabrius emeishanus Schillhammer, 1996
- Gabrius eminens Schillhammer, 2001
- Gabrius epichoristodes Hromádka, 2014
- Gabrius epomophorus Hromádka, 2014
- Gabrius eremius Herman, 2001
- Gabrius eumolpus Smetana, 1995
- Gabrius excelsoides Schillhammer, 1997
- Gabrius excisicauda (Bernhauer, 1939)
- Gabrius exiguus (Nordmann, 1837)
- Gabrius exsculptus Assing, 2004
- Gabrius exspectatus Smetana, 1952
- Gabrius extraneus Li, Liang, Schillhammer & Hong-Zhang Zhou, 2010
- Gabrius fageli Drugmand, 1990
- Gabrius fallaciosus (Horn, 1884)
- Gabrius falsimitator Schillhammer, 1997
- Gabrius fauveli (Coquerel, 1866)
- Gabrius femoralis (Hochhuth, 1851)
- Gabrius fenderi (Hatch, 1957)
- Gabrius feretrius Smetana, 1995
- Gabrius fimbriolatus (Erichson, 1840)
- Gabrius fimetarioides (Scheerpeltz, 1976)
- Gabrius fissiceps Schillhammer, 2000
- Gabrius flexuellus Tottenham, 1956
- Gabrius forcipatus (Hatch, 1957)
- Gabrius forsterianus (Scheerpeltz, 1960)
- Gabrius franzi Smetana, 1967
- Gabrius frischi Schillhammer, 2011
- Gabrius fulmarus Hromádka, 2014
- Gabrius furtivus (Cameron, 1932)
- Gabrius gabrieli Schillhammer, 1997
- Gabrius gabrioides (Bernhauer, 1913)
- Gabrius gagliardii Gridelli, 1936
- Gabrius gelo Smetana, 1984
- Gabrius gerardi (Bernhauer, 1928)
- Gabrius glareola Hromádka, 2014
- Gabrius gomyi Lecoq, 1990
- Gabrius gongulus (Tottenham, 1949)
- Gabrius graecus Bordoni, 1994
- Gabrius grassei Levasseur, 1980
- Gabrius gratellus (Cameron, 1932)
- Gabrius gunungapi Schillhammer, 1997
- Gabrius habilis Tottenham, 1956
- Gabrius halcyon Hromádka, 2014
- Gabrius halisius Tottenham, 1956
- Gabrius halobaena Hromádka, 2014
- Gabrius hammondi Schillhammer, 1997
- Gabrius haptsui Schillhammer, 2000
- Gabrius hartmanni Schillhammer, 2000
- Gabrius hazarahensis Tronquet, 1981
- Gabrius helogale Hromádka, 2014
- Gabrius hercules Schillhammer, 1997
- Gabrius heres Smetana, 1962
- Gabrius hesperius (Fauvel, 1878)
- Gabrius himalayicus (Bernhauer, 1915)
- Gabrius hippisleyae Smetana, 1995
- Gabrius hiranoi Hayashi, Y., 2021
- Gabrius hirthei Schillhammer, 2000
- Gabrius hirundo Hromádka, 2014
- Gabrius hissaricus Schillhammer, 2003
- Gabrius hoberlandti Smetana, 1953
- Gabrius hoggarensis Coiffait, 1966
- Gabrius holisinus (Fauvel, 1904)
- Gabrius hong Li, Liang, Schillhammer & Hong-Zhang Zhou, 2010
- Gabrius hornaditanus (Rambousek, 1925)
- Gabrius huendus Tottenham, 1956
- Gabrius humidulus (Cameron, 1932)
- Gabrius hyas Smetana, 1995
- Gabrius hydrophilus Schillhammer, 1997
- Gabrius ignobilis (Cameron, 1943)
- Gabrius imitator (Fauvel, 1895)
- Gabrius incubens Schillhammer, 1991
- Gabrius ingratus (Fauvel, 1905)
- Gabrius insidiosus Tottenham, 1962
- Gabrius insignis (Luze, 1904)
- Gabrius instrigatus Li, Liang, Schillhammer & Hong-Zhang Zhou, 2010
- Gabrius interceptionis Schillhammer, 1997
- Gabrius invisus Li, Liang, Schillhammer & Hong-Zhang Zhou, 2012
- Gabrius io Smetana, 1984
- Gabrius istonyx Hromádka, 2014
- Gabrius jaechi Schillhammer, 1997
- Gabrius japonicus Shibata, Y., 1991
- Gabrius javanicus Schillhammer, 1997
- Gabrius jeannelianus (Bernhauer, 1939)
- Gabrius jendeki Schillhammer, 1997
- Gabrius jujuyensis (Bernhauer, 1921)
- Gabrius kabisus Tottenham, 1956
- Gabrius kabulensis Tronquet, 1981
- Gabrius kahleni Schillhammer, 1992
- Gabrius kambaitiensis Scheerpeltz, 1965
- Gabrius katonae (Bernhauer, 1915)
- Gabrius kerinciensis Schillhammer, 1997
- Gabrius keysianus Sharp, 1910
- Gabrius kivulius Tottenham, 1956
- Gabrius kleebergi Schillhammer, 1997
- Gabrius kobayashii Smetana, 1984
- Gabrius koreanus Schillhammer, 2015
- Gabrius kuanshanensis (Bernhauer, 1914)
- Gabrius kuliabensis (Bernhauer, 1915)
- Gabrius laciades Smetana, 1995
- Gabrius lackneri Schillhammer, 2011
- Gabrius laelaps Smetana, 1995
- Gabrius lapidicola (Cameron, 1932)
- Gabrius larus Hromádka, 2014
- Gabrius laticollis (Fauvel, 1874)
- Gabrius latro Joy, 1913
- Gabrius lebedevi (Bernhauer, 1910)
- Gabrius leigongshanus Li, Liang, Schillhammer & Hong-Zhang Zhou, 2010
- Gabrius leleupi Tottenham, 1962
- Gabrius lemur Jarrige, 1978
- Gabrius lepidina Hromádka, 2014
- Gabrius lethifer Tottenham, 1956
- Gabrius linauensis Schillhammer, 2000
- Gabrius lividipes (Baudi di Selve, 1848)
- Gabrius loebli Schillhammer, 1997
- Gabrius lomaensis Levasseur, 1971
- Gabrius lysippus Smetana, 1995
- Gabrius macer Lecoq, 1990
- Gabrius magniceps (Cameron, 1948)
- Gabrius magnicollis (Bernhauer, 1915)
- Gabrius makranczyi Schillhammer, 2015
- Gabrius malaysianus Schillhammer, 1997
- Gabrius malickyi Schillhammer, 2000
- Gabrius mandschuricus (Bernhauer, 1914)
- Gabrius marakwetensis (Bernhauer, 1939)
- Gabrius marshalli (Cameron, 1951)
- Gabrius martensi Schillhammer, 1997
- Gabrius martialis (Cameron, 1932)
- Gabrius martialoides Schillhammer, 1997
- Gabrius matatielensis Scheerpeltz, 1974
- Gabrius mcneilli Schillhammer, 1997
- Gabrius mediocris (Cameron, 1943)
- Gabrius meghalayensis Schillhammer, 1997
- Gabrius megophthalmus (Cameron, 1948)
- Gabrius mengensis Smetana, 1967
- Gabrius meridies Smetana, 1995
- Gabrius metagenes Tottenham, 1956
- Gabrius methalius Tottenham, 1956
- Gabrius microphthalmus (Horn, 1884)
- Gabrius minahasa Schillhammer, 1997
- Gabrius minax Tottenham, 1962
- Gabrius mirei Levasseur, 1967
- Gabrius misellus (Sharp, 1885)
- Gabrius montanus (Bernhauer, 1934)
- Gabrius monticola (Bernhauer, 1931)
- Gabrius morator Schillhammer, 1997
- Gabrius mubilibanus (Cameron, 1950)
- Gabrius muelleri Gridelli, 1928
- Gabrius mungos Hromádka, 2014
- Gabrius musonoiensis Levasseur, 1967
- Gabrius myohyangsani Paśnik, 2000
- Gabrius nasiformis Li, Liang, Schillhammer & Hong-Zhang Zhou, 2010
- Gabrius negus Tottenham, 1956
- Gabrius neobisniformis (Bernhauer, 1915)
- Gabrius nepalensis Schillhammer, 1997
- Gabrius nepos Smetana, 1984
- Gabrius neptunus Schillhammer, 1997
- Gabrius nguembaensis Levasseur, 1968
- Gabrius nidicola (Bernhauer, 1921)
- Gabrius nigritulus (Gravenhorst, 1802)
- Gabrius nitetis Tottenham, 1956
- Gabrius nitidipennis (Solier, 1849)
- Gabrius normandi Smetana, 1956
- Gabrius novellus Tottenham, 1956
- Gabrius novus (Cameron, 1935)
- Gabrius nugax (Sharp, 1885)
- Gabrius obenbergeri Smetana, 1953
- Gabrius oblidens Tottenham, 1956
- Gabrius obnixus Tottenham, 1956
- Gabrius obscuratus (Cameron, 1950)
- Gabrius oceanicus Tottenham, 1956
- Gabrius oceanus (Hatch, 1957)
- Gabrius oena Hromádka, 2014
- Gabrius okamotoi Shibata, Y., 1991
- Gabrius ophion Smetana, 1984
- Gabrius osseticus (Kolenati, 1846)
- Gabrius ovaliceps (Fall, 1930)
- Gabrius ovaticeps (Sharp, 1885)
- Gabrius pakistanicus Schillhammer, 1997
- Gabrius palmi Schillhammer, 1992
- Gabrius parabadilikus Tottenham, 1962
- Gabrius parallelicollis Schillhammer, 2001
- Gabrius parkeri (Cameron, 1932)
- Gabrius pelzelmayeri (Bernhauer, 1939)
- Gabrius peninsula Tottenham, 1962
- Gabrius perexcelsus (Tottenham, 1939)
- Gabrius perflexus Schillhammer, 1997
- Gabrius perodicticus Hromádka, 2014
- Gabrius peruvianus (Bernhauer, 1916)
- Gabrius peyerimhoffi Coiffait, 1964
- Gabrius phelsuma Hromádka, 2007
- Gabrius philo Smetana, 1984
- Gabrius philomimus Schillhammer, 2000
- Gabrius philonthoides Schillhammer, 1992
- Gabrius picipennis (Mäklin, 1852)
- Gabrius piger Schillhammer, 1997
- Gabrius piliger Mulsant & Rey, 1876
- Gabrius pisciformis (Fauvel, 1874)
- Gabrius planulatus (Sharp, 1885)
- Gabrius platysaurus Hromádka, 2014
- Gabrius plegadis Hromádka, 2014
- Gabrius plumosus Last, 1981
- Gabrius pollux Schillhammer, 2011
- Gabrius potamogale Hromádka, 2014
- Gabrius praedictus Schillhammer, 1997
- Gabrius praesignis Schillhammer, 2001
- Gabrius pravus Assing, 2009
- Gabrius prodotiscus Hromádka, 2014
- Gabrius propinquus (Cameron, 1933)
- Gabrius pseudimitator Schillhammer, 1997
- Gabrius pseudopennatus (Cameron, 1945)
- Gabrius pternistis Hromádka, 2014
- Gabrius pullatus Herman, 2001
- Gabrius punctatellus (Horn, 1884)
- Gabrius puthzi Schillhammer, 1997
- Gabrius pyxicephalus Hromádka, 2014
- Gabrius quadriceps Jarrige, 1978
- Gabrius quadripunctatus Schillhammer, 1992
- Gabrius rabigoides Jarrige, 1957
- Gabrius ramifer Tottenham, 1956
- Gabrius ravasinii Gridelli, 1920
- Gabrius riedeli Schillhammer, 1997
- Gabrius robustus Smetana, 1953
- Gabrius roubali Smetana, 1952
- Gabrius roubalioides Schillhammer, 1997
- Gabrius rougemonti Schillhammer, 1997
- Gabrius rousettus Hromádka, 2014
- Gabrius rudiventris (Bernhauer, 1937)
- Gabrius rufocinctus Schillhammer, 1997
- Gabrius rupicola (Cameron, 1943)
- Gabrius rusticus (Sharp, 1885)
- Gabrius sacerdotalis Joy, 1913
- Gabrius sagittifer Schillhammer, 1997
- Gabrius sallustius Smetana, 1995
- Gabrius satoi Shibata, Y., 2007
- Gabrius schawallerianus Schillhammer, 1997
- Gabrius schillhammeri Shibata, Y., 1996
- Gabrius schmidti Schillhammer, 2000
- Gabrius schoedli Schillhammer, 1997
- Gabrius schwendingeri Schillhammer, 1997
- Gabrius scrutandus Schillhammer, 1997
- Gabrius seattlensis (Hatch, 1957)
- Gabrius semipunctatus Stephens, 1833
- Gabrius senegalensis Cameron, 1950
- Gabrius separatus (Cameron, 1950)
- Gabrius septempunctatus (Cameron, 1930)
- Gabrius serinus Hromádka, 2014
- Gabrius serpens (Sharp, 1885)
- Gabrius serpentis Schillhammer, 1997
- Gabrius settei Schillhammer, 2013
- Gabrius sexualis Smetana, 1954
- Gabrius sharpianus (Cameron, 1930)
- Gabrius shulli (Hatch, 1957)
- Gabrius siamensis Schillhammer, 1997
- Gabrius simulans (Wollaston, 1857)
- Gabrius smetanai Schillhammer, 1997
- Gabrius solomonicus Schillhammer, 1997
- Gabrius spatulipenis Schillhammer, 1997
- Gabrius sphagnicola (Sjöberg, 1950)
- Gabrius splendidulus (Gravenhorst, 1802)
- Gabrius sterna Hromádka, 2014
- Gabrius sternula Hromádka, 2014
- Gabrius stipes Sharp, 1910
- Gabrius streptopelia Hromádka, 2014
- Gabrius subdepressus (Bernhauer, 1939)
- Gabrius subdolus Schillhammer, 2001
- Gabrius submetallicus (Cameron, 1933)
- Gabrius submolestus Schillhammer, 2001
- Gabrius subnigritulus Joy, 1913
- Gabrius successorius Schillhammer, 1997
- Gabrius suffragani Joy, 1913
- Gabrius tachybaptus Hromádka, 2014
- Gabrius tadorna Hromádka, 2014
- Gabrius taiwanensis Schillhammer, 2001
- Gabrius talangensis Schillhammer, 1997
- Gabrius taphozous Hromadka, 2011
- Gabrius taplejungensis Schillhammer, 1997
- Gabrius tarasovi Schillhammer, 2011
- Gabrius tenganominus Tottenham, 1962
- Gabrius thailandicus Schillhammer, 1997
- Gabrius thalasseus Hromádka, 2014
- Gabrius thermicola (Cameron, 1947)
- Gabrius tilakholensis Schillhammer, 1997
- Gabrius tirolensis (Luze, 1903)
- Gabrius tokatensis Smetana, 1977
- Gabrius tolkieni Schillhammer, 1997
- Gabrius tornus Joy, 1913
- Gabrius tortilis Li, Liang, Schillhammer & Hong-Zhang Zhou, 2010
- Gabrius toxotes Joy, 1913
- Gabrius trapezipennis Schillhammer, 2001
- Gabrius trifidus Schillhammer, 1992
- Gabrius trigonalis Tottenham, 1956
- Gabrius trossuliformis Schillhammer, 1999
- Gabrius trossuloides (Cameron, 1933)
- Gabrius trossulus (Nordmann, 1837)
- Gabrius tsaratananus Jarrige, 1970
- Gabrius tucumanensis (Bernhauer, 1927)
- Gabrius turcmenus (Fauvel, 1900)
- Gabrius uedai Hayashi, Y., 2021
- Gabrius ulpius Smetana, 1995
- Gabrius ultimus Schillhammer, 1997
- Gabrius unculus Tottenham, 1956
- Gabrius unzenensis (Bernhauer, 1939)
- Gabrius ussuriensis Schillhammer, 1991
- Gabrius velox Sharp, 1910
- Gabrius ventralis Stephens, 1833
- Gabrius vibius Smetana, 1995
- Gabrius vicinus (Cameron, 1932)
- Gabrius victoriae Schillhammer, 2018
- Gabrius viduus (Cameron, 1933)
- Gabrius vindex Smetana, 1995
- Gabrius virilis (Horn, 1884)
- Gabrius visokeanus (Cameron, 1950)
- Gabrius vulcanicola Schillhammer, 1997
- Gabrius vulcanus (Cameron, 1950)
- Gabrius xanthipes Schillhammer, 1997
- Gabrius yaanensis Li, Liang, Schillhammer & Hong-Zhang Zhou, 2010
- Gabrius yakinius Tottenham, 1956
- Gabrius yamanei Smetana, 1984
- Gabrius zerchei Schillhammer, 1996
- Gabrius zhaoi Li, Liang, Schillhammer & Hong-Zhang Zhou, 2010
- Gabrius zhoui Li, Liang, Schillhammer & Hong-Zhang Zhou, 2012
