= Sofia Zoo =

- A crowned elephant, the symbol of Sofia Zoo
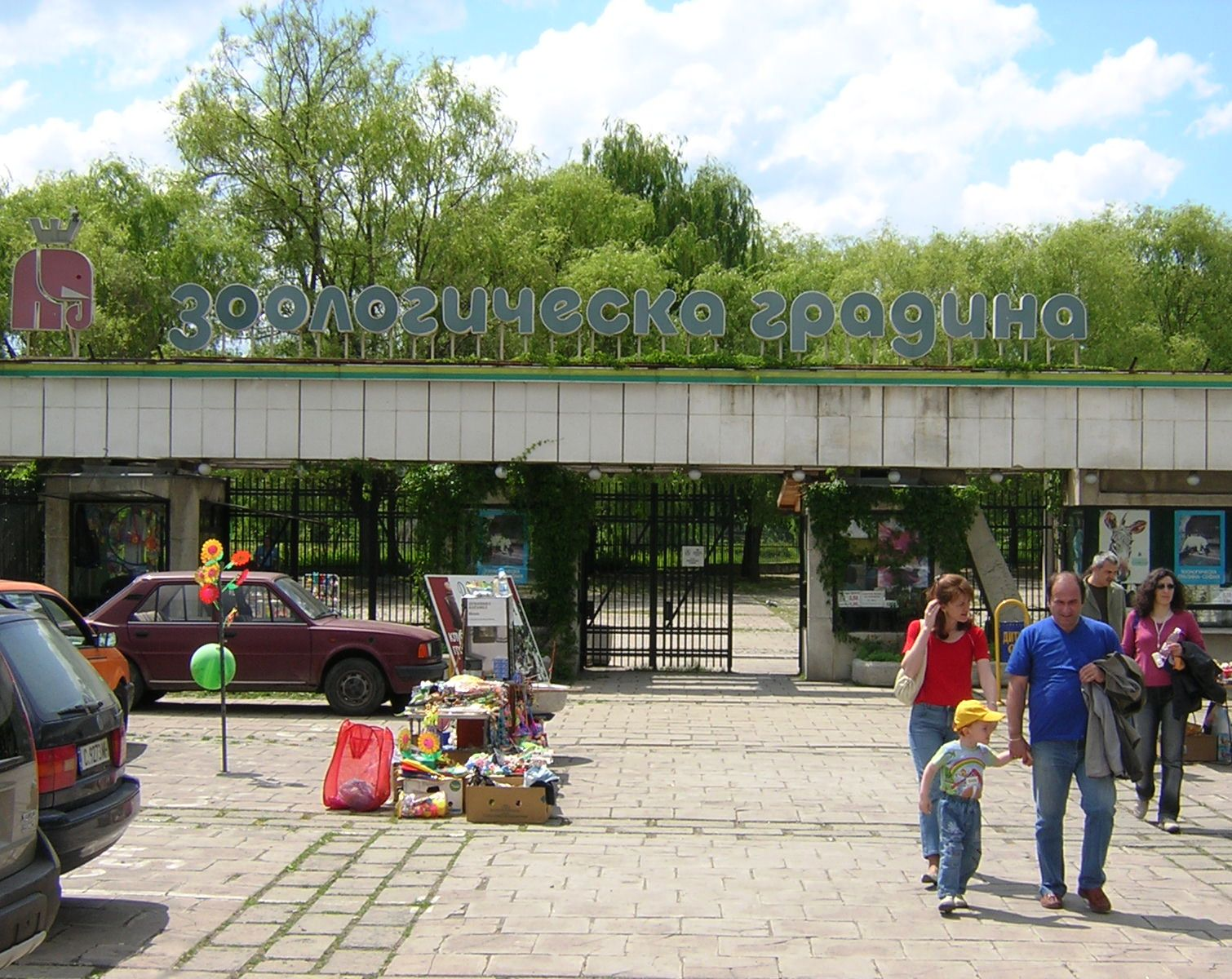
- The eastern entrance
- Interactive map of Sofia Zoo
- 42°39′29″N 23°19′55″E
- Date opened: 1888
- Location: Sofia, Bulgaria
- Land area: 36 ha (89 acres)
- No. of animals: 1,100
- No. of species: 200+
- Annual visitors: 500,000
- Director: Ar. Dobromir Borislavov
- Public transit: Bus: 64, 66, 67, 68, 83, 88, 98, 102, 120, 288, 805
- Website: www.zoosofia.eu

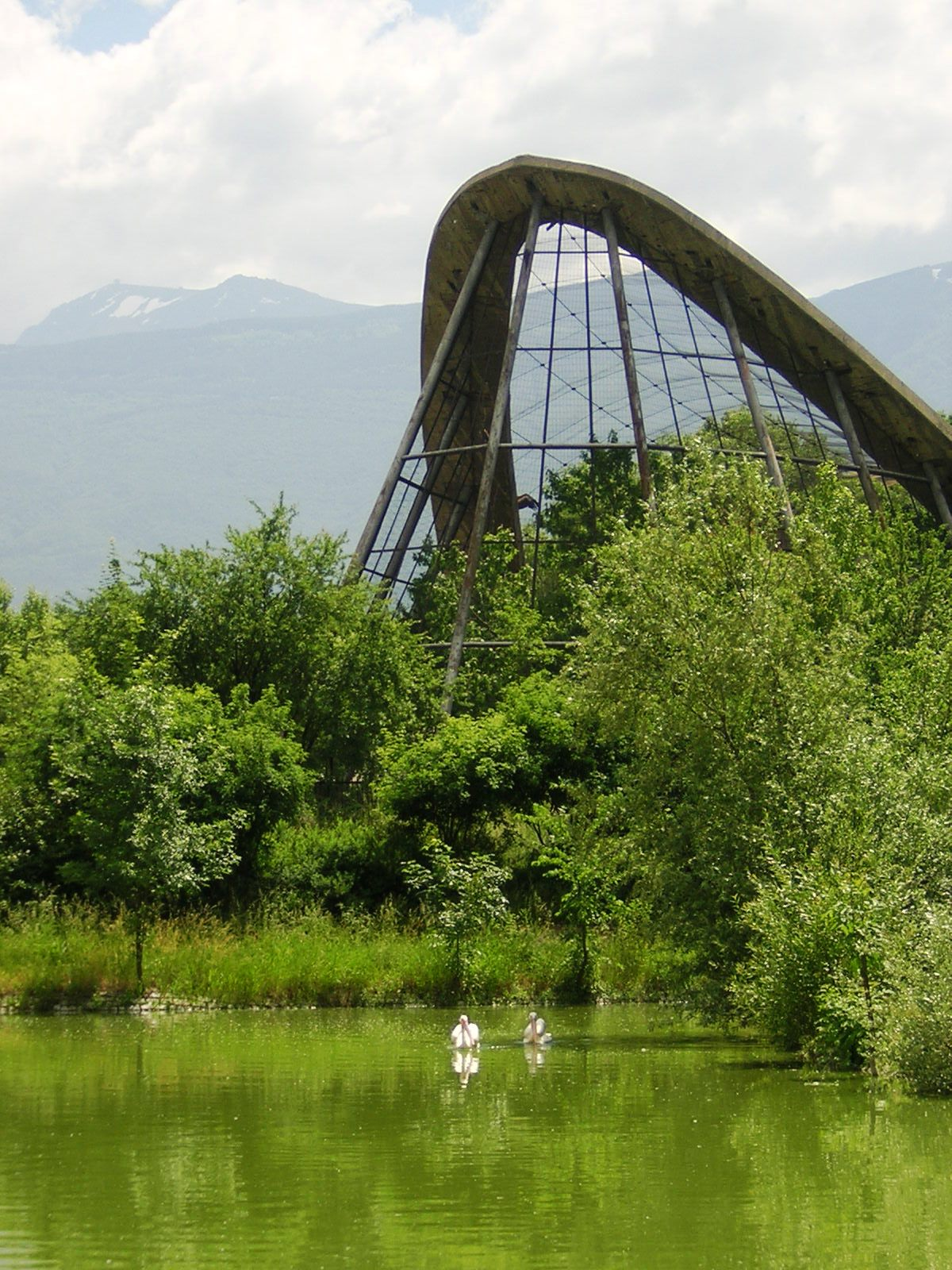
Aviary and pelican pond

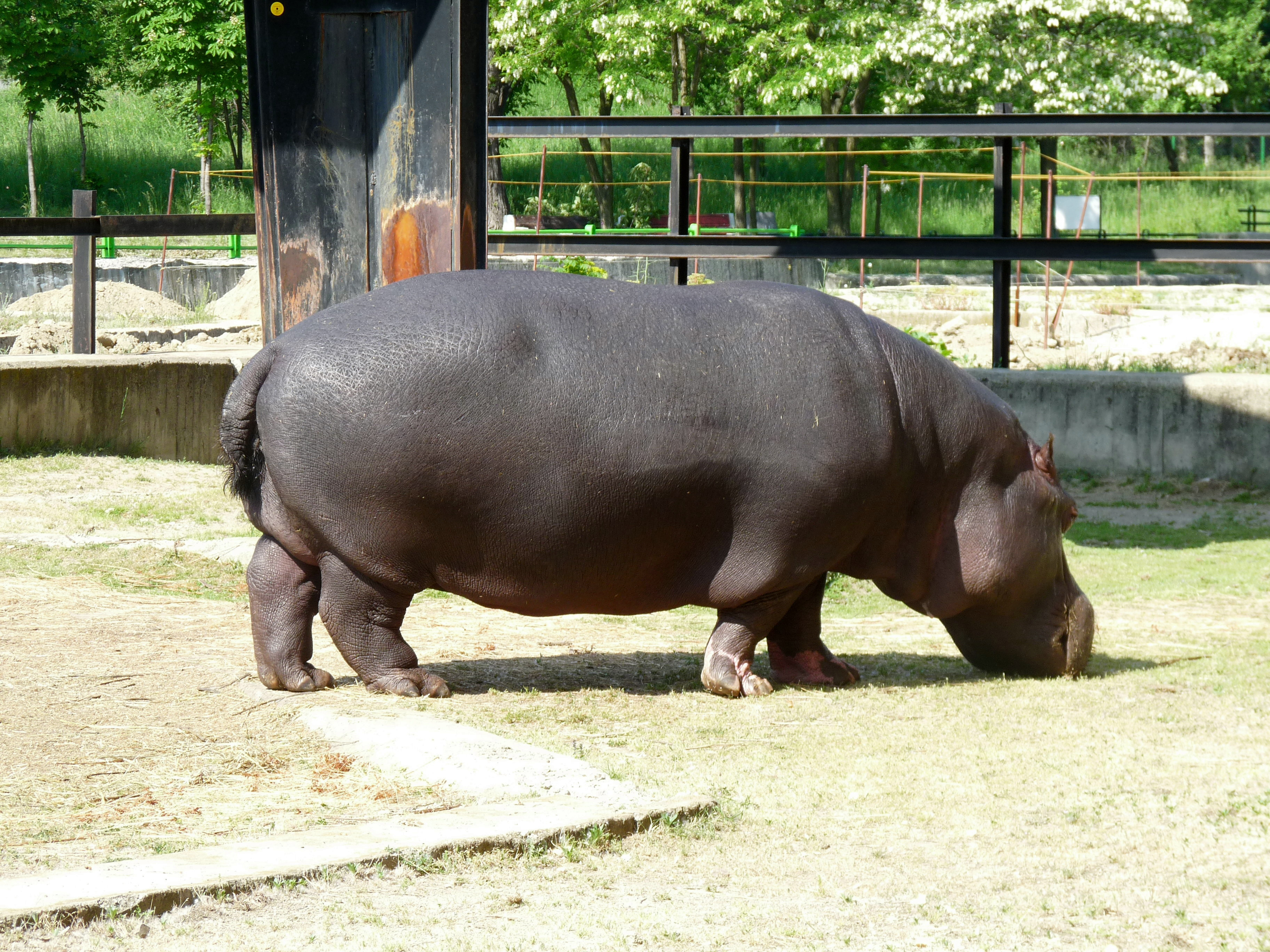
Norman the hippo at the zoo

Sofia Zoo in Sofia, the capital of Bulgaria, was founded by royal decree on 1 May 1888, and is the oldest and largest zoological garden in Southeast Europe. It covers 36 hectares (89 acres), and, in March 2006, housed 4,850 animals representing 840 species. In 2025 it hosted about 2000 animals from 280 different species. As of October 2026, it hosts 200 species including 51 that are considered endangered.

The ticket pricing in 2026 charges visitors aged 3-18, students, pensioners and disabled persons 2,56 EUR, and visitors over 18 years old 5,11 EUR. Children under 3 may visit free of charge.

== History ==
Initially, the zoo was located in the park of the former royal palace, with the primary attraction being a Eurasian black vulture caught in Bulgaria and exhibited in a cage in the garden. Later, pheasants and deer were added to the collection, but since the exhibits and facilities of the time proved inadequate to accommodate a pair of brown bears, Tsar Ferdinand of Bulgaria ordered a grant of land to be awarded to Sofia Zoo on the grounds of the former botanical garden, then in the outskirts of the city.

Sofia Zoo's exhibition of animals constantly increased, with both local and foreign species being added, most notably a pair of lions in 1892, which were housed in a former stable and a lion cub was born the same year.

Between 1893 and 1895, new cages and buildings were constructed to accommodate the ever-increasing collection of birds and mammals, including a solid three-room stone building in the back of the terrain designed to be inhabited by bears (1894), a pool where a few pink-backed pelicans lived, a building to accommodate pheasants and another one for eagles (1895).

Sofia Zoo moved from its original (and smaller) location in the centre of the city to a new 36-hectare (89-acre) site about 4.5 kilometres (2.8 mi) south of Sofia in 1982.

In April 2023, it was announced that Sofia Zoo had become a member of the European Association of Zoos and Aquaria (EAZA). Due to the zoo's entry into EAZA, they now "will gain new quotas for obtaining animals, new opportunities for exchanging animals with other zoos, access to foreign experience, participation in international programs for conservation and breeding of over 400 rare and endangered species, the most modern training and professional development for zoo specialists, and access to an online platform for sharing knowledge and experience."

== Exhibits ==
Grazing animals

The zoo formerly had some 80 individuals representing 20 grazing species, including white rhinos, hippopotamus, elephant, zebras, antelopes, banteng, water buffaloes, red deer, ibex, wild boar, Bactrian camels, and American bison.

Primates

Primates are housed in two pavilions. The zoo formerly had 93 individuals representing 19 species, including ring-tailed lemurs, hamadryas baboons, common marmoset, and macaques.

Predators

The predator sector houses big cats, bears and small predators, including lions, tigers, leopards, pumas and brown bears.

Penguins

In January 2011 the zoo received eight Humboldt penguins on loan from Germany. The penguins were on loan for about 18 months. Afterward they were returned, with any offspring staying at the zoo.

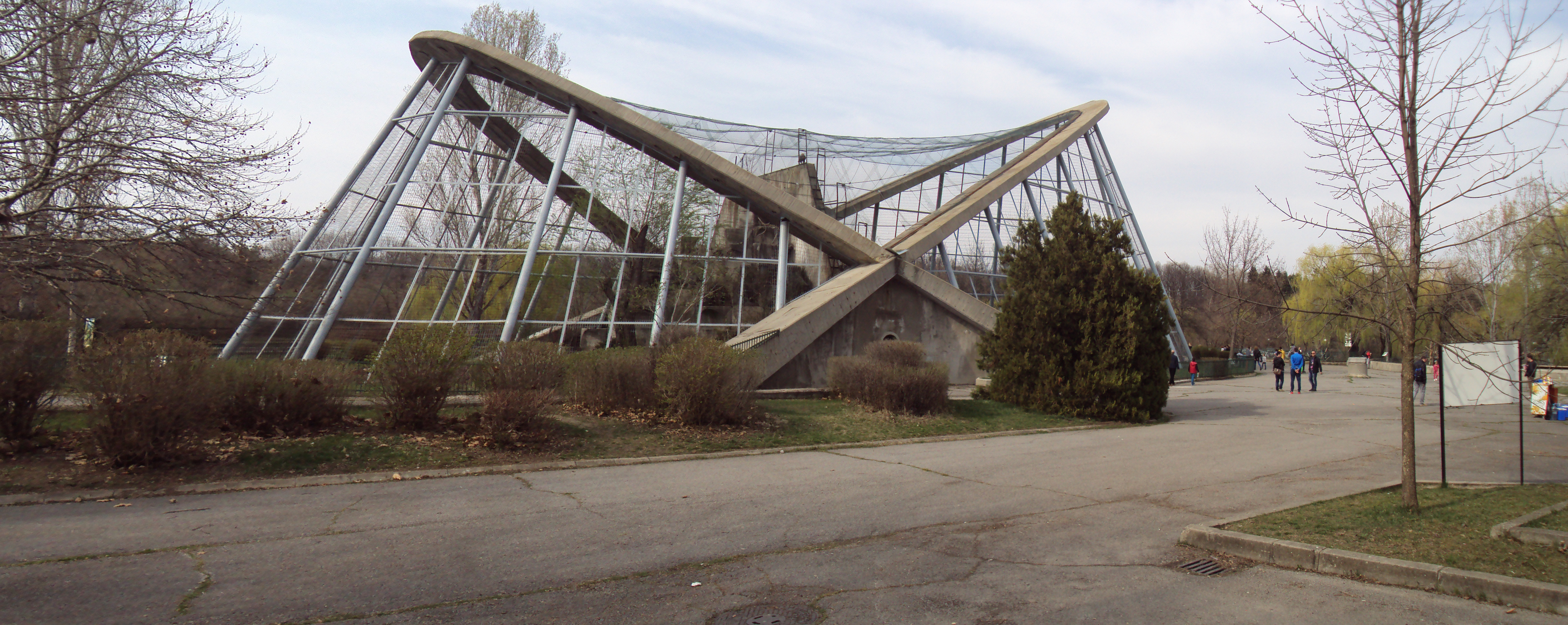
Eagle's cage

Birds

The zoo formerly had some 1,400 individual birds representing 192 species. Waterbirds are housed in a 1.5-hectare (3.7-acre) lake, and Imperial eagles, Griffon vultures, Egyptian vultures and buzzards in a large walk-through aviary. Other species of birds at the zoo include ostriches, Silver pheasants, peacocks, flamingos, blue-and-yellow macaws, owls, cockatoos and cockatiels.

== Other facilities ==
The zoo's veterinary clinic includes a separate entrance and is accessible to the public without entry to the zoo.

== Incidents ==
In 2009, the central heating at the zoo was shut down because the gas supply into the country was stopped by Russia due to a pricing dispute. About a third of the 1,300 animals at the zoo were vulnerable to the resulting cold and employees had to find portable electric and oil heaters to heat their enclosures.

== Gallery ==
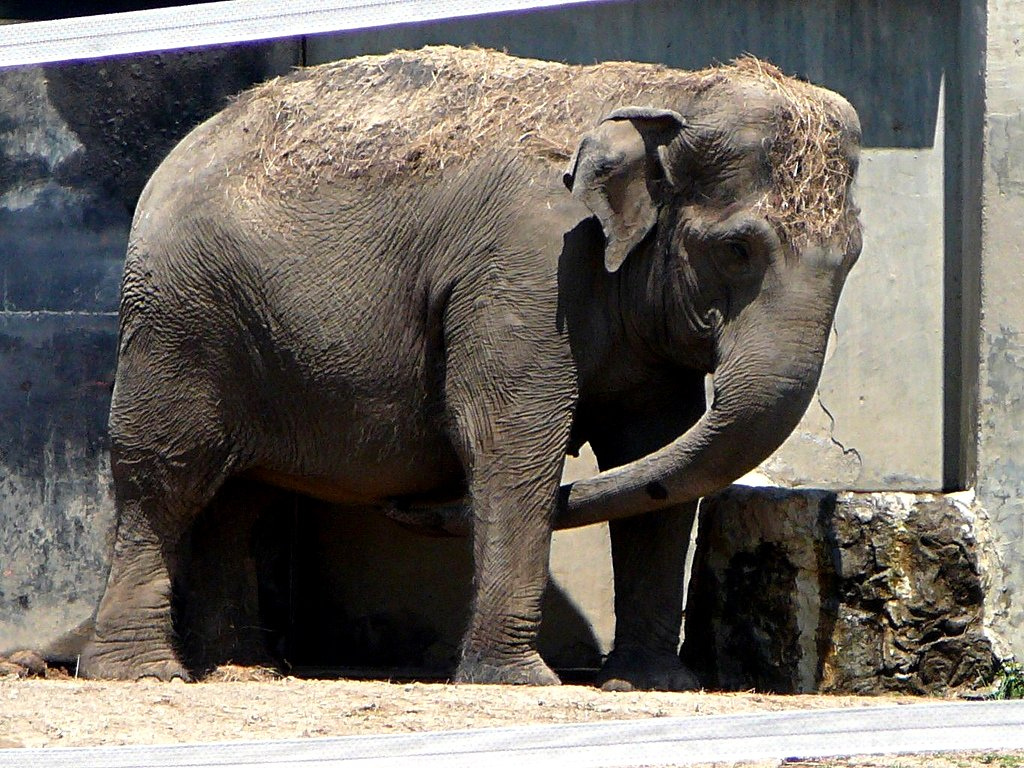

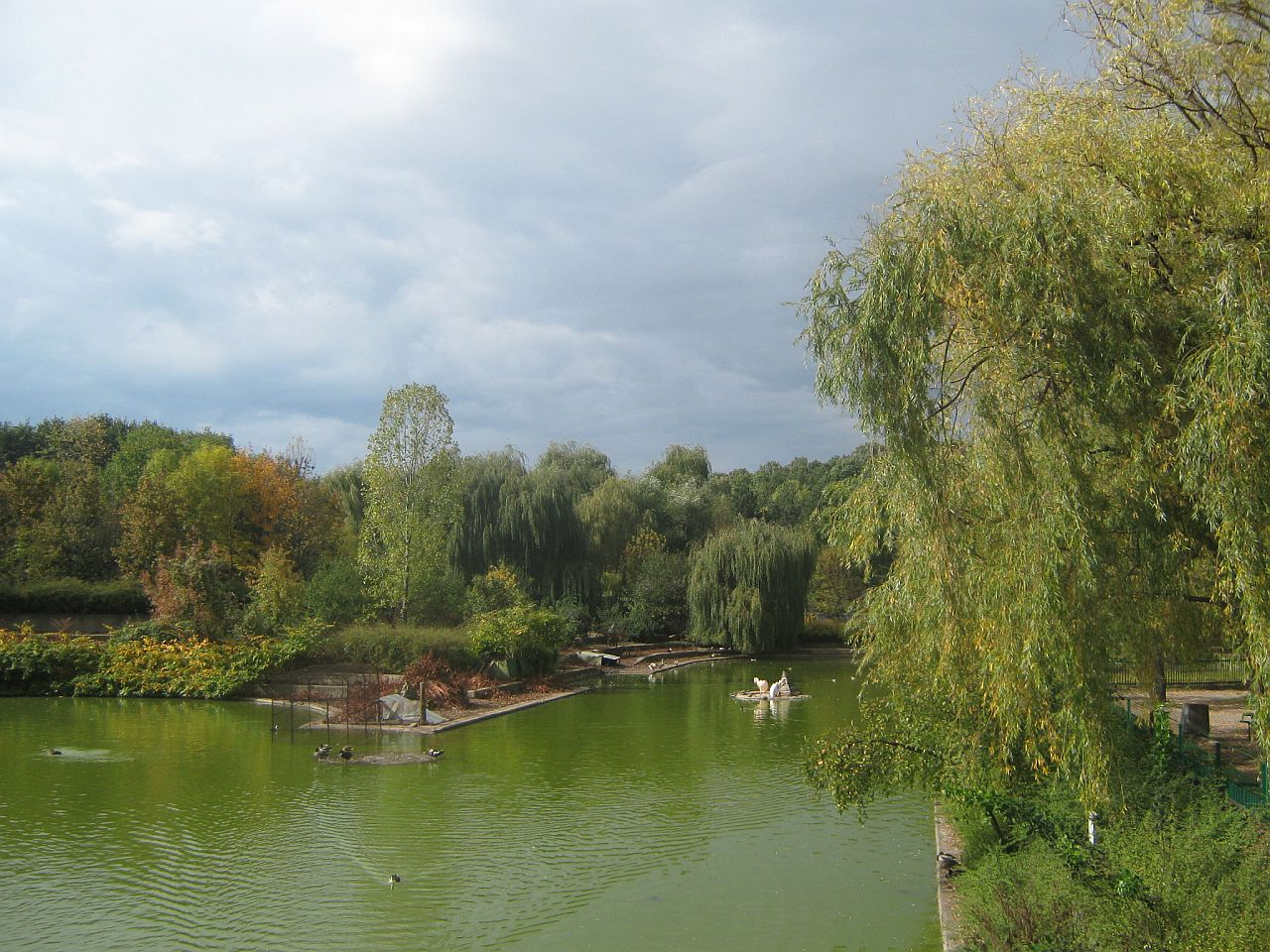

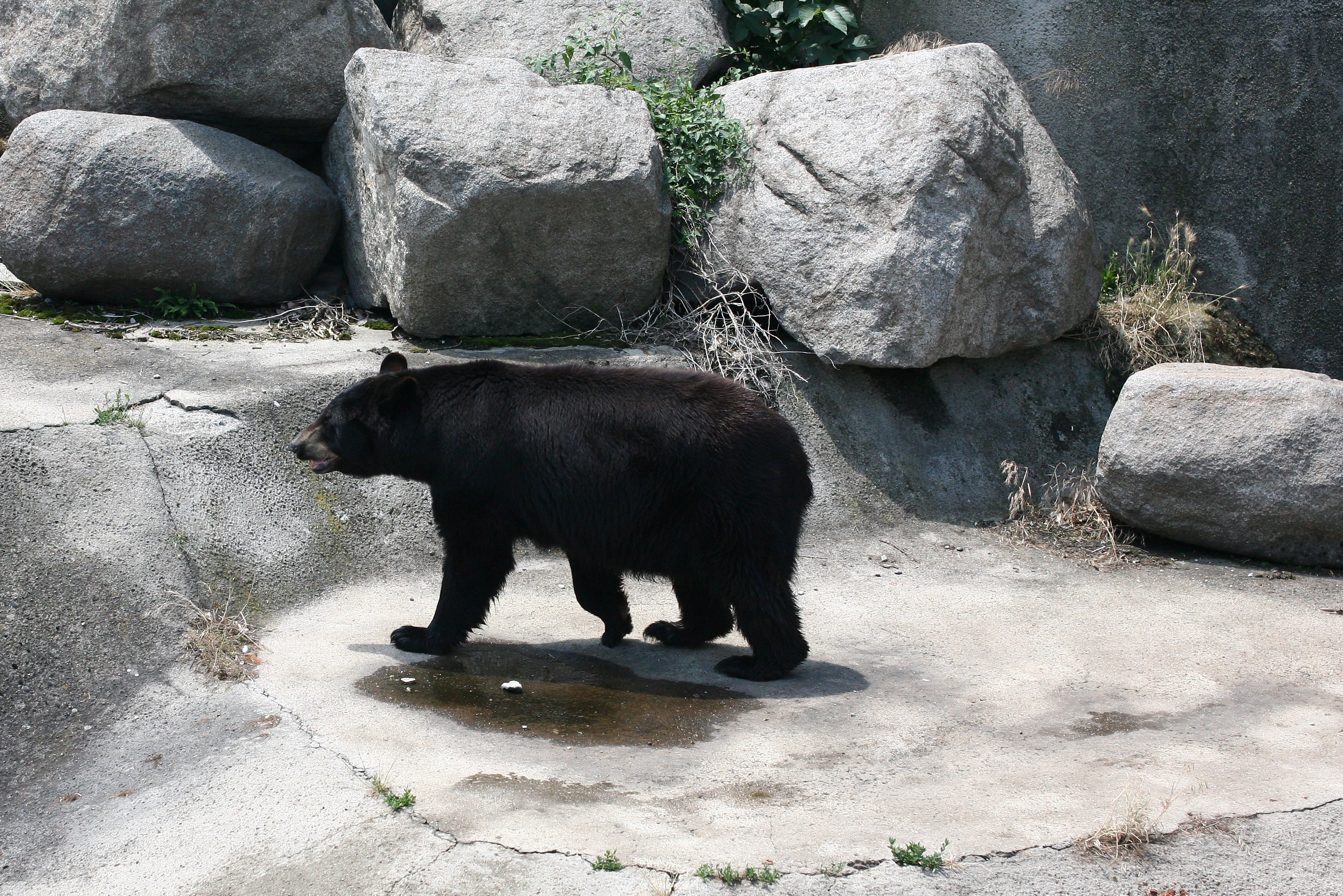

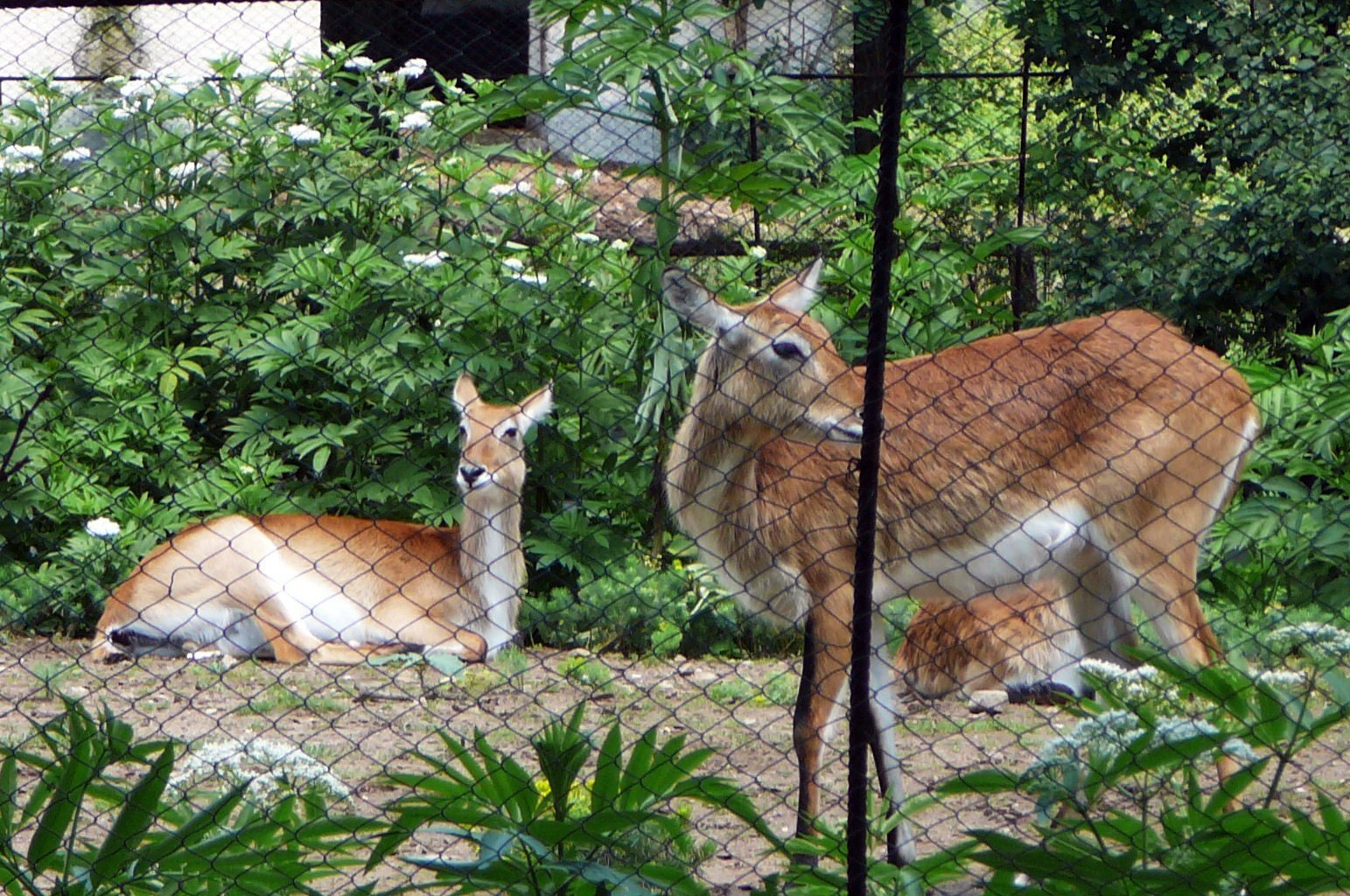

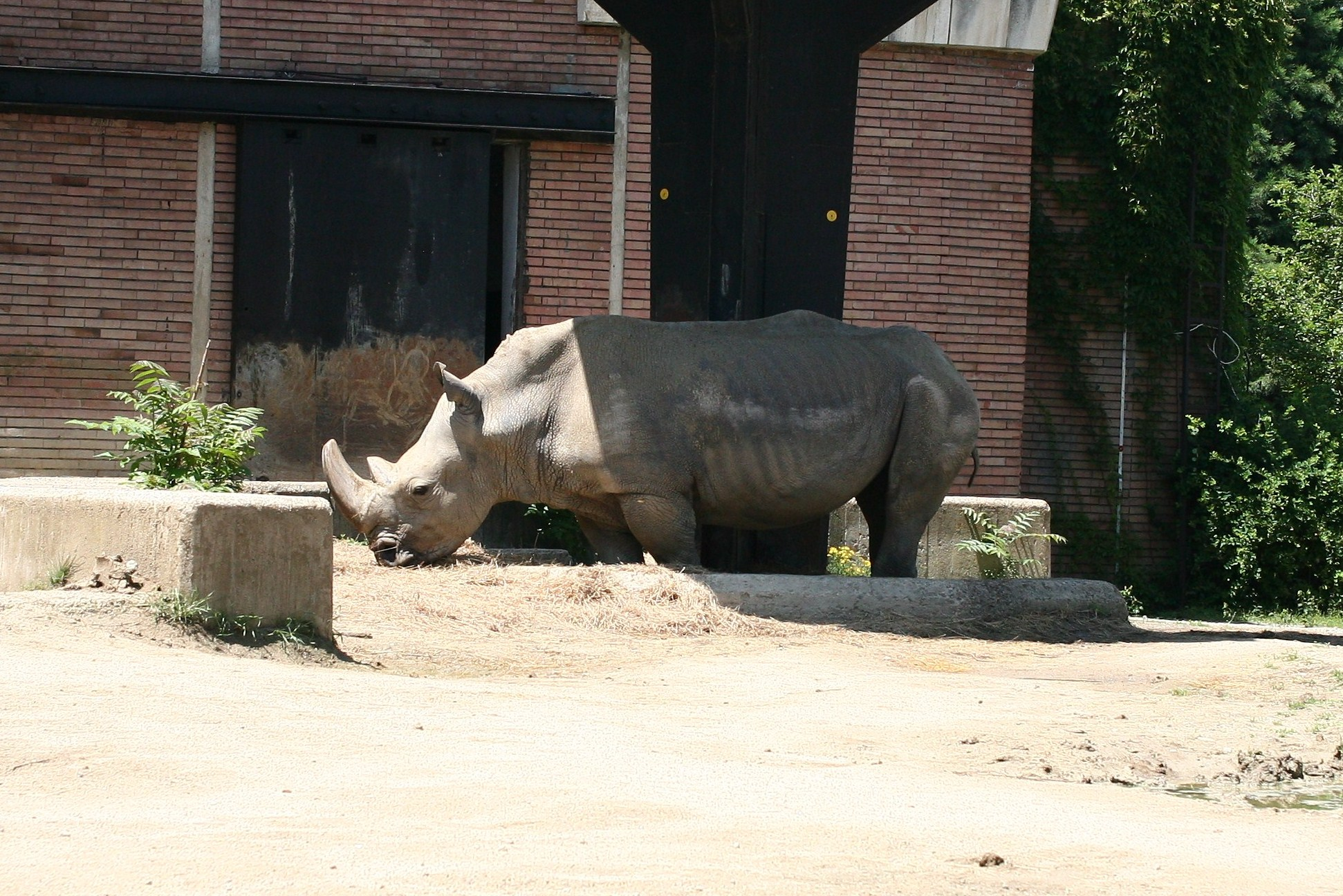

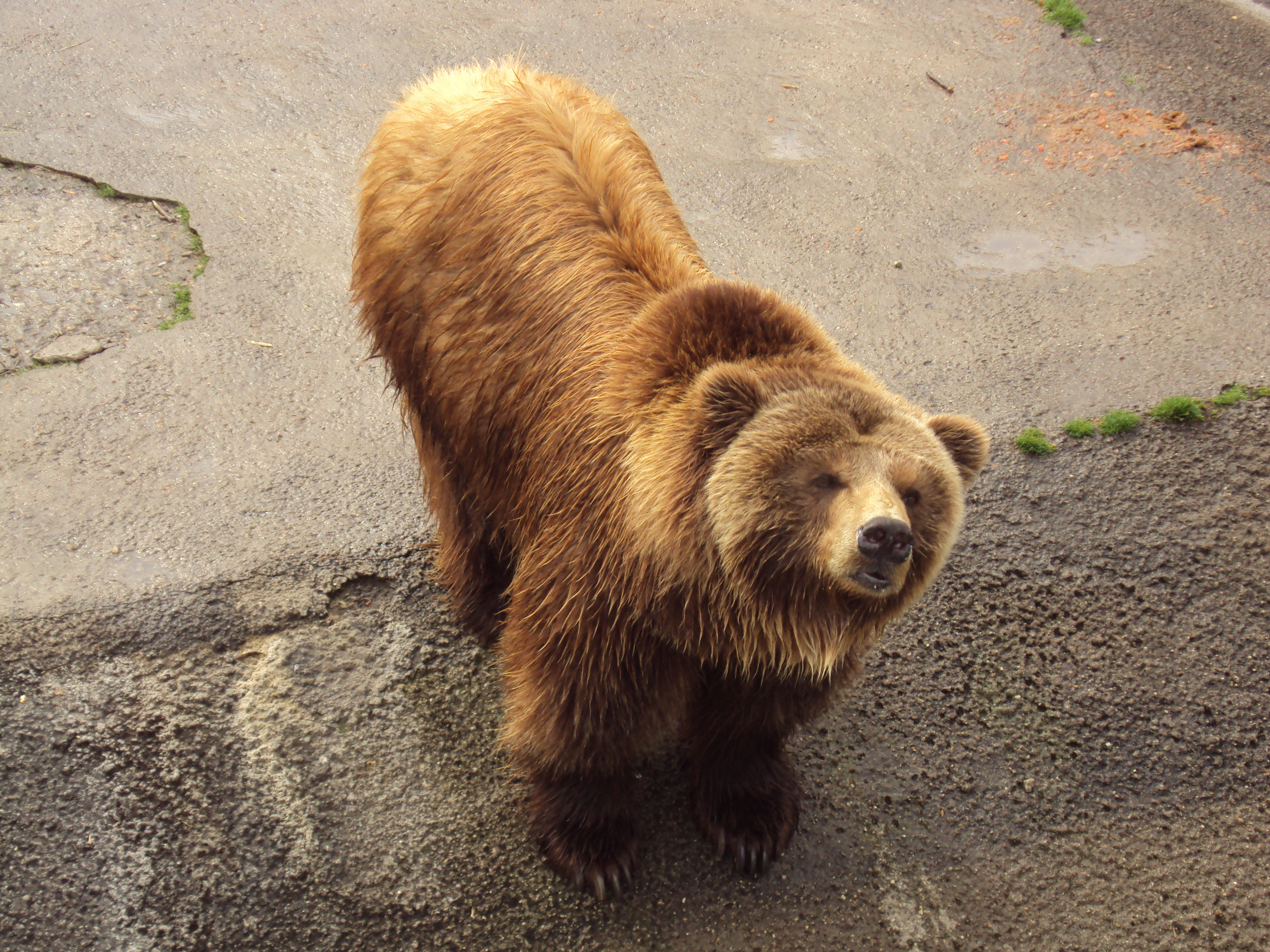

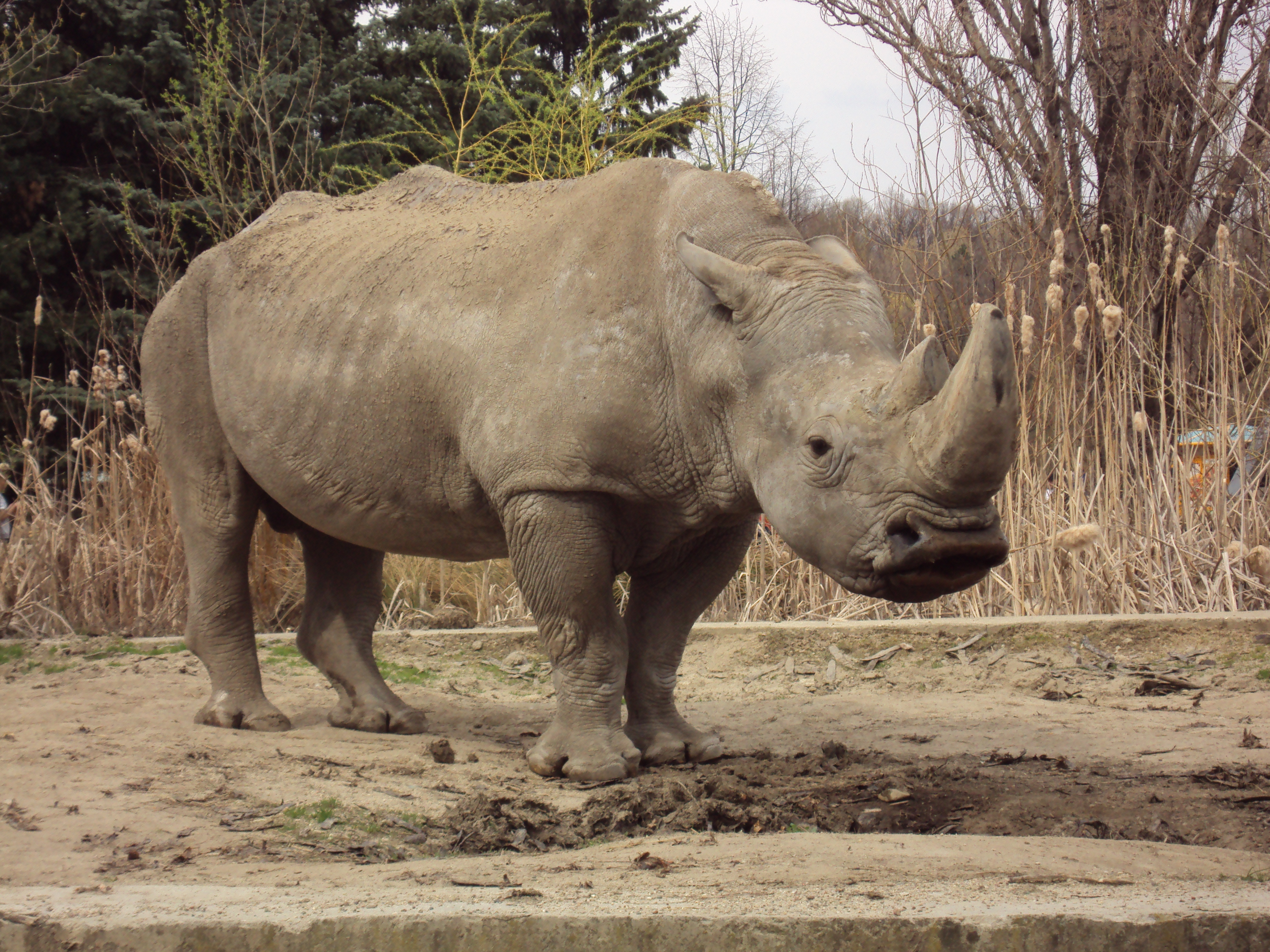

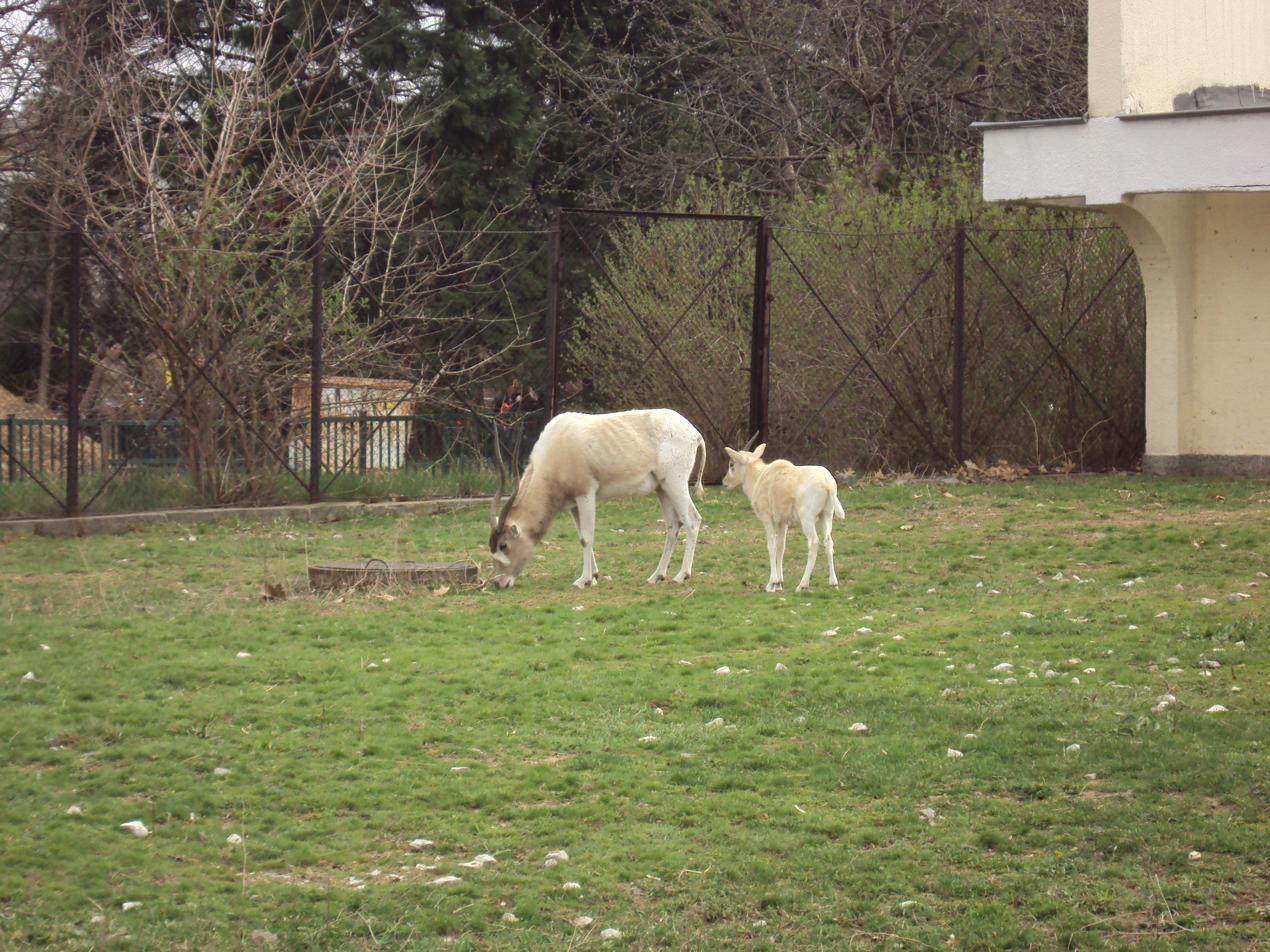

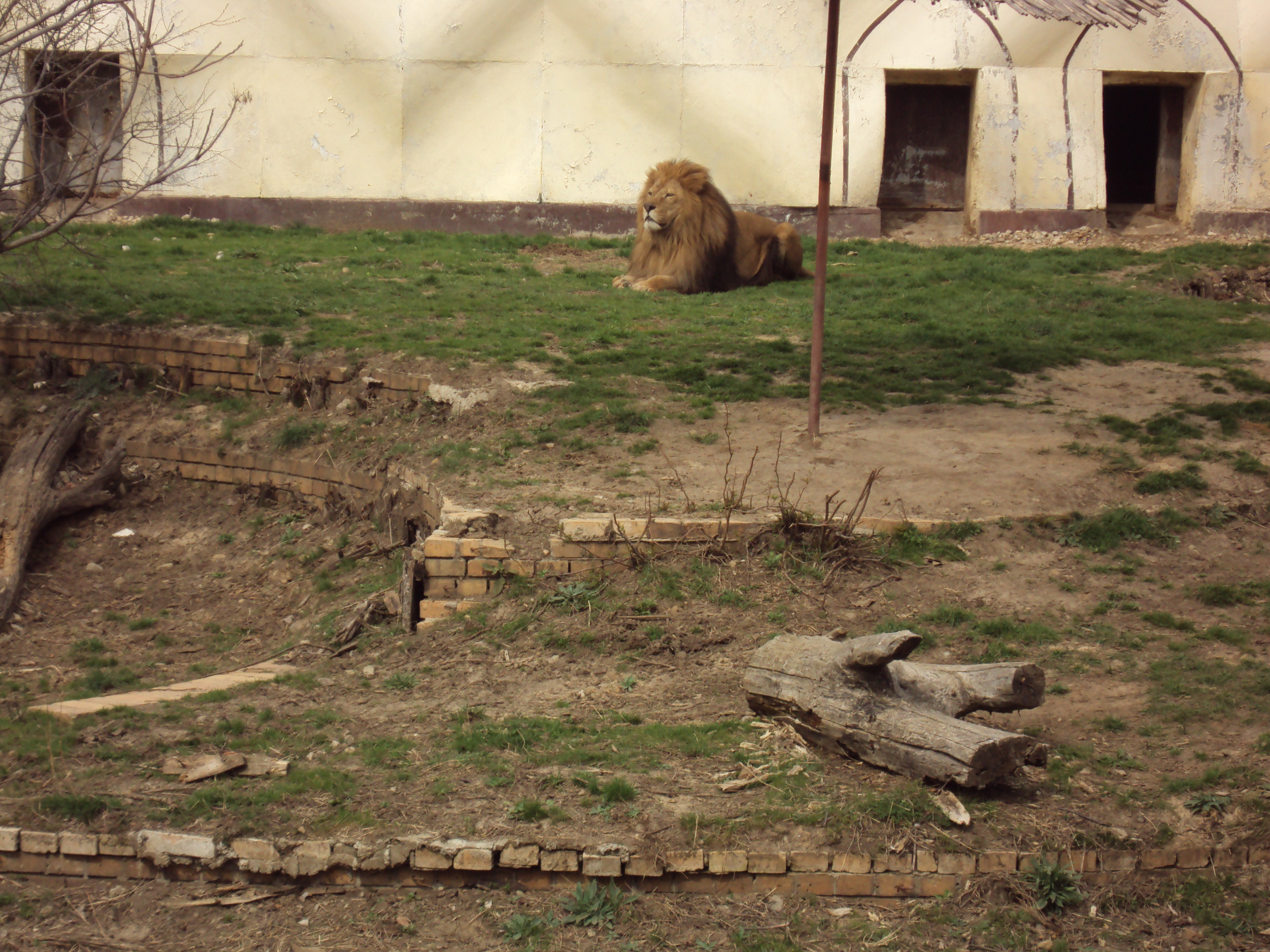

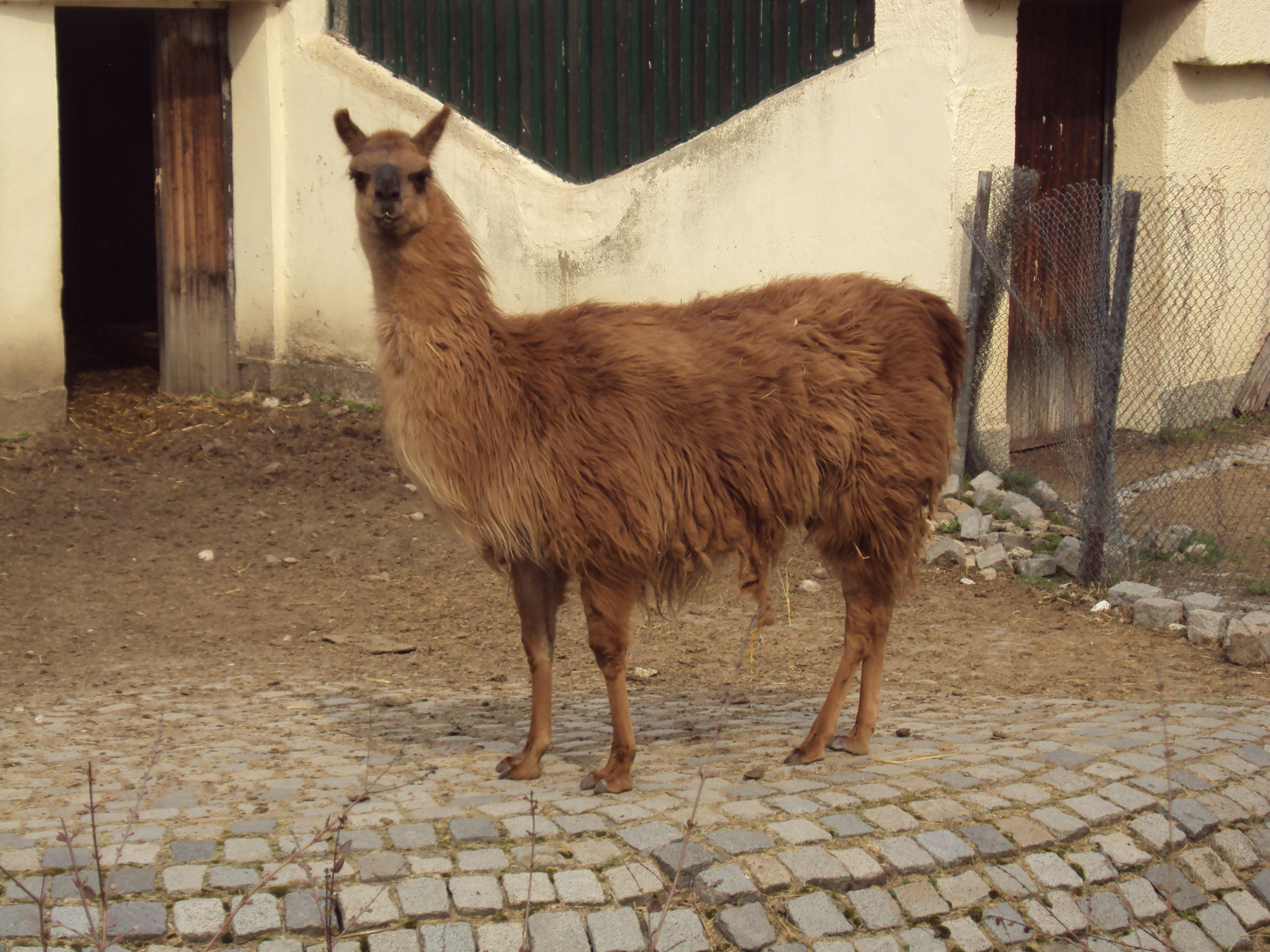

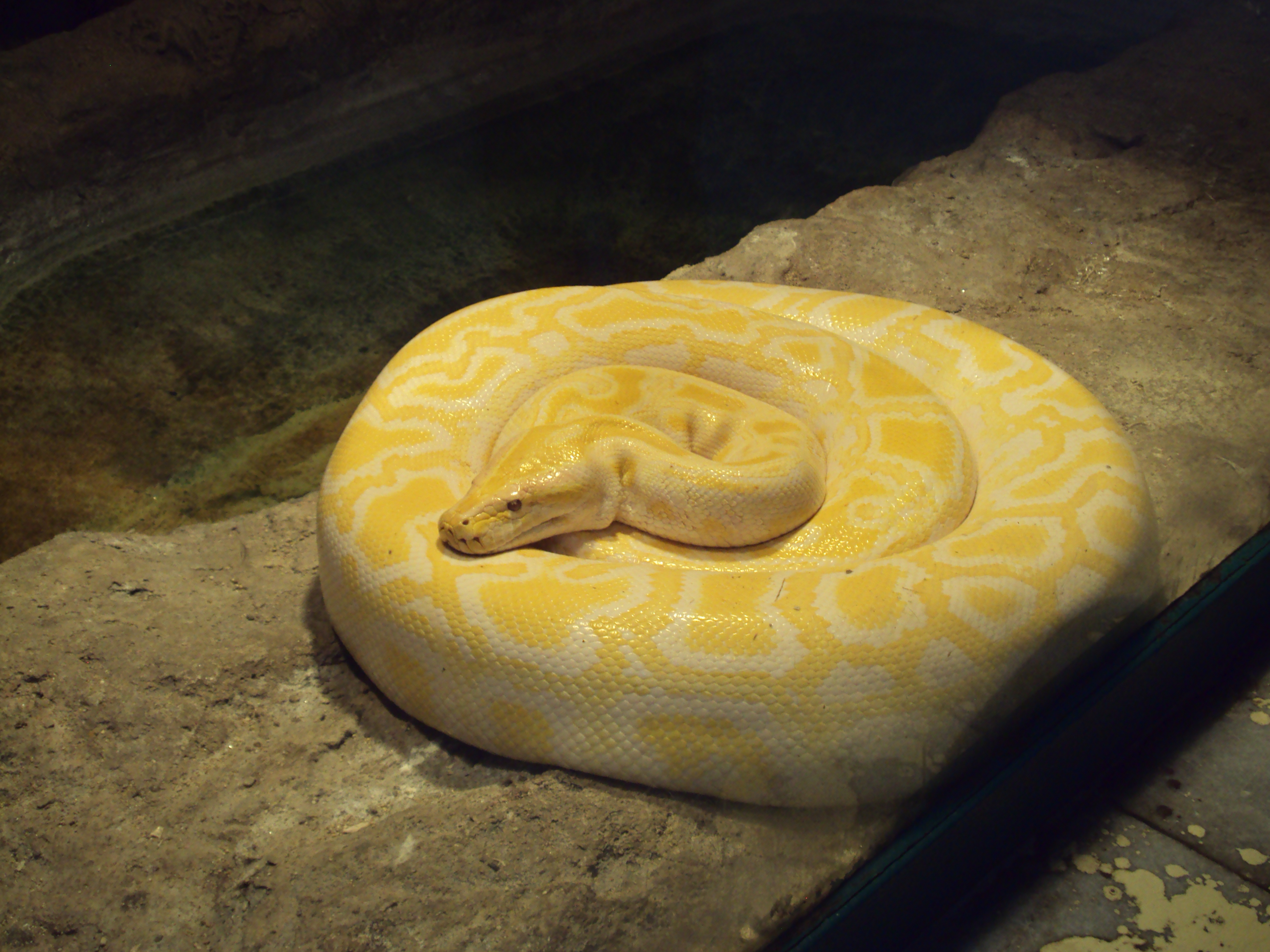

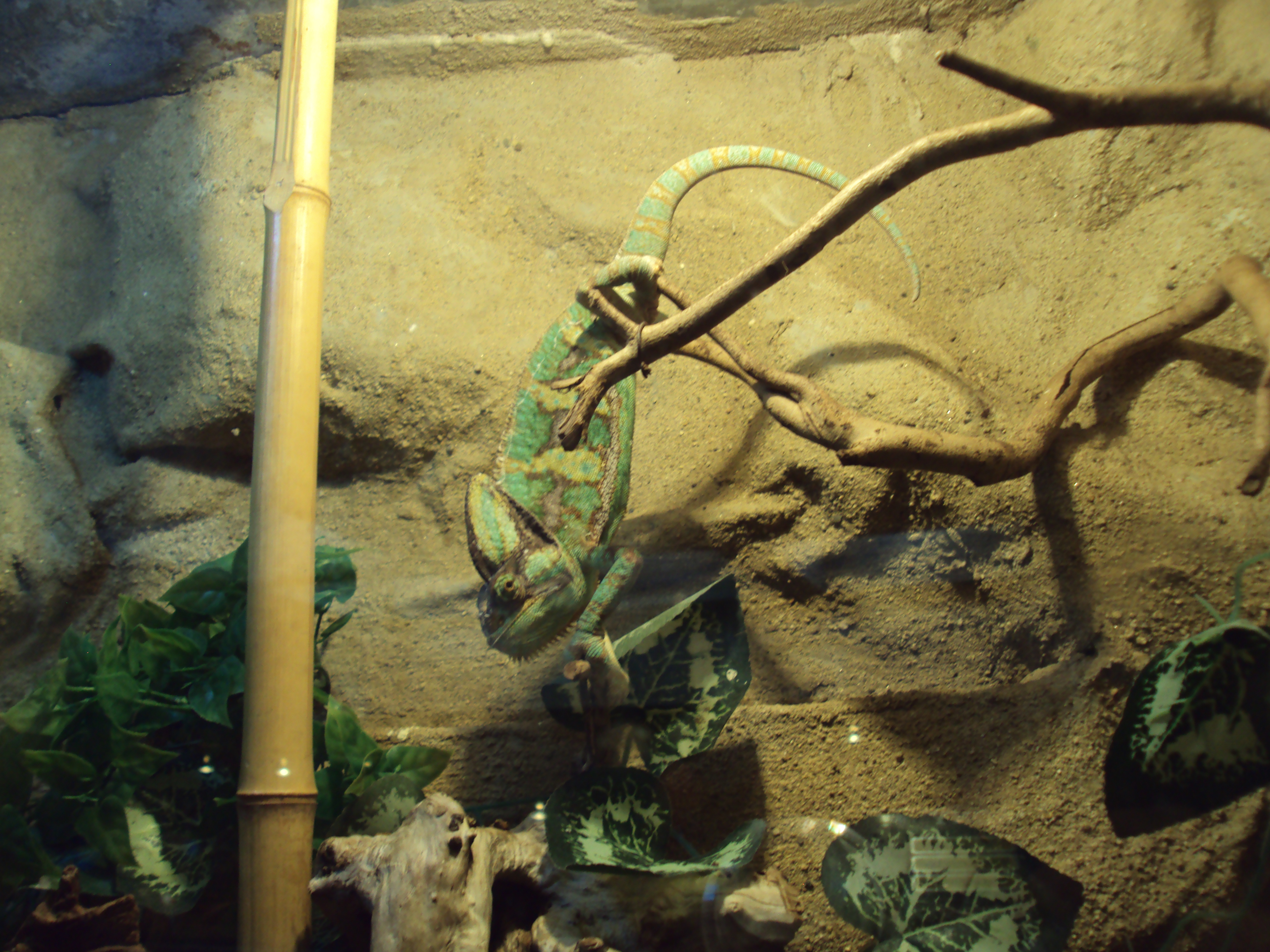

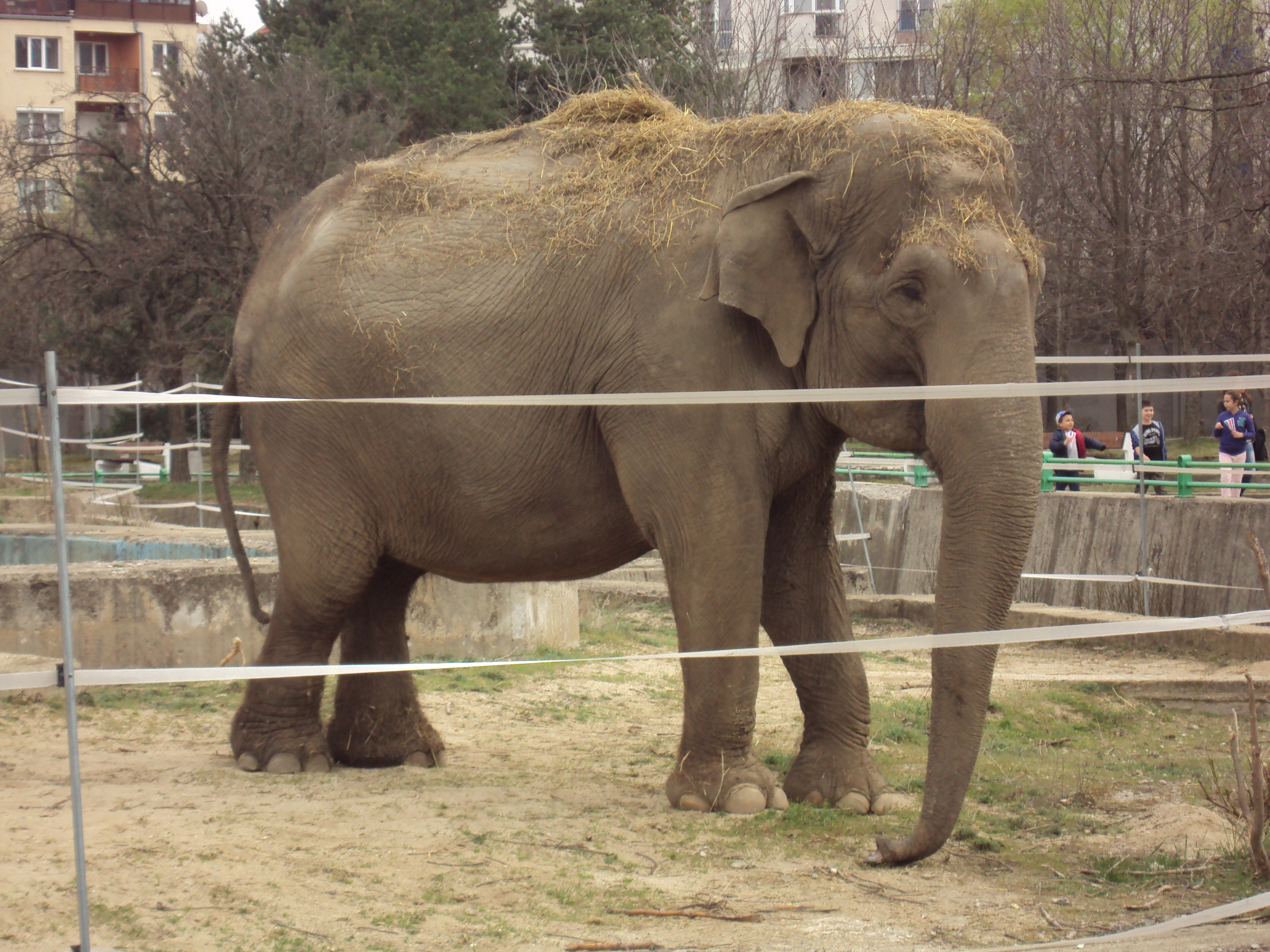

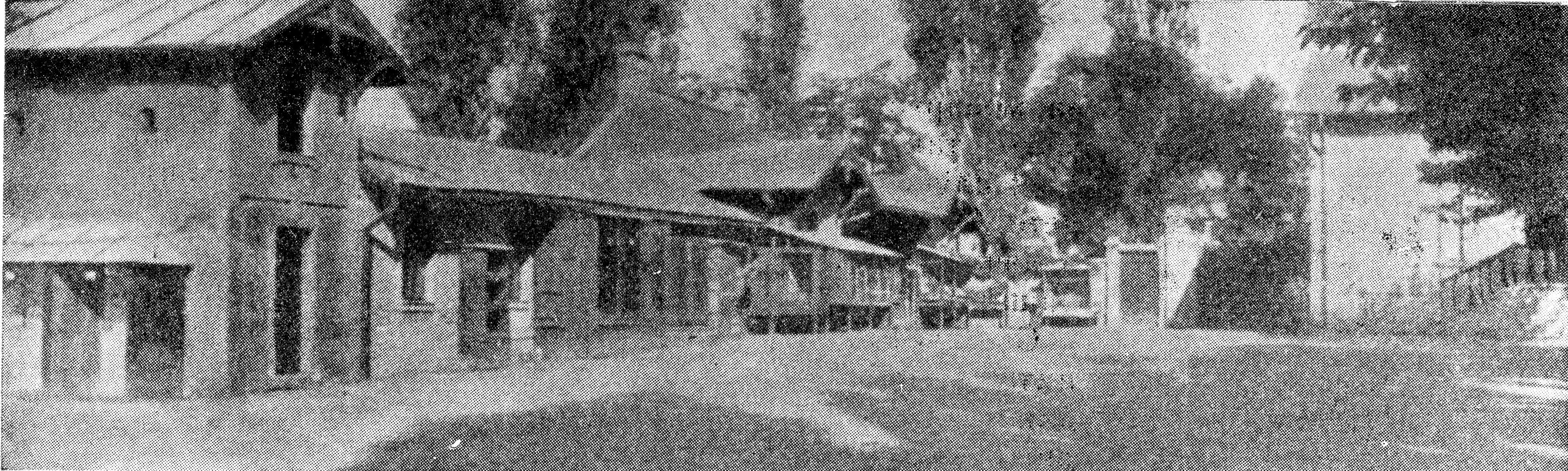

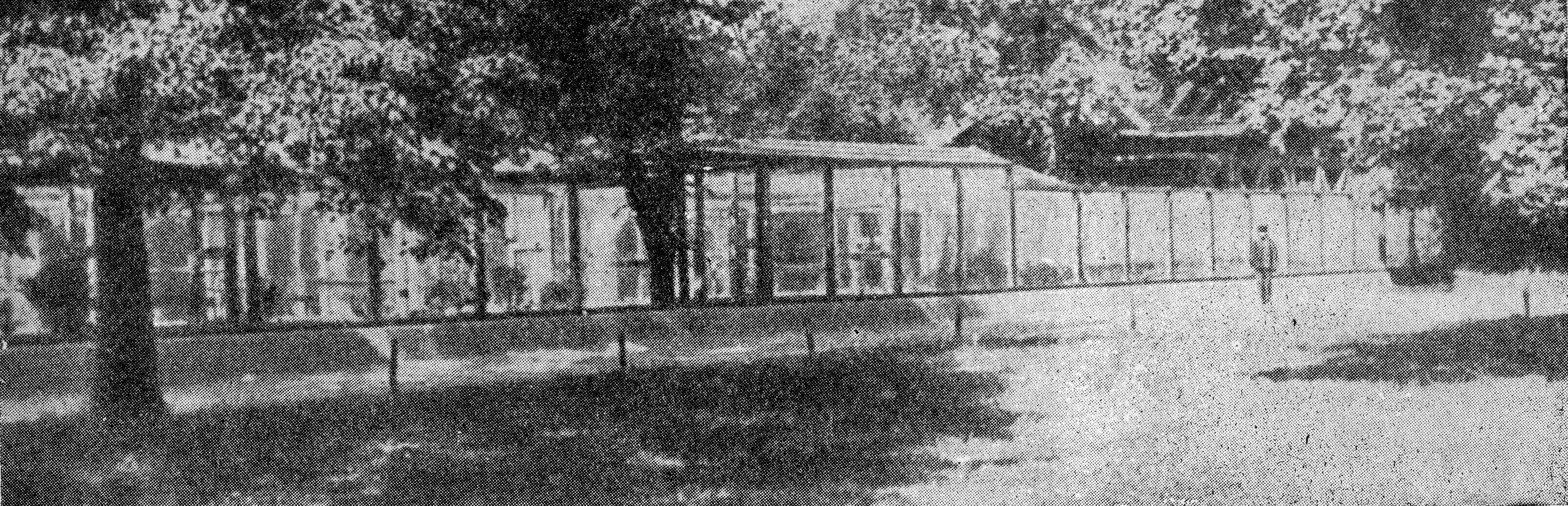

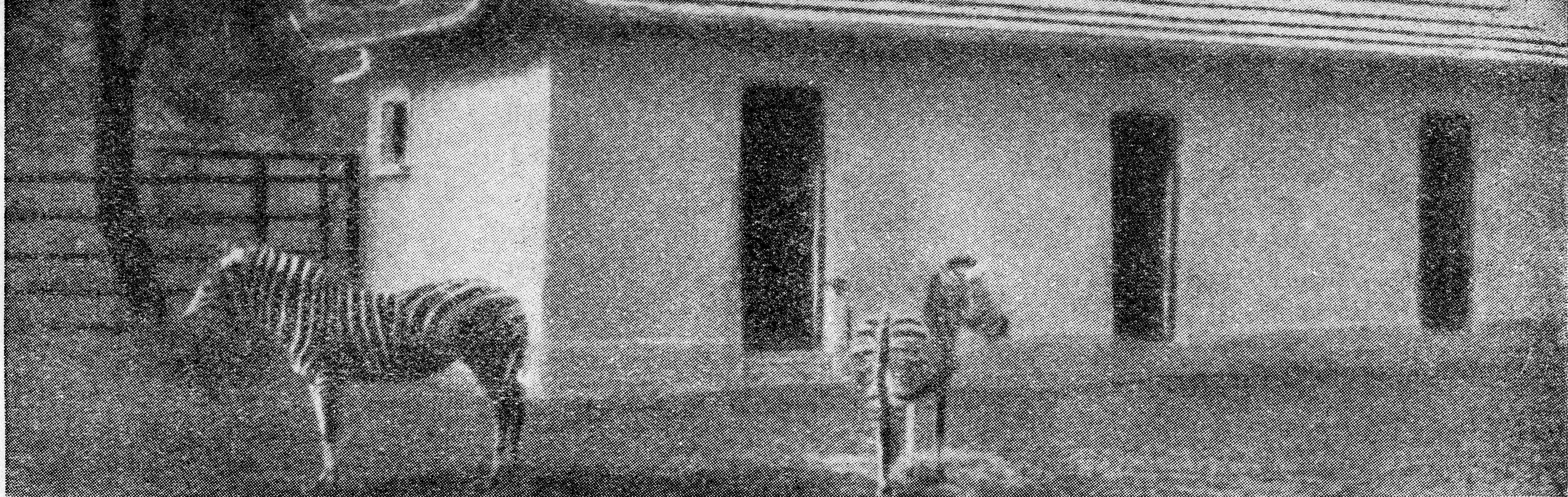

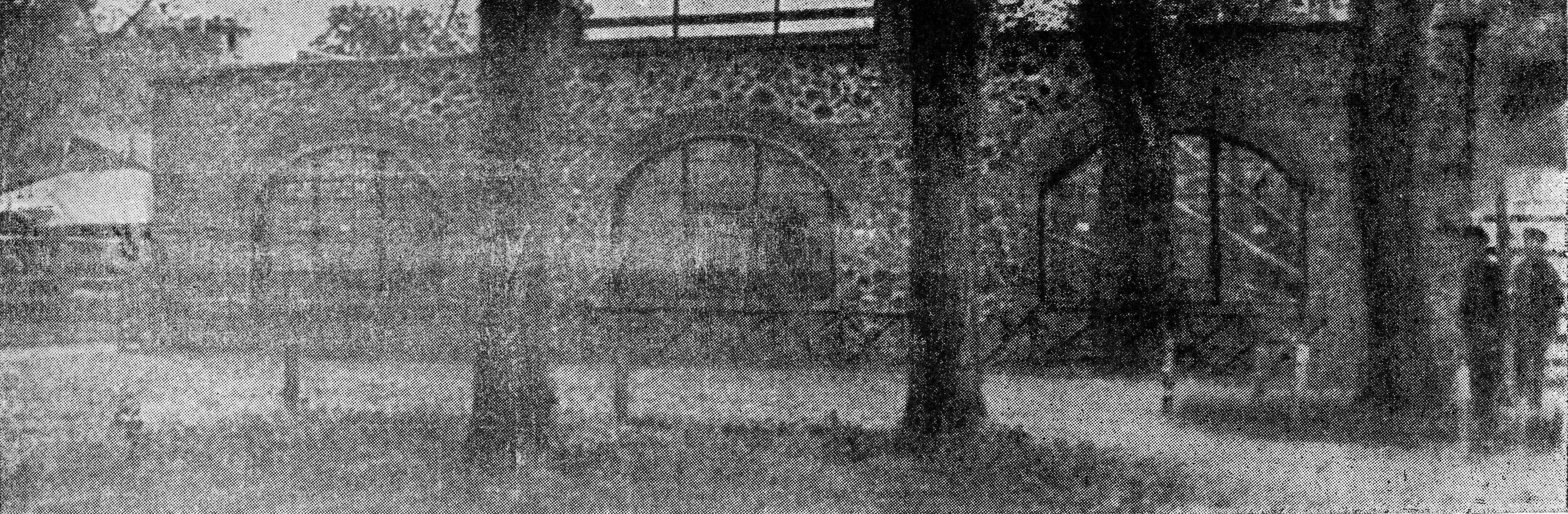

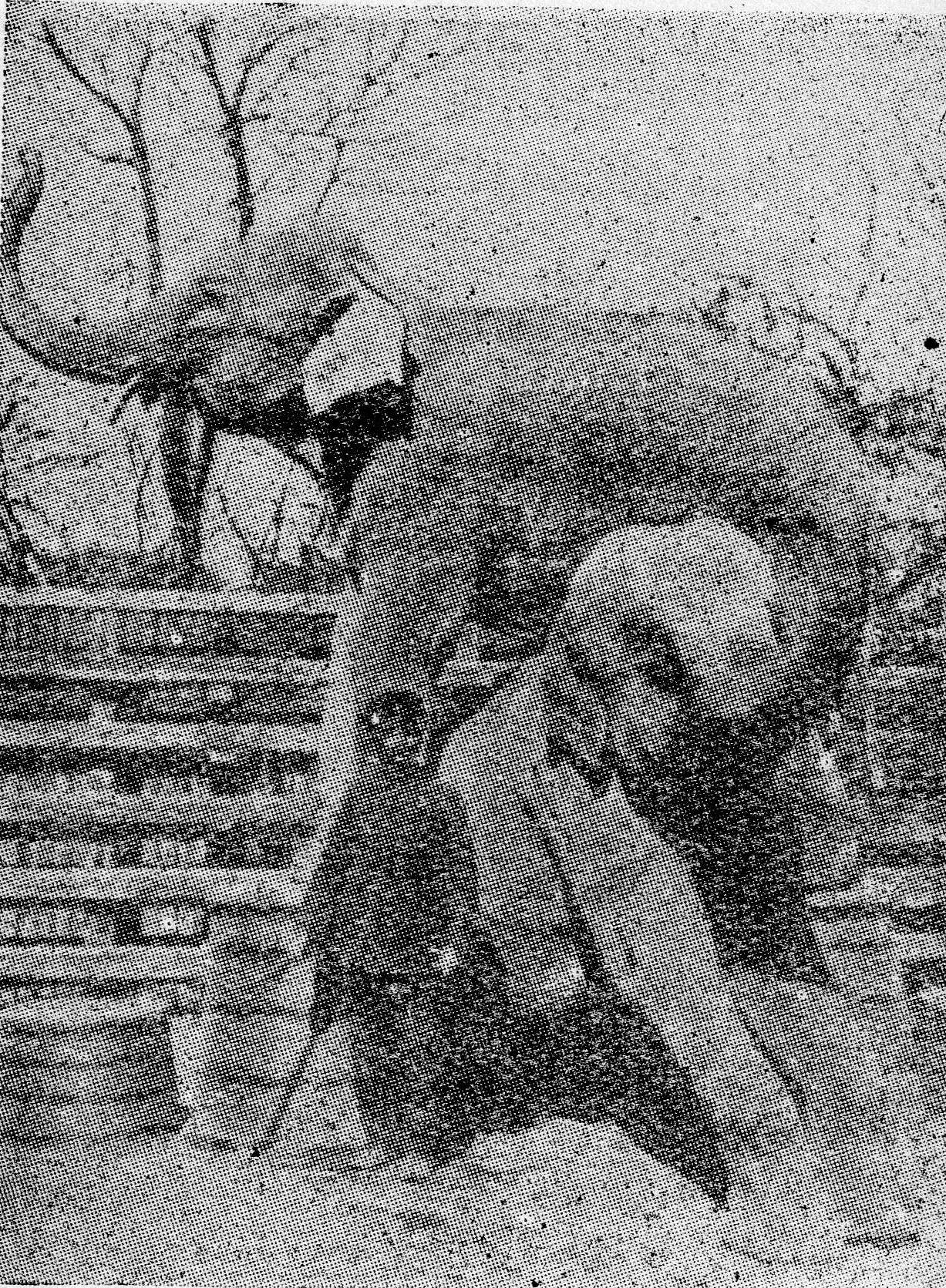

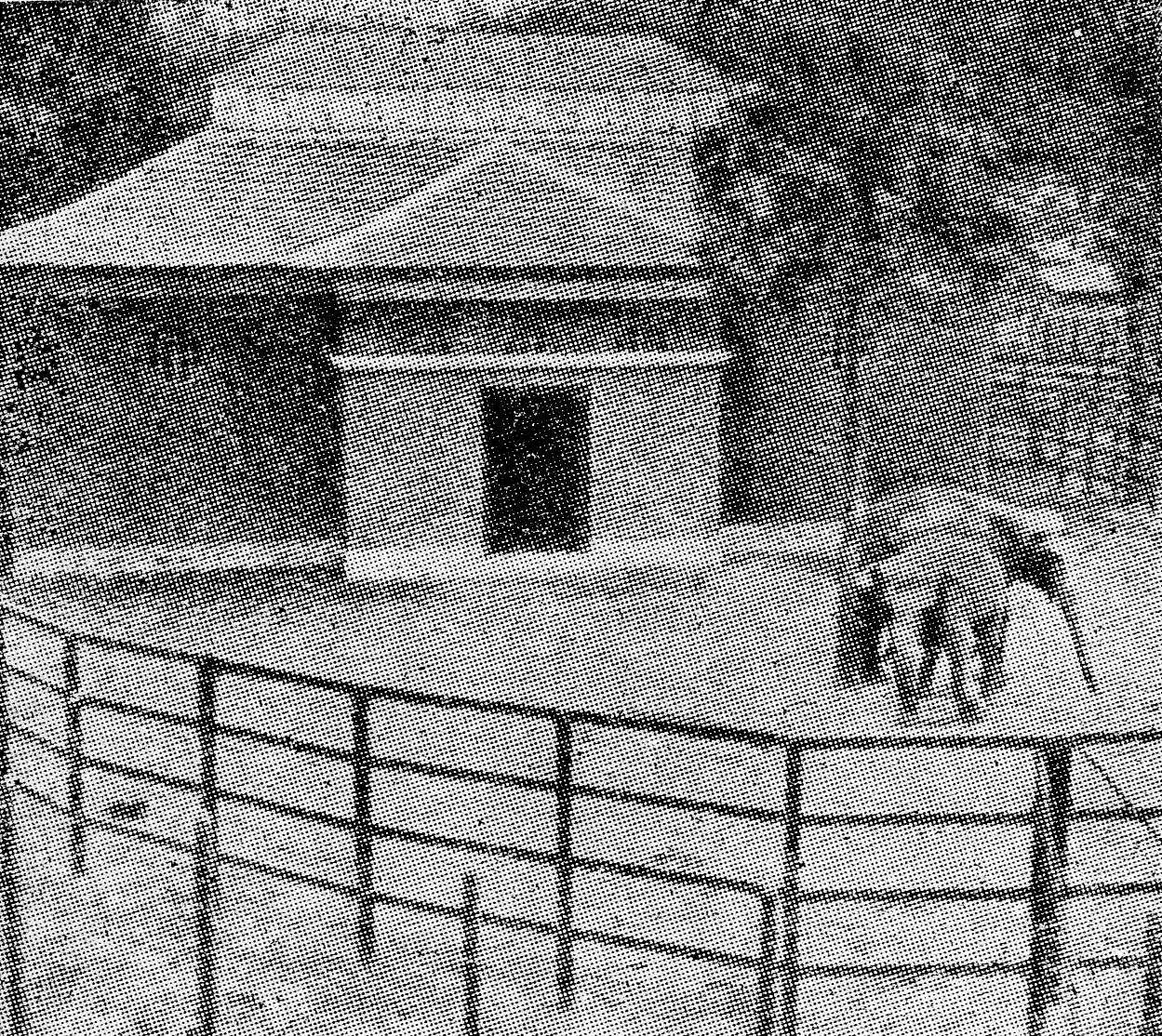

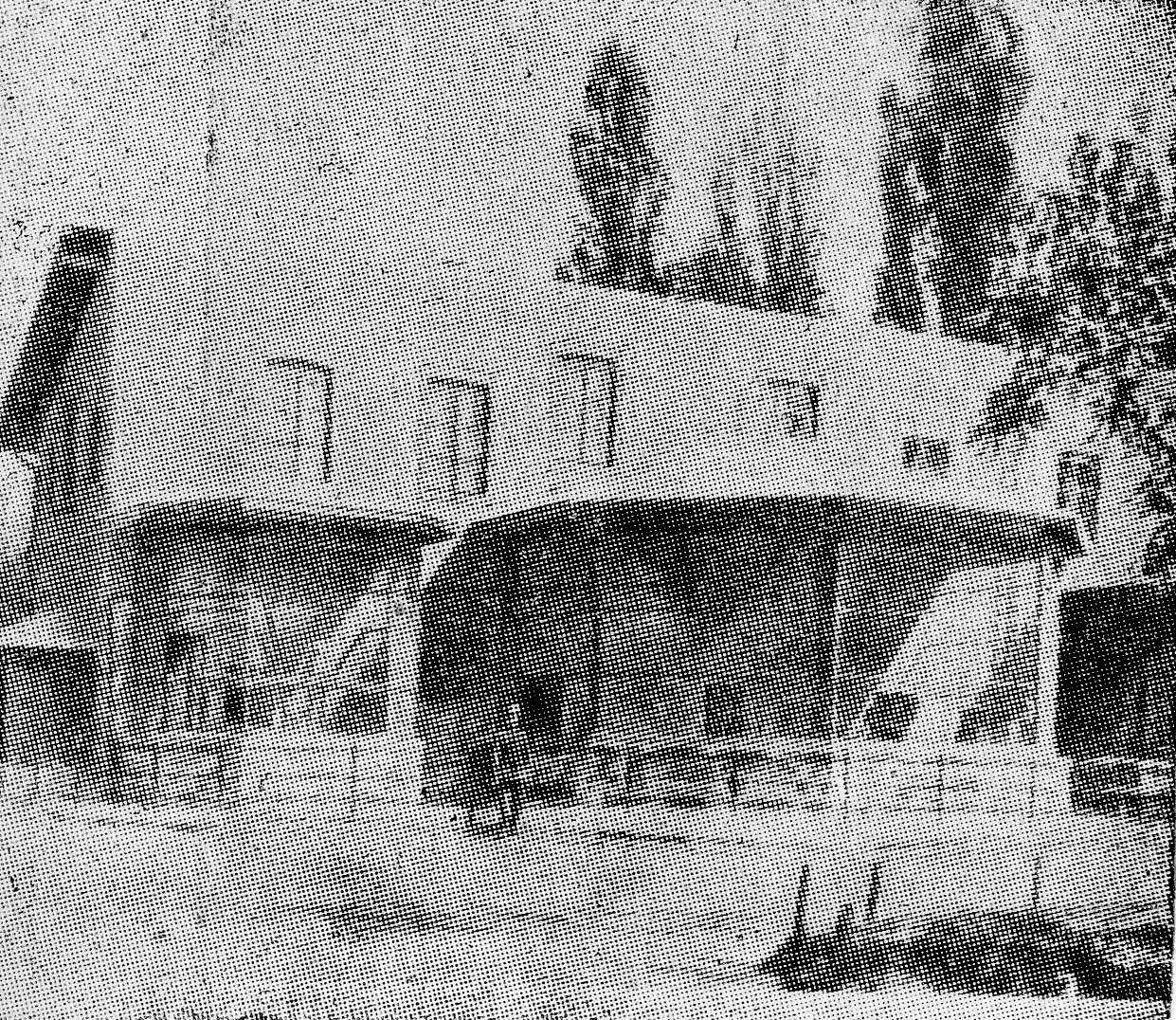

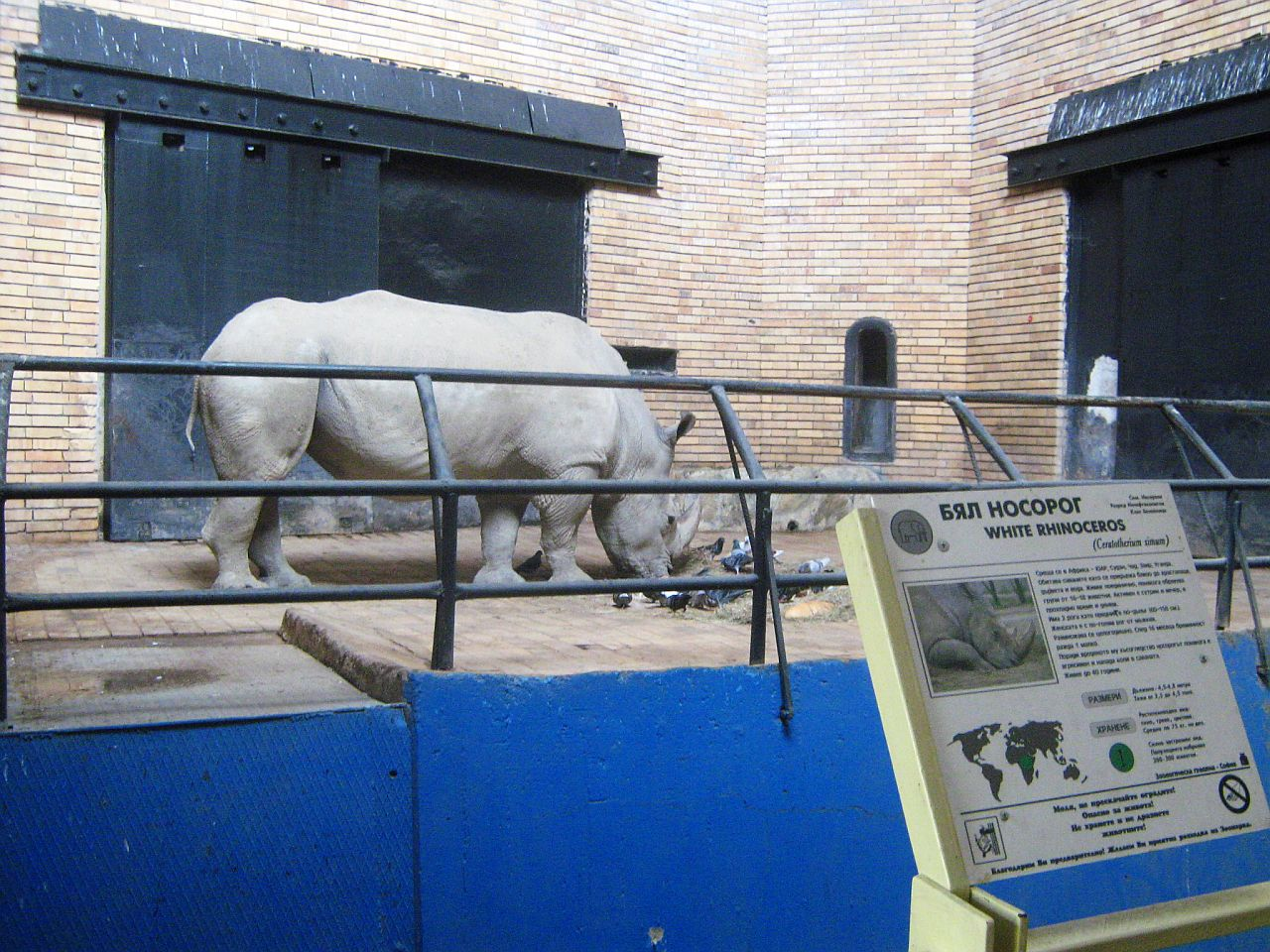
