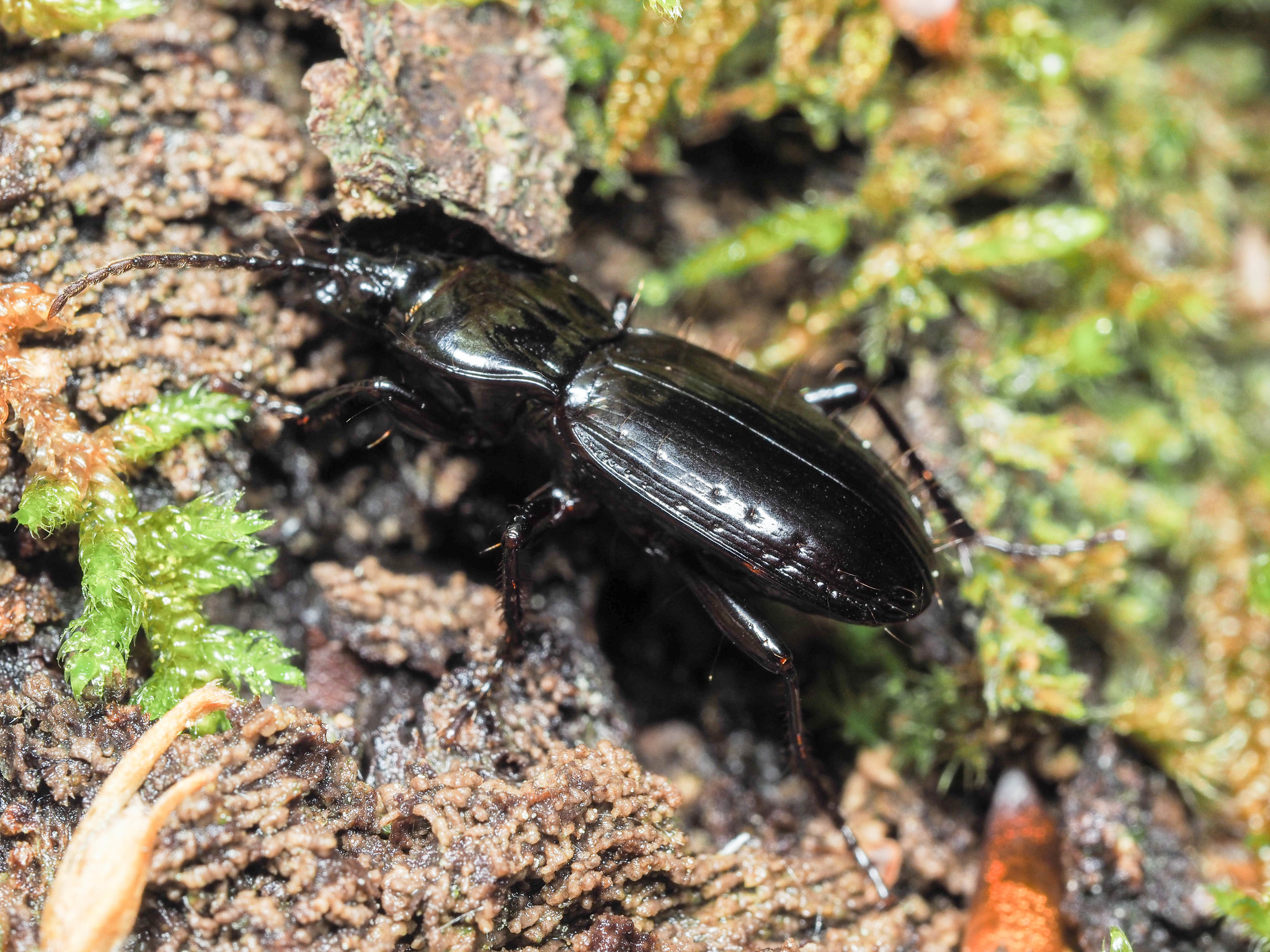
- Molops, Italy

Scientific classification
- Domain: Eukaryota
- Kingdom: Animalia
- Phylum: Arthropoda
- Class: Insecta
- Order: Coleoptera
- Suborder: Adephaga
- Family: Carabidae
- Subfamily: Pterostichinae
- Tribe: Pterostichini
- Subtribe: Pterostichina
- Genus: Molops; Bonelli, 1810

= Molops =

Genus of beetles

Molops is a genus in the beetle family Carabidae. There are more than 40 described species in Molops, found primarily in Europe.

== Species ==
These 41 species belong to the genus Molops:

- Molops albanicus Apfelbeck, 1904
- Molops alpestris (Dejean, 1828)
- Molops apfelbecki Ganglbauer, 1891
- Molops austriacus Ganglbauer, 1889
- Molops biokovensis G.Müller, 1916
- Molops bosnicus Ganglbauer, 1889
- Molops bucephalus (Dejean, 1828)
- Molops cephallenicus G.Müller, 1936
- Molops curtulus Ganglbauer, 1891
- Molops dalmatinus (Dejean, 1828)
- Molops dilatatus Chaudoir, 1868
- Molops dinaricus Apfelbeck, 1904
- Molops doderoi Schatzmayr, 1909
- Molops elatus (Fabricius, 1801)
- Molops euboeicus Ganglbauer, 1889
- Molops holdhausi G.Müller, 1917
- Molops longipennis (Dejean, 1828)
- Molops malshentianus Apfelbeck, 1918
- Molops matchai Roubal, 1917
- Molops merditanus Apfelbeck, 1906
- Molops obtusangulus Ganglbauer, 1889
- Molops osmanilis Apfelbeck, 1904
- Molops ovipennis Chaudoir, 1847
- Molops parnassicola Kraatz, 1875
- Molops parreyssi Kraatz, 1875
- Molops pentheri Apfelbeck, 1904
- Molops peristericus Apfelbeck, 1901
- Molops piceus (Panzer, 1793)
- Molops plurisetosus G.Müller, 1918
- Molops prenjus Apfelbeck, 1902
- Molops promissus Heyden, 1875
- Molops reiseri Apfelbeck, 1904
- Molops rhodopensis Apfelbeck, 1904
- Molops robustus (Dejean, 1828)
- Molops rufipes Chaudoir, 1843
- Molops simplex Chaudoir, 1868
- Molops spartanus (Schaum, 1862)
- Molops striolatus (Fabricius, 1801)
- Molops thessalicus G.Müller, 1930
- Molops valonensis G.Müller, 1936
- Molops weiratheri G.Müller, 1930
