= Cordioniscus =

Scientific classification
- Kingdom: Animalia
- Phylum: Arthropoda
- Class: Malacostraca
- Order: Isopoda
- Suborder: Oniscidea
- Family: Trichoniscidae
- Genus: Cordioniscus; Graeve, 1914

Genus of crustaceans

Cordioniscus is a genus of woodlice in the family Trichoniscidae. There are about 18 described species in Cordioniscus.

== Species ==
These 18 species belong to the genus Cordioniscus:

- Cordioniscus africanus Vandel, 1955
- Cordioniscus andreevi Schmalfuss & Erhard, 1998
- Cordioniscus antiparosi Andreev, 1985
- Cordioniscus beroni Vandel, 1968
- Cordioniscus bulgaricus Andreev, 1986
- Cordioniscus graecus Vandel, 1958
- Cordioniscus graevei Schmalfuss & Erhard, 1998
- Cordioniscus kalimnosi Andreev, 1997
- Cordioniscus kithnosi Andreev, 1986
- Cordioniscus leleupi Vandel, 1968
- Cordioniscus lusitanicus Reboleira & Taiti, 2015
- Cordioniscus paragamiani Schmalfuss & Erhard, 1998
- Cordioniscus patrizii Brian, 1955
- Cordioniscus riqueri
- Cordioniscus schmalfussi Andreev, 2002
- Cordioniscus spinosus (Patience, 1907)
- Cordioniscus stebbingi (Patience, 1907)
- Cordioniscus vandeli Dalens, 1970
