= List of woodlice of the British Isles =

Woodlice are the most species-rich group of terrestrial crustaceans. Of the 4,000 described species found worldwide, 35 species in 10 families are native to the British Isles. One of these species, Acaeroplastes melanurus, had been considered extinct in the British Isles but was rediscovered in 2002 at its only site (Howth, County Dublin, Ireland), and a further ten species have become naturalised in greenhouses, presumably transported with exotic plants. Five species are especially common throughout the British Isles, and are known as the "famous five species". They are Oniscus asellus (the common shiny woodlouse), Porcellio scaber (the common rough woodlouse), Philoscia muscorum (the common striped woodlouse), Trichoniscus pusillus (the common pygmy woodlouse) and Armadillidium vulgare (the common pill bug). One species, Metatrichoniscoides celticus, is endemic to Glamorgan, and is listed as a vulnerable species in the IUCN Red List.

== Armadillidae ==
Reductoniscus costulatus, Kesselyák, 1930
Reductoniscus costulatus occurs naturally in the Seychelles, on Mauritius, in Malaysia and in the Hawaiian Islands, but has been introduced to several parts of Europe, where it survives in greenhouses.

== Armadillidiidae ==
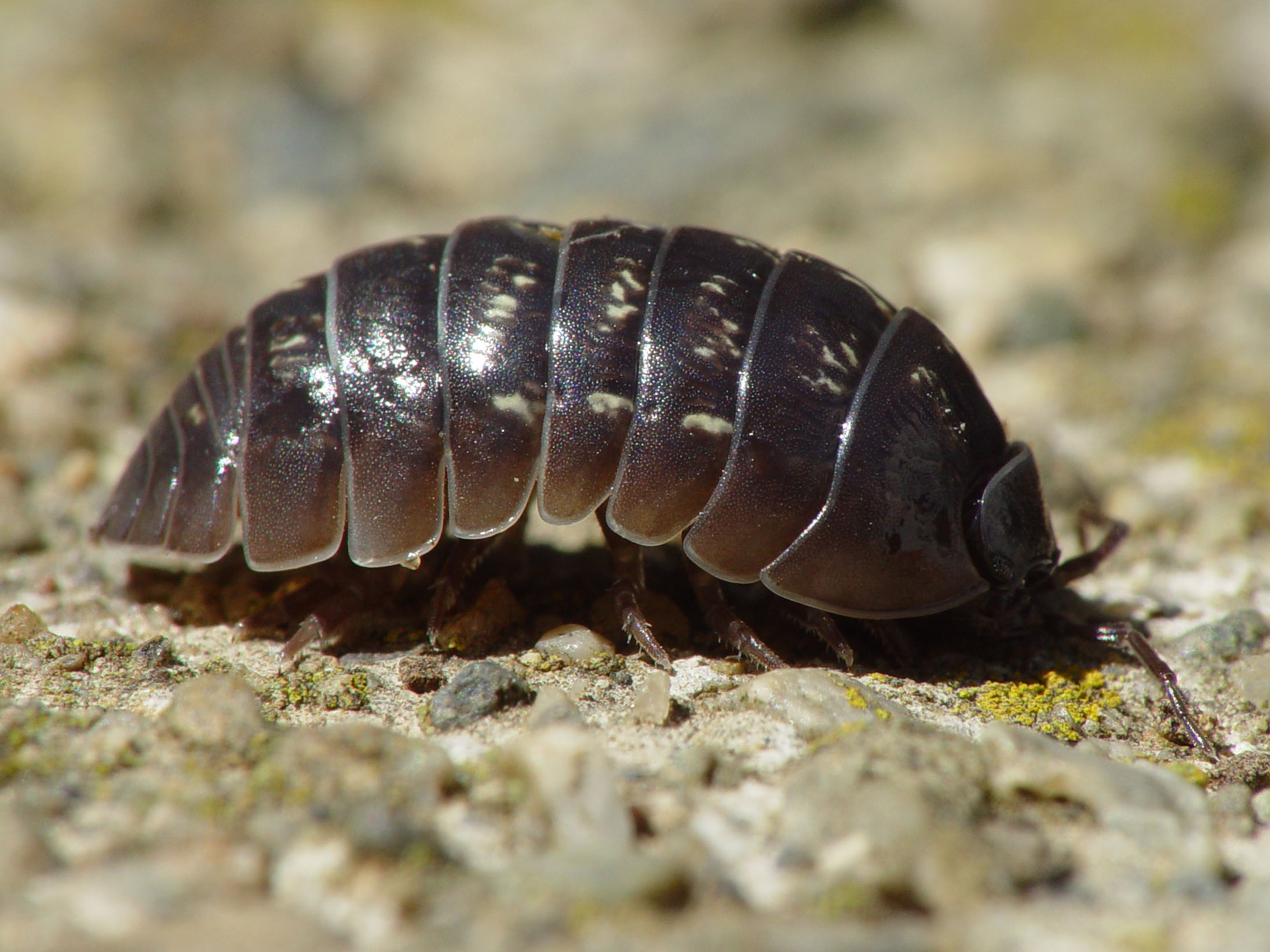
Armadillidium vulgare

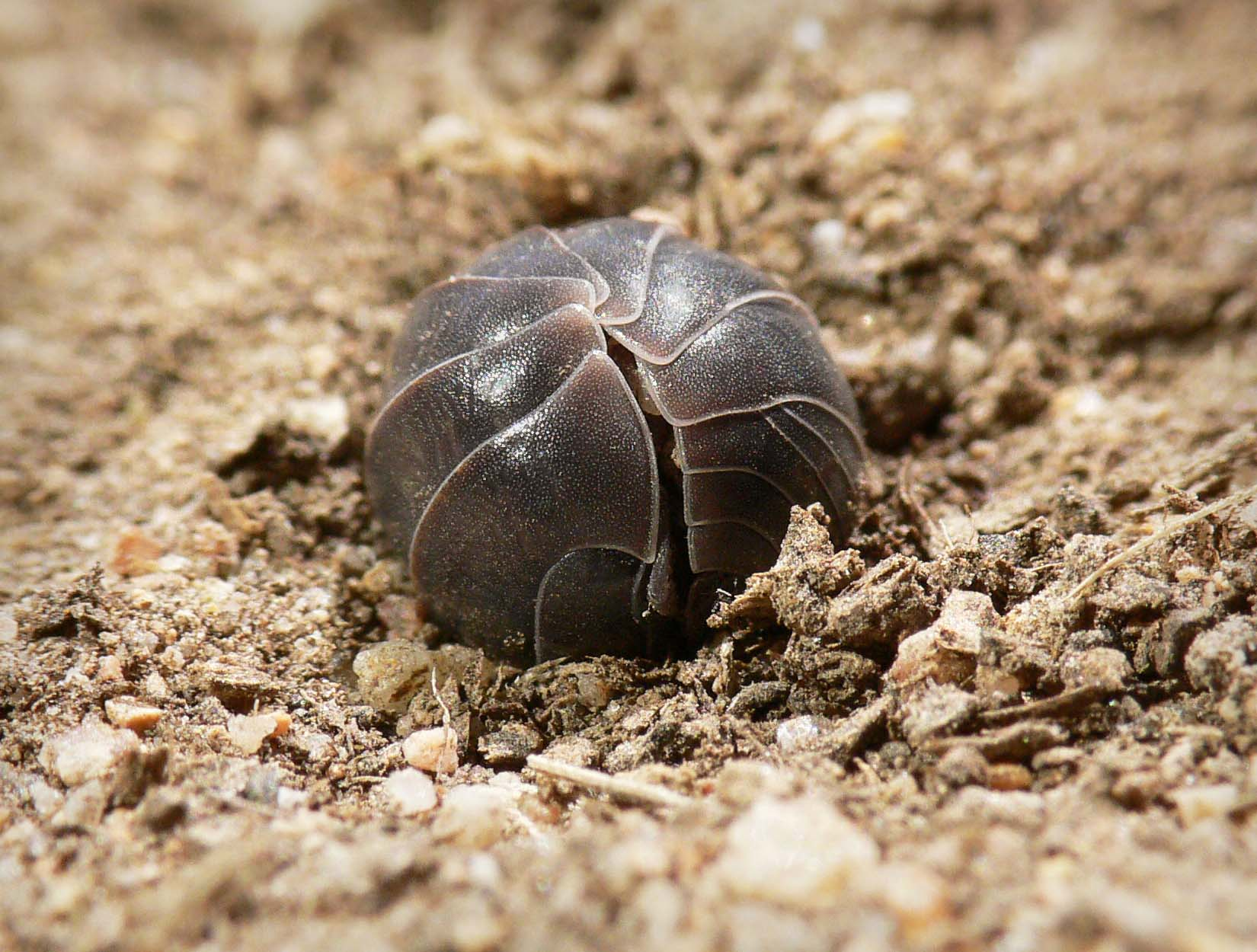
Armadillidium vulgare in the rolled-up defensive posture characteristic of pill bugs

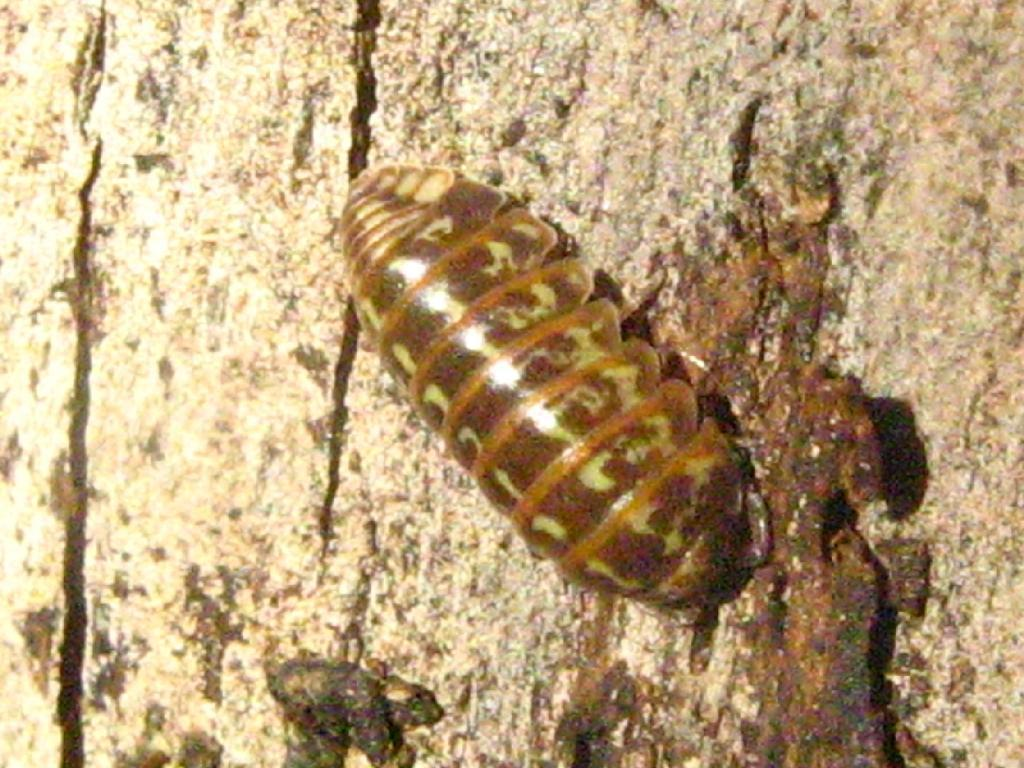
Armadillidium pictum

"Pill bugs" of the family Armadillidiidae are often confused with pill millipedes such as Glomeris marginata, which is also widespread and common in Britain and Ireland, but pill millipedes have two pairs of legs per body segment, while woodlice have only seven pairs of legs. Six certainly native species occur in the British Isles; some doubt exists as to the status of Eluma caelatum.

Armadillidium album, Dollfus, 1887
Armadillidium album is a pale-coloured species, and does not roll itself into a ball when disturbed. Rather, it remains stationary, but with its body slightly arched. It is only found at coastal sites, chiefly in sand dunes, having been first discovered in Britain at the Taw and Torridge estuaries in Devon in 1906. It is found from the Netherlands along the Atlantic coast of Europe to the Mediterranean, where it reaches as far east as Greece.
Armadillidium depressum, Brandt, 1833
Armadillidium depressum is a large pill bug, up to 20 mm (0.79 in) long. Females are somewhat variable in colour, but males are uniformly slate grey. It cannot roll up into a perfect ball, but leaves its antennae and telson exposed. In the British Isles, it is only found in South West England and South Wales, but is also found in Belgium, France and Italy.
Armadillidium nasatum, Budde-Lund, 1885
Like the previous species, Armadillidium nasatum cannot roll up into a perfect ball; it too leaves its antennae and telson exposed. As well as being introduced to North America, it is found natively from Italy and northern Spain to the Netherlands and Britain, where it is widely distributed across the southern half of the country.
Armadillidium pictum, Brandt, 1833
Armadillidium pictum occurs over most of Europe, where it is chiefly a forest species. In the British Isles, it is only known from a few sites, all remote from human habitation, in Cumbria and Powys. It closely resembles A. pulchellum, but it is darker in colour, with less distinct mottling, which is arranged in lines along the length of the body. It is also, at up to 9 mm (0.35 in) long, slightly larger than A. pulchellum.
Armadillidium pulchellum, Zenker, 1798
Armadillidium pulchellum may reach 6 mm (0.24 in) in length, and is covered with mosaic patterns of black, white, orange and red. The British Isles hold the greatest concentration of sites for this species, which also extends across Northern and Western Europe. In Great Britain, it is found on coastal cliffs and in upland areas, being particularly associated with Thymus spp.; in Ireland, its ecological tendencies are different, often being found in calcareous glacial sites, particularly eskers.
Armadillidium vulgare, Latreille, 1804
Armadillidium vulgare is the most common and thus the most well known of the pill bugs. It grows up to 14 mm (0.55 in) long, and is a uniform grey colour. Its abundance tails off to the north and west, and is not known to occur north of a line between the estuaries of the River Clyde and the River Tay in Scotland, or north-west of a line between Galway and Lough Foyle in Ireland. It is associated with sand dunes in the more north-westerly parts of its range, but is often replaced on Carboniferous limestone by the related species Armadillidium pulchellum. Beyond Britain, it is found throughout Europe and parts of Asia, and has been introduced to North America, Australia, South Africa and some islands in the Atlantic and Pacific Oceans.
Eluma caelata, Miers, 1877
Eluma caelata (previously Eluma purpurascens) is typically 10 mm (0.39 in), but exceptionally up to 15 mm (0.59 in) long. The body is purplish brown, with a pair of single large, black ocelli and a triangular telson. It is abundant on cliffs on Ireland's east coast, although it is also found beside railway lines away from the sea, suggesting it was introduced with railway ballast. In 1975, the species was discovered for the first time in Great Britain, and was originally known from two sites: Overstrand, Norfolk and near Herne Bay, Kent, both sites being coastal cliffs of soft rock. It is now known to occur at numerous locations in south-east England (mainly Kent and Essex) including several non-coastal, man-made habitats. It is found outside the British Isles on Atlantic coasts south to north-western Africa, as well as the Canary Islands, Azores and Madeira. It has been introduced to Tasmania and to French Guiana, from where the type specimen hails.

== Cylisticidae ==
Cylisticus convexus, De Geer, 1778
Cylisticus convexus, the "curly woodlouse", has a scattered distribution across the British Isles. It seems to occur either in coastal sites, or synanthropically in anthropogenic habitats. It has been introduced to sites across the New World, from Canada to Argentina.

== Halophilosciidae ==
Haplophilosciidae is a family of woodlice lacking pleopodal lungs. Its members are therefore restricted to coastal habitats.

Halophiloscia couchii, Kinahan, 1858
Haplophiloscia couchii is a coastal species which is almost never seen in daylight. It was originally described from Talland Bay, Cornwall, but is found as far south as Dakar (Senegal) and has also been introduced to North America, South America and Australia.
Stenophiloscia glarearum, Verhoeff, 1908
Stenophiloscia glarearum (formerly S. zosterae) is less than 6 mm (0.24 in) long and white, with a distinctly spiny dorsal surface. In the British Isles, it is only known from three sites: Slapton Ley, Scolt Head Island and Goldhanger, Essex. Outside Britain, the species is only known from the Canary Islands and Mediterranean coasts from Spain to Malta and Greece.

== Ligiidae ==
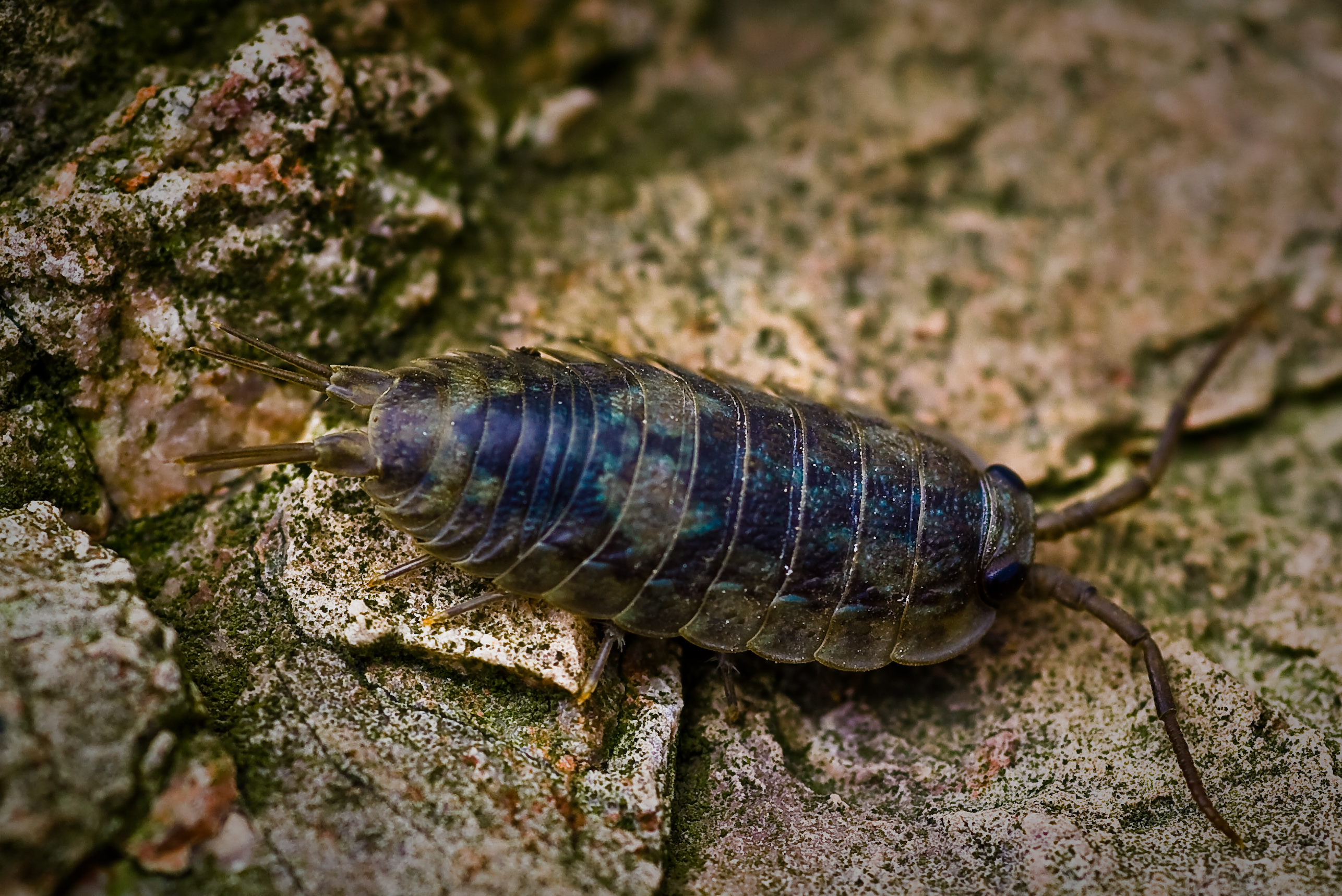
Ligia oceanica at Portishead, Somerset

Ligia oceanica, Linnaeus, 1767
Ligia oceanica, the sea slater, is the largest of the British woodlice, reaching a length of up to 30 mm (1.2 in). It is found on rocky shores throughout the British Isles. Its wider range extends from Norway to Morocco, and has since been introduced to North America.
Ligidium hypnorum, Cuvier, 1792
In the British Isles, Ligidium hypnorum is restricted to the south and east of England, being particularly frequent in Kent and Surrey, but with further populations in East Anglia, western Gloucestershire and North Somerset. It grows up to 9 mm (0.4 in) and is dark and shiny in appearance. It is found mainly in deciduous woodland, especially ancient woodland, and in fens. Outside Britain, it is distributed across Central Europe as far east as the Black Sea.

== Oniscidae ==
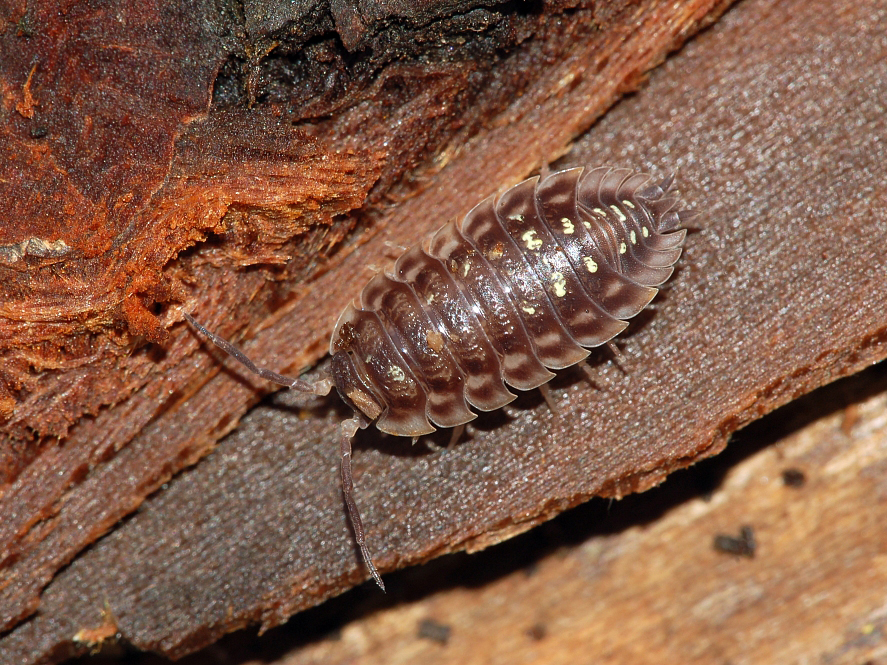
Oniscus asellus

Oniscus asellus, Linnaeus, 1758
Oniscus asellus, the "common shiny woodlouse", is the most widespread species of woodlouse in the British Isles, both geographically and ecologically. It is not known from the Mediterranean Basin, but is widespread in Northern and Western Europe, as far east as Ukraine, as well as in the Azores and Madeira; it has also been widely introduced in the Americas. It is one of the largest native woodlice in Britain, at up to 16 mm (0.63 in) long. It is relatively flat, and is a shiny patchy grey in colour.

== Philosciidae ==
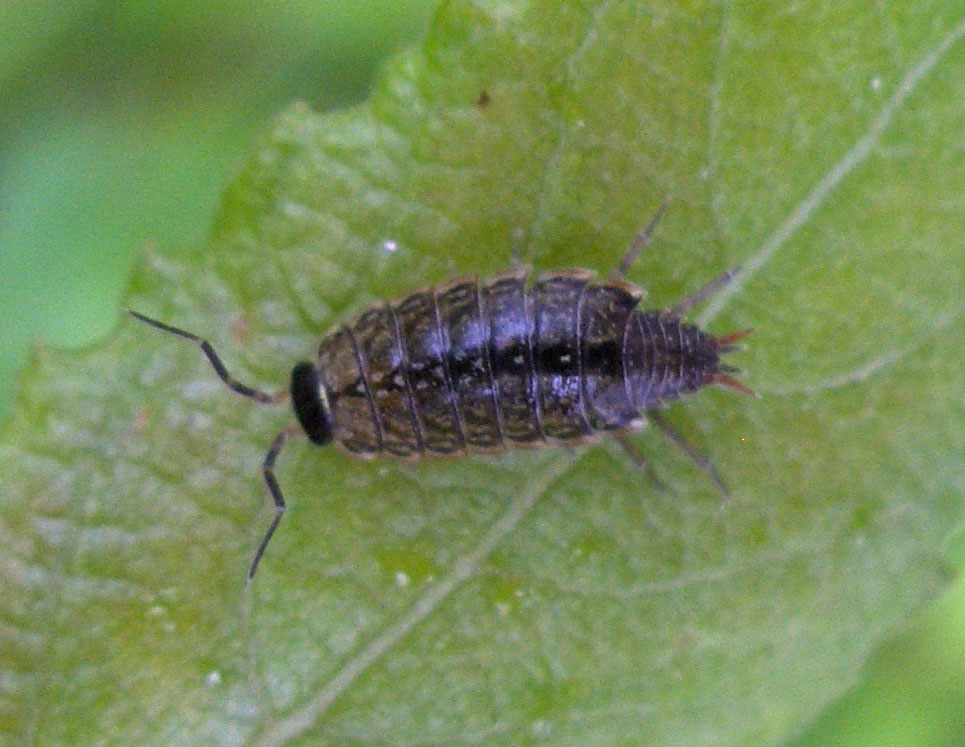
Philoscia muscorum

Burmoniscus meeusei, Holthuis, 1947
Originally described under the name Chaetophiloscia meeusei from greenhouses at the Royal Botanic Gardens, Kew, Burmoniscus meeusei is now known to occur in the wild in Brazil, Hawaii and Taiwan. It is not native to the British Isles.
Philoscia muscorum, Scopoli, 1763
Philoscia muscorum, the "common striped woodlouse" or "fast woodlouse", is up to 11 mm (0.43 in) long, with a greyish-brown, mottled, shiny body, and long legs, which allow it to move quickly. It is more common in the south of the British Isles, but can be found up to the north coast of Scotland.
Setaphora patiencei, Bagnall, 1908
Although the generic placement of this species is uncertain, it is known to occur in the wild in Mauritius and Réunion, and is now established in greenhouses in England. It is not native to the British Isles.

== Porcellionidae ==
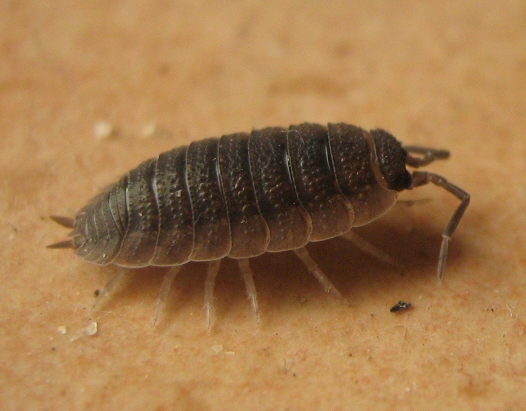
Porcellio scaber

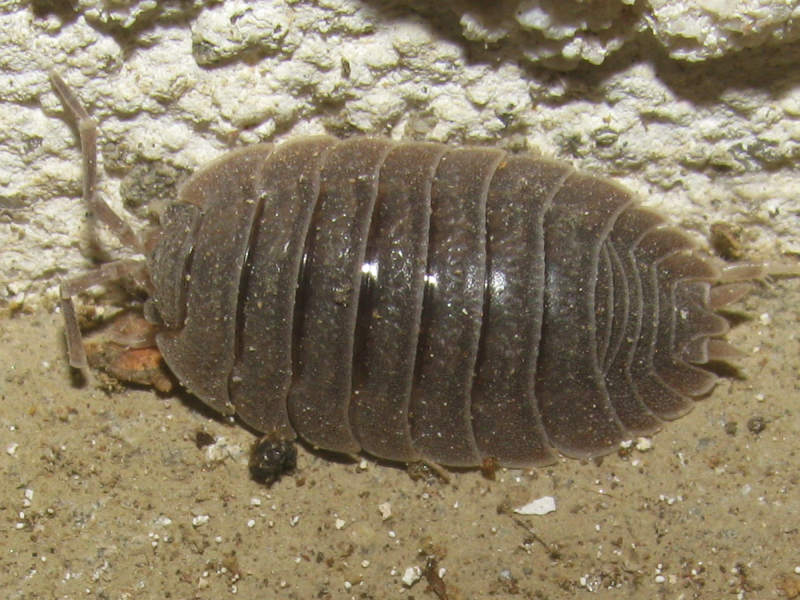
Porcellio dilatatus

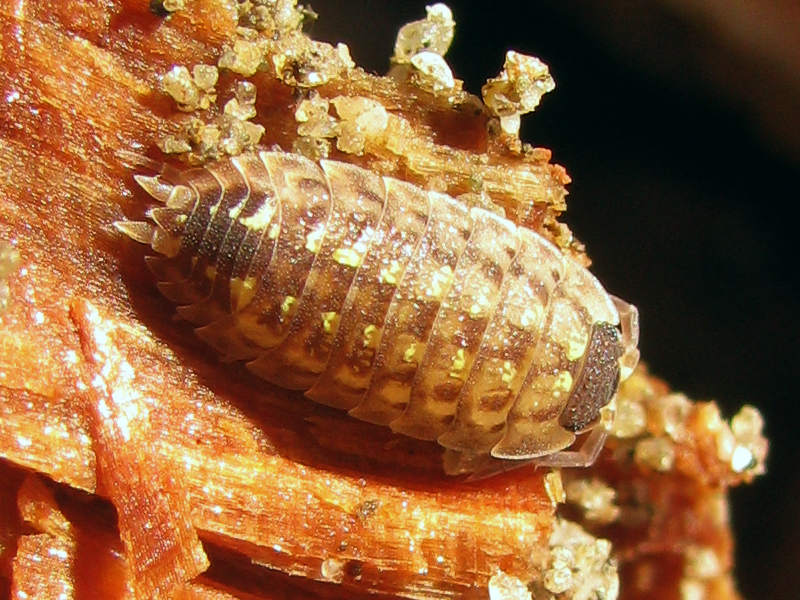
Porcellio spinicornis

Acaeroplastes melanurus, Budde-Lund, 1885
Acaeroplastes melanurus is known from much of southern Europe, from Croatia to Spain and the Azores, and including Algeria. In the British Isles, it is only known from cliffs at Howth, County Dublin, where it was found several times between 1909 and 1934. The species was rediscovered in 2002, and further study showed that a substantial population still exists.
Agabiformius lentus, Budde-Lund, 1885
Agabiformius lentus is native to the Mediterranean region, but has been widely introduced outside that range.
Porcellio dilatatus, Brandt, 1833
Porcellio dilatatus is a widespread species, although only abundant at a few restricted sites. It is large and wide, with a rounded tip to the telson in adults.
Porcellio laevis, Latreille, 1804
Porcellio laevis is, when fully grown, the largest of the Porcellio species in the British Isles, at up to 18 mm (0.71 in) long. It may be in decline due to the reduced availability of its preferred habitat; it was formerly common around horse dung. It is more common in warmer climates, and is found across Europe and North Africa, as well as having been introduced to many other parts of the world.
Porcellio scaber, Latreille, 1804
Porcellio scaber, the "common rough woodlouse", is one of the most frequent woodlice in the British Isles. It is also one of the best colonisers, having become established from Iceland to South America and South Africa. Adults may reach 11 mm (0.43 in) long.
Porcellio spinicornis, Say, 1818
Porcellio spinicornis is confined to stone walls and buildings, with a tendency to avoid areas with a strong Atlantic climatic influence. It is distinctively marked, with two rows of yellow marks along the body against a brown background with a darker median stripe and a blackish head. Its wider distribution covers much of Europe, but little of the Mediterranean region, eastwards to Ukraine; it has also been introduced to Canada and the United States.
Porcellionides cingendus, Kinahan, 1857
Porcellionides cingendus has an Atlantic, or Lusitanian distribution, stretching from Portugal to the British Isles, and reaching its northernmost location at St. John's Point, (near Killough) County Down. It partly replaces Philoscia muscorum where it occurs, and the two are easily confused in the field; Porcellionides cingendus, however, is narrower, and has a matt, not shiny, body.
Porcellionides pruinosus, Brandt, 1833
Porcellionides pruinosus is quite different from P. cingendus and the two are unlikely to be confused in the field. P. pruinosus has a characteristic dusty bloom and very pale legs. Although there is some doubt as to its native status in Britain, P. pruinosus has been found in Roman remains in London, indicating that if it was introduced, it was not introduced recently. The species is predominantly Mediterranean in its distribution, but has taken on a cosmopolitan distribution through the actions of man.

== Platyarthridae ==
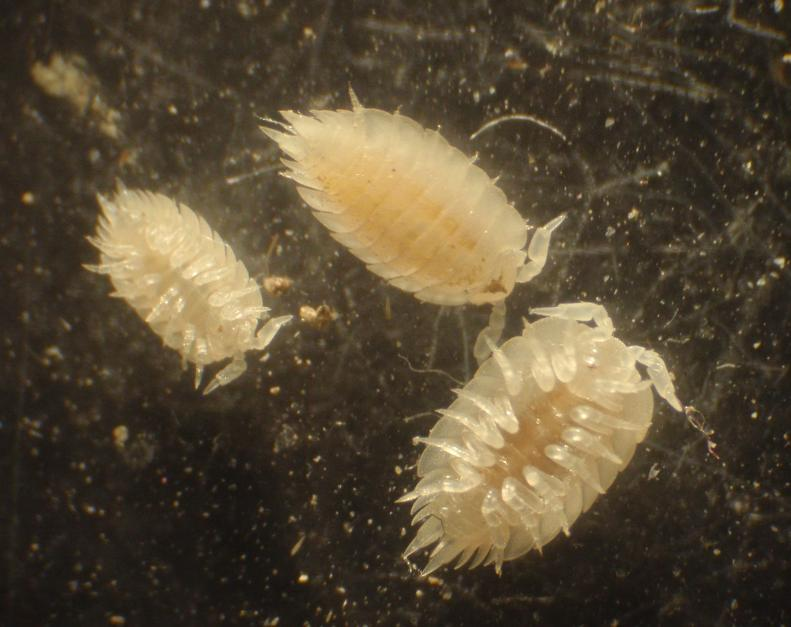
Platyarthrus hoffmannseggi

Platyarthrus hoffmannseggii, Brandt, 1833
Platyarthrus hoffmannseggii is closely associated with ants' nests, particularly those of Lasius flavus, Lasius niger and species of Myrmica. It has a distinctive oval shape and short antennae. Its distribution appears to follow those of the ants with which it lives, and the British Isles are the north-westerly limit of its range. Elsewhere, P. hoffmannseggii extends south to the Mediterranean. It is found outside Europe in North Africa and Turkey, and has been introduced to North America.
Trichorhina tomentosa, Budde-Lund, 1893
Trichorhina tomentosa is the only species of woodlouse originating in the Americas to have become established in the British Isles, where it survives in greenhouses.

== Styloniscidae ==
Cordioniscus stebbingi, Patience, 1907
The native range of Cordioniscus stebbingi is restricted to eastern Spain. It has, however, been introduced to greenhouses worldwide.
Styloniscus spinosus, Patience, 1907
Styloniscus spinosus is native to Mauritius, Réunion, Madagascar and Hawaii, but is found in some greenhouses in Great Britain.

== Trachelipodidae ==
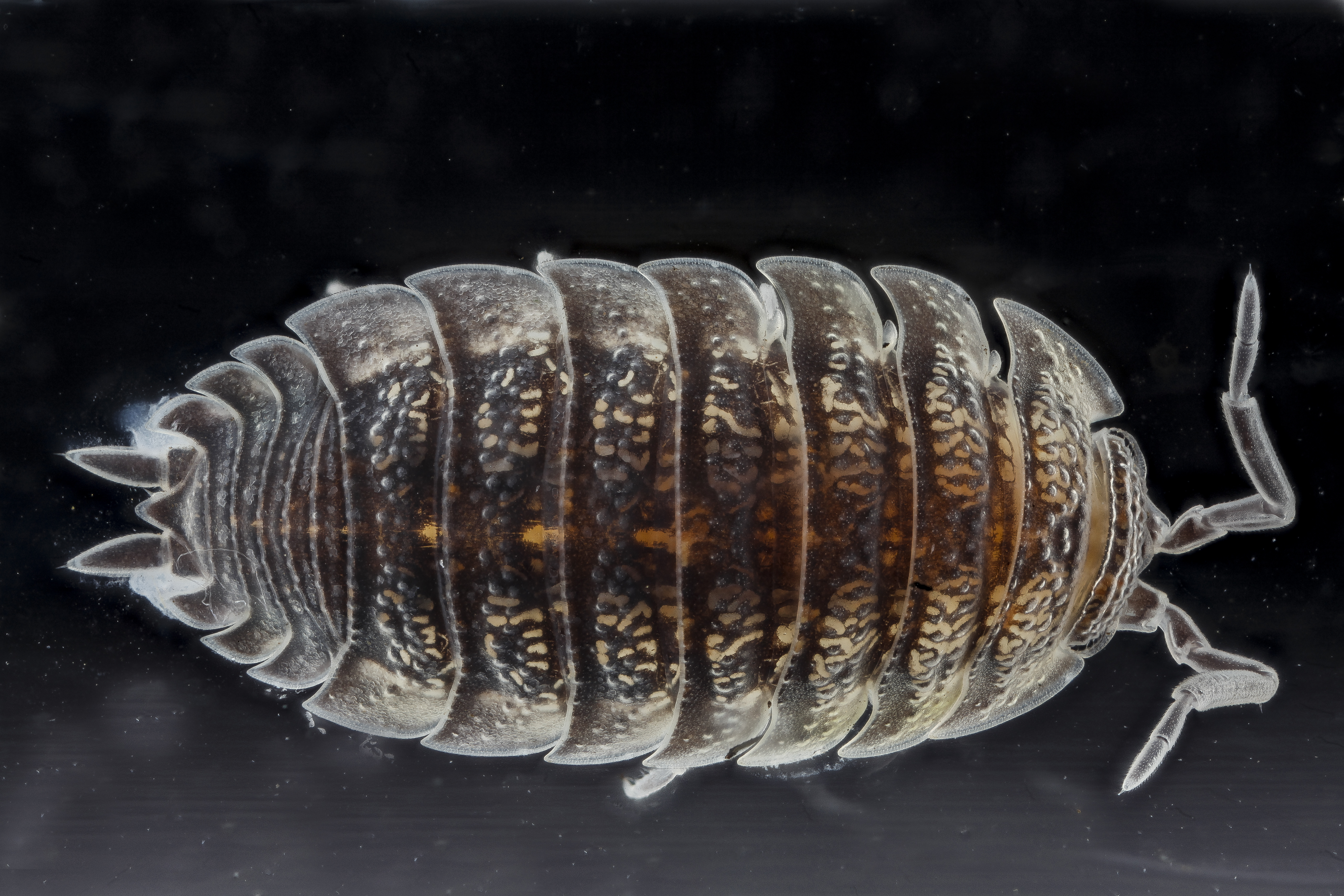
Trachelipus rathkii

Nagurus cristatus, Dollfus, 1881
Nagurus cristatus has a pantropical distribution, and is found in greenhouses in temperate climates, including in the British Isles, though it is not a native species.
Nagurus nanus, Budde-Lund, 1908
Nagurus nanus is found throughout the tropics in anthropogenic habitats.
Trachelipus rathkii, Brandt, 1833
Trachelipus rathkei is sometimes confused with the more frequent Porcellio scaber, although its markings, with a regular longitudinal pattern of a light colour on a grey-brown background, are distinctive. They can be distinguished by examining the number of pleopodal lungs on the animal's underside with a hand lens – species of Porcellio have only two pairs, while T. rathkei has five pairs.

== Trichoniscidae ==
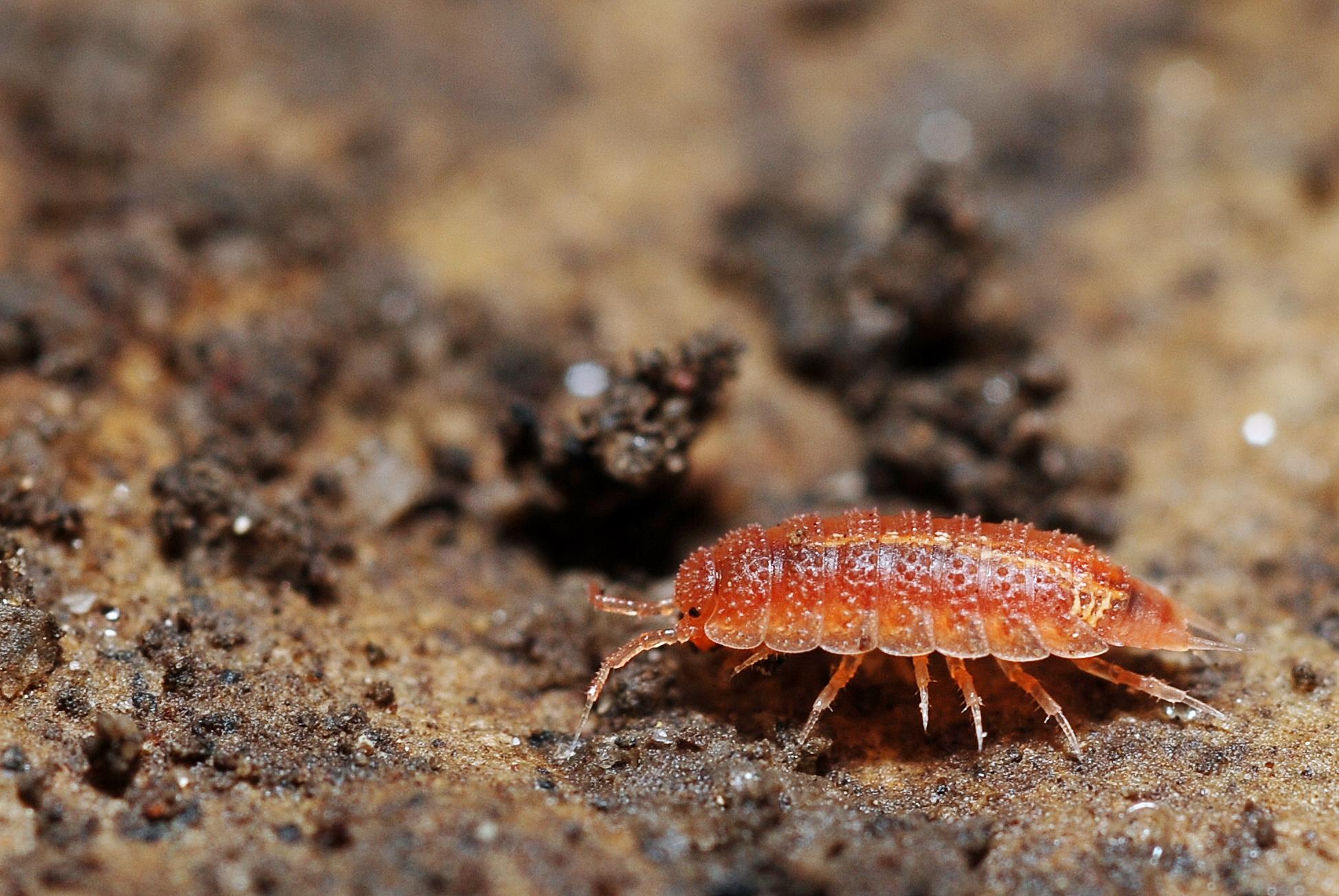
Androniscus dentiger

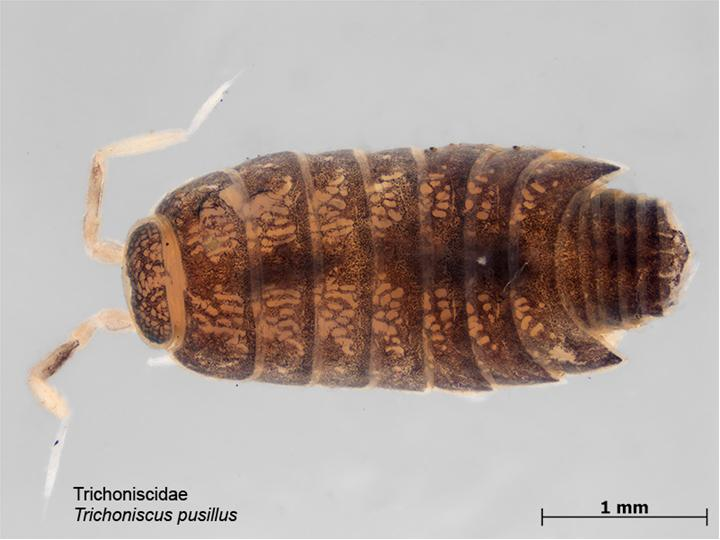
Trichoniscus pusillus

Androniscus dentiger, Verhoeff, 1908
Androniscus dentiger is readily recognisable by its distinctive pink colour, with a widening yellow stripe towards the rear. Adults are up to 6 mm (0.24 in) long. It is found at cliff sites, in scree and in caves, as well as in anthropogenic habitats. It is found as far south as North Africa and east to Croatia, and has been introduced to North America.
Buddelundiella cataractae, Verhoeff, 1930
Buddelundiella cataractae is an inconspicuous woodlouse, up to 4 mm (0.16 in) long and similar in appearance to a grain of sand when rolled up. Within Britain, it is only known from Cardiff, Barry and a site near Snettisham, Norfolk, although it has a wide distribution in Europe, possibly reaching as far east as Georgia.
Haplophthalmus danicus, Budde-Lund, 1880
Haplophthalmus danicus is reasonably widely distributed in the British Isles, but is rare outside South East England. It is a pale animal, up to 4 mm (0.16 in) long, with longitudinal ridges along its body. It is found throughout Europe, in Turkey, North America, Japan and several islands in the Atlantic Ocean.
Haplophthalmus mengii, Zaddach, 1844
Haplophthalmus mengei has a narrower body than H. danicus, but is a similar size and colour. It is found mostly in coastal or limestone-rich sites. Outside Britain, the species is thought to occur as far east as Austria and Poland.
Metatrichoniscoides celticus, Oliver & Trew, 1981
Metatrichoniscoides celticus is the smallest of the British woodlice, at only 3 mm (0.12 in) long. It is white in appearance and is only known to occur along a 48 km (30 mi) stretch of the Glamorgan coast. It was discovered perhaps as late as 1979, and is listed as vulnerable in the IUCN Red List because of its small population size. It is endemic to the British Isles.
Miktoniscus linearis, Patience, 1908
Miktoniscus linearis is not believed to be a native British species, although so far it is only known from greenhouses in England and Germany.
Miktoniscus patiencei, Vandel, 1946
Miktoniscus patiencei is found in soils and shingles just above the strand line of salt marshes and sea cliffs. It is small, at 4 mm (0.16 in) in length, and white. It has been found quite widely along the south coasts of England and Ireland, and also at a site in Kincardineshire. Elsewhere in Europe, it is known from the English Channel coasts of Brittany and from the Channel Islands.
Oritoniscus flavus, Budde-Lund, 1906
Oritoniscus flavus is, despite the implication in its name, a dark purple or maroon colour, and can thus be told apart from the paler Trichoniscus pusillus. It is also, at 8 mm (0.31 in) long, slightly larger. It has a wide head and a tapering body, producing a shape reminiscent of a trilobite. It is rare in Great Britain, being found only in south Wales and in Midlothian in Scotland, but is widespread in Ireland, and is found further afield in the Pyrenees, leading to speculation that the species may be part of the "Lusitanian fauna".
Trichoniscoides albidus, Budde-Lund, 1880
As with the previous species, Trichoniscoides albidus has a misleading specific epithet, since in life it is reddish-purple. It is similar to Trichoniscus pusillus, but its exoskeleton is dull, unlike the shiny surface in Trichoniscus pusillus. It is found in areas with an Atlantic climate from France to southern Sweden.
Trichoniscoides saeroeensis, Lohmander, 1923
Trichoniscoides saeroeensis is distinctively coloured, with a pink pleon, but a white pereon, and with red or pink ocelli. It is widely distributed around British and Irish coasts, and is also known from Brittany, Denmark and Sweden.
Trichoniscoides sarsi Patience, 1908
Trichoniscoides sarsi resembles the previous species, but has noticeable orange or pink patches on either side of its rear; unlike T. saeroeensis, however, T. sarsi is found inland. It seems to tolerate cold especially well, and has been recorded outside the British Isles from France, Germany, Denmark, Sweden and Norway, and has also been introduced to Newfoundland.
Trichoniscus pusillus, Brandt, 1833
Trichoniscus pusillus, the "common pygmy woodlouse", is widespread in Europe north of the Alps, and has been introduced to Madeira, the Azores and North America. In the south of its range, T. pusillus reproduces sexually, but towards the north of its range, parthenogenesis predominates. It is the most abundant woodlouse species in Britain, and extremely widespread, occurring as far north as the northernmost tip of Shetland. It is shiny in appearance and reddish-brown in colour, with white patches visible on close inspection, where muscles attach to the exoskeleton. It reaches a maximum size of 5 mm (0.20 in) long.
Trichoniscus pygmaeus, Sars, 1899
Trichoniscus pygmaeus is perhaps the most under-recorded British woodlouse species, since it lives deeply buried in the soil, and adults resemble immature individuals of the very abundant Trichoniscus pusillus. It is found from Morocco, across Europe, to south-western Russia (Krasnodar Krai).
