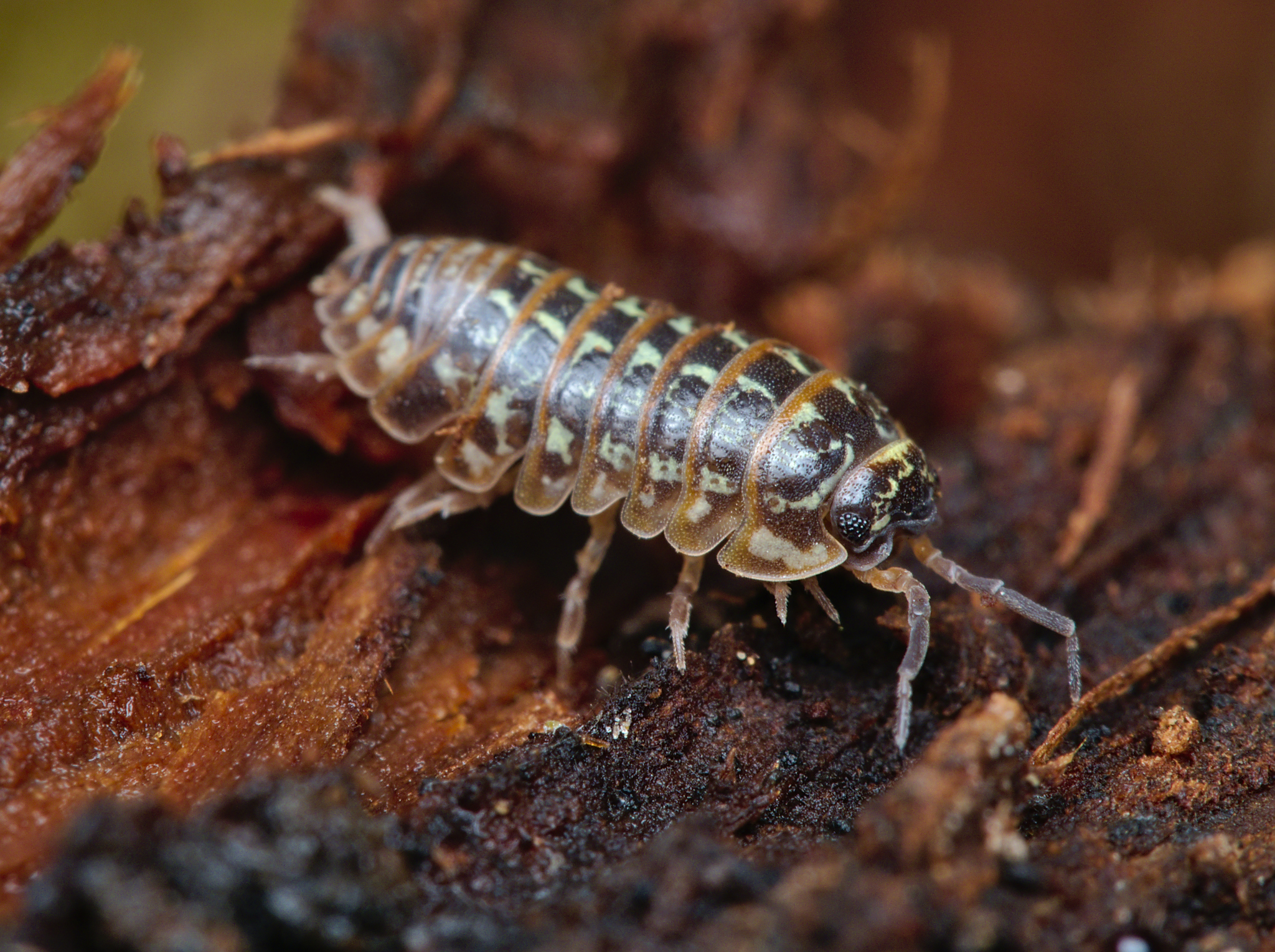

Scientific classification
- Kingdom: Animalia
- Phylum: Arthropoda
- Class: Malacostraca
- Order: Isopoda
- Suborder: Oniscidea
- Family: Armadillidiidae
- Genus: Armadillidium
- Species: A. pictum

Binomial name
- Armadillidium pictum Brandt, 1833
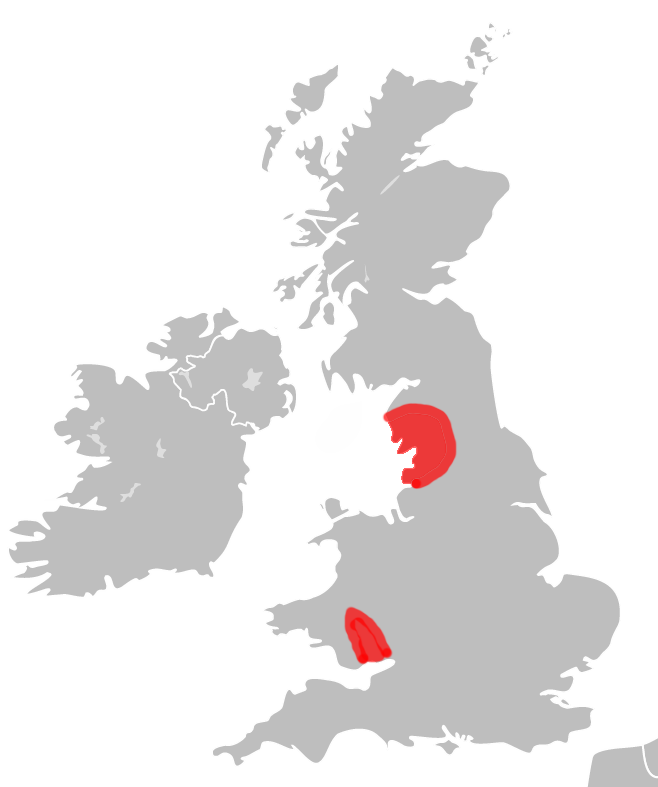
- Range in Britain

Synonyms
- Armadillidium garumnicum; Armadillidium grubei; Armadillidium rhenanum

= Armadillidium pictum =

Species of woodlouse

Armadillidium pictum is a species of woodlouse which occurs over most of Europe, except the Mediterranean Basin and Southeast Europe. In the British Isles, it is only known from a few sites, making it by some accounts, "Britain's rarest woodlouse". Since these sites are all remote from human habitation, in Cumbria and Powys, the species is thought to be native rather than introduced.

Armadillidium pictum is chiefly a forest species, and may be found several metres above the ground under loose bark or in holes in rotting wood. It closely resembles A. pulchellum, but it is darker in colour, with less distinct mottling, which is arranged in lines along the length of the body. It is also, at up to 9 mm (0.35 in) long, slightly larger than A. pulchellum.

== See also ==
- List of woodlice of the British Isles
