= Pleopodal lungs =

Feature of isopod anatomy

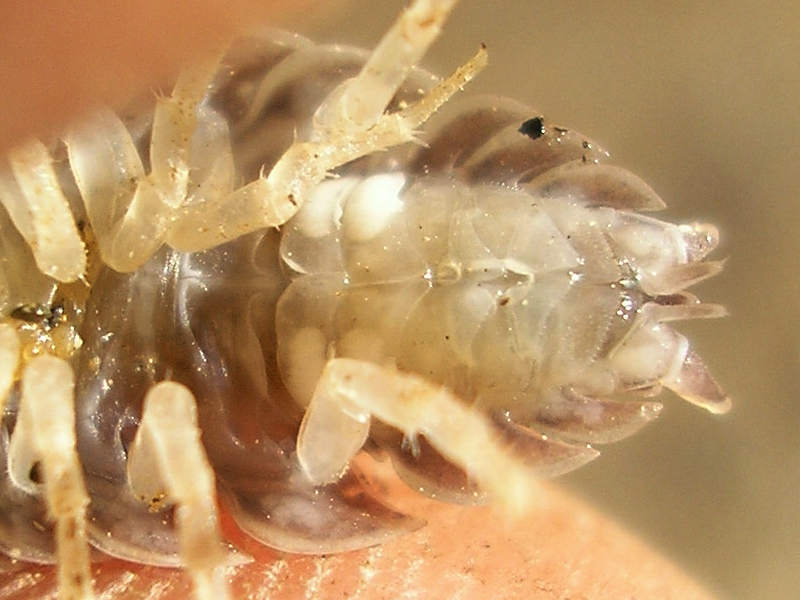
The white patches on the first two pairs of pleopods on this specimen of Porcellio laevis identify them as pleopodal lungs.

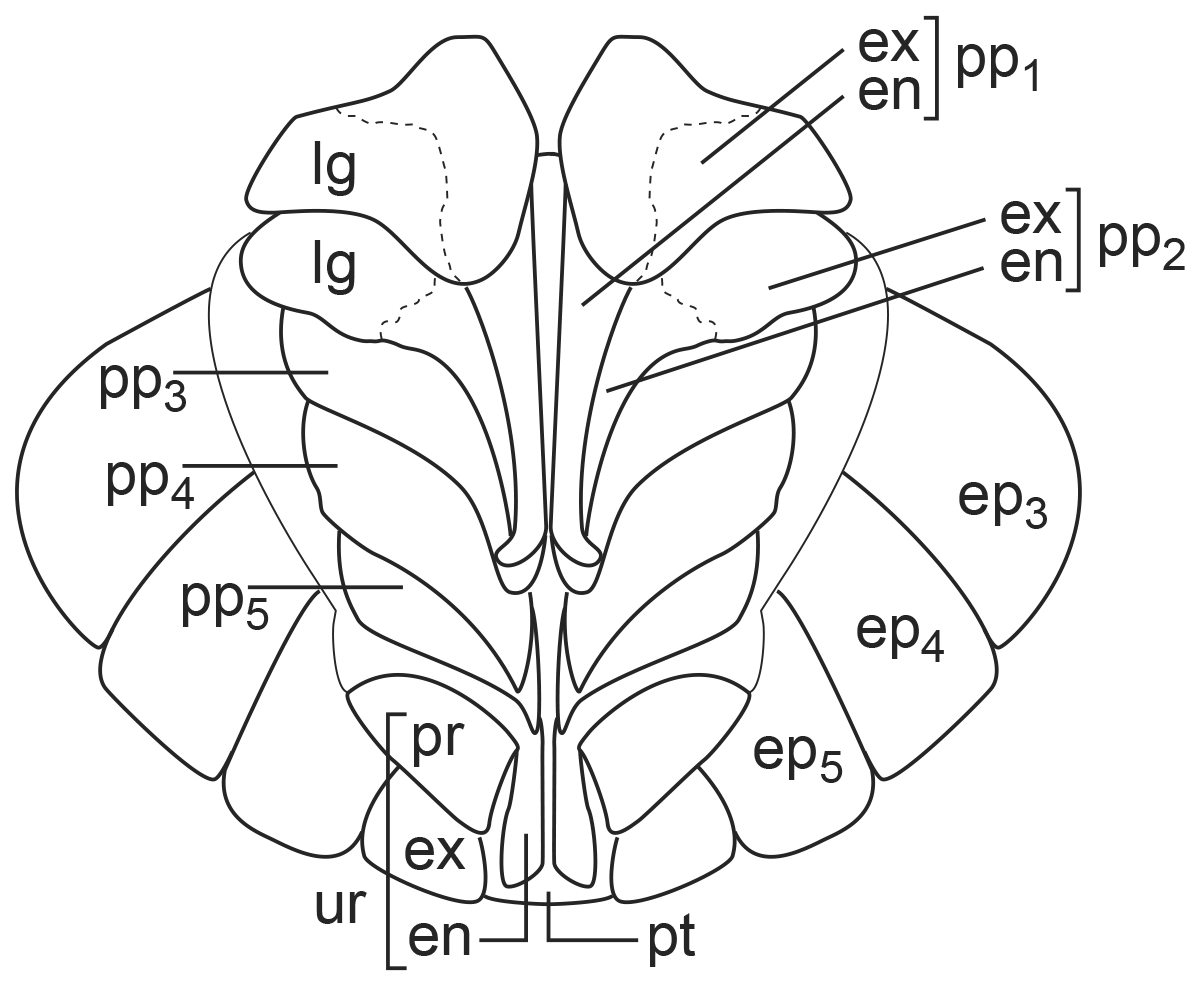
Armadillidium vulgare, male pleon, ventral view. en endopodite ep epimeron ex exopodite lg pleopodal lung pp pleopod pr protopodite pt pleotelson ur uropod

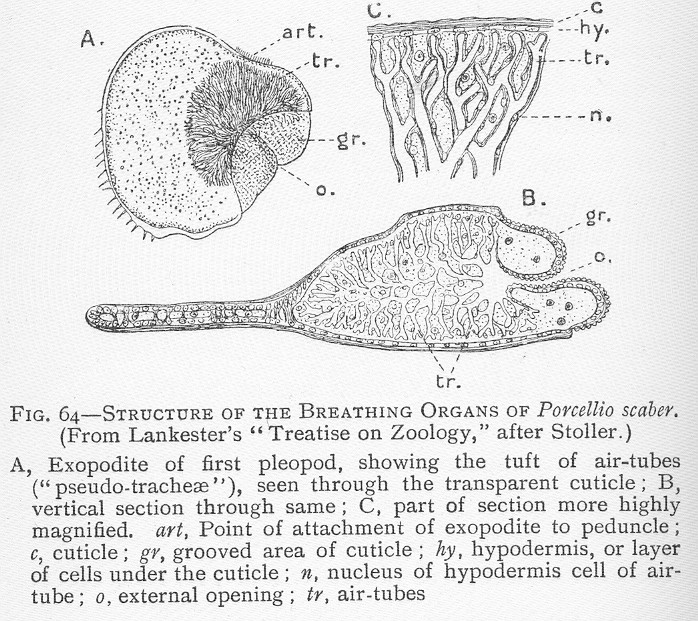
Pleopodal lungs of Porcellio scaber

Pleopodal lungs are an anatomical feature of terrestrial isopods and a component of their respiratory system. They are ancestrally derived from pleopodal gills, and they facilitate gas exchange on land. They perform a function similar to spiracles in insects.

Pleopodal lungs are identifiable on woodlice as white patches on the lower five segments (the pleon) on the ventral side (underside). The number of pleopodal lungs varies by species: they may have up to five pairs, or only two pairs as in Porcellio laevis; a minority of species lack pleopodal lungs entirely.
