= Streptomyces coacervatus =

Scientific classification
- Domain: Bacteria
- Kingdom: Bacillati
- Phylum: Actinomycetota
- Class: Actinomycetia
- Order: Streptomycetales
- Family: Streptomycetaceae
- Genus: Streptomyces
- Species: S. coacervatus

Binomial name
- Streptomyces coacervatus Shibazaki et al. 2011

Type strain
- AS-0823, DSM 41983, IFM 11055, JCM 17138

Species of bacterium

Streptomyces coacervatus is a Gram-positive bacterium species from the genus of Streptomyces which has been isolated from the intestinal tract of the common pill-bug Armadillidium vulgare in Chiba City in Japan.

== See also ==
- List of Streptomyces species
