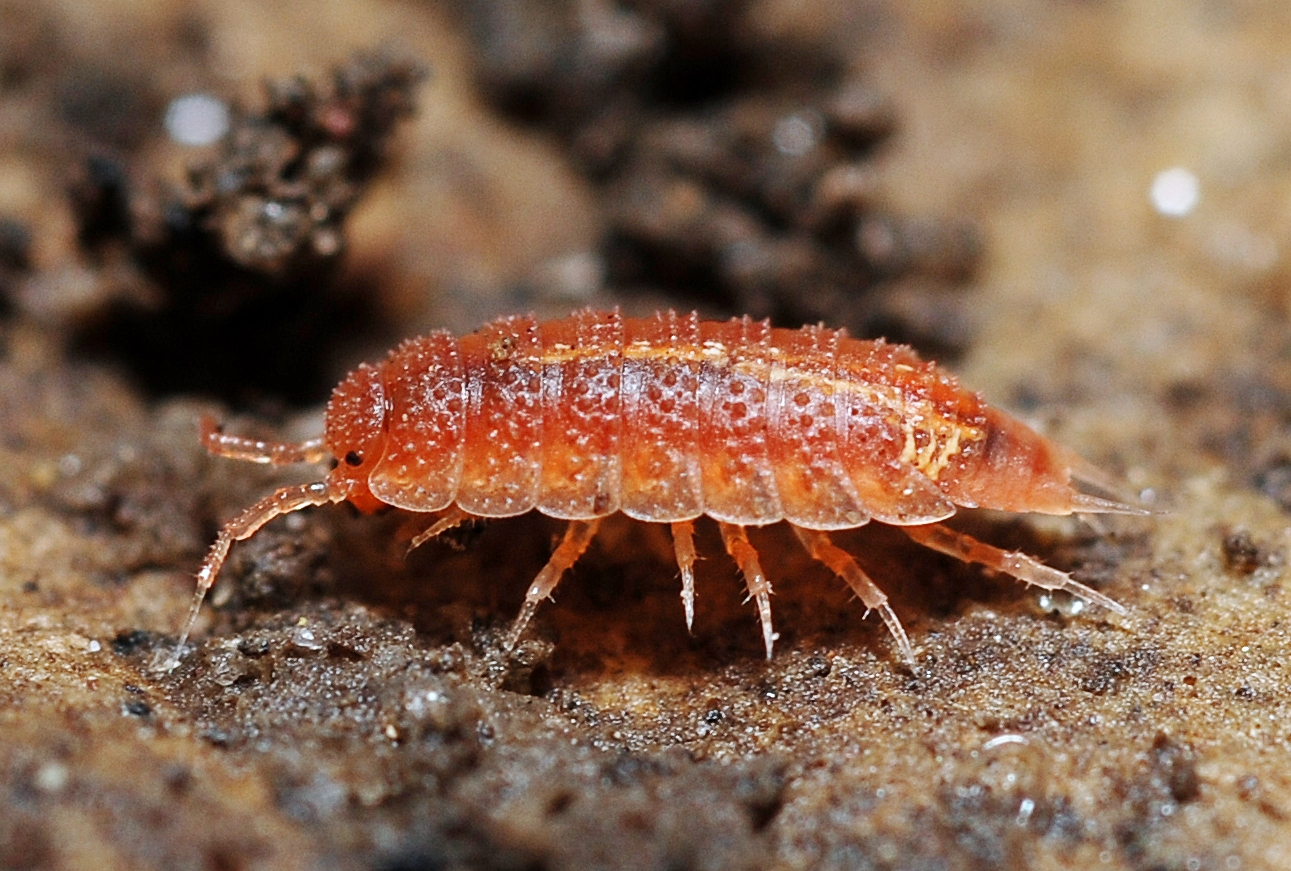

Scientific classification
- Kingdom: Animalia
- Phylum: Arthropoda
- Class: Malacostraca
- Order: Isopoda
- Suborder: Oniscidea
- Family: Trichoniscidae
- Genus: Androniscus
- Species: A. dentiger

Binomial name
- Androniscus dentiger Verhoeff, 1908

Synonyms
- Androniscus africanus; Androniscus alpinus; Androniscus carli; Androniscus weberi; Androniscus wolfi; Itea dentiger; Stenasellus hazeltoni; Trichoniscus dentiger

= Androniscus dentiger =

Species of woodlouse

Androniscus dentiger, the rosy woodlouse or pink woodlouse, is a species of woodlouse found from the British Isles to North Africa.

== Description ==
Androniscus dentiger is a small woodlouse, at only 6 mm (¼ in) long, and is characteristically pink or orange in colour, with a yellow stripe along the midline of the dorsal surface, which divides in two towards the animal's tail. It has large eyes for its size and a granular exoskeleton.

== Ecology ==
In the British Isles, A. dentiger is found in a wide variety of habitats, including coastal areas, gardens, old quarries and caves. It lives where there is a significant amount of lime available, and is reported to show a preference for Anglican churchyards over Catholic ones because the older, Protestant churches used ox-blood mortar.

In the south of its range, A. dentiger is primarily troglobitic, with populations in different cave systems being genetically isolated by the lack of migration between caves. Animals like A. dentiger which prefer to live in caves, but are not restricted to the cave environment may be termed troglophilic.

In North America, A. dentiger is only known to occur in greenhouses.

== Subspecies ==
According to some authors, A. dentiger may be considered a complex of sibling species or cryptic species . Six subspecies are recognised:

- Androniscus dentiger africanus Arcangeli, 1939
- Androniscus dentiger caecus Brian, 1938
- Androniscus dentiger calcivagus Verhoeff, 1908
- Androniscus dentiger croaticus Strouhal, 1939
- Androniscus dentiger dentiger Verhoeff, 1908
- Androniscus dentiger ligulifer Verhoeff, 1908

== See also ==
- List of woodlice of the British Isles
