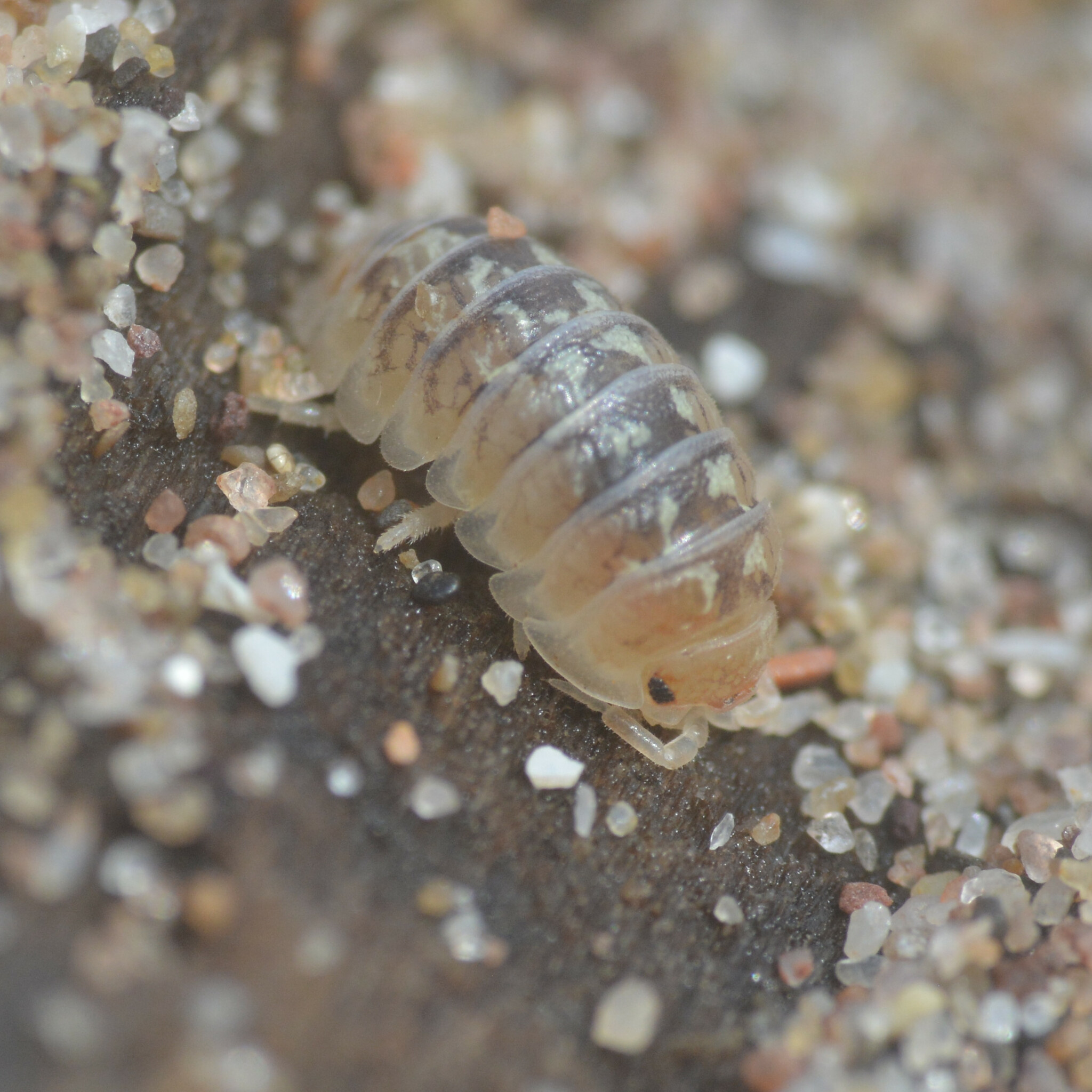

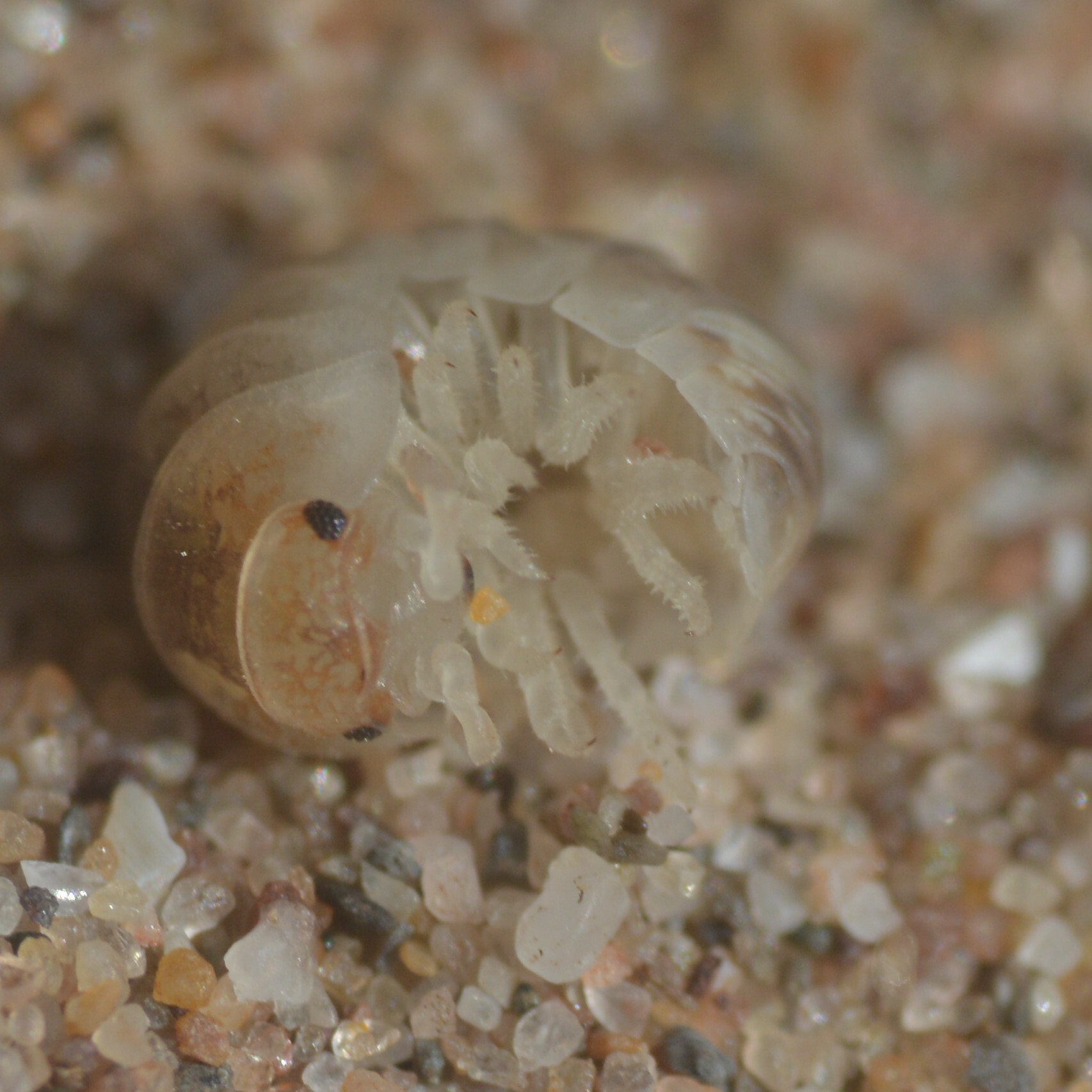

Scientific classification
- Kingdom: Animalia
- Phylum: Arthropoda
- Class: Malacostraca
- Order: Isopoda
- Suborder: Oniscidea
- Family: Armadillidiidae
- Genus: Armadillidium
- Species: A. album

Binomial name
- Armadillidium album Dollfus, 1887

Synonyms
- List: Haloarmadillidium dudichi Arcangeli, 1929

= Armadillidium album =

Species of woodlouse

Armadillidium album, also known as the beach pill woodlouse, is a species of isopod within the family Armadillidiidae. The species is salt tolerant, inhabiting coastal sand dunes and saltmarshes within Europe. They can sometimes be found under driftwood or burrowed within grains of sand of which their colour pattern mimics.

== Description ==
Armadillidium album reach a maximum length of 7 mm, width of 5 mm and possesses pleopodal lungs. The species is poorly pigmented, with a typical mottled sandy colouration adorned on its exoskeleton. When A. album is disturbed it will partly roll up leaving a few pairs of legs protruding to grip the substrate beneath it.

The triangular plate on the anterior surface of the frontal epistome is either flat or slightly concave. Its upper margin only slightly protrudes above the dorsal surface of the head, forming a nearly straight line. The lower lateral margins of the frontal triangle are sharply edged and concave, meeting at a sharp angle to form a vertical ridge. This triangular structure extends beyond the eyes, creating a visible narrow ridge along the frontal margin of the head when viewed from above. A narrow fissure exists between the triangular plate and the head. The upper margin of the triangle is adorned with scattered short hairs.

The head exhibits a strongly curved backward frontal line, which becomes inconspicuous towards the sides. Distinct eyes with black pigment and approximately 12 to 15 ocelli are present. The antennal lobe of the head features a bluntly angular anterior margin. The antennae are relatively short, curving backward and not reaching the end of the first free thoracic segment. The flagellum of the antenna consists of two joints, with the ultimate joint being approximately three times longer than the first.

The upper surfaces of the head, thoracic and abdominal segments, as well as the telson, are covered in numerous minute tubercles, often arranged in longitudinal rows. Each tubercle bears a short, stout seta at its top. The segments' narrow plates known as epimerae lack tubercles but possess microscopically small, reticularly arranged grooves, most prominent at the epimerae. The first free thoracic segment has a slightly curved upward anterior part of the epimera, and its posterolateral angle is somewhat produced with a rounded tip. This distinguishes Armadillidium album from A. pulchellum, where the posterolateral angle of the first free thoracic segment is truncate. The posterolateral angles of the subsequent thoracic segments are broadly rounded in the anterior and become more rectangular in the posterior segments. The anterolateral angle of the second to fifth free thoracic segments is bluntly rounded, while the sixth and seventh segments have a rectangular anterolateral angle. The lateral margins of the thoracic segments are slightly thickened. The abdominal segments are approximately equal in length, with rectangular anterolateral and posterolateral angles on their epimerae.

The telson is distinctly broader than it is long, with straight or slightly convex lateral margins. The posterior margin also appears straight or slightly convex, while the posterolateral angles are bluntly rounded. The posterior margin of the uropodal exopod is slightly convex and features a small incision that houses a hair or small spine, which is stronger than the other hairs along the margin. The upper surface of the exopod often bears tubercles. The endopods, typically short, are frequently concealed beneath the telson.

In males, the ischium of the seventh pereiopod exhibits a straight lower margin with several short spinules. The ischium rapidly broadens before the distal end and bears two spines on the apex of this broadened part, with a third spine positioned some distance before the other two. The upper margin of the ischium has scattered hairs. The first pleopod in male Armadillidium album individuals has a broadly leaf-shaped exopod with a broadly rounded anterior margin. The inner part of the posterior margin terminates in a blunt point. The endopod of the first pleopod is long and regularly curved outward, with a blunt and irregularly shaped apex.

== Distribution and habitat ==
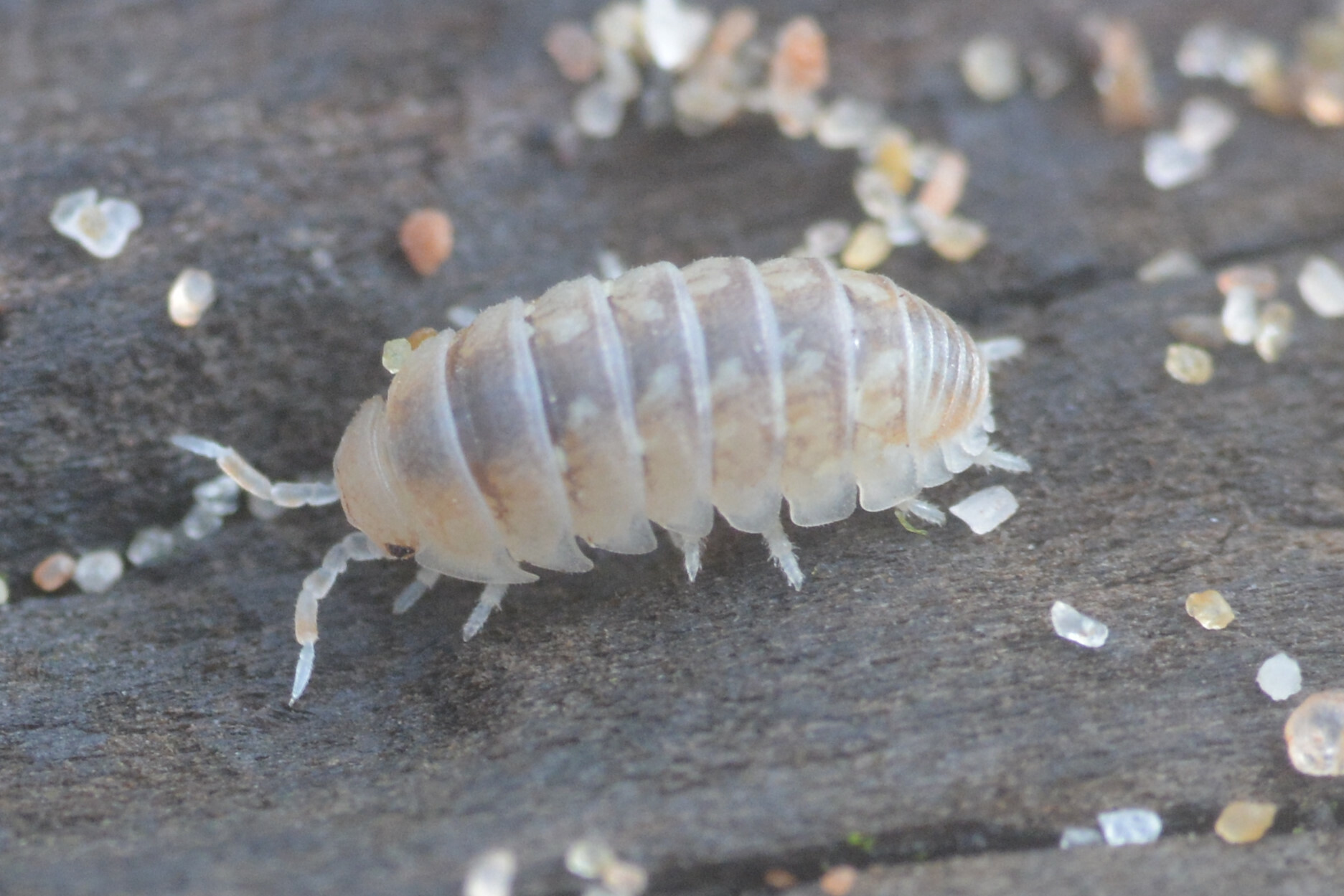
A. album lives inhabits coastal habitats.

Armadillidium album possesses a wide European coastal distribution, where it can be found inhabiting both Temperate and Mediterranean climates. The species has been recorded within coastal habitats of Belgium, France, Greece, Ireland, Italy, Portugal, Spain, the Netherlands and the United Kingdom. It can also be found on the Azores Islands, Balearic Islands, Sardinia, Sicily, and the island of Corsica.

This species is strongly associated with undisturbed coastal sand dune habitats, particularly those with a specific sand grain size. While it can be encountered less frequently in salt marshes, its preferred habitat consists of sandy areas that have been relatively undisturbed. Armadillidium album is often found in close association with storm strandline debris and can be observed clinging to the underside of driftwood, taking refuge within crevices, or even burrowing to depths of 20–30 cm into the underlying sand. The species is highly tolerant to immersion in saltwater, and inhabits the supralittoral zone.

== Reproduction ==
Armadillidium album reproduces sexually, with a summer reproductive period. Reproduction occurs at around 12 months old. The average number of eggs a female carries is eight. Offspring are released from the marsupium brood pouch and require a year to mature to adulthood. The species possesses an average lifespan of two years and produces a maximum of two broods per female.
