= Metatrichoniscoides celticus =

Conservation status
- Near Threatened (IUCN 3.1)

Scientific classification
- Kingdom: Animalia
- Phylum: Arthropoda
- Clade: Pancrustacea
- Class: Malacostraca
- Order: Isopoda
- Suborder: Oniscidea
- Family: Trichoniscidae
- Genus: Metatrichoniscoides
- Species: M. celticus

Binomial name
- Metatrichoniscoides celticus Oliver & Trew, 1981

Species of woodlouse

Metatrichoniscoides celticus, also known as the Celtic Woodlouse, is a species of woodlouse in the family Trichoniscidae. It is an endemic species to the British Isles, and was previously found only on maritime cliffs in the Vale of Glamorgan from Ogmore-by-Sea to St. Donat's, until 2019, when a specimen was discovered on the island of Anglesey in north Wales. In 2020, the species was discovered in England for the first time, found at an allotment in Bristol.

The species is considered Near Threatened by the IUCN Red List, due to its small geographic range. Previous iterations of the list (1990, 1996) have considered this species to be Vulnerable, and any findings of a declining population would qualify this status to be renewed.

== See also ==
- List of woodlice of the British Isles
- List of endemic species of the British Isles
