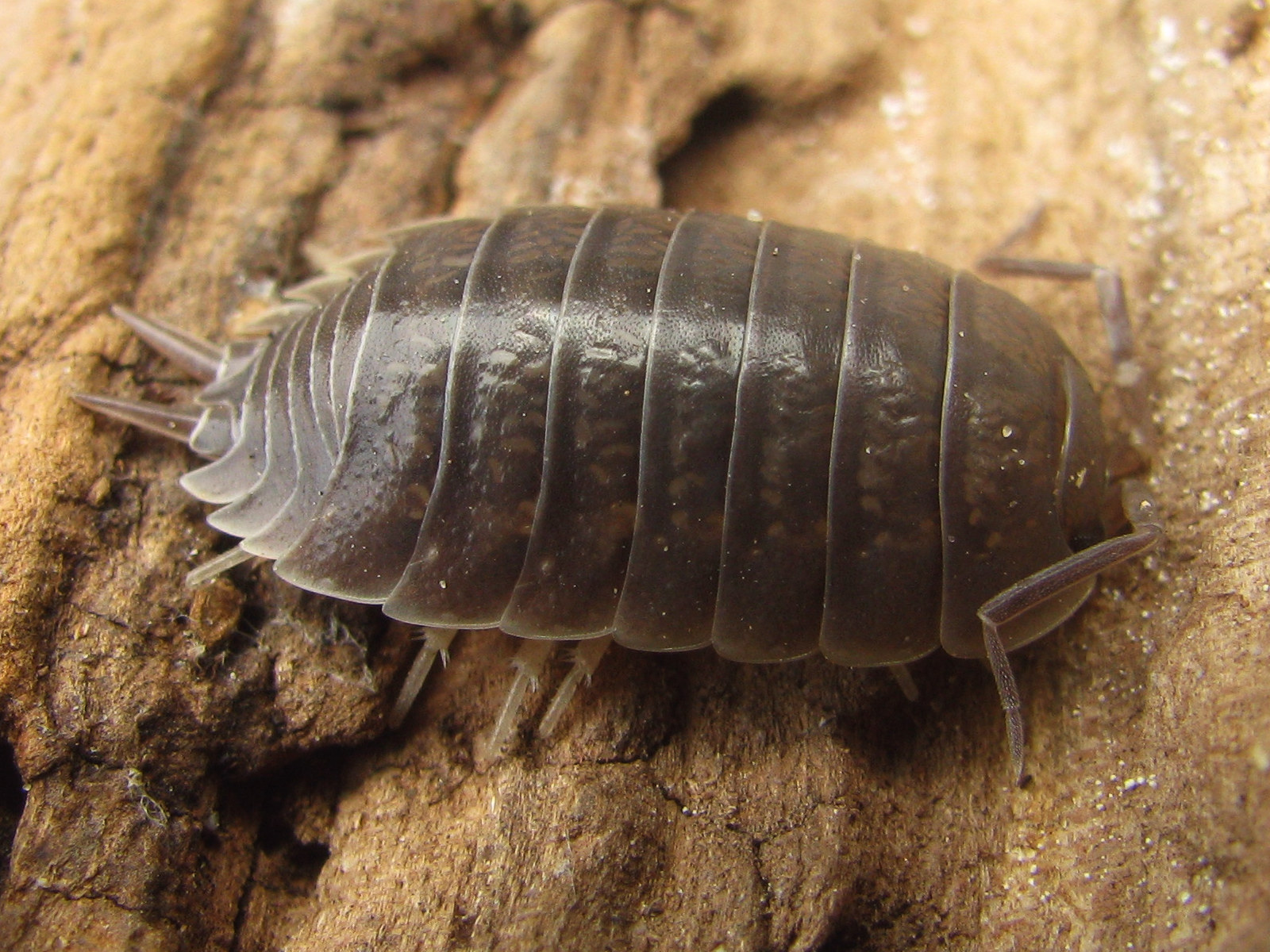

Scientific classification
- Kingdom: Animalia
- Phylum: Arthropoda
- Class: Malacostraca
- Order: Isopoda
- Suborder: Oniscidea
- Family: Porcellionidae
- Genus: Porcellio
- Species: P. laevis

Binomial name
- Porcellio laevis Latreille, 1804

= Porcellio laevis =

Species of woodlouse

Porcellio laevis (commonly called the swift woodlouse, or smooth slater in Australia) is a species of woodlouse in the genus Porcellio. As the species epithet laevis as well as the vernacular name "swift woodlouse" suggests, the species is capable of quick bursts of speed when provoked.

This species of woodlouse is distinctively large, appearing up to 20 millimetres (0.79 in) long with a smooth dorsal surface. The males can be identified by their long, spear-shaped uropods. The smooth dorsal surface of Porcellio laevis separates it visually from many other species in the same genus.

It is commonly kept as a pet due to its somewhat easy care requirements and the variety of color morphs available. The species is easy to keep and can be easily established in a terrarium within a few weeks.

== Distribution and habitat ==
P. laevis was first recorded in Britain in the 13th century but it likely originated in North Africa. It has a cosmopolitan distribution, and has been introduced to Australia, including Norfolk Island and Lord Howe Island. The species is also found in North and South America, Western Asia, Japan and some Pacific islands.

This species is found under rocks and fallen logs in damp areas, and is otherwise rarely encountered. Records from Ireland and Britain also place them in agricultural areas like gardens, farms, and stables where they can be found in dung and compost piles.

== Development and maternal care ==
Porcellio laevis directly develop from yolky eggs. Both the eggs and juveniles develop within a brood pouch called a marsupium until the first juvenile stage. The use of the marsupium eliminates the need for there to be an external water source for early development since it is filled with fluid from the mother isopod. This is considered some of the most extensive parental care among terrestrial arthropods.

== Ecological significance ==
Porcellio laevis plays an important role in nutrient cycling in habitats by breaking down dead plant material and animal waste, and thereby releasing essential nutrients back into the ecosystem. The species is known to be an opportunistic feeder, consuming a wide range of organic matter such as leaves, moss, lichens, and even rotting wood. Therefore, P. laevis can thrive in many different ecological niches. It is also an important food source for many animals, including birds, reptiles, and small mammals. P. laevis have the ability to tolerate and even accumulate heavy metals in their bodies, making the potentially useful in the bioremediation of heavy metal-contaminated soils.

== Behavior ==
Porcellio laevis is one of several species of isopods known to use "alternating turns" as a defense mechanism, running in a mazelike pattern to confuse or avoid perceived threats. Studies suggest that this behavior, also observed in Armadillidium vulgare, can be reinforced as a learned response, with more "alternating turns" produced by longer and more frequent exposure to predators.

== Polymorphism ==
Porcellio laevis is known to exhibit polymorphism. Multiple polymorphic traits have been line-bred or isolated to produce colonies of Porcellio laevis that can vary widely in color and pattern (sometimes referred to informally as "morphs").

Examples of polymorphism in Porcellio laevis
Trait name(s)	Trait type	Description of morph
Dairy Cow Panda Isopod (in Germany)	Recessive	A "piebald" form of Porcellio laevis, with black and white coloration reminiscent of a cow. This piebald form is sometimes referred to as a "dalmatian gene" by those who keep this morph in captivity. It is caused by an absence of pigment in portions of the animal, creating a pattern against the pigmented sections.
White	Recessive	A mutation isolated from the popular "Dairy Cow" morph. This variety is a more extreme expression of the piebald trait, with minimal to no surface area of the animal displaying any pigment; creating an almost entirely white appearance.
Orange	Recessive	A mutation of Porcellio laevis where much of pigment of the animal is orange, rather than a shade of grey seen by the typical Porcellio laevis specimen.

== See also ==
- List of woodlice of the British Isles
