= Oritoniscus flavus =

Scientific classification
- Kingdom: Animalia
- Phylum: Arthropoda
- Class: Malacostraca
- Order: Isopoda
- Suborder: Oniscidea
- Family: Trichoniscidae
- Genus: Oritoniscus
- Species: O. flavus

Binomial name
- Oritoniscus flavus (Budde-Lund, 1906)

Species of woodlouse

Oritoniscus flavus is a species of woodlouse from the family Trichoniscidae, which can be found in Ireland and Wales, and also in eastern Scotland where it was recently discovered. It is a dark purple or maroon colour, and can thus be told apart from the paler Trichoniscus pusillus. It is also, at 8 mm (0.31 in) long, slightly larger. It has a wide head and a tapering body, producing a shape reminiscent of a trilobite.
