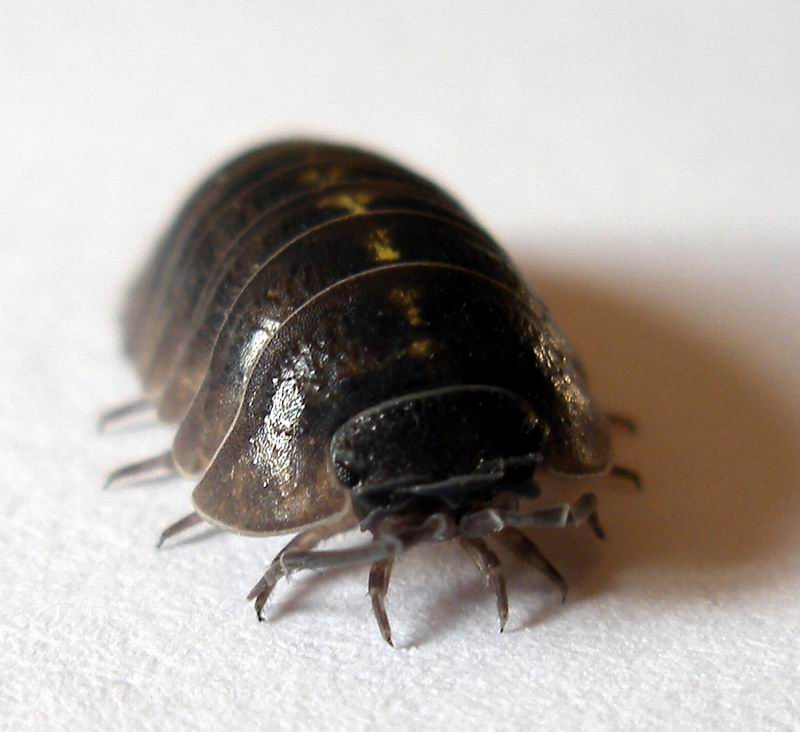
- Armadillidium depressum specimen photographed in Oxford, UK.

Scientific classification
- Kingdom: Animalia
- Phylum: Arthropoda
- Clade: Pancrustacea
- Class: Malacostraca
- Order: Isopoda
- Suborder: Oniscidea
- Family: Armadillidiidae
- Genus: Armadillidium
- Species: A. depressum

Binomial name
- Armadillidium depressum Brandt, 1833
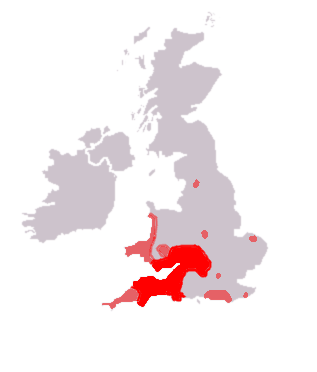
- Range

Synonyms
- Armadillidium gerstaeckeri Armadillidium virescens

= Armadillidium depressum =

Species of woodlouse

Armadillidium depressum, the southern pill woodlouse is a large, relatively common British species of woodlouse characterized by its "splayed" appearance.

== Description ==
Armadillidium depressum may reach a length of 20 millimetres (0.71 in) compared to 18 millimetres for Armadillidium vulgare, and is capable of conglobulating when disturbed. Like Armadillidium nasatum, it can be distinguished from Armadillidium vulgare by the gap it leaves when enrolled, instead of completely enclosing. Another distinguishing feature is that its pleon curve outwards, causing a splayed appearance. Otherwise, the appearance of A. depressum is very similar to A. vulgare in dark grey to black color.

Armadillidium depressum maximum length is 20 millimetres, compared to A. vulgare 18 millimetres.

== Ecology ==
Like other woodlice, Armadillidium depressum feeds on dead plant matter, and lives for 3 years. A. depressum can be seen all year long.

== Distribution ==
The majority of specimens of Armadillidium depressum are concentrated in southwest Britain, near the English Channel, but small populations also occur in various towns scattered throughout England. It is a synanthropic species, living on walls and under stones in towns and old houses. C
