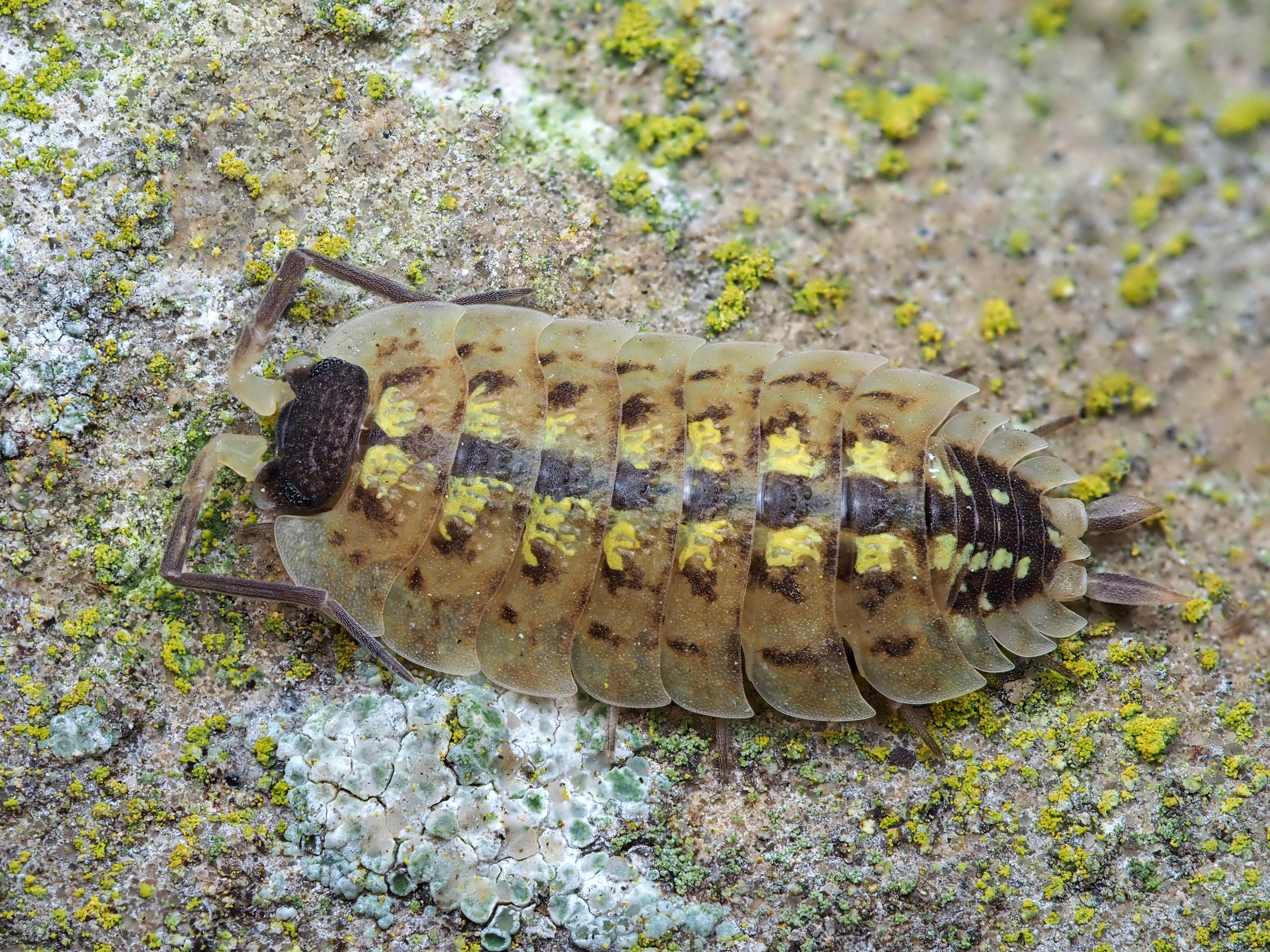

Scientific classification
- Kingdom: Animalia
- Phylum: Arthropoda
- Class: Malacostraca
- Order: Isopoda
- Suborder: Oniscidea
- Family: Porcellionidae
- Genus: Porcellio
- Species: P. spinicornis

Binomial name
- Porcellio spinicornis Say, 1818

= Porcellio spinicornis =

Species of woodlouse

Porcellio spinicornis is a species of woodlouse in the family Porcellionidae. This species is widespread in Europe, and has also been introduced to North America. It has wide spiny frontal lateral lobes.

== Description ==
Porcellio spinicornis is a medium-sized Porcellio species, typically measuring around 10–15mm in length. It has a dark gray, brown, light brown or yellow, with two rows of yellow blotches. The species has a glossy exoskeleton with slight granulation.

There are many different colorations but despite the variety in shape, color, and size, all individuals have dark heads and dark pleons (the last 5 segments).

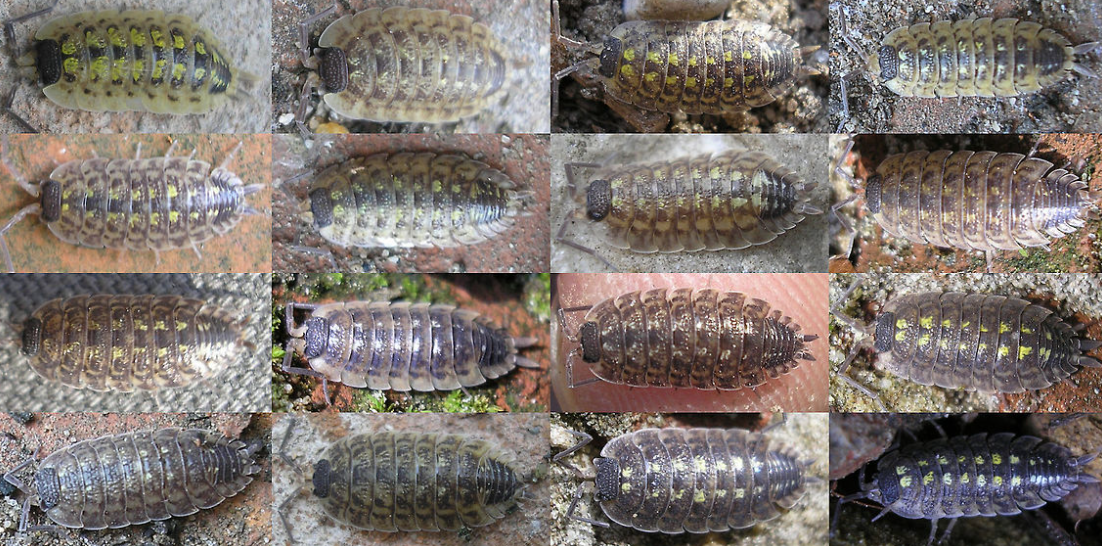
variety of coloration in Porcellio spinicornis

== Habitat and distribution ==
Porcellio spinicornis is found in a variety of habitats across Europe, including forests, grasslands, and rocky areas. It is also found in North America, where it has been introduced. The species has a wide distribution and is considered to be common in many areas.

== Ecology and behavior ==
Porcellio spinicornis is a detritivore, feeding on a wide range of dead plant material, including leaves, twigs, and bark. It is a nocturnal species and is typically active at night.

== Development and maternal care ==
Like all species of Isopoda, Porcellio spinicornis develops directly from yolky eggs. Both the eggs and juveniles develop within a brood pouch called a marsupium until the first juvenile stage. The use of the marsupium eliminates the need for an external water source for early development since it is filled with fluid from the mother isopod.

== Conservation status ==
Porcellio spinicornis is not considered to be a threatened species, and is not listed by the International Union for Conservation of Nature (IUCN) Red List. It has a wide distribution in Europe and North America.

== Taxonomy and nomenclature ==
Porcellio spinicornis was first described in 1818 by Tomas Say. The species name "spinicornis" refers to the spiny frontal lateral lobes of the species.

== Relationships with humans ==
Porcellio spinicornis has been introduced into the Isopod Hobby; however, few morphs have been isolated.
