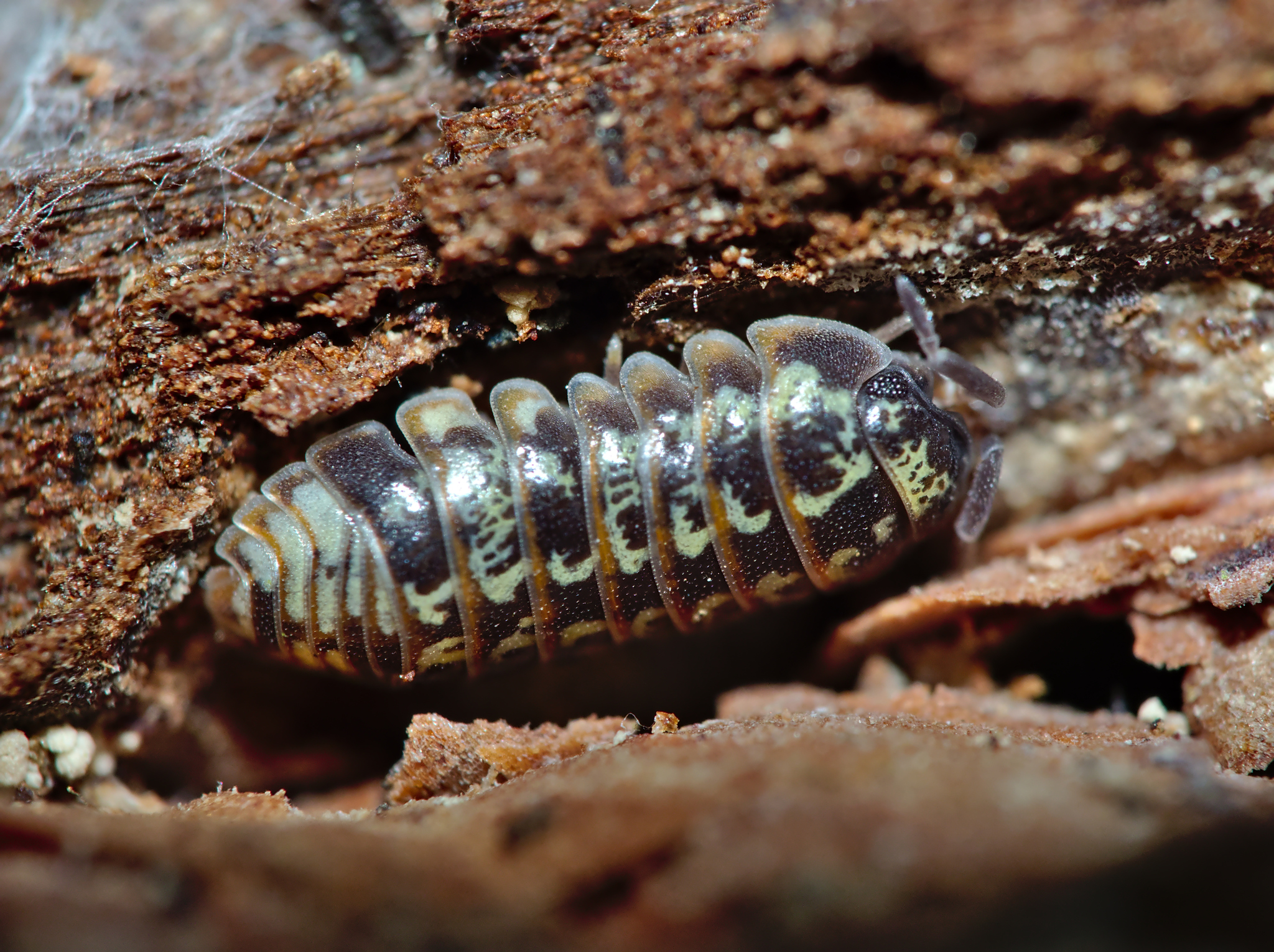

Scientific classification
- Kingdom: Animalia
- Phylum: Arthropoda
- Clade: Pancrustacea
- Class: Malacostraca
- Order: Isopoda
- Suborder: Oniscidea
- Family: Armadillidiidae
- Genus: Armadillidium
- Species: A. pulchellum

Binomial name
- Armadillidium pulchellum (Zenker, 1798)

= Armadillidium pulchellum =

Species of woodlouse

Armadillidium pulchellum is a species of woodlice belonging to the family Armadillidiidae. It is native to Europe.

== Description ==
It only grows to approximately 5 millimetres (0.20 in) in length. It is spotted with yellow dots and often red-brown at the edge of its pereonites. It has a wide telson, which is roundly truncated. Its first pereonite is chamfered, unlike those of other species, like A. vulgare, whose first pereonite is smoothly pointed. Its volvation is not perfect, meaning it leaves a small gap when it rolls up.
