= Armadillidium quinquepustulatum =

Scientific classification
- Kingdom: Animalia
- Phylum: Arthropoda
- Class: Malacostraca
- Order: Isopoda
- Suborder: Oniscidea
- Family: Armadillidiidae
- Genus: Armadillidium
- Species: A. quinquepustulatum

Binomial name
- Armadillidium quinquepustulatum Budde-Lund, 1885
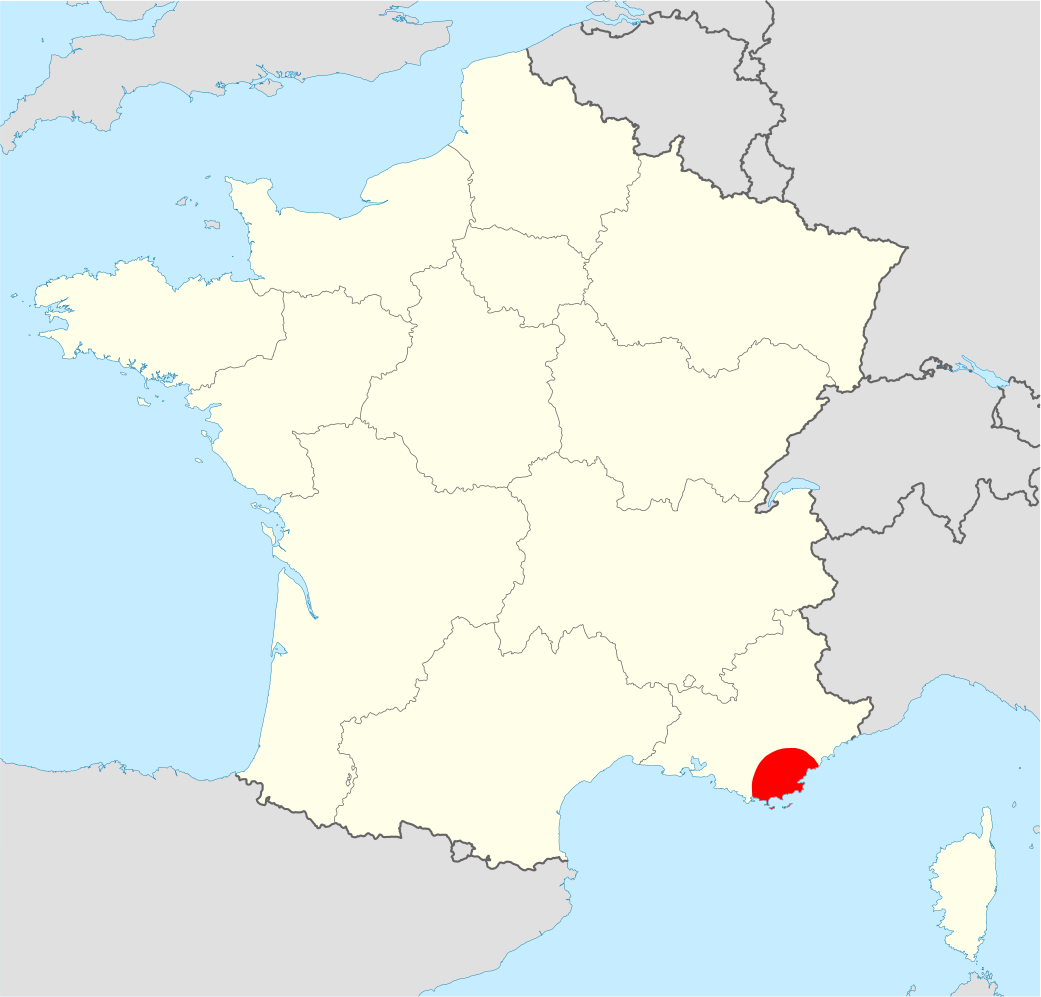
- Distribution of Armadillidium quinquepustulatum (in red)

Species of crustacean

Armadillidium quinquepustulatum is a European species of woodlouse endemic to France. It is a relatively small to medium-sized species that belongs to the so-called "Armadillidium maculatum group".

== Taxonomy ==
Armadilliidum quinquepustulatum belongs to the "Armadillidiae" section of the genus, which is characterized by rib-like side edges of the forehead that never form a "frontal brim" along with the frontal shield, a frontal triangle with lateral edges that never reach the areas of the ocelli, relatively steeply-dropping epimera on all tergites and anterior lobes of the first pair of epimera that are usually either not curved upwards or with a slight hint of a bend. Additionally, the species is a member of the "Armadillidium maculatum group", which itself is divided into two subgroups: the "Eastern subgroup", distributed in Eastern Europe and the Balkans and containing 5 species (A. albomarginatum, A. bulgaricum, A. flavoscutatum, A. klugii and A. narentanum) and the "Western subgroup", distributed in Italy, France and the Iberian Peninsula which contains another 5 species (A. assimile, A. esterelanum, A. maculatum, A. quinquepustulatum and A. simoni).

== Description ==
Armadillidium quinquepustulatum is a small to medium-sized species, reaching maximum dimensions of about 12–14 mm in length. Its tergites are covered with numerous, tightly placed, flat granulations. The coloration of the body is uniformly grey, dotted with white spots. These spots are reminiscent in arranging and coloration with those of the sympatric A. esterelanum, but tend to be smaller in size. The arranging of the spots on the body is as following: one spot occurs in the middle of the posterior margin of the head, 5 or 7 pairs occur on each pereion-tergite (a middle one, 1-2 lateral pairs and 1 pair of elongated spots at the tergum-epimeron border) and a few, irregularly placed spots occur on the pleon. The frontal shield slightly surpasses the anterior edge of the head. The head itself has a large, rounded pit in the middle, immediately behind the frontal shield, and bears quatrangular antennae lobes. The hind margins of the first pair of epimera have arch-like angles. The telson is triangular and has a truncated tip.

Concerning the sexual characters of the male, the ischium of the seventh pereiopod is ventrally slightly concave, covered with dense velvety hairs and decorated at its apical part with a hair field and 8-9 spiked bristles. The posterior lobe of the exopodite of the first pleopod is triangular with a rounded apex.

== Distribution ==
Armadillidium quinquepustulatum is endemic to southeastern France. Specifically, it is restricted to the area of the Massif des Maures and the nearby Îles d'Hyères.

== Ecology ==
Armadillidium quinquepustulatum prefers to live in hot, dry locations and in sandy soils rather than forested regions. It also seems to be very common in its restricted range.
