= Armadillidium stolikanum =

Scientific classification
- Kingdom: Animalia
- Phylum: Arthropoda
- Clade: Pancrustacea
- Class: Malacostraca
- Order: Isopoda
- Suborder: Oniscidea
- Family: Armadillidiidae
- Genus: Armadillidium
- Species: A. stolikanum

Binomial name
- Armadillidium stolikanum Verhoeff, 1907

Species of crustacean

Armadillidium stolikanum is a European species of woodlouse endemic to Greece.

== Taxonomy ==
Armadilliidum stolikanum was described in 1907, based on only 2 female specimens that were allegedly collected in the Central Greek regional unit of Aitolia-Akarnania. It belongs to the "Armadillidiae" section of the genus, which is characterized by rib-like side edges of the forehead that never form a "frontal brim" along with the frontal shield, a frontal triangle with lateral edges that never reach the areas of the ocelli, relatively steeply-dropping epimera on all tergites and anterior lobes of the first pair of epimera that are usually either not curved upwards or with a slight hint of a bend. Additionally, the species is considered a member of the "Armadillidium granulatum group", based on the presence of strong granulations on the tergites.

== Description ==
Armadillidium stolikanum is a medium to large sized species, reaching maximum dimensions of about 13 x 7 mm. Its tergites are strongly granulated. The natural coloration of the body is unknown, as both specimens are depigmented, probably as a result of their long-time preservation in ethanol. The frontal shield surpasses the anterior edge of the head and has a straight upper margin. Behind it, on the head, there is a narrow transverse gap. The secondary antennae have trapezoidal lobes that bend strongly backwards. The hind margins of the first pair of epimera are rounded. The telson is slightly wider than long, with straight sides and a narrowly rounded apex.

== Distribution ==
Armadillidium stolikanum is only known from the type series, collected in Western Greece. Specifically, the two known females were collected by Verhoeff in the area of "Stoliko", which most probably is a misspelling of the town or former municipality of Aitoliko, near Missolonghi.
