= Armadillidium stymphalicum =

Scientific classification
- Kingdom: Animalia
- Phylum: Arthropoda
- Class: Malacostraca
- Order: Isopoda
- Suborder: Oniscidea
- Family: Armadillidiidae
- Genus: Armadillidium
- Species: A. stymphalicum

Binomial name
- Armadillidium stymphalicum Schmalfuss, 2006
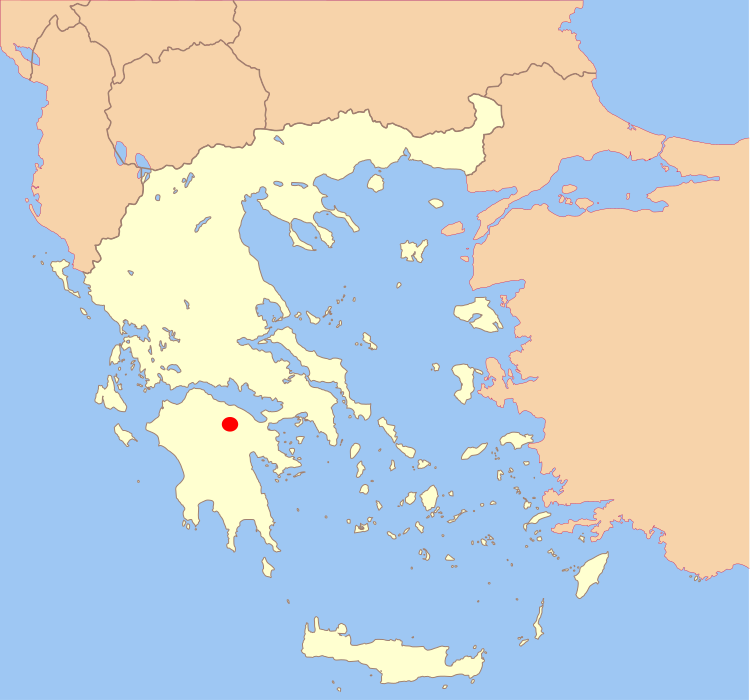
- Distribution of Armadillidium stymphalicum (in red)

Species of crustacean

Armadillidium stymphalicum is a European species of woodlouse endemic to Greece.

== Taxonomy ==
Armadilliidum stymphalicum was described in 2006, based on specimens that were collected as far back as 1960. It belongs to the "Marginiferae" section of the genus, which is characterized by side edges of the forehead that bend upwards into distinct lobes. These lobes lie against the frontal shield and together with it form a "frontal brim". Additionally, the species is believed to be closely related to A. frontemarginatum, from which it can be separated by the structure of the head and the shape of the ischium of the seventh pereiopod of the male.

== Description ==
Armadillidium stymphalicum is a medium to large sized species, reaching maximum dimensions of about 18 x 7.5 mm. Its tergites are granulated, dark grey and decorated with small yellow spots at the attachment sites of the thoracic muscles. The frontal shield surpasses the anterior edge of the head, bears a deep groove caudally and has rounded lateral angels. The side edges of the forehead bend upwards into high, rounded lobes that don't reach the height of the frontal shield. The secondary antennae are long and slender, have triangular lobes and flagellum articles of about the same length. The hind margins of the first pair of epimera are conspicuously angled. The telson is as wide as long, has straight sides and a rounded tip.

Concerning the sexual characters of the male, the first pereiopod has a ventral brush of spines on the carpus and the ischium of the seventh pereiopod is ventrally straight, decorated with a hair field at its apical part. The posterior lobe of the exopodite of the first pleopod is triangular with a rounded tip and the apex of the endopodite is straight .

== Distribution ==
Armadillidium stymphalicum is only known from the Greek regional unit of Corinthia in northeastern Peloponnese. Particularly, the species is endemic to Mount Kyllini and some nearby regions.

== Ecology ==
Almost nothing is known about the ecology of Armadillidium stymphalicum. However, most specimens have been collected around the shores of the two biggest lakes of the region, Stymphalia and Doxa.
