= Armadillidium sfenthourakisi =

Scientific classification
- Kingdom: Animalia
- Phylum: Arthropoda
- Class: Malacostraca
- Order: Isopoda
- Suborder: Oniscidea
- Family: Armadillidiidae
- Genus: Armadillidium
- Species: A. sfenthourakisi

Binomial name
- Armadillidium sfenthourakisi Schmalfuss, 2008
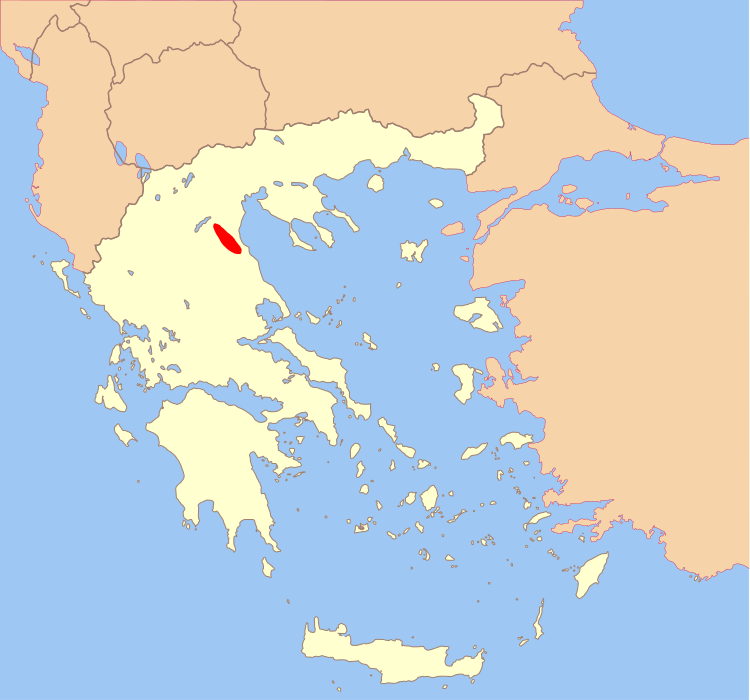
- Distribution of Armadillidium sfenthourakisi (in red)

Species of crustacean

Armadillidium sfenthourakisi is a European species of woodlouse endemic to Greece.

== Taxonomy ==
Armadilliidum sfenthourakisi was described as a distinct species of Armadillidium in 2008, using specimens collected from the surroundings of Mount Olympus. Until now, its true affinities aren't known, but, based on the shape of the telson, it is speculated that its closest relatives are the members of the Western Greek "Armadillidium jonicum-group" (A. jonicum and A. epiroticum).

== Description ==
Armadillidium sfenthourakisi is a medium to large sized species, reaching maximum dimensions of about 17 x 6.7 mm. Its tergites are covered with granulations and the coloration of the body is uniformly blackish-gray in adults and brownish in juveniles. The frontal shield surpasses the anterior edge of the head, has a straight upper margin and obtuse lateral corners. The secondary antennae are very slender, with triangular lobes and the flagellum articles are of about the same length. The hind margins of the first pair of epimera are obtuse-angled. The telson is distinctly longer than wide and has straight sides and a broadly rounded tip.

Concerning the sexual characters of the male, the first pereiopod has a brush of short spines on the carpus and the seventh pereiopod a ventrally straight ischium. The latter, has a distal hair-field at its apical part. The posterior lobe of the exopodite of the first pleopod is triangular and the apex of the endopodite is straight .

== Distribution ==
Armadillidium sfenthourakisi is endemic to Pieria and Larissa. Specifically, until now, the species has been found only in the regions surrounding and encompassing Mount Olympus in Pieria and the Vale of Tempe in Larissa.

== Ecology ==
Armadillidium sfenthourakisi specimens have been collected from two types of habitat: mixed forests and maquis.
