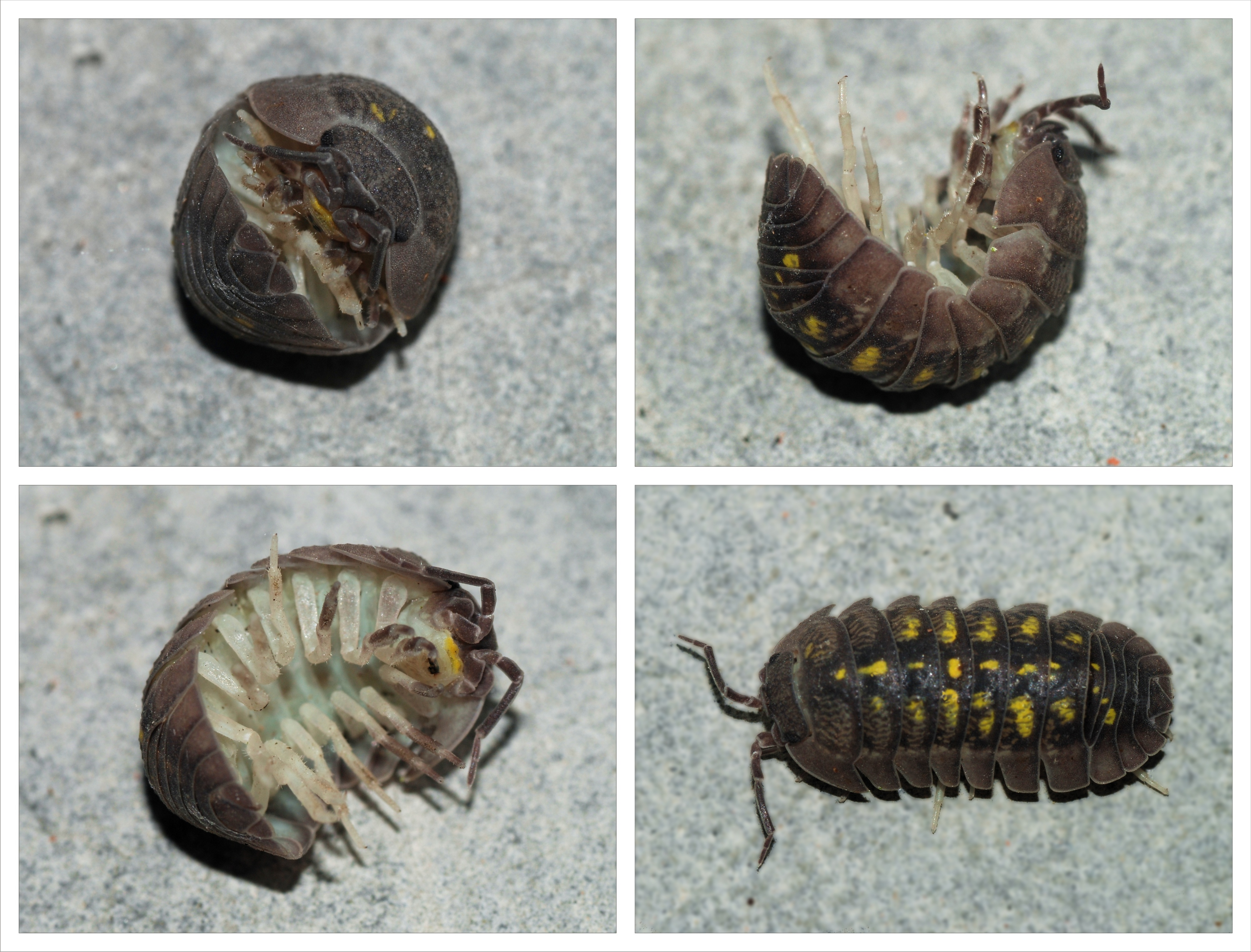
- Various angles and poses, photographed in Portugal

Scientific classification
- Kingdom: Animalia
- Phylum: Arthropoda
- Clade: Pancrustacea
- Class: Malacostraca
- Order: Isopoda
- Suborder: Oniscidea
- Family: Armadillidiidae
- Genus: Armadillidium
- Species: A. granulatum

Binomial name
- Armadillidium granulatum Brandt, 1833

= Armadillidium granulatum =

Species of woodlouse

Armadillidium granulatum, also known as the granulated pill woodlouse, is a species of woodlouse.

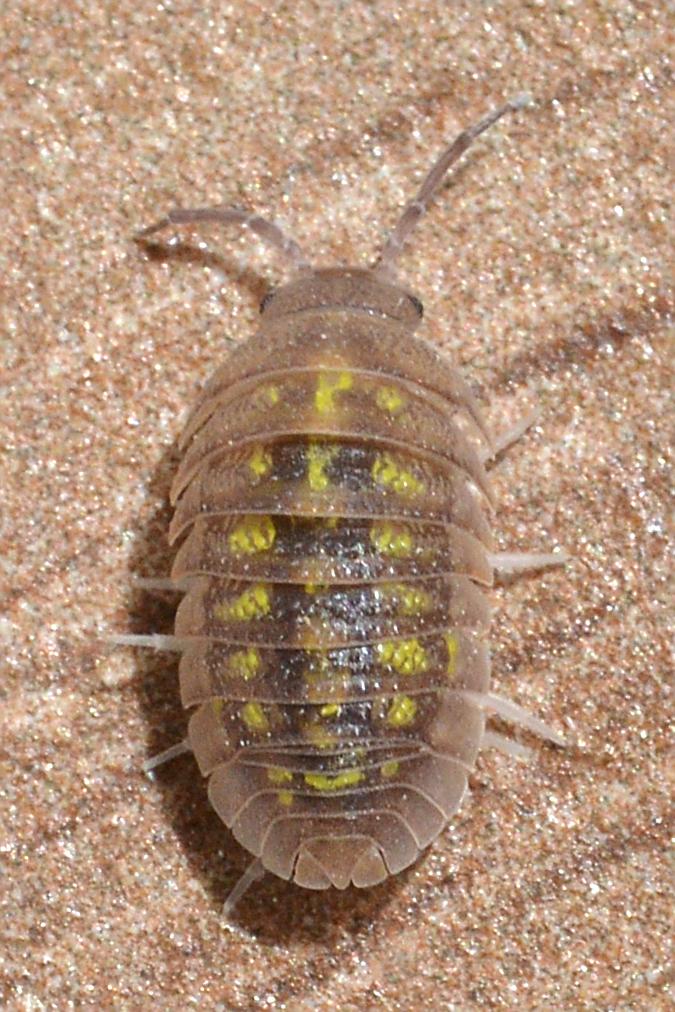
Specimen, photographed in Mallorca

It is among the largest of the Armadillidium species, capable of reaching a maximum size of around 22.8 mm (0.90 in), rivaling that of Armadillidium gestroi.
