= Armadillidium maniatum =

Scientific classification
- Kingdom: Animalia
- Phylum: Arthropoda
- Class: Malacostraca
- Order: Isopoda
- Suborder: Oniscidea
- Family: Armadillidiidae
- Genus: Armadillidium
- Species: A. maniatum

Binomial name
- Armadillidium maniatum Schmalfuss, 2006
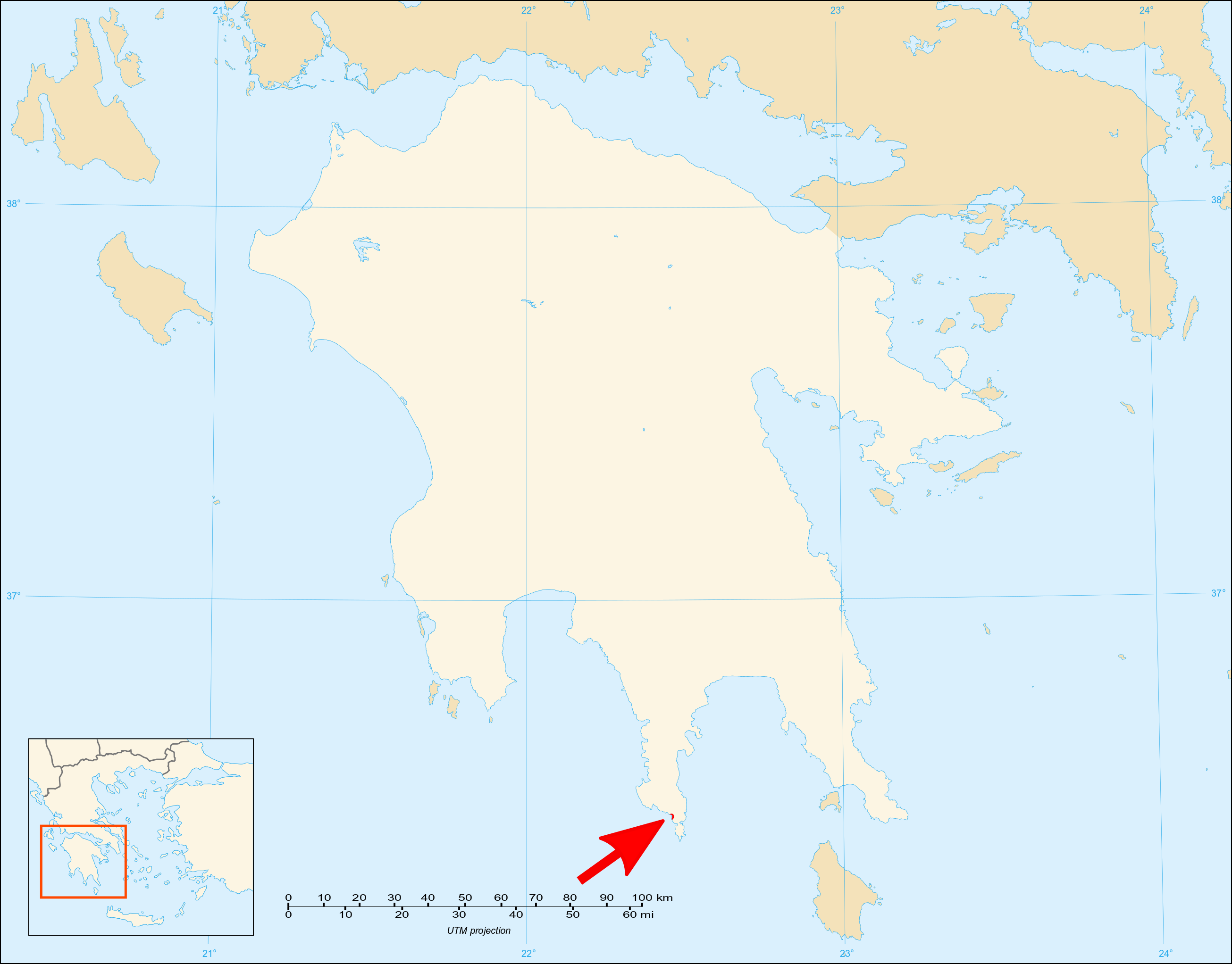
- Distribution of Armadillidium maniatum (in red)

Species of crustacean

Armadillidium maniatum is a European species of woodlouse endemic to Greece.

== Taxonomy ==
Armadilliidum maniatum was described in 2006, based on only 3 specimens (2 males and 1 female) that were collected in a beach of southern Peloponnese during May 1980.

== Description ==
Armadillidium maniatum is a medium to large sized species, reaching maximum dimensions of about 17 x 8.7 mm. Its tergites are completely smooth and the body lacks pigmentation, except for the eyes, which are black, and the hind margins of the pereion-tergites, which bear dark stripes. The frontal shield doesn't surpass the anterior edge of the head, distinctly bends backwards and tightly fits to the frontal part of the head. The secondary antennae have a conspicuously enlarged third segment, trapezoidal lobes and flagellum articles of equal length. The hind margins of the first pair of epimera are deeply and sharply angled. The telson is wider than long, has straight sides and a rounded tip.

Concerning the sexual characters of the male, the first pereiopod has a ventral brush of spines on the carpus and, to a lesser degree, on the merus. The ischium of the seventh pereiopod is ventrally straight, bare at the apical part and with a proximal band of hairy setae at its basal part. The coxopodite of the same leg has a stripe of hairs at its middle part. The posterior lobe of the exopodite of the first pleopod is triangular and the apex of the endopodite is straight .

== Distribution ==
Armadillidium maniatum is only known from the type series, collected in southern Peloponnese. Particularly, the species was found in the beach of Vatheia, which comprises one of the southernmost regions of the Mani Peninsula.

== Ecology ==
Almost nothing is known about the ecology of Armadillidium maniatum. Based on the habitat where the type series was collected (beach) and the almost complete lack of pigmentation, it is speculated that the species lives an endogean type of life. Armadillidium album, another rarely encountered littoral species of the genus, shows the same combination of characters (decreased pigmentation and endogean type of life), supporting this hypothesis.
