= Armadillidium ruffoi =

Scientific classification
- Kingdom: Animalia
- Phylum: Arthropoda
- Class: Malacostraca
- Order: Isopoda
- Suborder: Oniscidea
- Family: Armadillidiidae
- Genus: Armadillidium
- Species: A. ruffoi

Binomial name
- Armadillidium ruffoi Arcangeli, 1940
- Distribution of Armadillidium ruffoi (in red)

Species of crustacean

Armadillidium ruffoi is a European species of woodlouse endemic to Italy.

== Taxonomy ==
Armadilliidum ruffoi belongs to the "Marginiferae" section of the genus, which is characterized by side edges of the forehead that bend upwards into distinct lobes. These lobes lie against the frontal shield and together with it form a "frontal brim". Additionally, the species is thought to be closely related to the probably sympatric A. germanicum or even conspecific with it, consisting its southernmost variety.

== Description ==
Armadillidium ruffoi is a medium-sized species, reaching maximum dimensions of about 16 × 6.5 mm. Its tergites are shiny and smooth or covered with a few small granulations at their posterior parts. The coloration of the body consists of a faded gray background, decorated with irregular whitish spots. These spots form three longitudinal rows, of which the median one tends to be more pronounced. Additionally, a spot occurs in the middle of the posterior margin of the head. The epimera are irregularly brightened and have whitish corners. The frontal shield surpasses the anterior edge of the head, has a slightly convex upper margin, and lateral angles that are almost right. The head itself has a distinct longitudinal groove in the middle, immediately behind the frontal shield, that is delimited in each side by two low ridges. The side edges of the forehead bend upwards into distinct lobes that are never as high as the frontal shield and lie against it. The secondary antennae have medium-sized, triangular lobes with rounded upper margins. The hind margins of the first pair of epimera are obtuse-angled. The telson has straight sides and a broadly truncated tip.

Concerning the sexual characters of the male, the seventh pereiopod has a ventrally straight ischium, decorated with a hair field at its apical part. The posterior lobe of the exopodite of the first pleopod is triangular and acute .

== Distribution ==
Armadillidium ruffoi is endemic to Northern Italy. Specifically, until now, all the known specimens have been collected in the Province of Verona.

== Ecology ==
Almost nothing is known about the ecology of Armadillidium ruffoi. However, the type series consists of specimens collected in and around caves.
