= Armadillidium teramense =

Scientific classification
- Kingdom: Animalia
- Phylum: Arthropoda
- Class: Malacostraca
- Order: Isopoda
- Suborder: Oniscidea
- Family: Armadillidiidae
- Genus: Armadillidium
- Species: A. teramense

Binomial name
- Armadillidium teramense Verhoeff, 1933
- Distribution of Armadillidium teramense (in red)

Species of crustacean

Armadillidium teramense is a European species of woodlouse endemic to Italy. It belongs to the "Orthotrigoniae" section of the genus and is currently known only from the type series.

== Taxonomy ==
Armadilliidum teramense was described as a distinct species of Armadillidium in 1933, based on specimens collected from the Province of Teramo. It belongs to the "Orthotrigoniae" section of the genus, which is characterized by rib-like side edges of the forehead that never form a "frontal brim" along with the frontal shield, a frontal triangle with an upper margin that lies on the horizontal continuation of the head and anterior lobes of the first pair of epimera that bend upwards.

== Description ==
Armadillidium teramense is a medium-sized species, reaching maximum dimensions of about 15.3 mm in length. Its tergites are completely smooth and kind-of matte. The coloration of the body is uniformly grey all over its upper surface. The frontal shield doesn't surpass the anterior edge of the head, is tightly pressed against it (leaving only a small gap visible), has a nearly straight upper margin and doesn't bear lateral angles. The secondary antennae have thick lobes that don't bend backwards and are deeply furrowed in an arch at their posterior surface. The hind margins of the first pair of epimera have pronounced, deep, obtuse angles. The telson is triangular and has a narrowly rounded tip.

Concerning the sexual characters of the male, the seventh pereiopod is slightly indented ventrally and decorated with a hair-field at its apical part. The posterior lobe of the exopodite of the first pleopod is triangular and the apex of the endopodite bends slightly outwards.

== Distribution ==
Armadillidium terramense is endemic to Southern Italy. Specifically, until now, all the known specimens have been collected in the Province of Teramo.

== Ecology ==
Almost nothing is known about the ecological preferences and biology of Armadillidium teramense. The only known details concern the collection data of the type series, which was found under sandstones on loamy-sandy soil, on the desolate, grassy mountain slopes of Teramo.
