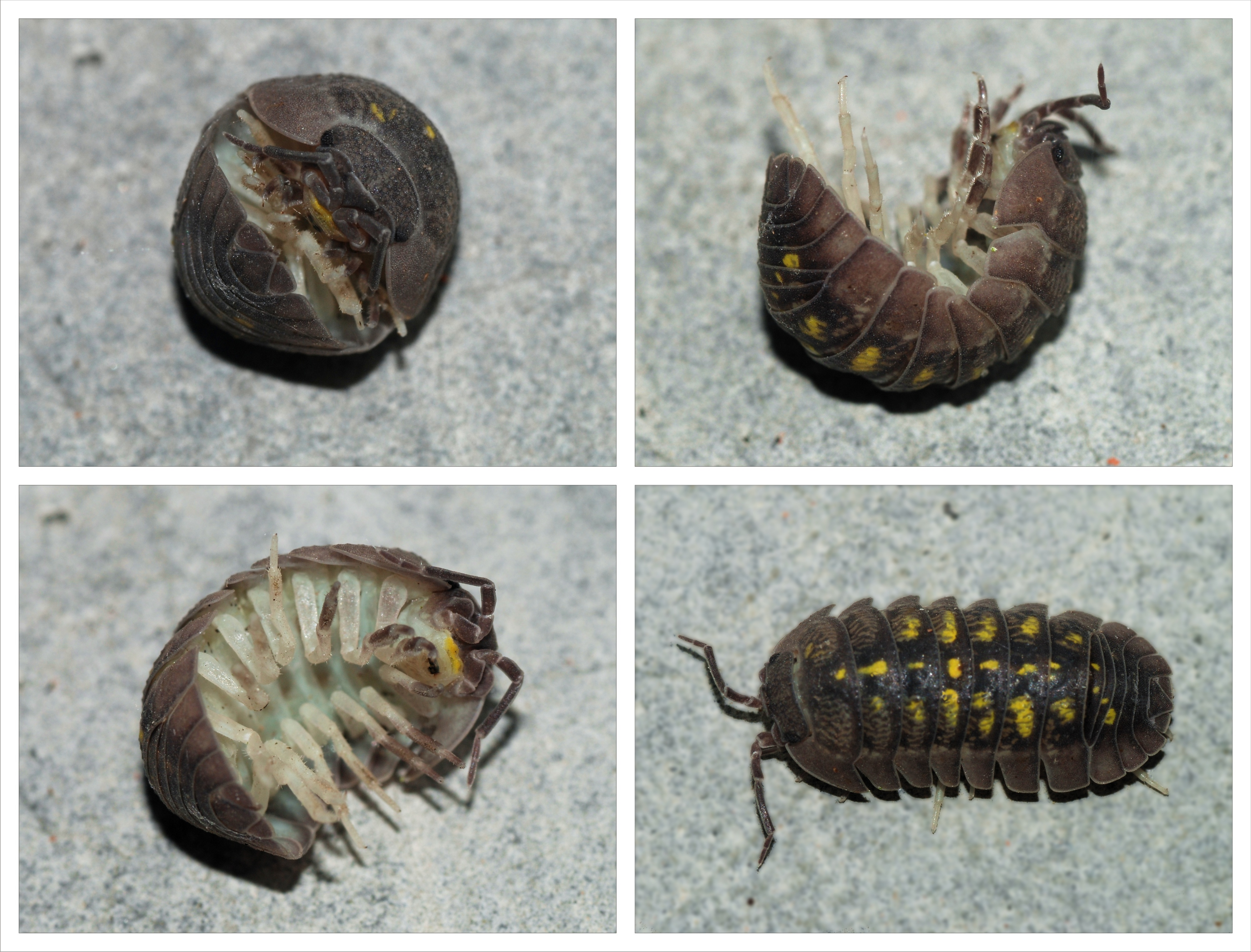
- An Armadillidium granulatum in its roll-up stages, also known as conglobation stages.

Scientific classification
- Kingdom: Animalia
- Phylum: Arthropoda
- Clade: Pancrustacea
- Class: Malacostraca
- Order: Isopoda
- Suborder: Oniscidea
- Family: Armadillidiidae
- Genus: Armadillidium; Brandt, 1833

Diversity
- 189 species

= Armadillidium =

Genus of woodlice

Armadillidium (/ɑːrmədɪˈlɪdiəm/) is a genus of the small terrestrial crustacean known as the woodlouse. It is one of 18 genera nested within the family Armadillidiidae. Armadillidium is also one of the groups commonly known as pill woodlice, leg pebbles, pill bugs, roly-poly, or potato bugs, and are often confused with pill millipedes such as Glomeris marginata. They are characterised by their ability to roll into a ball ("volvation") when disturbed.

With a penchant for damp and dark places, species in the Armadillidium genus can typically be found under rocks, in leaf litter, and in or around the soil. Aided by their dorsoventrally flattened body and small size – usually growing no bigger than 2.5 cm – these pill bugs are able to squeeze into tight cracks and are common household pests as a result.

== Description ==
Unlike other terrestrial arthropods such as insects and spiders, pill bugs do not have a waxy cuticle that would reduce evaporation from their bodies. Pill bugs also use modified lungs, called pseudotrachea, for respiration, and the lungs must remain moist to function. Individual pill bugs typically live for two or three years, and females brood eggs once or twice each summer. In larger species and individuals, up to over a hundred eggs are brooded at a time in the marsupium, a pocket on the ventral side of the female pill bug. The marsupium provides nutrients and oxygen to the eggs until they hatch, resulting in something akin to live birth.

The colouration, especially of young A. klugii resembles the red hourglass marking of the Mediterranean black widow Latrodectus tredecimguttatus. It has been proposed to be a result of Batesian mimicry, to ward off predators that mistake the harmless animal for a venomous spider.

== Behaviour ==
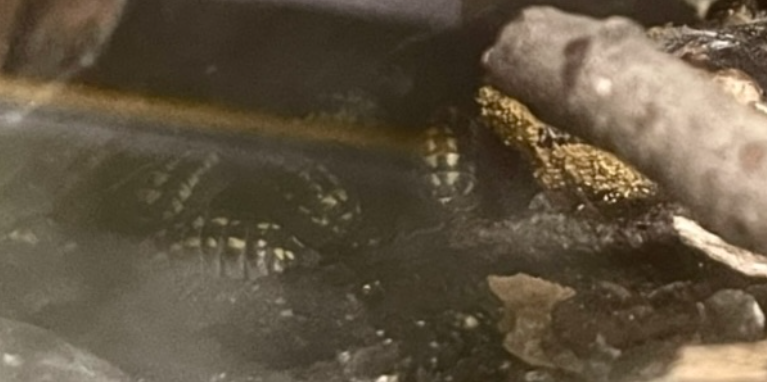
Armadillidium gestroi (Yellow Spotted Isopod) hiding under bark. Picture taken at the University of Alberta.

Pill bugs in the genus Armadillidium are characterized by their ability to roll up into a ball when alarmed. However, this is not their greatest defense, instead, their tendency to seek out dark, cramped spaces and hide during the day is what serves as a deterrent to being preyed upon in the first place. Armadillidium are also susceptible to drowning due to flooding and storms, and as such will move to high places such as trees to avoid this. In cases of extremely hot and dry environments, they are also known to avoid these conditions by moving underground or deeper into soil. Although they don't appear to move very fast, when in search of food during the summer time, some species have been known to travel up to 13 meters in only half a day. However, during winter, that travel rate is significantly reduced.

== Identification ==
There are some morphological features that when seen together, help to identify members of Armadillidium from other closely related groups. These include:

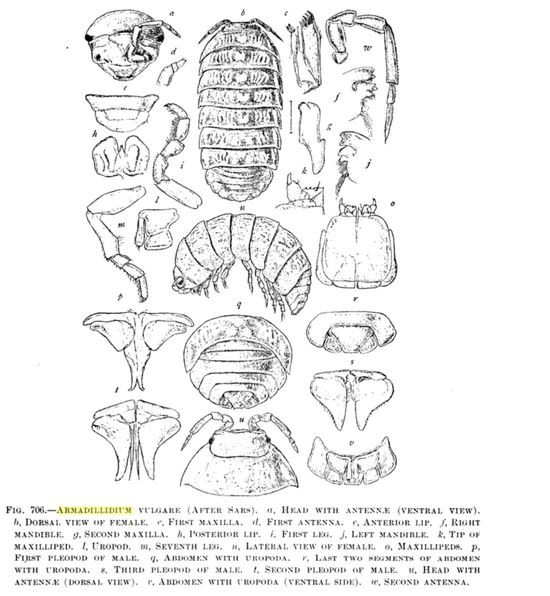
The anatomy of Armadillidium vulgare as depicted in A Monograph on the Isopods of North America by Harriet Richardson

- Ability to roll into a ball
- Convex oblong body shape
- Multiple black ocelli (small, simple eyes)
- Size range of 5mm - 25mm
- Small first set of antennae, second set of antennae is approximately equal to half the length of the body
- Epistome passes the frontal edge, is vertically directed, and often triangular in shape
- Short clypeus that is not lobate, and with a slightly wavy anterior margin towards the mid-line
- End segment of the abdomen either triangular or rectangular
- Tracheae present on the opercular plates of the first two pairs of pleopoda
- Short uropods

== Feeding habits and diet ==
Pill bugs in the genus Armadillidium are primarily detritophagous omnivores, with a few instances of animal matter consumption. They primarily feed on decaying organic matter like leaves, decomposed wood fibers, and less commonly on other organic material like lichen. They are capable of switching feeding strategies, changing from herbivory to scavenging when plants become scarce, such as during especially dry periods.

Although they mainly feed on plant matter, they are also known to eat their own fecal pellets – a process called coprophagy – as well as those of other organisms. By eating their own fecal matter, as well as other organisms’, it serves as an opportunity to digest items a second time and break them down further. It has also been proven that the rate of growth of Armadillidium can be stunted if they stopped eating feces, which accounts for around 1/10th of their diet.

When presented with options, some species of Armadillidium have displayed a feeding preference for certain plants, such as A. vulgare preferring thistle, tarweed, and vetch over other leaves.

Copper is an important nutrient for Armadillidium, as it is crucial in the transportation of oxygen through their body. Just as humans have hemoglobin to carry oxygen, Armadillidium have hemocyanin, which uses copper to bind and transport oxygen. Because copper is important in this movement of oxygen, pill bugs that are deficient in copper will target foods that have higher amounts of copper. However, those with sufficient copper levels will choose foods with lower amounts of the metal.

== Distribution and habitat ==
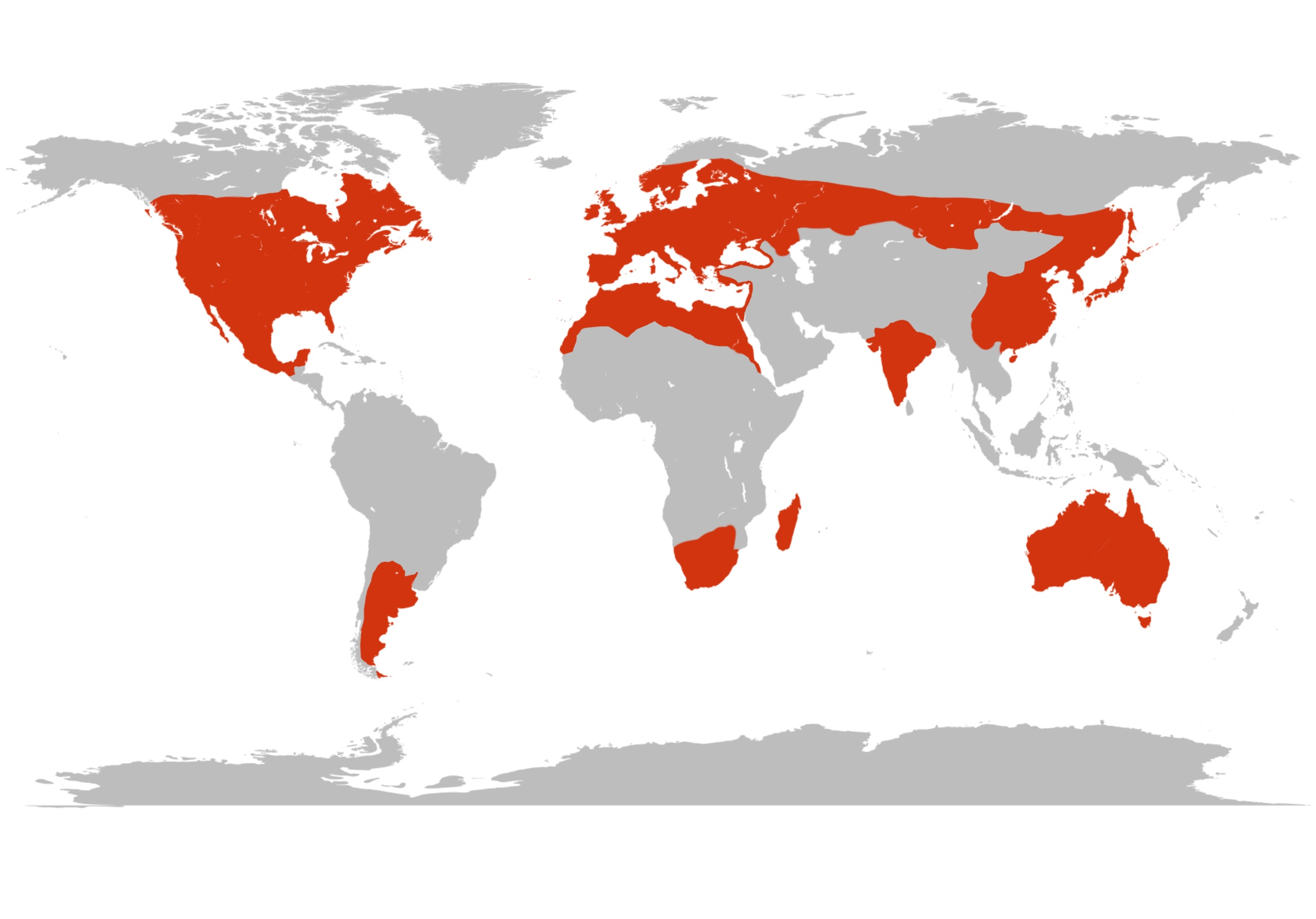
Global distribution map of Armadillidium species, highlighting their presence in temperate regions across North America, Europe, parts of Asia, southern South America, southern Africa, and Australia (in red).

Armadillidium are nocturnal, being most active during the night. They are usually found in moist areas such as decomposing leaf matter and soil. They can also be found in shaded nooks and crannies, such as those created by rocks. They typically live in places that are temperate in climate and have moist soil. Armadillidium vulgare is the most abundant species in Europe, with a native distribution spanning from England to Russia, and has been introduced to several countries worldwide. Currently, there are large populations of A. vulgare within the US after being introduced to California. There are also A. vulgare populations present in Madagascar, South Africa, Australia, Canada, and Japan. However, the vast majority of species are endemic to small regions close to the Mediterranean Sea, in much lower numbers than common species such as A. vulgare, and hence are understudied.

== Physiology ==
Typically, land animals utilize uric acid to excrete their waste as a way to save water and reduce dangerous substances, however, Armadillidium are able to excrete their nitrogenous waste as ammonia gas – a more toxic substance than other forms of waste. They don't experience any negative effects from this toxic form and are able to excrete their waste without losing any water. Although they do lose lots of hydrogen, which could impact their water balance so that there isn't any large difference in terms of saving water via ammonia gas.

Although they have high amounts of copper and ammonia, both of which are extremely toxic, in their systems, they don't experience any adverse effects. This has led researchers to believe that the toxicity doesn't interfere with any important body functions, they have developed resistances, or that they have developed ways to store these substances without harming themselves.

Armadillidium can also produce pungent fluids, which serve as deterrents for potential predators. Located on the dorsal surface along their body segments are glands that produce the repugnant secretions.

Armadillidium breathe through pseudotracheae: white, bean-shaped structures, located on the first two segments of the isopod's abdomen which help them to respire in air.

Armadillidium have a simple digestive system with a straight tube for a gut and only two pairs of digestive glands. Pill bugs compensate for their inefficient digestive system by engaging in coprophagy, where they consume their own feces in order to extraxt the maxomum amount of nutrients from the organic matter they consume. About 9% of the Armadillidium diet is feces.

Armadillidium prefer to have something touching them on all sides, which leads to them aggregating with each other as well as huddling under rocks and in tight spaces.

An important part of Armadillidum defence is the ability to roll into a ball, called conglobation, to protect their soft, exposed underside. The breeding season can affect a female's ability to roll into a ball because the marsupium can become distended with the amount of young they carry. The female's ball form will not be fully complete, leading to an increased predation risk.

=== Chemoreception ===
Some species of Armadillidium, such as A. vulgare, are known to emit scents and have chemoreceptors located in the antennae to detect them.

Some Armadillidium are capable of producing pheromones that are released in their feces, attracting others of the same species. These pheromones, also found in sections of the gut, are for species aggregation, which makes it easier for individuals to find mates. Along with producing their own aggregation pheromones, some Armadillidium respond to odors from other species as well as their own when searching for shelter.

=== Response to temperature, humidity, and transpiration ===
The behaviour of Armadillidium species differs at certain temperatures as well as certain light levels. However, it's been found that these conditions interact to affect how pill bugs respond. Typically, Armadillidium don't move very quick, but at low and moderate temperatures they will move considerably faster when presented with light. Certain Armadillidium species are also known to increase their activity when subjected to hot environments, instead of limiting their action as many animals do.

Because of their exoskeletons, Armadillidium are subject to high rates of transpiration and are therefore especially susceptible to drying out. Their pseudotracheae are also a major source of water loss, around 42% of their total, as the organ can't be closed off. Along with protection from predators, volvation also decreases the amount of water lost through their exoskeleton via transpiration.

Armadillidium are organisms that can aggregate in groups. They have been known to aggregate around the same species more than compared to clay models of them. This response – controlled by touch and potentially influenced by pheromones – can be useful for decreasing water lost by transpiration.

Some Armadillidium have been found to have a circadian rhythm that determines their nocturnality but can also be influenced by moisture levels and light.

=== Stressful conditions ===
When subjected to strenuous conditions, such as dehydration, some females of Armadillidium species react by spending their energy on reproduction rather than growth.

=== Growth ===
Armadillidium mature at around 1 year of age, and are known to usually live around 2–3 years, with some species, such as Armadillidium vulgare, living up to 5 years.

Although their rigid exoskeleton provides protection, it also limits how large Armadillidium can grow. Because of this, they must shed their exoskeleton to get bigger. However, right after moulting, the pill bug is susceptible to many dangers, such as predation, as their cuticle – which comprises their new exoskeleton –is soft and their colouration is closer to white or translucent rather than their regular greys, blacks, and browns.

Over the course of their lives, Armadillidium are able to produce up to three broods per year, with each consisting of up to 200 eggs. These broods are kept in a pouch called the marsupium, whereupon hatching the young stay for anywhere from 1 week to 2 months before emerging from the pouch as juveniles.

== Reproduction ==
Armadillidium use copulation to transfer the males sperm packet to the females eggs which are excreted from the paired ovaries and oviduct. Females have a unique adaptation called the marsupium or ‘brood-pouch’ that carries eggs for 1–2 weeks till they are ready to hatch. The marsupium is formed during the parturial molt by two layers of the pill bug's endoplasm and provides nutrients, calcium, water and oxygen to their young. Embryogenesis occurs within the brood-pouch once the fertilized eggs pass through a string-like tube. Armadillidium hatched larvae are called ‘mancae’, which refer to the first instar before the first molt, when the manca has only 6 pereopods and 6 pairs of legs compared to the 7 of mature individuals. Pill bugs are iteroparous, meaning they produce offspring and reproduce multiple times throughout their lives, they also mate seasonally in the summer months. Armadillidium females can retain sperm in a seminal receptacle to produce multiple broods after mating only once.Armadillidium mate during the intermolt phase: prior to moulting and producing a brood-pouch. Although some species have parthenogenic tendencies, most Armadillidium are not primarily parthenogenic and require contributions from both males and females to produce viable offspring. The females of some Armadillidium species, such as A. perracae, are known to partner with multiple males. The broods a female produces have the capacity to contain offspring that are all one sex or a combination of male and female.

The reproduction of Armadillidium is affected by external as well as internal factors, such as light and temperature. When the levels of light they receive are consistent, female Armadillidium will start reproducing, and when temperatures increase so too does the reproduction rate. Reproduction can also be initiated by low light intensity. Along with light intensity, the duration of light also affects Armadillidium reproduction, and will increase the reproductive period's duration if the lighting suggests a long daytime. The presence of males in some species of Armadillidium can also influence reproduction, affecting the female gonads and causing them to mature at a faster rate than if there were no males around. Armadillidium will also mature faster when subjected to increased temperatures.

Like in many other organisms, reproduction and growth are linked in Armadillidium. The growth rates of reproductive females are significantly less than those of non-reproductive females of similar sizes. In non-reproductive females, the total energy they contribute to growth is equivalent to the energy that reproductive females devote to both reproduction and growth. The fertility of female Armadillidium is also influenced by their size, with larger individuals having greater reproductive output as they have larger brood pouches and are able to carry more offspring. This leads to the positive correlation between reproduction and growth in females, wherein the larger and more weight a female has, the larger her brood will be. Although one-year-old females make up the largest proportion of the breeding population, two-year-old females have larger broods and outproduce them. Location can also affect reproduction, with marked differences in the number of broods produced each year by the same species in different parts of the world. For example, in England, A. vulgare has been recorded as producing 1 brood per year compared to 2 per year in California.

== Parasites and predators ==
An Acanthocephalan species Plagiorhynchus cylindraceus is responsible for parasitizing and altering Armadillidium (primarily A. vulgare) behaviour. The parasite eggs are ingested via coprophagy and eventually develop into larvae which burrow into the pill bug's body cavity via the gut wall. As the parasite develops, it makes the pill bugs avoid their usual sheltered areas, seek out lighter coloured substrates (making their dark colouration stand out), as well as stay in drier areas as opposed to their usual moist habitats. All of these behavioural changes combine to increase the pill bug's chances of being preyed upon by the parasitic worm's primary host: the starling.

It has been suggested in a paper by Oscar H. Paris that Armadillidium vulgare does not suffer any major pressures from predation by spiders, lizards, and salamanders. The tegumental glands are suggested to be an evolved trait for terrestrial isopods as a defense mechanism as they do not occur is aquatic isopods.

== Human interactions ==
Armadillidium vulgare is considered a soil bioindicator because it is globally distributed. They are sensitive to environmental changes and the effects of global warming. When soil pH, temperature, vegetation and water availability are not optimal, it can decrease A. vulgare distribution and body size. Soil pH is easily altered by pesticides and non-organic fertilizers which affects the amount of calcium which is needed to build up the pill bugs' chitinous exoskeleton.

In greenhouses and agriculture, Armadillidium is considered a pest, but they can also be helpful as a detritovores because they eat dead leaves, animals and leafmold.

Armadillidium is also part of the Spain pet trade, being sold in pet stores and online shops. 57% of the species traded are native to Spain, but many are also introduced which can lead to invasive species. Common species that are traded include Armadillidium album, Armadillidium arcangelii and Armadillidium assimile.

== Evolution ==
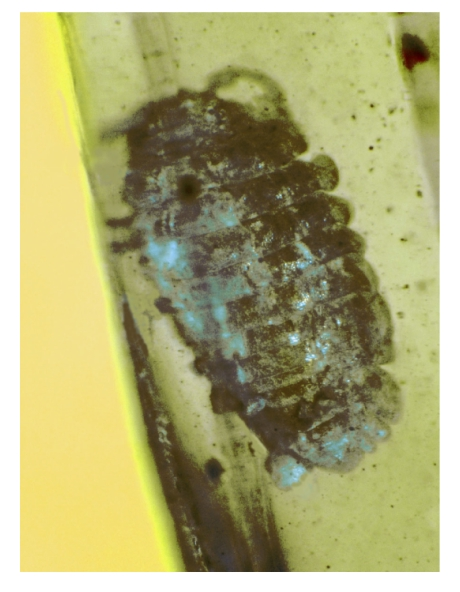
Fossilized isopod in amber from the early cretaceous.

Terrestrial isopods are believed to have evolved to live on land after first emerging from the ocean to the shore and littoral zone, and it is hypothesized that Armadillidium ancestors were marine. There is evidence of Oniscoid – a suborder that includes Armadillidium as well as both terrestrial and aquatic isopods – isopods that originate sometime around the Eocene and Oligocene epochs. There was also a fossil discovered of an Oligocene member of Armadillidium in 1985 in Hungary that was described in a paper by Dalens and Bouthier. Oniscidean isopods are the only Pancrustaceans, with the exception of hexapods, to have adapted to terrestrial life. One of the earliest authenticated fossils of the suborder Oniscidea was found in the early cretaceous. Isopod fossils are notably hard to find because of the low preservation potential of the chitinous skeleton that arthropods possess; the best preserved isopod fossils are typically preserved in amber since others are usually destroyed or deformed in the processes after death and fossilization. Armadillidium traces and fossils have been found as early as the Miocene and Pleistocene, but the records and dating are uncertain. A couple of fossils were found of species Porcellio scaber. Armadillidium vulgare sub-fossils were found in Britain but not many fossils have been found. Multiple representatives of families are found in the Eocene epoch it has been hypothesized that the genus evolved sometime prior to then.

== Species ==
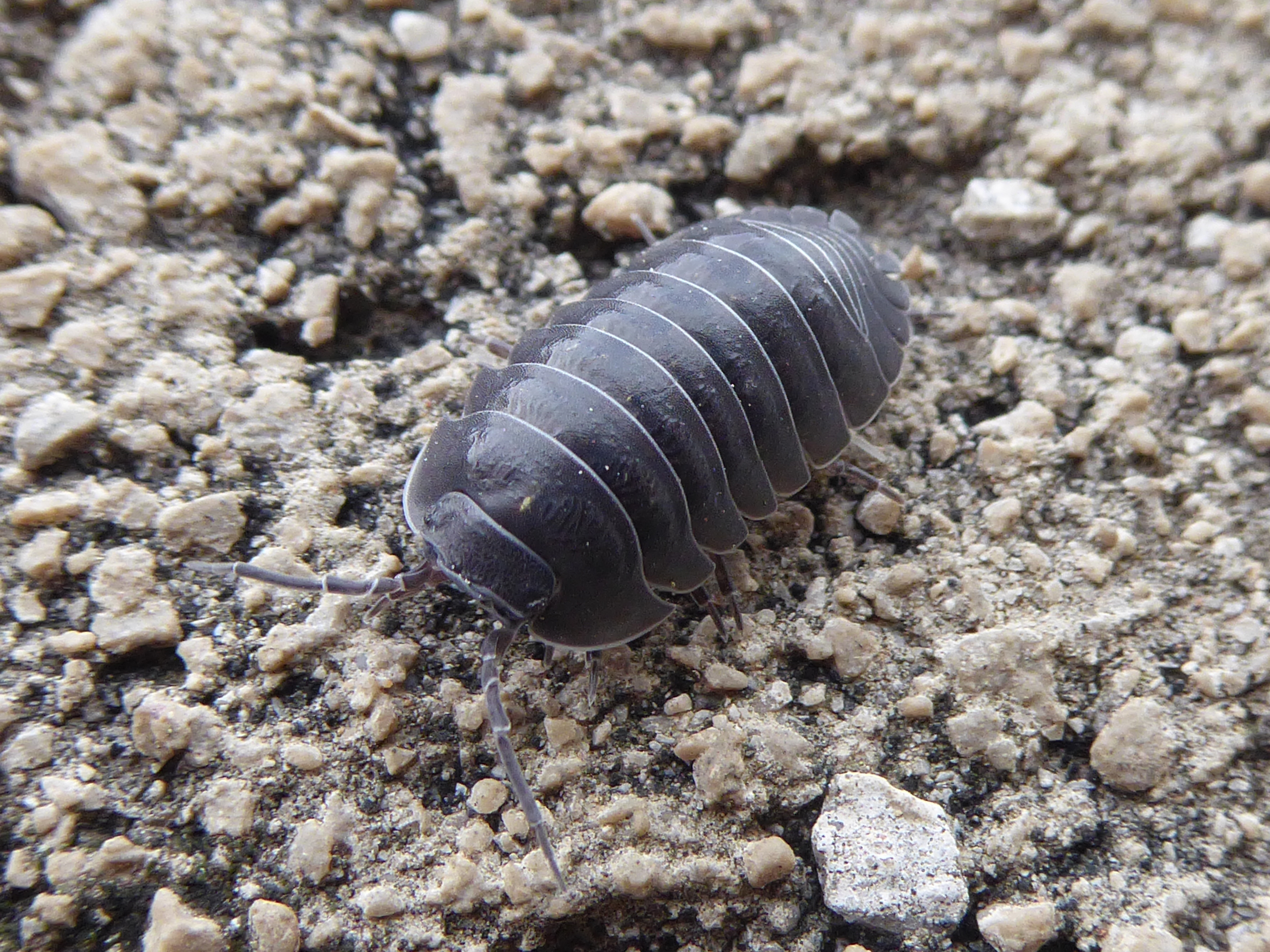
Armadillidium depressum

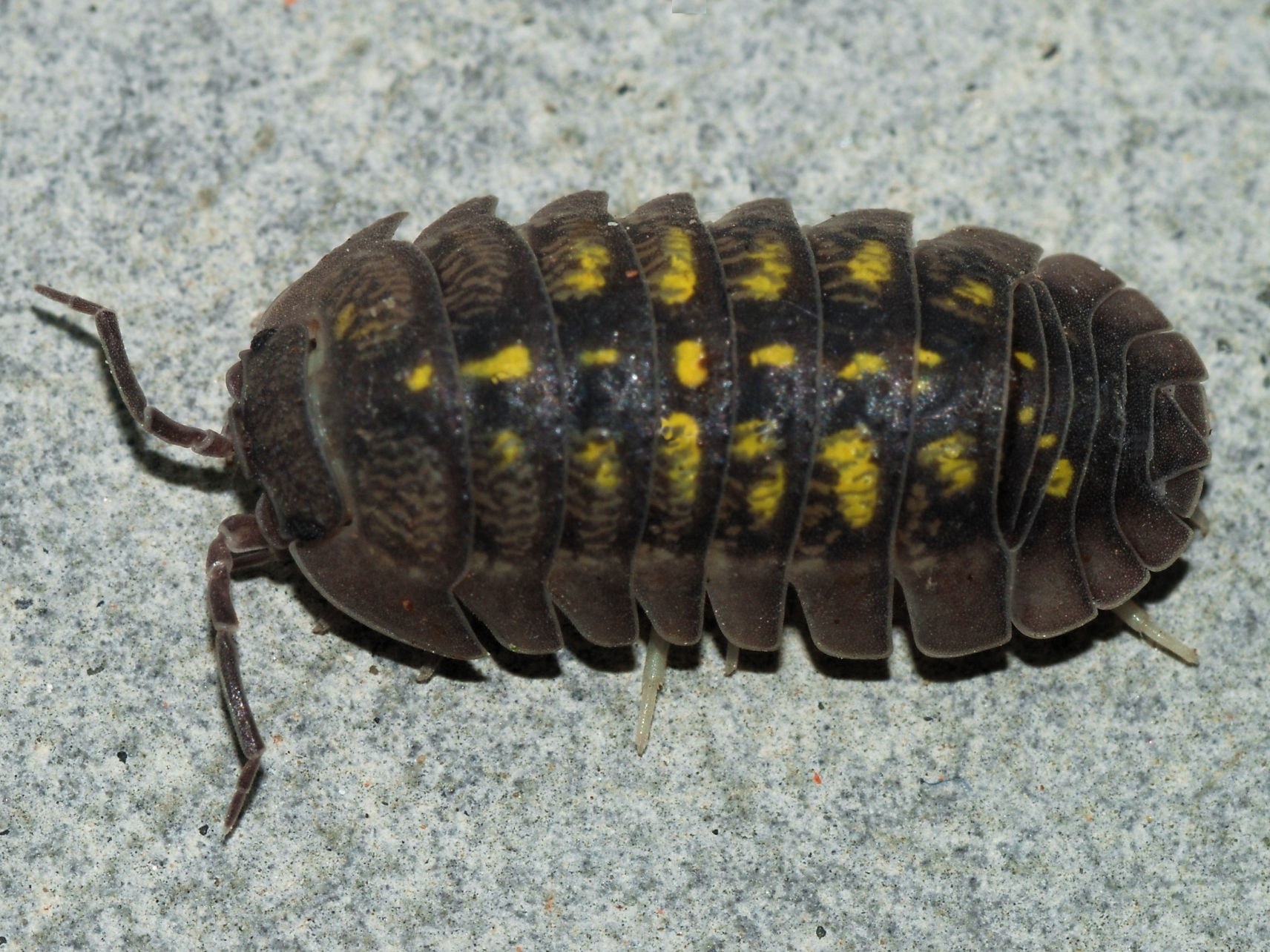
Armadillidium granulatum

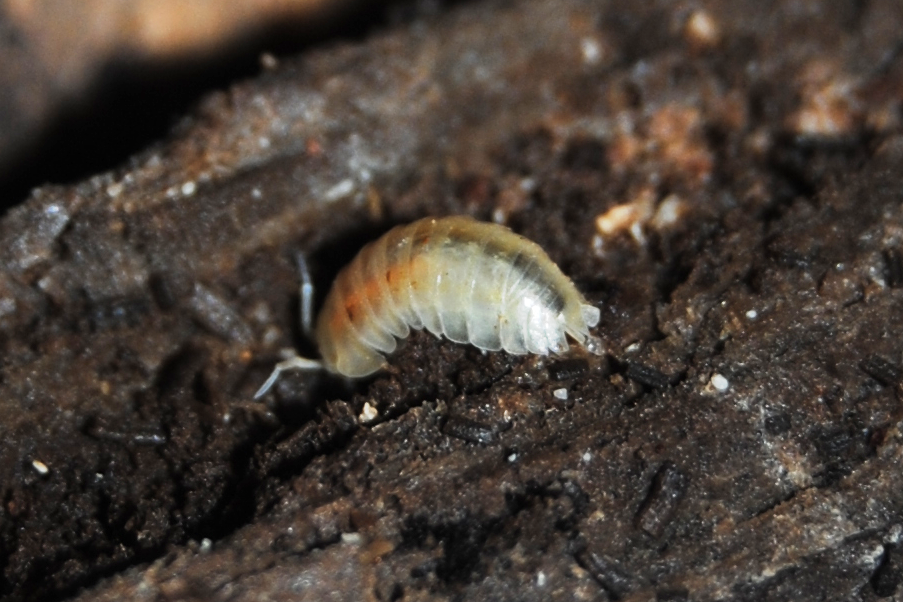
Armadillidium lagrecai

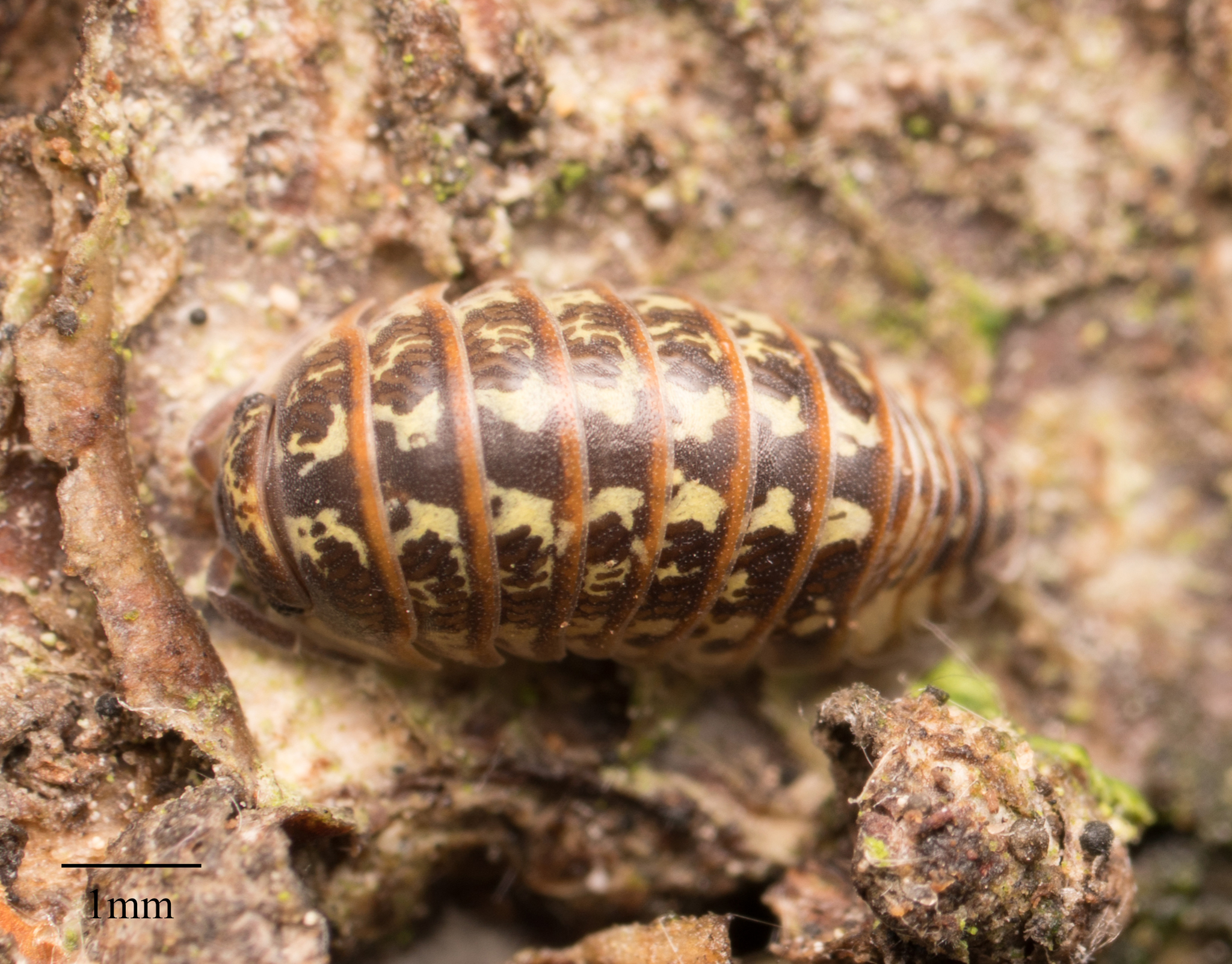
Armadillidium pictum

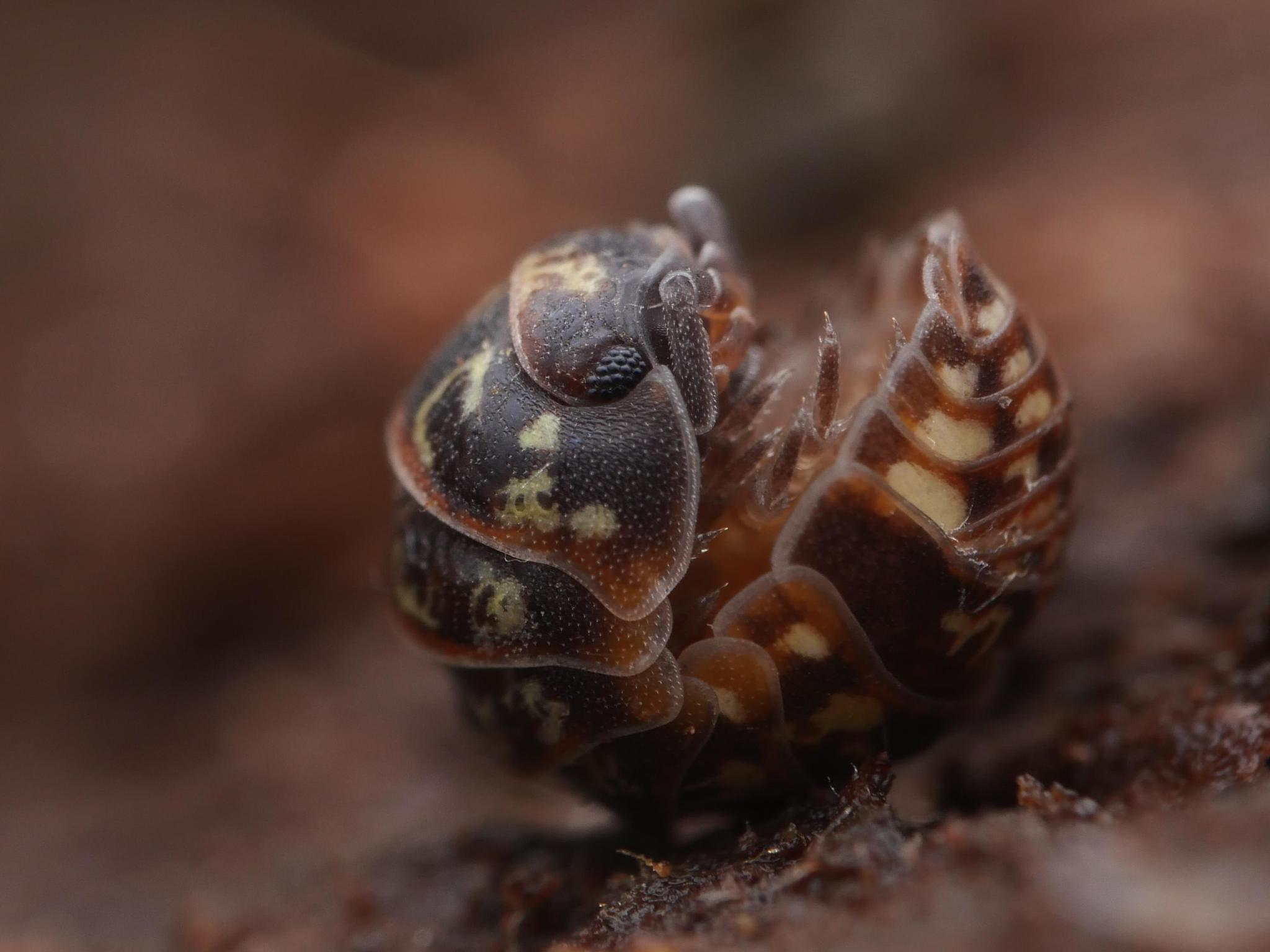
Armadillidium pulchellum

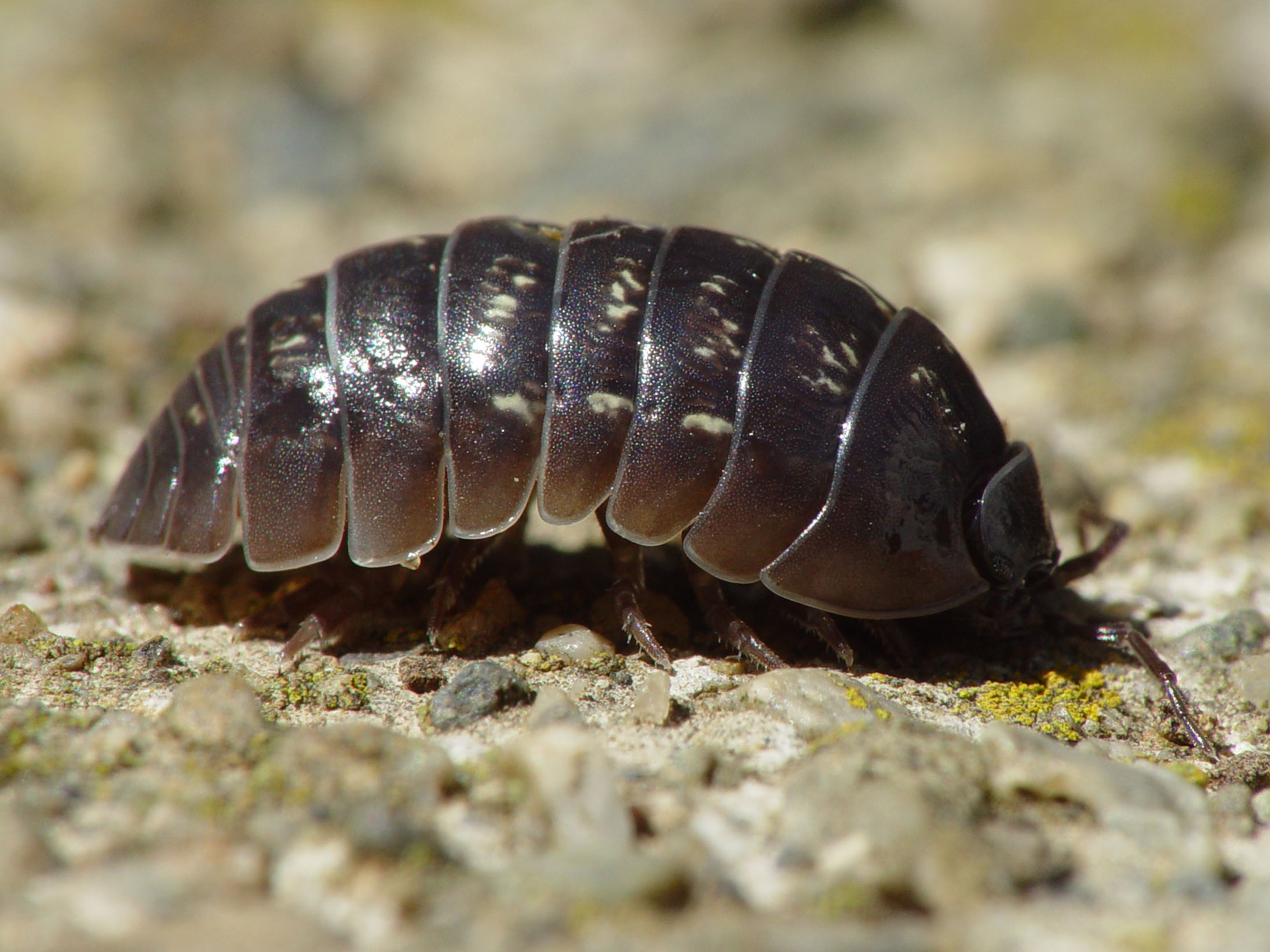
Armadillidium vulgare

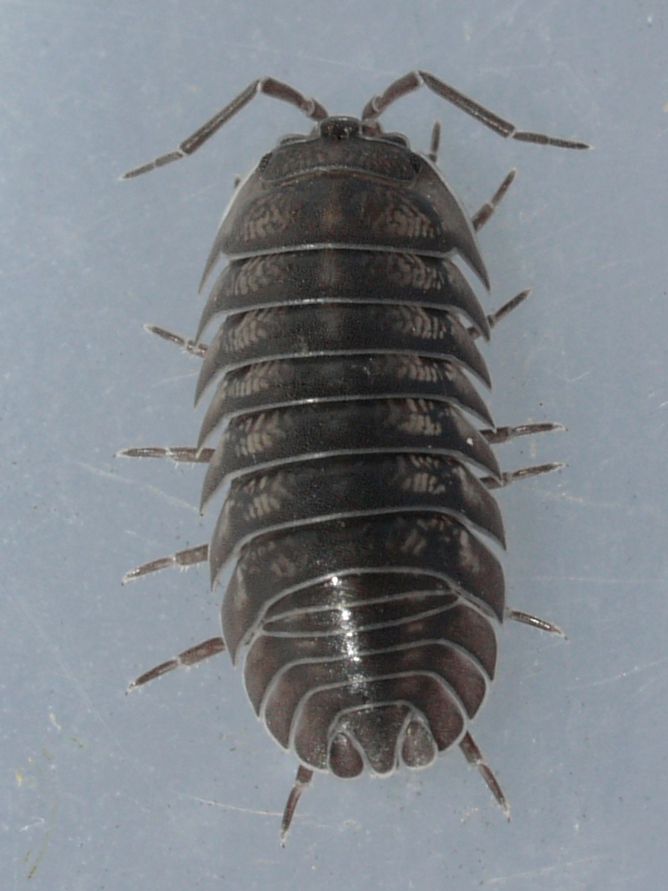
Armadillidium nasatum

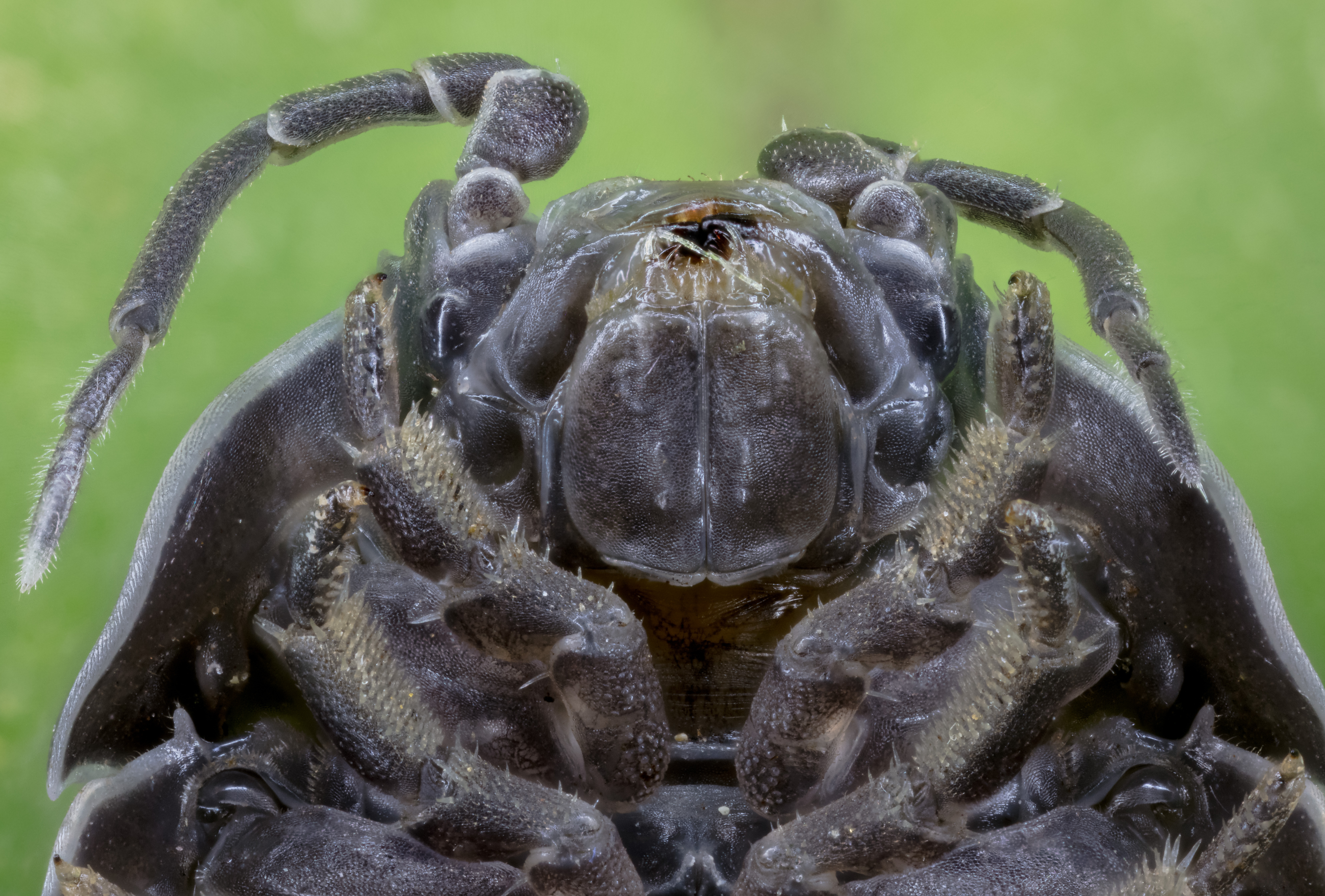
Macro shot of an Armadillidium opacum

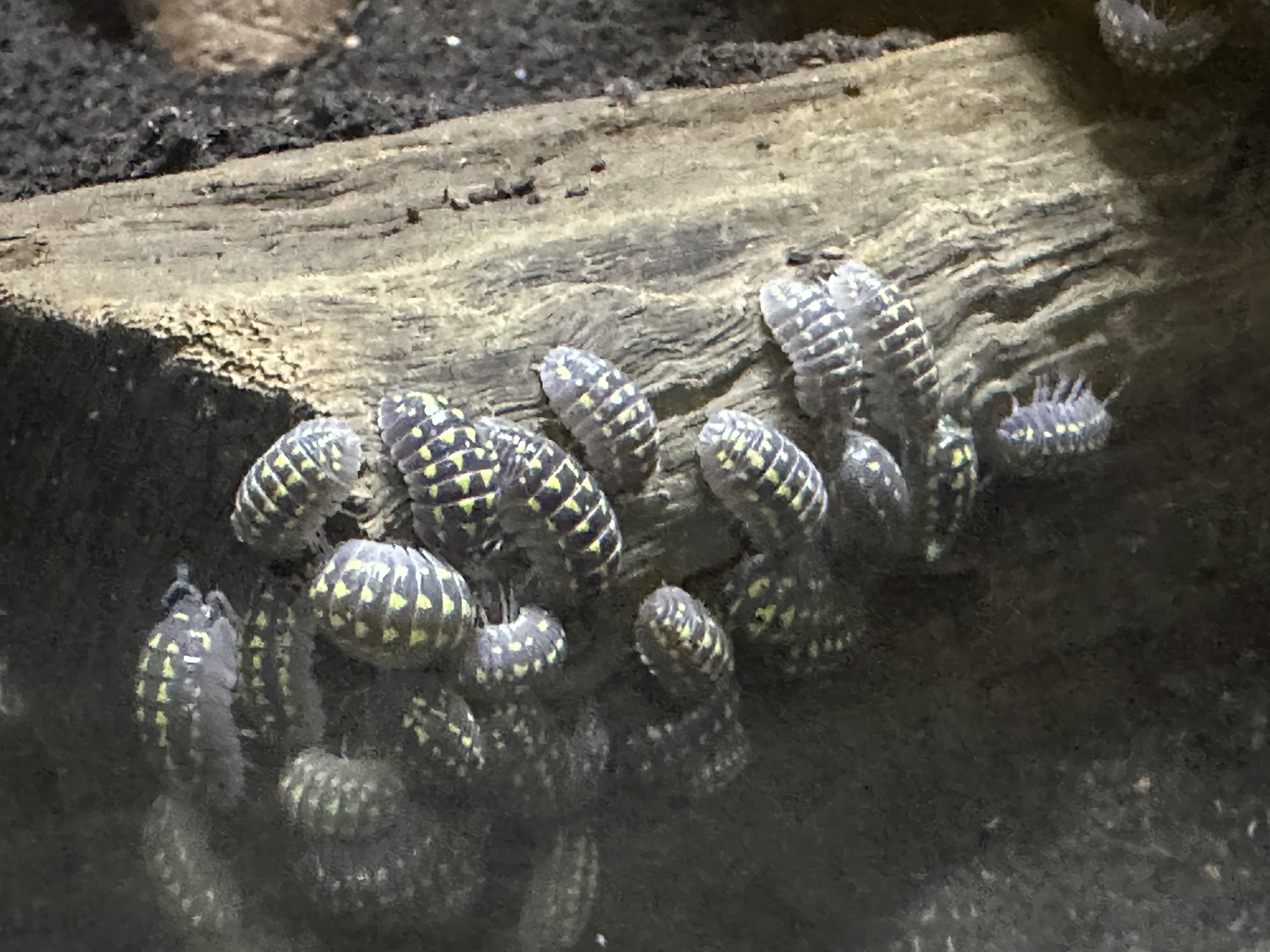
Armadillidium gestroi

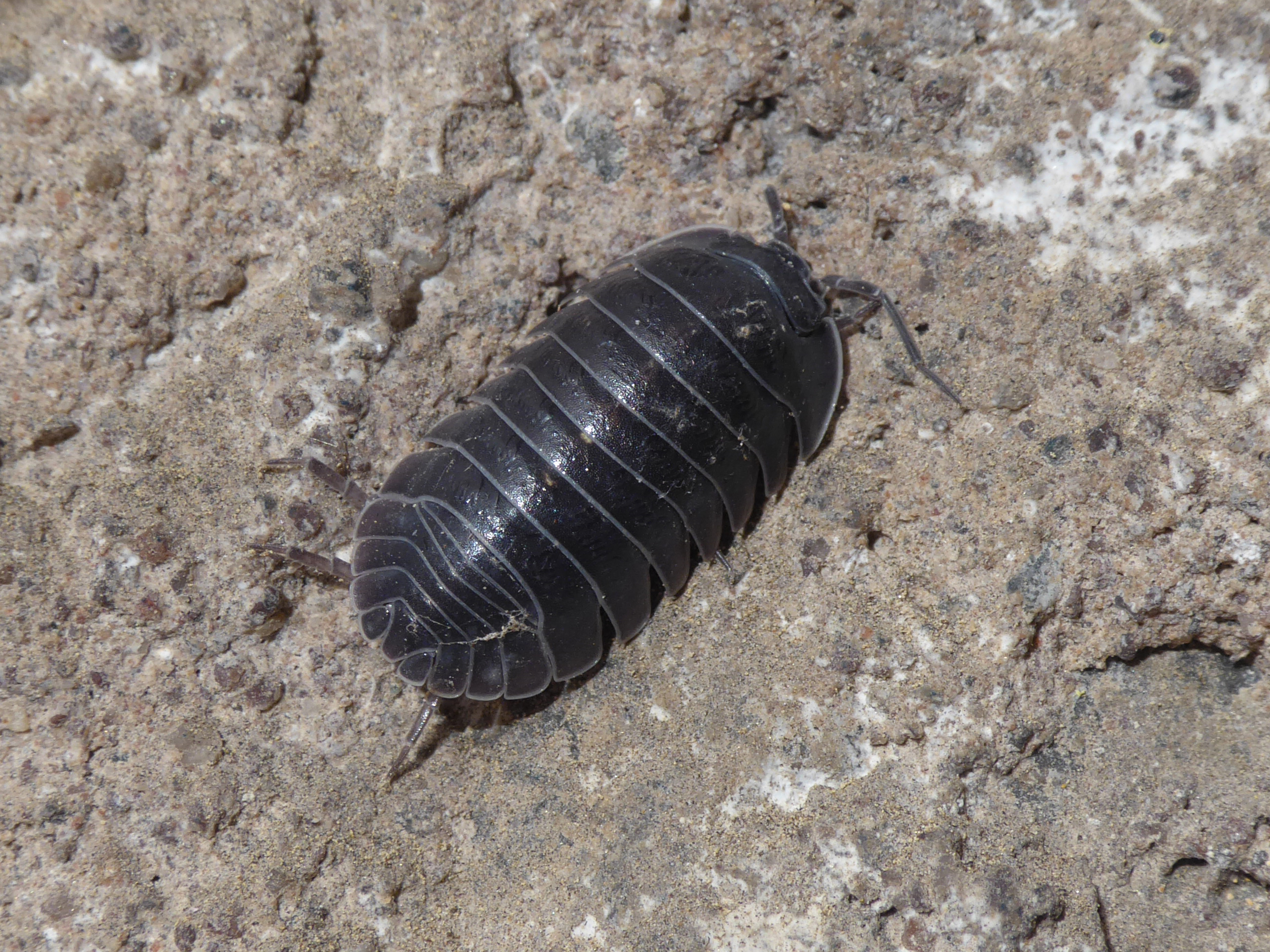
Armadillidium pallasii

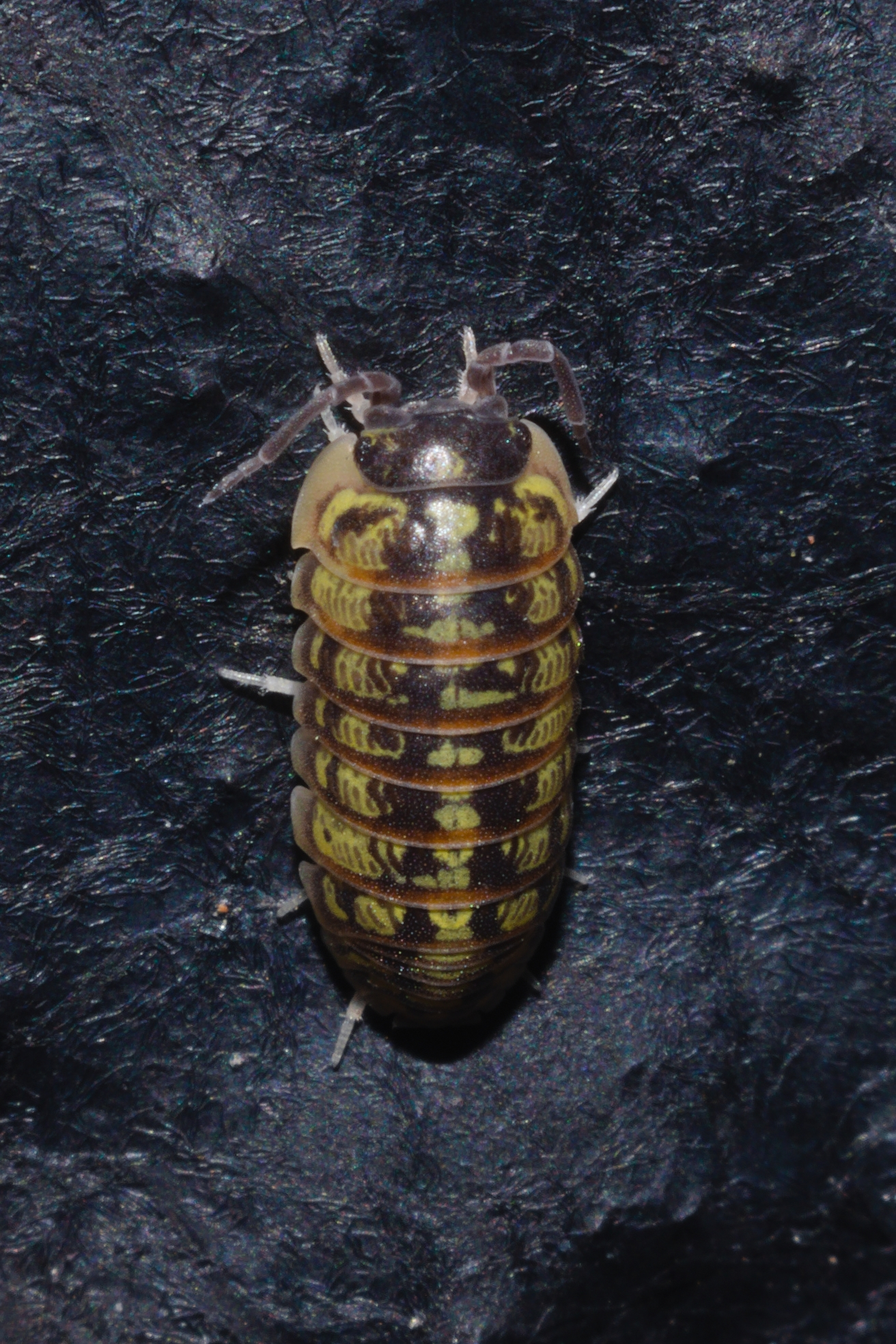
Armadillidium versicolor

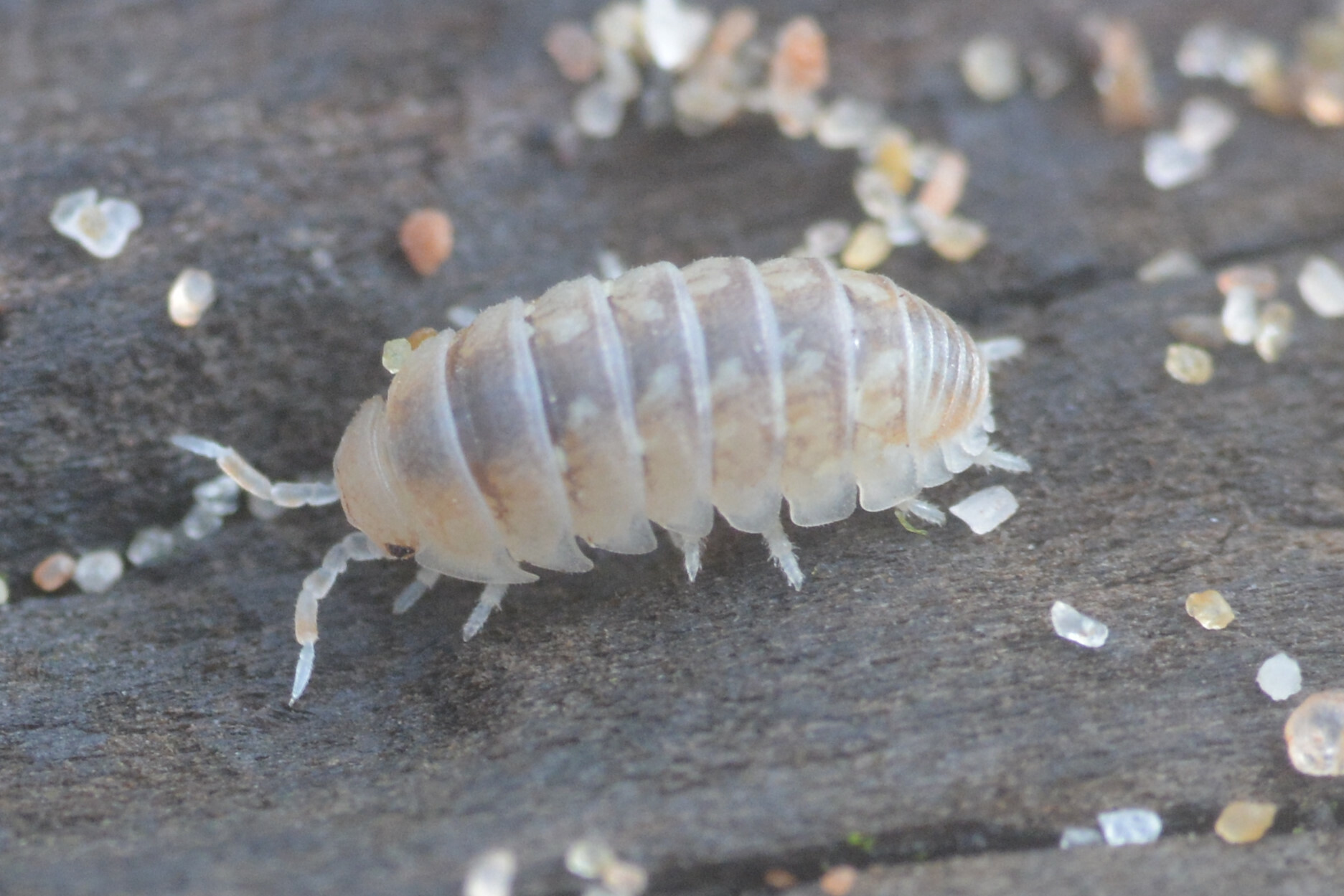
Armadillidium album

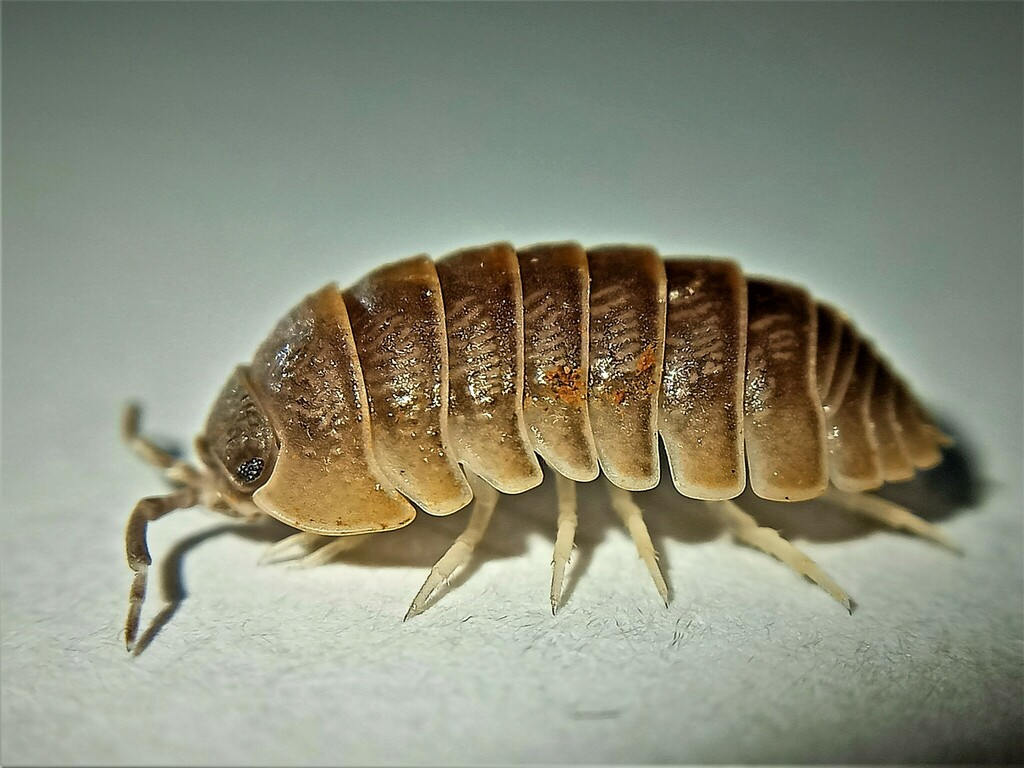
Armadillidium atticum

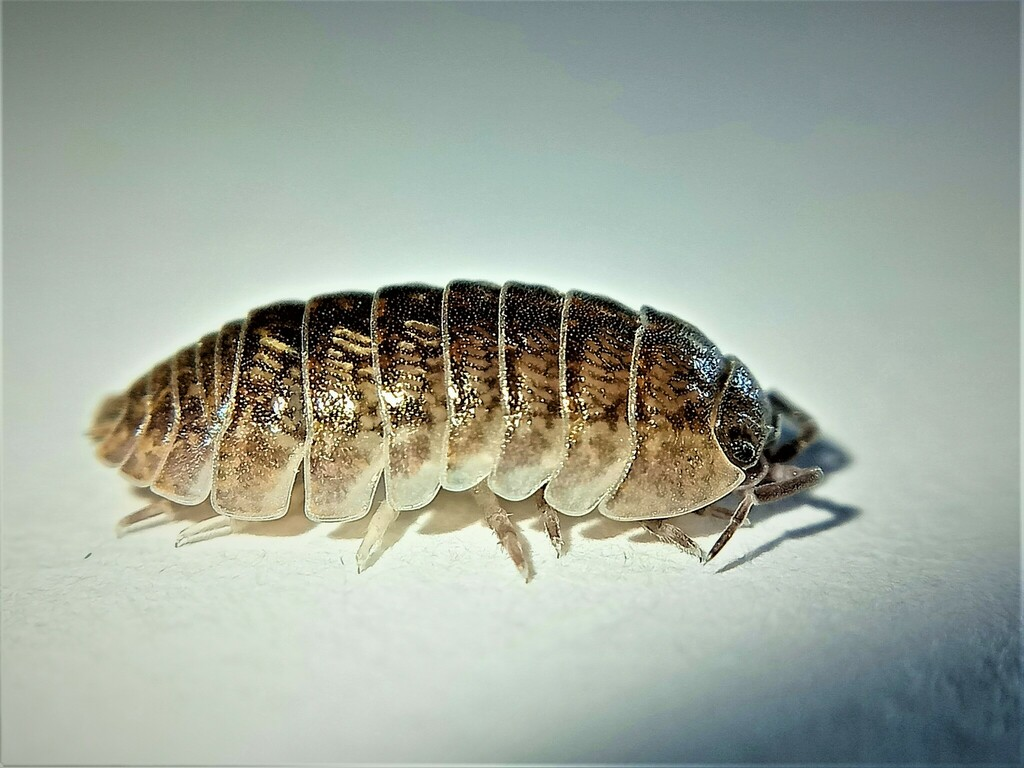
Armadillidium marmoratum

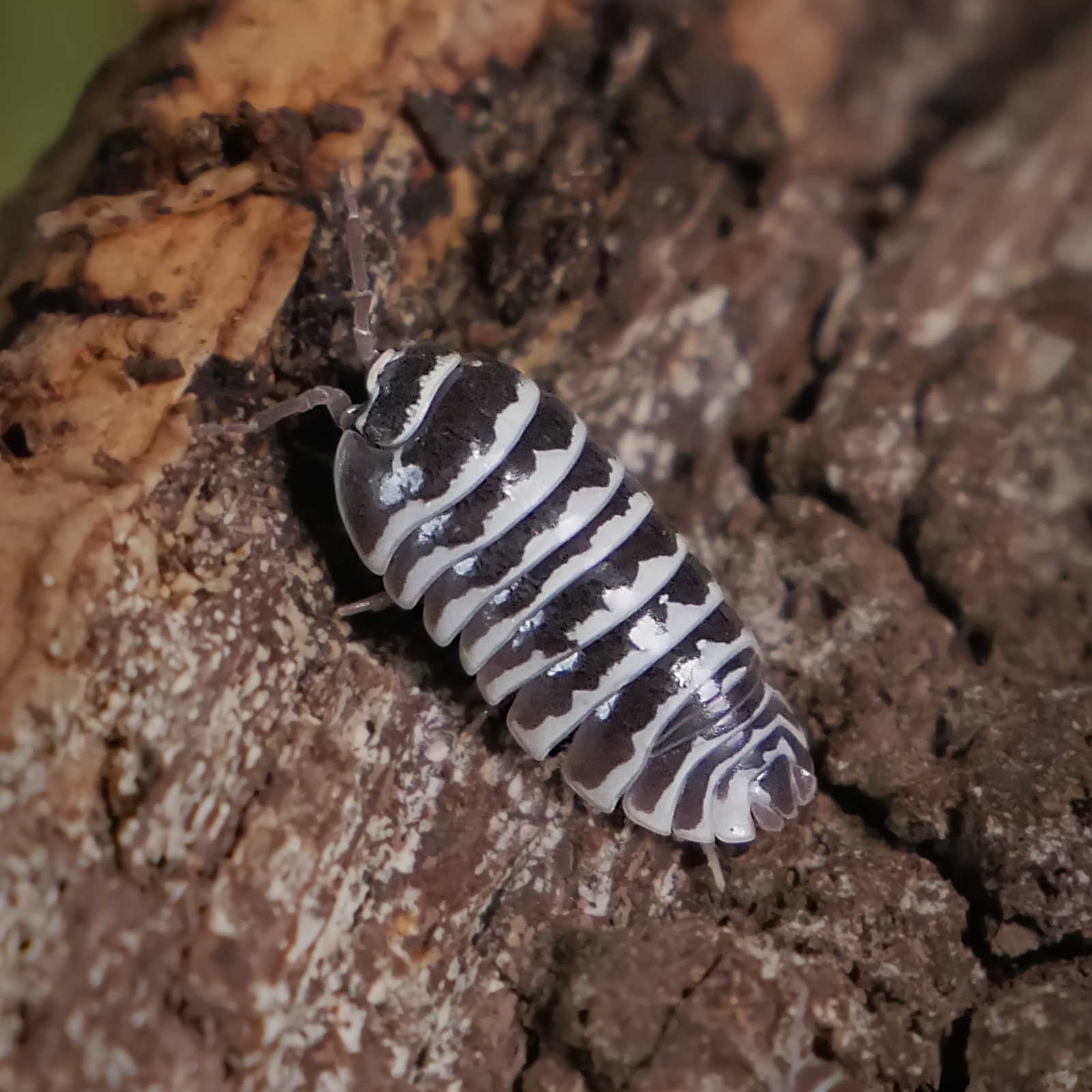
Armadillidium maculatum

There are 189 recognised species in the genus Armadillidium:

- Armadillidium absoloni Strouhal, 1939
- Armadillidium aegaeum Strouhal, 1929
- Armadillidium aelleni Caruso & Ferrara, 1982
- Armadillidium alassiense Verhoeff, 1910
- Armadillidium albigauni Arcangeli, 1935
- Armadillidium albomarginatum Verhoeff, 1901
- Armadillidium album Dollfus, 1887
- Armadillidium ameglioi Arcangeli, 1914
- Armadillidium amicorum Rodriguez & Vicente, 1993
- Armadillidium anconanum Verhoeff, 1928
- Armadillidium angulatum Koelbel, 1891
- Armadillidium apenninigenum Verhoeff, 1936
- Armadillidium apenninorum Verhoeff, 1928
- Armadillidium apfelbecki Dollfus, 1895
- Armadillidium apuanum Taiti & Ferrara, 1995
- Armadillidium arcadicum Verhoeff, 1902
- Armadillidium arcangelii Strouhal, 1929
- Armadillidium argentarium Verhoeff, 1931
- Armadillidium argolicum Verhoeff, 1907
- Armadillidium artense Strouhal, 1956
- Armadillidium assimile Budde-Lund, 1885
- Armadillidium atticum Strouhal, 1929
- Armadillidium azerbaidzhanum Schmalfuss, 1990
- Armadillidium badium Budde-Lund, 1885
- Armadillidium baldense Verhoeff, 1902
- Armadillidium banaticum Verhoeff, 1907
- Armadillidium beieri Strouhal, 1937
- Armadillidium bensei Schmalfuss, 2006
- Armadillidium bicurvatum Verhoeff, 1901
- Armadillidium boalense Cifuentes, Robla & Garcia, 2024
- Armadillidium bosniense Strouhal, 1939
- Armadillidium boukorninense Hamaied, Charfi-Cheikhrouha & Lombardo, 2018
- Armadillidium brentanum Verhoeff, 1932
- Armadillidium bulgaricum Frankenberger, 1941
- Armadillidium calabricum Verhoeff, 1908
- Armadillidium canaliferum Verhoeff, 1908
- Armadillidium capreae Verhoeff, 1944
- Armadillidium carniolense Verhoeff, 1901
- Armadillidium carynthiacum Verhoeff, 1939
- Armadillidium cavannai Arcangeli, 1960
- Armadillidium cephalonicum Strouhal, 1929
- Armadillidium chazaliei Dollfus, 1896
- Armadillidium clausi Verhoeff, 1901
- Armadillidium clavigerum Verhoeff, 1928
- Armadillidium corcyraeum Verhoeff, 1901
- Armadillidium cruzi Garcia, 2003
- Armadillidium cythereium Strouhal, 1937
- Armadillidium dalmaticum Strouhal, 1939
- Armadillidium decorum Brandt, 1833
- Armadillidium delattini Verhoeff, 1943
- Armadillidium depressum Brandt in Brandt & Ratzeburg, 1831
- Armadillidium djebalensis Vandel, 1958
- Armadillidium dollfusi Verhoeff, 1902
- Armadillidium elysii Verhoeff, 1936
- Armadillidium epiroticum Strouhal, 1956
- Armadillidium espanyoli Cruz, 1992
- Armadillidium esterelanum Dollfus, 1887
- Armadillidium etruriae Ferrara & Taiti, 1978
- Armadillidium euxinum Verhoeff, 1929
- Armadillidium fallax Brandt, 1833
- Armadillidium ficalbii Arcangeli, 1911
- Armadillidium flavoscutatum Strouhal, 1927
- Armadillidium fossuligerum Verhoeff, 1902
- Armadillidium frontemarginatum Strouhal, 1927
- Armadillidium frontetriangulum Verhoeff, 1901
- Armadillidium furcatum Budde-Lund, 1885
- Armadillidium galiciense Schmölzer, 1955
- Armadillidium germanicum Verhoeff, 1901
- Armadillidium gestroi Tua, 1900
- Armadillidium ghardalamensis Caruso & Hili, 1991
- Armadillidium gionum Schmalfuss, 2012
- Armadillidium granulatum Brandt, 1833
- Armadillidium grimmi Schmalfuss, 2006
- Armadillidium hauseni Schmalfuss, 1985
- Armadillidium herzegowinense Verhoeff, 1907
- Armadillidium hessei Verhoeff, 1930
- Armadillidium hirtum Budde-Lund, 1885
- Armadillidium humectum Strouhal, 1937
- Armadillidium ibericum Cifuentes & Escarabajal Bernabé, 2022
- Armadillidium ichkeuli Hamaied & Charfi-Cheikhrouha, 2017
- Armadillidium insulanum Verhoeff, 1907
- Armadillidium irmengardis Strouhal, 1956
- Armadillidium janinense Verhoeff, 1902
- Armadillidium jaqueti Dollfus in Jaquet, 1898
- Armadillidium jerrentrupi Schmalfuss, 2008
- Armadillidium jonicum Strouhal, 1927
- Armadillidium justi Strouhal, 1937
- Armadillidium kalamatense Verhoeff, 1907
- Armadillidium kalamium Strouhal, 1956
- Armadillidium klaptoczi Verhoeff, 1908
- Armadillidium klugii Brandt, 1833
- Armadillidium kochi Dollfus, 1887
- Armadillidium kossuthi Arcangeli, 1929
- Armadillidium kuehnelti Schmalfuss, 2006
- Armadillidium laconicum Strouhal, 1938
- Armadillidium lagrecai Vandel, 1969
- Armadillidium laminigerum Verhoeff, 1907
- Armadillidium lanzai Taiti & Ferrara, 1996
- Armadillidium littorale Taiti & Ferrara, 1996
- Armadillidium lobocurvum Verhoeff, 1902
- Armadillidium lymberakisi Schmalfuss, Paragamian & Sfenthourakis, 2004
- Armadillidium maccagnoi Arcangeli, 1960
- Armadillidium maculatum (Risso, 1816)
- Armadillidium maniatum Schmalfuss, 2006
- Armadillidium mareoticum Budde-Lund, 1885
- Armadillidium marinense Verhoeff, 1902
- Armadillidium marinensium Verhoeff, 1928
- Armadillidium marmoratum Strouhal, 1929
- Armadillidium marmorivagum Verhoeff, 1934
- Armadillidium messenicum Verhoeff, 1902
- Armadillidium meteorense Schmalfuss, 2012
- Armadillidium mohamedanicum Verhoeff, 1929
- Armadillidium nahumi Garcia, 2020
- Armadillidium narentanum Verhoeff, 1907
- Armadillidium nasatum Budde-Lund, 1885
- Armadillidium nigrum Arcangeli, 1956
- Armadillidium obenbergi Frankenberger, 1941
- Armadillidium odhneri Verhoeff, 1930
- Armadillidium oglasae Ferrara & Taiti, 1978
- Armadillidium opacum (C. Koch, 1841)
- Armadillidium ormeanum Verhoeff, 1931
- Armadillidium paeninsulae Ferrara & Taiti, 1978
- Armadillidium pallasii Brandt, 1833
- Armadillidium pallidum Verhoeff, 1907
- Armadillidium pangaionum Schmalfuss, 2008
- Armadillidium panningi Strouhal, 1937
- Armadillidium pardoi Vandel, 1956
- Armadillidium pelionense Strouhal, 1928
- Armadillidium peloponnesiacum Verhoeff, 1901
- Armadillidium peraccae Tua, 1900
- Armadillidium petralonense Schmalfuss, 2008
- Armadillidium phalacronum Schmalfuss, 2008
- Armadillidium pictum Brandt, 1833
- Armadillidium pieperi Schmalfuss, 2008
- Armadillidium pilosellum Dollfus, 1896
- Armadillidium ponalense Verhoeff, 1934
- Armadillidium portofinense Verhoeff, 1908
- Armadillidium pretusi Cruz, 1992
- Armadillidium pseudassimile Taiti & Ferrara, 1980
- Armadillidium pseudovulgare Verhoeff, 1902
- Armadillidium pulchellum (Zenker in Panzer, 1799)
- Armadillidium quinquepustulatum Budde-Lund, 1885
- Armadillidium rhodopinum Verhoeff, 1936
- Armadillidium rojanum Verhoeff, 1936
- Armadillidium rosai Arcangeli, 1913
- Armadillidium ruffoi Arcangeli, 1940
- Armadillidium rupium Verhoeff, 1928
- Armadillidium sanctum Dollfus, 1892
- Armadillidium savonense Verhoeff, 1931
- Armadillidium saxivagum Verhoeff, 1901
- Armadillidium scaberrimum Stein, 1859
- Armadillidium scabrum Dollfus, 1892
- Armadillidium schmalfussi Caruso & Lombardo, 1982
- Armadillidium serrai Cruz & Dalens, 1990
- Armadillidium serratum Budde-Lund, 1885
- Armadillidium sfenthourakisi Schmalfuss, 2008
- Armadillidium siculorum Verhoeff, 1908
- Armadillidium silvestrii Verhoeff, 1931
- Armadillidium simile Strouhal, 1937
- Armadillidium simoni Dollfus, 1887
- Armadillidium sordidum Dollfus, 1887
- Armadillidium stagnoense Verhoeff, 1902
- Armadillidium steindachneri Strouhal, 1927
- Armadillidium stolikanum Verhoeff, 1907
- Armadillidium storkani Frankenberger, 1941
- Armadillidium strinatii Vandel, 1961
- Armadillidium stymphalicum Schmalfuss, 2006
- Armadillidium sulcatum H. Milne Edwards, 1840
- Armadillidium tabacarui Gruia, Iavorschi & Sarbu, 1994
- Armadillidium teramense Verhoeff, 1933
- Armadillidium tigris Budde-Lund, 1885
- Armadillidium tirolense Verhoeff, 1901
- Armadillidium torchiai Taiti & Ferrara, 1996
- Armadillidium traiani Demianowicz, 1932
- Armadillidium tripolitzense Verhoeff, 1902
- Armadillidium tuberculatum Schmalfuss, 2008
- Armadillidium tunetanum Verhoeff, 1907
- Armadillidium tunisiense Hamaïed & Charfi-Cheikhrouha, 2007
- Armadillidium tyrrhenum Taiti & Ferrara, 1980
- Armadillidium vallombrosae Verhoeff, 1907
- Armadillidium valonae Arcangeli, 1952
- Armadillidium verhoeffi Rogenhofer, 1915
- Armadillidium versicolor Stein, 1859
- Armadillidium versluysi Strouhal, 1937
- Armadillidium virgo Caruso & Bouchon, 2011
- Armadillidium vulgare (Latreille, 1804)
- Armadillidium werneri Strouhal, 1927
- Armadillidium xerovunense Strouhal, 1956
- Armadillidium zangherii Arcangeli, 1924
- Armadillidium zenckeri Brandt, 1833

== See also ==
- Johann Friedrich von Brandt
- Karl Wilhelm Verhoeff
