= Armadillidium phalacronum =

Scientific classification
- Kingdom: Animalia
- Phylum: Arthropoda
- Class: Malacostraca
- Order: Isopoda
- Suborder: Oniscidea
- Family: Armadillidiidae
- Genus: Armadillidium
- Species: A. phalacronum

Binomial name
- Armadillidium phalacronum Schmalfuss, 2008
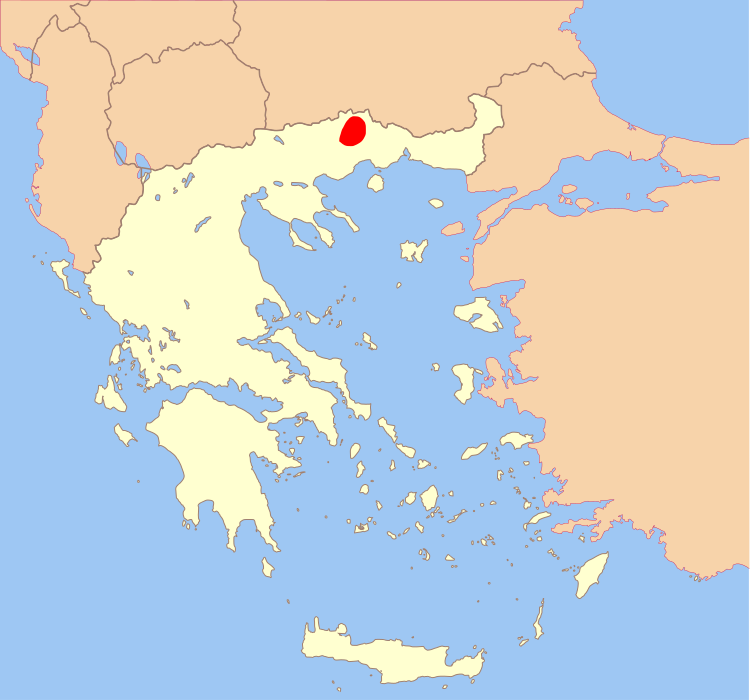
- Distribution of Armadillidium phalacronum (in red)

Species of crustacean

Armadillidium phalacronum is a European species of woodlouse endemic to Greece. It is a relatively small-sized species that probably belongs to the so-called "Armadillidium insulanum complex".

== Taxonomy ==
Armadilliidum phalacronum was described as a distinct species of Armadillidium in 2008, based on specimens collected as far back as 1987. Additionally, the species is also thought to belong to the "Armadillidium insulanum complex", a group of closely related, small-sized pill bugs that occur in various Aegean Islands and the nearby Greek and Turkish coasts. Specifically, within this group, Armadillidium phalacronum is probably most closely related to Armadillidium insulanum sensu lato, from which it can be separated by the curvature of the upper margin of the frontal shield (straight in A. phalacronum vs rounded in A. insulanum), the shape of the antennae lobes (rounded in A. phalacronum vs trapezoidal in A. insulanum) and the length of the posterior lobe of the exopodite of the first pleopod of the male (longer in A. phalacronum).

== Description ==
Armadillidium phalacronum is a small-sized species, reaching maximum dimensions of about 12.5 × 5.5 mm. Its tergites are almost completely smooth. The coloration of the body is brownish gray, sometimes decorated with light spots at the bases of the epimera. The frontal shield surpasses the anterior edge of the head, has a nearly straight upper margin and obtuse-shaped lateral angles. The head itself has a distinct groove in the middle, immediately behind the frontal shield. The secondary antennae have semicircular lobes and the second article of the flagellum is slightly longer than the first. The hind margins of the first pair of epimera are obtuse-angled. The telson is wider than long, with straight sides and a rounded tip.

Concerning the sexual characters of the male, the first pereiopod bears a faintly developed brush of short spines on the carpus and the seventh pereiopod has a ventrally slightly concave ischium, decorated with a hair field at its apical part. The posterior lobe of the exopodite of the first pleopod is triangular and the apex of the endopodite is straight .

== Distribution ==
Armadillidium phalacronum is endemic to the Greek regional unit of Drama in the region of Eastern Macedonia and Thrace. Specifically, specimens have been collected only from Mount Falakro and the southern slopes of the western Rhodope Mountains.

== Ecology ==
Armadillidium phalacronum can be found from 400 m up to 1800 m and in a variety of habitats, ranging from maquis shrublands and mixed forests to alpine meadows.
