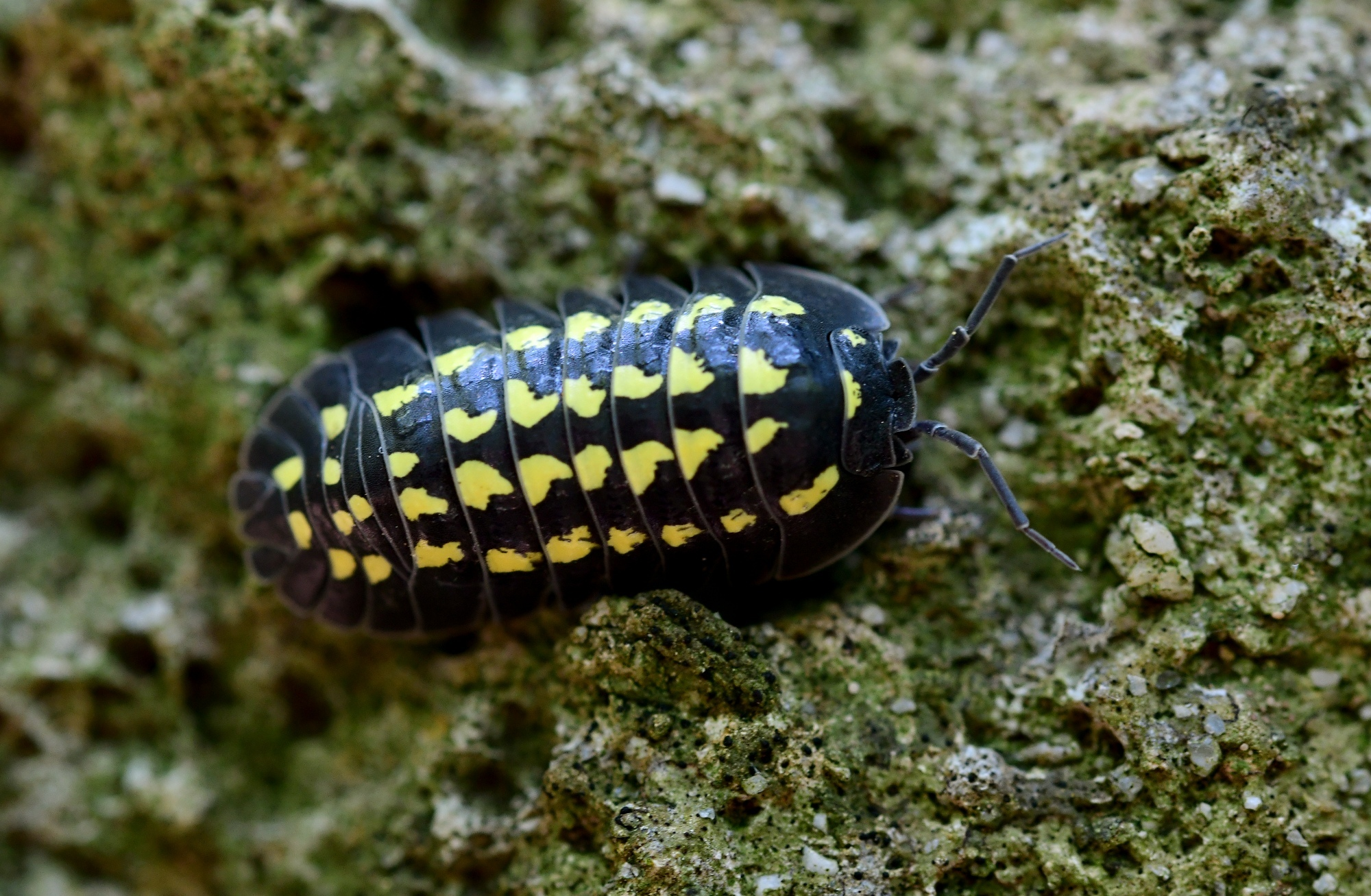
- Armadillidium gestroi specimen photographed in Savona, Italy.

Scientific classification
- Kingdom: Animalia
- Phylum: Arthropoda
- Class: Malacostraca
- Order: Isopoda
- Suborder: Oniscidea
- Family: Armadillidiidae
- Genus: Armadillidium
- Species: A. gestroi

Binomial name
- Armadillidium gestroi Tua, 1900
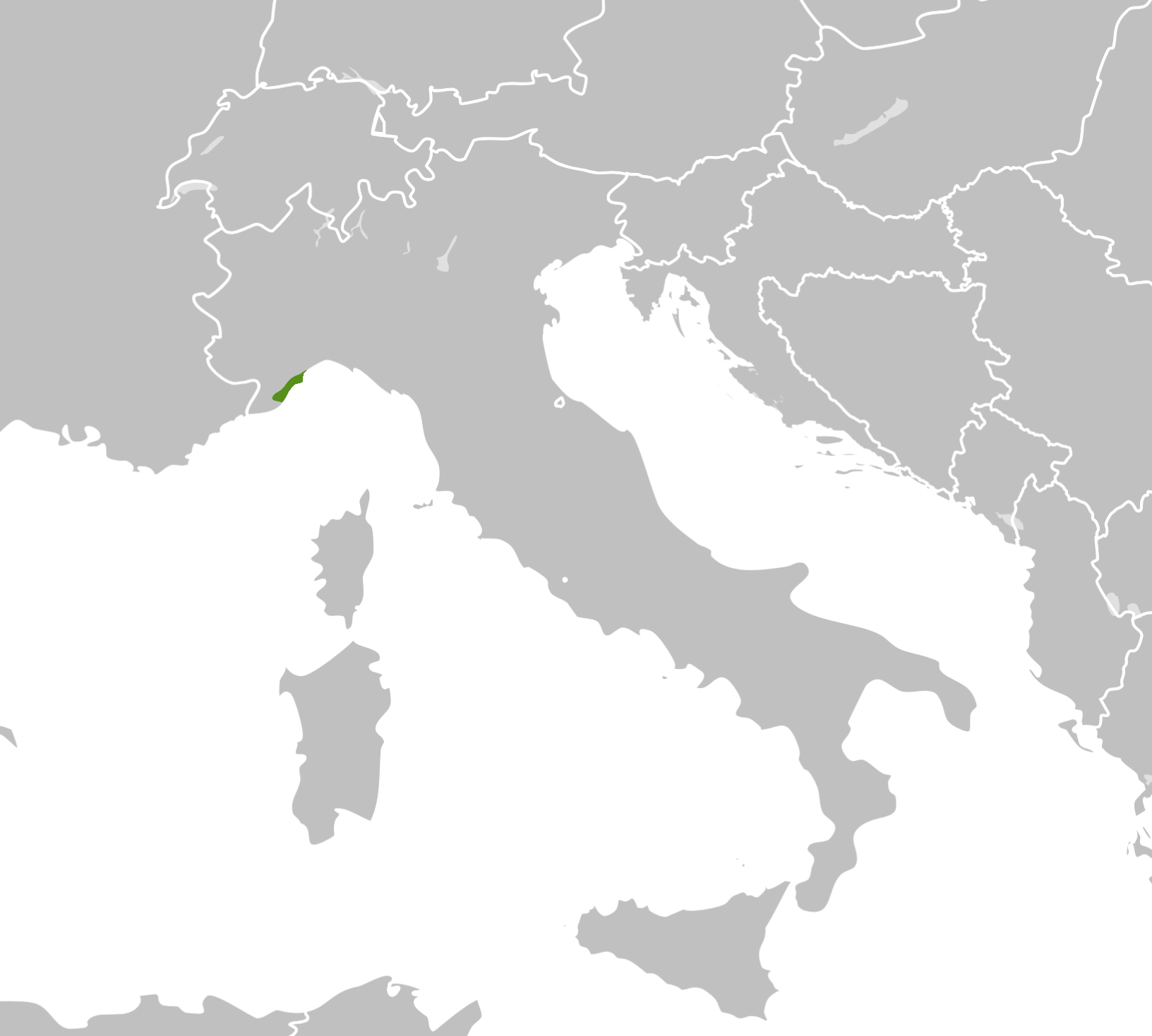
- Range

Synonyms
- Armadillidium quadriseriatum

= Armadillidium gestroi =

Species of woodlouse

Armadillidium gestroi, or Gestroi's pill woodlouse, is a large terrestrial isopod from Italy first officially described by Paolo Tua in 1900. It is sometimes kept in captivity by hobbyists.

== Description ==
This is a relatively large woodlouse, up to 22mm long and 10mm wide, with a rounded cross-section. Its body is dark gray or brown, with rows of yellow spots. Like other Armadillidium species, it can roll into a ball when disturbed, a behavior known as volvation.

== Ecology ==
Armadillidium gestroi lives under stones and decaying plant matter in coastal shrubland, in the strip of land that occurs between the beach and barren mountain slopes. Its distribution seems limited by the combination of Triassic limestone and the humid, stable temperatures due to the influence of the Mediterranean Sea, along with a need for ample vegetation.

A. gestroi displays aposematic coloring, and can produce a strongly unpleasant odor from lateral plate glands. Great tits show signs of discomfort (such as drinking water and bill-cleaning) after eating A. gestroi, but not other kinds of prey, suggesting A. gestroi possesses some form of chemical protection.

== Distribution ==
Armadillidium gestroi is endemic to the Liguria region of northwestern Italy, specifically between Ceriale and Bergeggi.
