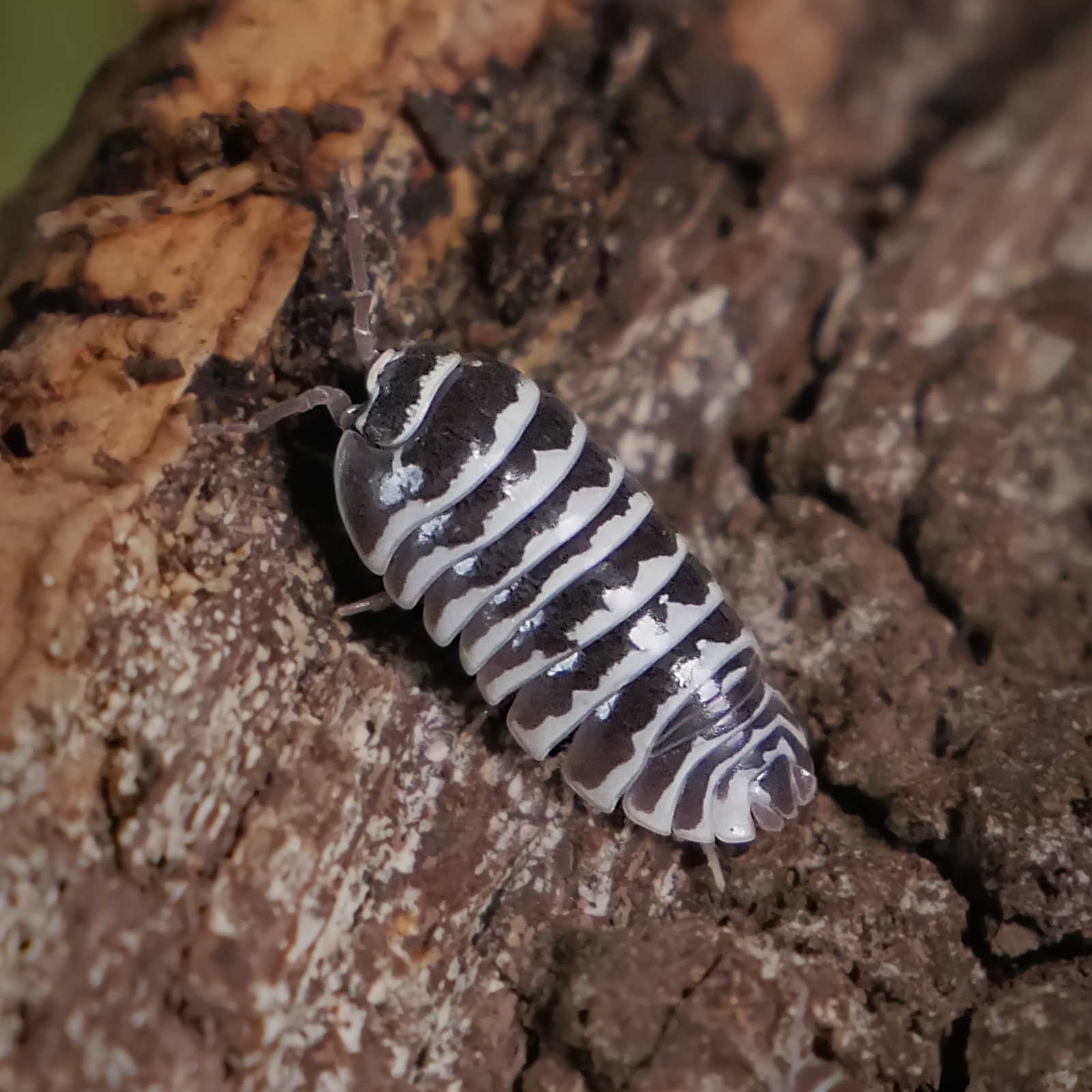

Scientific classification
- Kingdom: Animalia
- Phylum: Arthropoda
- Clade: Pancrustacea
- Class: Malacostraca
- Order: Isopoda
- Suborder: Oniscidea
- Family: Armadillidiidae
- Genus: Armadillidium
- Species: A. maculatum

Binomial name
- Armadillidium maculatum Risso, 1816

= Armadillidium maculatum =

Species of woodlouse

Armadillidium maculatum, also known as the zebra isopod or zebra pillbug, is an Armadillidium species of woodlouse, named for its black and white patterns. It is native to southern France. It is quite popular as pets or vivarium cleaners, due to its ability to break down various waste.

== Description and Life Cycle ==
Armadillidium maculatum is considered average sized for its genus and can reach sizes of up to 18 millimeters or 11/16 inches. Like other members of its family, it can volvate or roll into a ball when disturbed or to conserve moisture.

Its striped appearance is thought to be an example of Batesian mimicry, mimicking the pill millipede Glomeris marginata which secretes noxious chemicals and is native to the same range. Armadillidium maculatum, like all other isopods, have 7 pairs of legs and 7 main body segments (pleon)

Being an arthropod, A. maculatum has an exoskeleton which it must shed (molt) as it grows. Unlike most other arthropods, A. maculatum sheds its exoskeleton in two halves, one at a time (biphasic molting). It is theorized that isopods do this to maintain partial mobility while they are molting and vulnerable.

After mating, a female individual will keep fertilized eggs in an egg-pouch on the underside of her body called the marsupium. After a few weeks, the eggs will emerge from the marsupium as mancae in amounts as many as a hundred babies at a time, though estimates vary depending on age and size of the individual.

The species name "maculatum" in Armadillidium maculatum is derived from the Latin term "maculatus", meaning "spotted", referring to the spotted coloration (or "morph") of the natural specimen as opposed to the striped morph in captivity.

== Ecology ==
Like other woodlice, it is a detritivore which feeds off decaying organic material. It feeds mainly on fallen hardwood leaves and decaying hardwood. Like other members of its genus, it also enjoys fresh plant matter, lichens, tree bark, and algae. Like all other woodlice, it breathes through modified gill-like organs called pleopodal lungs, and requires some moisture to breathe, although it will drown if submerged in liquid for extended periods of time. The gills can be identified as white patches behind the 7th and final pair of legs.

== As pets ==
Armadillidium maculatum has become a very popular pet among isopod hobbyists. Commonly called the zebra isopod due to its bold appearance, it is inexpensive and easy to keep. Armadillidium maculatum has no venomous or harmful bite or sting. Armadillidium maculatum is most often kept as a display isopod in a terrarium. More rarely, Armadillidium maculatum is kept as a cleaner in bioactive setups. Along with other isopods, Armadillidium maculatum can be help to turn otherwise useless organic matter like fallen leaves into essential nutrients. They can also eat leftover reptile food, and eat shed skin of insects and reptiles. Isopod breeders have managed to develop several different morphs of this species including "Yellow Zebra" with yellow stripes instead of white ones; "Spotted Zebras" with white spots instead of stripes; and "High White" where the white stripes are considerably larger and make up a majority of the exoskeleton's coloration. Along with other members of its family and some others, it is not used as a feeder because of their tougher exoskeleton, and their ability to roll into a ball.

== Distribution ==
Armadillidium maculatum is endemic a small region of southeastern France and Monaco. It has a far greater spread as pets and vivarium cleaners. Like other woodlice, it can be found underneath stones, leaf litter, rotting logs, and anywhere that could retain moisture to prevent desiccation, as they need moisture to breathe.
