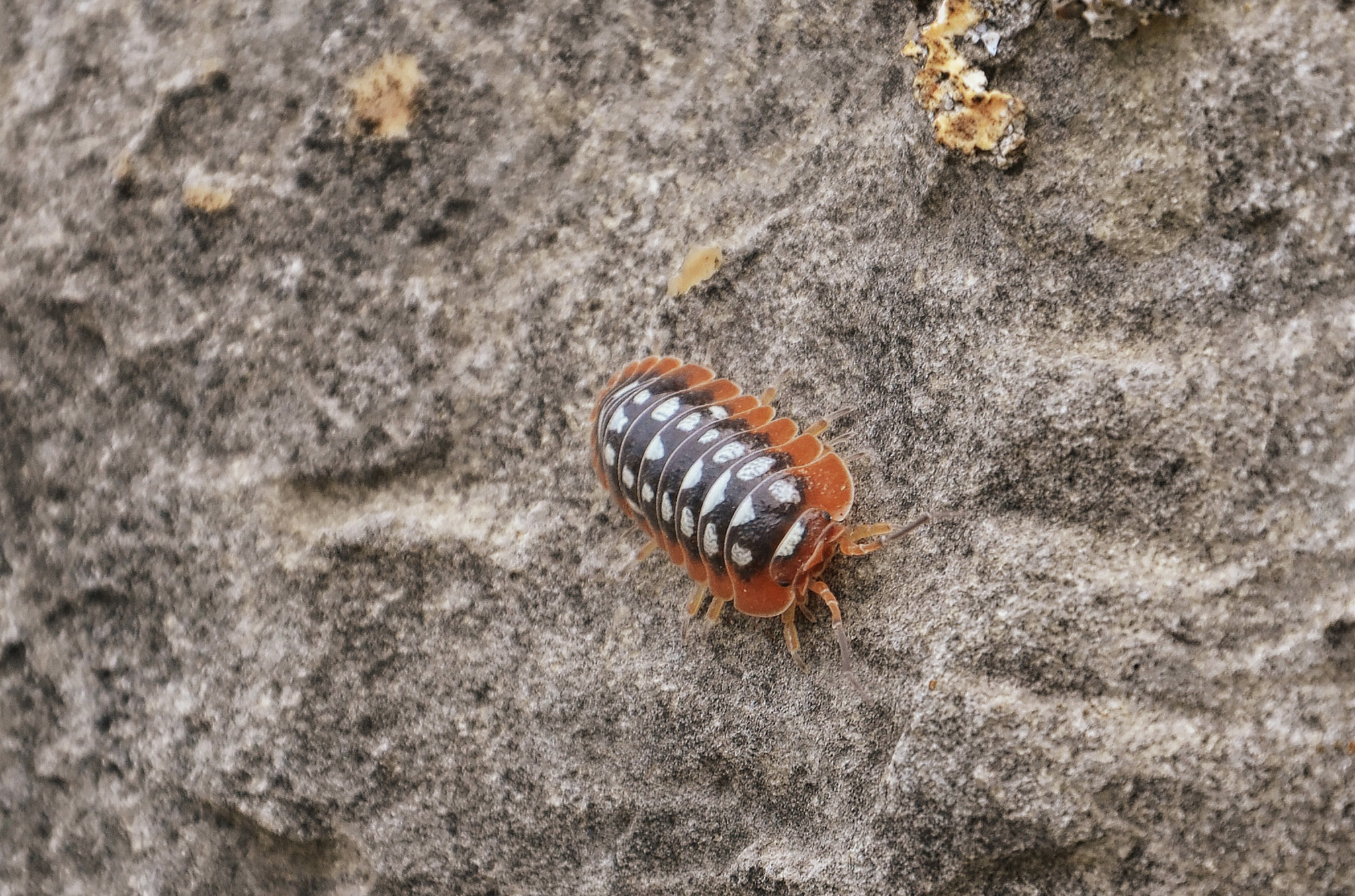

Scientific classification
- Kingdom: Animalia
- Phylum: Arthropoda
- Class: Malacostraca
- Order: Isopoda
- Suborder: Oniscidea
- Family: Armadillidiidae
- Genus: Armadillidium
- Species: A. klugii

Binomial name
- Armadillidium klugii Brandt, 1833
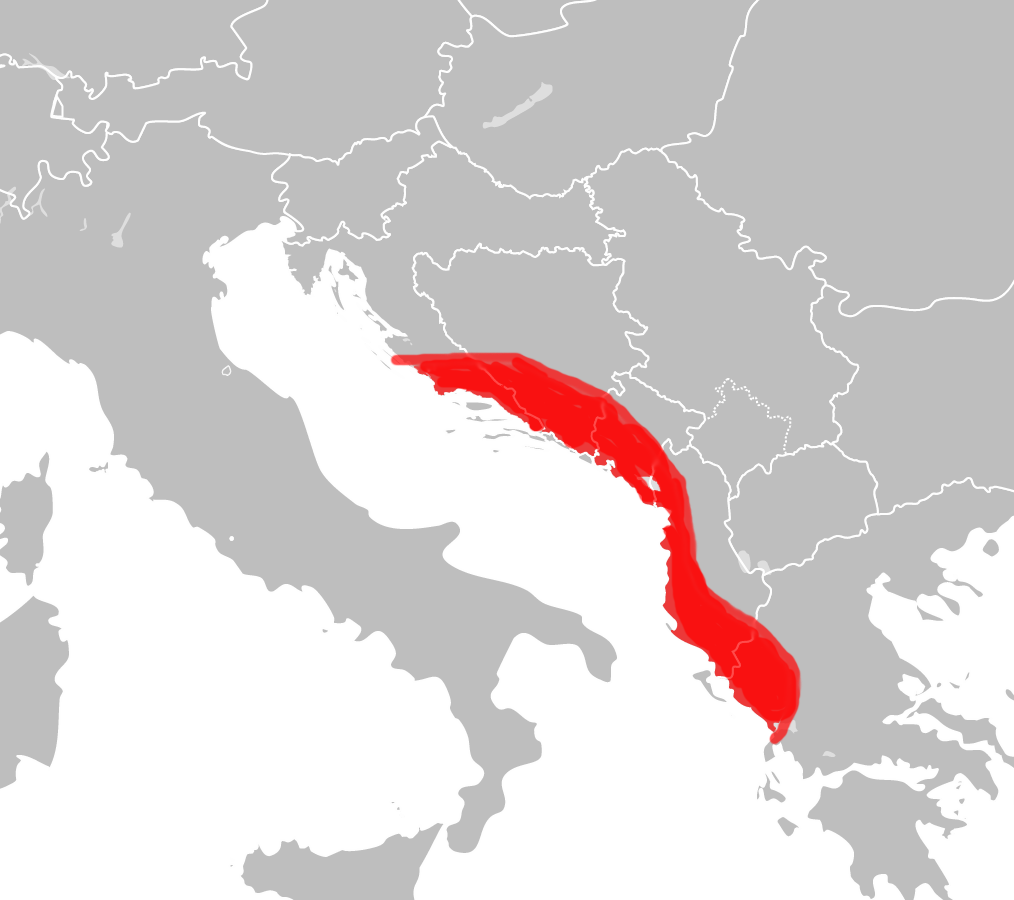
- Range

Synonyms
- Armadillo astriger C. Koch, 1841; Armadillo guttatus C. Koch, 1841; Armadillo pustulatus C. Koch, 1841; Armadillidium albanicum Verhoeff, 1901; Armadillidium inflatum Verhoeff, 1907; Armadillidium cetinjense Strouhal, 1927

= Armadillidium klugii =

Species of woodlouse

Armadillidium klugii is a lesser-known, rare Balkan, Dalmatia-based species of woodlouse, most distinguished by its colouration which resembles the red markings of the Mediterranean black widow Latrodectus tredecimguttatus. This is probably a kind of mimicry, to ward off predators that mistake the harmless animal for a venomous spider.

Due to its red, yellow or white spotting, it is often called the "clown isopod". Insect and isopod enthusiasts usually encounter them being sold as A. klugii Montenegro or variations thereof.

== Description ==
The maximum length of Armadillidium klugii is 21 millimetres, compared to Armadillidium vulgare's 18 millimetres. Unlike the typical black color of the dorsal plates of most Armadillidium species, the base coloration of A. klugii is greyish brown, and has three rows of white dots running front to back. As they age, the center row turns yellow. These pale spots are for mimicry of the Mediterranean black widow, which has similar rows.

== Distribution ==
The range of Armadillidium klugii lies along the coastline of the Adriatic sea, spanning from Croatia to Montenegro. The majority of A. klugii records are clustered in Dalmatia, in the northern end of its distribution, but 5 specimens have been reported in south Albania and west Greece. It is found under stones and in crevices.
