= Trichorhina atlasi =

Scientific classification
- Kingdom: Animalia
- Phylum: Arthropoda
- Clade: Pancrustacea
- Class: Malacostraca
- Order: Isopoda
- Suborder: Oniscidea
- Family: Platyarthridae
- Genus: Trichorhina
- Species: T. atlasi

Binomial name
- Trichorhina atlasi Vandel, 1959

Species of crustacean

Trichorhina atlasi is a species of woodlouse found in Central Morocco, throughout the Middle Atlas mountains.

== Description ==
Trichorhina atlasi has a pale pigmentation, similar to that of Trichoniscus pusillus. It has darkly pigmented eyes with eight ommatida. Its cuticle is covered in imbricate scales with the entire body being covered in fan-like shapes. It has a semi-circular telson. The antennae are relatively long.

Due to its coloration and relatively high number of ommatids, it is theorized to be a more primitive species of the Trichorhina genus, similar to Trichorhina amazonica.
