= N. capensis =

N. capensis may refer to:

- Nassarius capensis, the Cape dogwhelk, a species of sea snail in the family Nassariidae
- Neolithodes capensis, the cape stone crab, a species of king crab
- Niambia capensis, a species of woodlouse in the family Platyarthridae

== Synonyms ==
- Neoromicia capensis, a synonym of Laephotis capensis, the Cape serotine
- Nymphaea capensis, a synonym of Nymphaea nouchali var. caerulea
