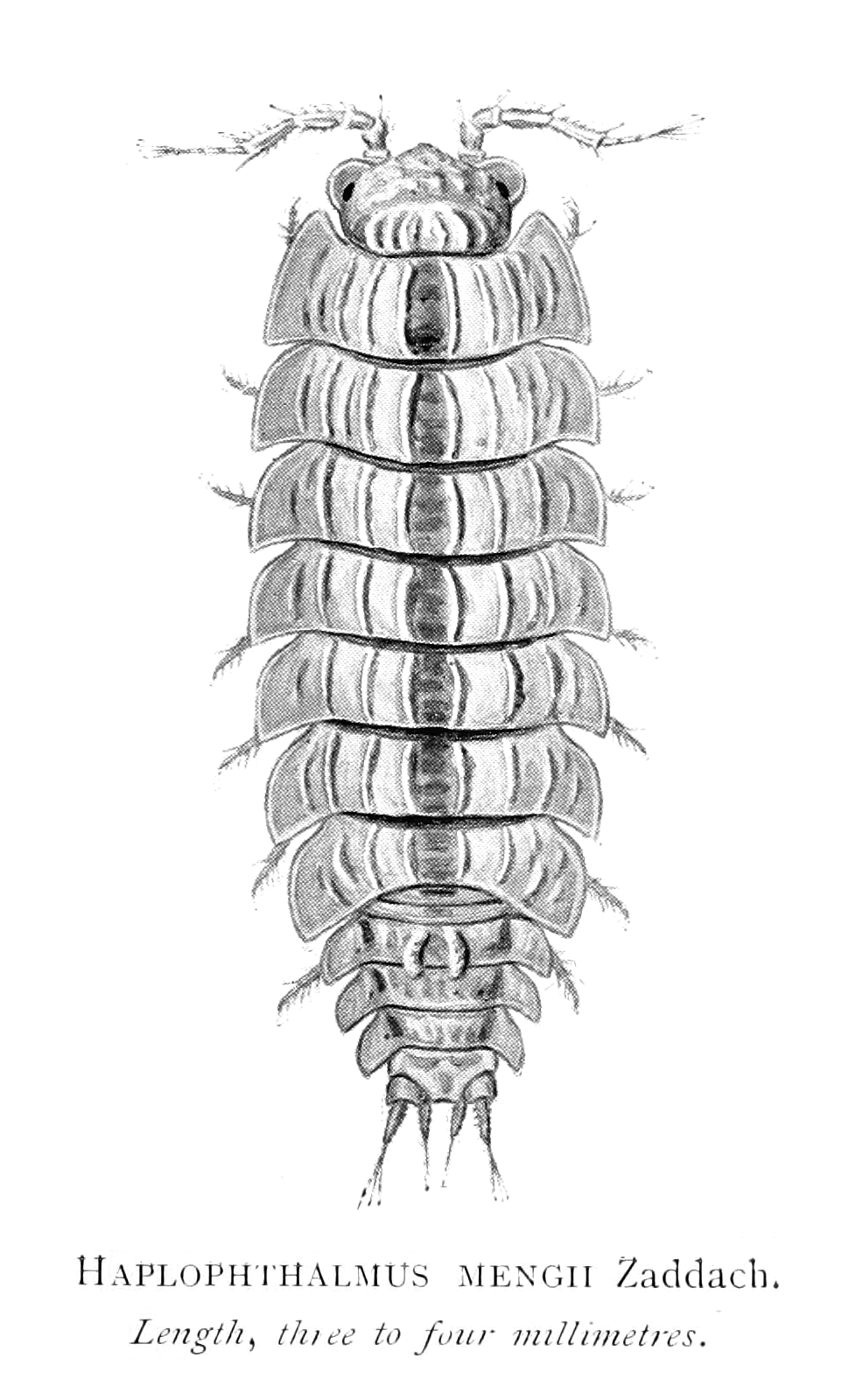
- A scientific illustration of Haplophthalmus mengii

Scientific classification
- Kingdom: Animalia
- Phylum: Arthropoda
- Clade: Pancrustacea
- Class: Malacostraca
- Order: Isopoda
- Suborder: Oniscidea
- Family: Trichoniscidae
- Genus: Haplophthalmus
- Species: H. mengii

Binomial name
- Haplophthalmus mengii (Zaddach, 1844)

Synonyms
- Haplophthalmus cottianus Verhoeff, 1936; Haplophthalmus dollfusi Verhoeff, 1901; Haplophthalmus elegans Schöbl, 1860; Haplophthalmus mengei (Zaddach, 1844); Haplophthalmus mengei africanus Vandel, 1959; Haplophthalmus mengei cottianus Verhoeff, 1936; Haplophthalmus perezi Legrand, 1943; Haplophthalmus portofinensis Verhoeff, 1908; Haplophthalmus verhoeffi Strouhal, 1948; Itea mengii Zaddach, 1844

= Haplophthalmus mengii =

Species of woodlouse

Haplophthalmus mengii, also commonly known as Menge's ridgeback, is a species of woodlouse that belongs to the family Trichoniscidae. This species can be found in Europe and Canada.

== Taxonomy ==
This species currently contains two subspecies. They are listed below:

1. Haplophthalmus mengii lagrecai Brian, 1952
2. Haplophthalmus mengii mengii (Zaddach, 1844)

== Distribution ==
This species can be found across Europe. It was believed that Haplophthalmus danicus (spurred ridgeback isopod) was the only member of the genus that can be found in North America. However it was discovered that Haplophthalmus mengii can be found in Canada. Within its range, this species can be found across a wide variety of natural and synanthropic habitats.

== Description ==
It is a small species being 4mm in length. This species has distinct longitudinal dorsal ridges and a distinct pair of dorsal projections located on the third pleonite which is similar to Haplophthalmus montivagus (Southern Ridgeback). Differentiating this species from Haplophthalmus montivagus is difficult and requires the dissection and microscopic examination of a male member of its species. When identifying a species, it is advised to always check identification derived from keys and not rely on how common a species is in an area.
