= Moserius percoi =

Conservation status
- Vulnerable (IUCN 2.3)

Scientific classification
- Kingdom: Animalia
- Phylum: Arthropoda
- Class: Malacostraca
- Order: Isopoda
- Suborder: Oniscidea
- Family: Trichoniscidae
- Genus: Moserius
- Species: M. percoi

Binomial name
- Moserius percoi Strouhal, 1940

Species of woodlouse

Moserius percoi is a species of woodlouse in the family Trichoniscidae. It is endemic to Slovenia.
