= Metatrichoniscoides nemausiensis =

Scientific classification
- Kingdom: Animalia
- Phylum: Arthropoda
- Class: Malacostraca
- Order: Isopoda
- Suborder: Oniscidea
- Family: Trichoniscidae
- Genus: Metatrichoniscoides
- Species: M. nemausiensis

Binomial name
- Metatrichoniscoides nemausiensis (Vandel, 1943)

Species of woodlouse

Metatrichoniscoides nemausiensis is a species of woodlouse in the family Trichoniscidae that is found in France.
