= Trichorhina atoyacensis =

Scientific classification
- Kingdom: Animalia
- Phylum: Arthropoda
- Class: Malacostraca
- Order: Isopoda
- Suborder: Oniscidea
- Family: Platyarthridae
- Genus: Trichorhina
- Species: T. atoyacensis

Binomial name
- Trichorhina atoyacensis Mulaik, 1960

Species of woodlouse

Trichorhina atoyacensis is a species of woodlouse found in the state of Veracruz in southern Mexico. It is named after Atoyac Cave, in Atoyac, Veracruz, where it was found.

== Description ==
It is about 3.8 mm (0.15 in) long and 1.8 mm (0.07 in) wide. It has a pale yellow to white pigmentation. The head is deeply embedded in the first pereonite. The posterior margins of the body segments are covered in fan-like scales. The telson is triangular and concave.
