= Trichorhina boliviana =

Scientific classification
- Kingdom: Animalia
- Phylum: Arthropoda
- Class: Malacostraca
- Order: Isopoda
- Suborder: Oniscidea
- Family: Platyarthridae
- Genus: Trichorhina
- Species: T. boliviana

Binomial name
- Trichorhina boliviana Vandel, 1952

Species of crustacean

Trichorhina boliviana is a species of woodlouse found throughout Bolivia. It was first described as Phalloniscus bolivianus.

== Description ==
It is 4.5 millimetres (0.18 in) long. A slight purplish-brown band runs the length of the pereon and pleon, increasing in width towards the end. The band has a small circular depigmented spot on each segment, which indicates the presence of a muscle fiber. It has a domed tergite. The pleon is recessed at the pereon and ends in a sharp point. Its telson is triangular with rounded edges and covered in large scales. The entire body is surrounded by a belt of relatively large scales.
