= Haplophthalmus abbreviatus =

Conservation status
- Vulnerable (IUCN 2.3)

Scientific classification
- Kingdom: Animalia
- Phylum: Arthropoda
- Class: Malacostraca
- Order: Isopoda
- Suborder: Oniscidea
- Family: Trichoniscidae
- Genus: Haplophthalmus
- Species: H. abbreviatus

Binomial name
- Haplophthalmus abbreviatus Verhoeff, 1928

Species of crustacean

Haplophthalmus abbreviatus is a species of woodlouse in the family Trichoniscidae. It is found in Europe & Northern Asia (excluding China).

The IUCN conservation status of Haplophthalmus abbreviatus is "VU", vulnerable. The species faces a high risk of endangerment in the medium term. The IUCN status was reviewed in 1996.

== Subspecies ==
These two subspecies belong to the species Haplophthalmus abbreviatus:

- Haplophthalmus abbreviatus abbreviatus Verhoeff, 1928
- Haplophthalmus abbreviatus aenariensis Verhoeff, 1944
