= Trichorhina anophthalma =

Scientific classification
- Kingdom: Animalia
- Phylum: Arthropoda
- Class: Malacostraca
- Order: Isopoda
- Suborder: Oniscidea
- Family: Platyarthridae
- Genus: Trichorhina
- Species: T. anophthalma

Binomial name
- Trichorhina anophthalma Arcangeli, 1936

Species of crustacean

Trichorhina anophthalma is a species of woodlouse distributed throughout southern Spain and Portugal.

== Ecology ==
T. anophthalma can be found living in caves. It is however theorized to simply be a troglophile rather than a troglobiont.
