= Trichorhina aethiopica =

Scientific classification
- Kingdom: Animalia
- Phylum: Arthropoda
- Class: Malacostraca
- Order: Isopoda
- Suborder: Oniscidea
- Family: Platyarthridae
- Genus: Trichorhina
- Species: T. aethiopica

Binomial name
- Trichorhina aethiopica Arcangeli, 1941

Species of crustacean

Trichorhina aethiopica is a species of woodlouse, originally described by A. Arcangeli in 1941. It is reported to be distributed on the banks of Caschei River in Ethiopia.
