= Brackenridgia heroldi =

Scientific classification
- Kingdom: Animalia
- Phylum: Arthropoda
- Class: Malacostraca
- Order: Isopoda
- Suborder: Oniscidea
- Family: Trichoniscidae
- Genus: Brackenridgia
- Species: B. heroldi

Binomial name
- Brackenridgia heroldi (Arcangeli, 1932)

Species of crustacean

Brackenridgia heroldi is a species of woodlouse in the family Trichoniscidae. It is found in North America.
