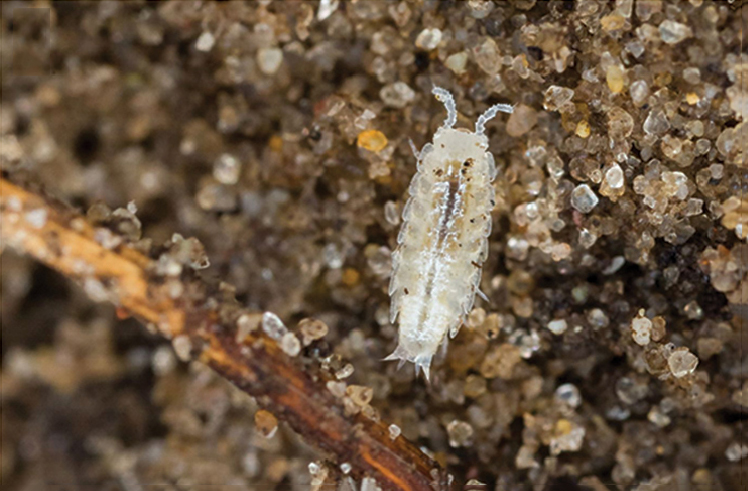

Scientific classification
- Kingdom: Animalia
- Phylum: Arthropoda
- Class: Malacostraca
- Order: Isopoda
- Suborder: Oniscidea
- Family: Trichoniscidae
- Genus: Metatrichoniscoides
- Species: M. leydigi

Binomial name
- Metatrichoniscoides leydigi (Weber, 1880)

Synonyms
- Trichoniscus leydigi

= Metatrichoniscoides leydigi =

Species of woodlouse

Metatrichoniscoides leydigi is a species of woodlouse in the family Trichoniscidae that can be found in Belgium, Sweden, the Netherlands and the Britain I.
