= Haplophthalmus montivagus =

Scientific classification
- Kingdom: Animalia
- Phylum: Arthropoda
- Clade: Pancrustacea
- Class: Malacostraca
- Order: Isopoda
- Suborder: Oniscidea
- Family: Trichoniscidae
- Genus: Haplophthalmus
- Species: H. montivagus

Binomial name
- Haplophthalmus montivagus Verhoeff, 1941

Synonyms
- Haplophthalmus legrandi Dominiak, 1961

Species of woodlouse

Haplophthalmus montivagus, also known as the southern ridgeback, is a species of woodlouse that belongs to the family Trichoniscidae. This species can be found in Europe.

== Taxonomy ==
This species contains a single subspecies: Haplophthalmus montivagus austriacus Verhoeff, 1941

== Description ==
This species has distinct longitudinal dorsal ridges and a pair of dorsal projections located on the third pleonite.

It is difficult to differentiate this species from Haplophthalmus mengii (Menge’s Ridgeback) and this species identification requires dissection and microscopic examination of males.
