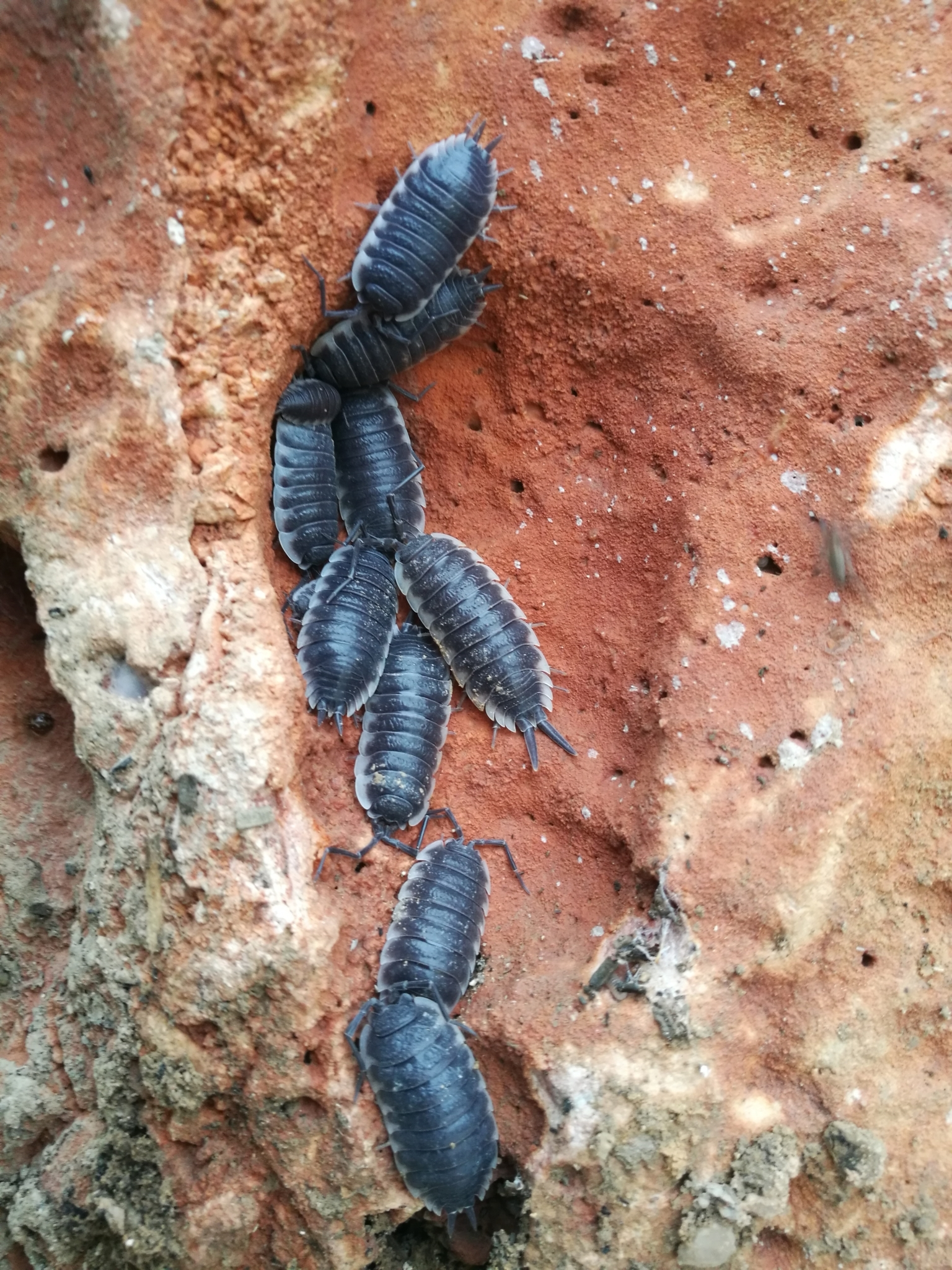

Scientific classification
- Kingdom: Animalia
- Phylum: Arthropoda
- Clade: Pancrustacea
- Class: Malacostraca
- Order: Isopoda
- Suborder: Oniscidea
- Family: Porcellionidae
- Genus: Porcellio
- Species: P. hoffmannseggii

Binomial name
- Porcellio hoffmannseggii Brandt, 1833

= Porcellio hoffmannseggii =

Species of woodlouse

Porcellio hoffmannseggii, commonly called the titan isopod, is a species of woodlouse of the genus Porcellio described in 1833. This very large species is native to the southern Iberian Peninsula, Morocco and the Balearic Islands.

Porcellio hoffmannseggii should not be confused with Platyarthrus hoffmannseggii, which is also a woodlouse, from the genus Platyarthrus. These two species share the same abbreviated binomial name of P. hoffmannseggii, which is a potential source of confusion. Porcellio hoffmannseggii may be listed with incorrect spelling as Porcellio hoffmannseggi, missing the final 'i'.

The isopod species referred to as "Porcellio sp. Sevilla" in the pet trade is believed to be a regional variant of P. hoffmannseggii.

== Appearance and physical characteristics ==
Porcellio hoffmannseggii is considered to be one of the largest terrestrial isopod species, with adults able to grow to be over 1.5 inches (3.8 cm) long. They are typically dark grey or black, with a thin white skirt around the edge of their body. Males of this species have longer uropods than females.

Porcellio hoffmannseggii is a species with multiple identified subspecies. There are current 4 identified subspecies, which are as follows:

List of subspecies
Trinomial designation	Classification author and date	Notes on subspecies
Porcellio hoffmannseggii hoffmannseggii	Brandt, 1833	
Porcellio hoffmannseggii nemethi	Paulian de Felice, 1941	
Porcellio hoffmannseggii sordidus	Budde-Lund, 1885	Considered to be a subspecies that inhabits the western Balearic Islands.
Porcellio hoffmannseggii tamarisis	Verhoeff, 1937	

== Behavior and reproduction ==
Porcellio hoffmannseggii does not conglobate like some of their other isopod cousins, commonly called pillbugs. It has been observed to guard their young after birth. The species is known to be very territorial for an isopod, which makes captive culturing more difficult.

== Distribution and habitat ==
Porcellio hoffmannseggii is common in the Oued Laou region of north-eastern Morocco, when compared to the distribution of other isopod species in the country. In addition to southern Spain and northern Morocco, this species is also native to Portugal.

Compared to other Porcellio species, this species has been observed to prefer drier environments while kept in captivity, around 30-70%.
