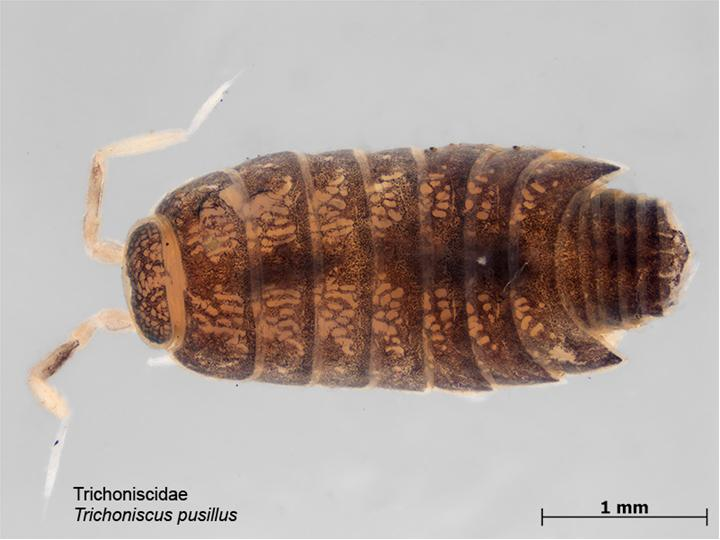

Scientific classification
- Kingdom: Animalia
- Phylum: Arthropoda
- Class: Malacostraca
- Order: Isopoda
- Suborder: Oniscidea
- Family: Trichoniscidae
- Genus: Trichoniscus
- Species: T. pusillus

Binomial name
- Trichoniscus pusillus Brandt, 1833

Synonyms
- Itea laevis; Philougria celer; Spiloniscus elisabethae; Trichoniscus caelebs; Trichoniscus coelebs; Trichoniscus elisabethae; Trichoniscus rhenanus

= Trichoniscus pusillus =

Species of woodlouse

Trichoniscus pusillus, sometimes called the common pygmy woodlouse, is one of the five most common species of woodlice in the British Isles. It is acknowledged to be the most abundant terrestrial isopod in Britain. It is found commonly across Europe north of the Alps, and has been introduced to Madeira, the Azores and North America.

== Description ==
T. pusillus may be distinguished from other British woodlice chiefly by its small size, which reaches no more than 5 millimetres (0.2 in). Its body is elongate and quite rounded in cross section, and typically purplish. It may be separated from related species in North America by its eyes of three ocelli each, rather than the single ocellus in the eyes of its relative Hyloniscus riparius.

== Reproduction ==
There are two distinct reproductive strategies within the species Trichoniscus pusillus. Many populations are, like most metazoans, bisexual and reproduce sexually; in other cases, females reproduce parthenogenetically, creating clones of themselves. The sexually reproducing form is diploid while the parthenogenetic form is triploid; since parthenogenesis always produces females, males are always diploid and can only be produced by sexual reproduction.

The frequency of males in the population decreases from south to north (a latitudinal cline) and in increasingly open habitats, with no males observed in most of Scotland and Scandinavia, but more than 15% males in the Iberian and Apennine Peninsulas.

The reproductive season lasts from March to September, and one to three breeding waves may be observed. Females are gravid for 4–5 weeks before releasing 4–18 mancae from the brood pouch.

== Ecology ==
Like other woodlice, T. pusillus eats decaying plant matter of various kinds, although only alder litter is capable of sustaining a stable reproducing population.

Predators of T. pusillus include the common shrew Sorex araneus, lycosid and dysderid spiders, centipedes such as Lithobius variegatus and perhaps carabid beetles.

Trichoniscus pusillus is susceptible to infection by isopod iridescence virus, or Iridovirus (Iridoviridae). This is first apparent as a blue sheen on the unpigmented underside of the animals, but soon spreads to give the entire exoskeleton a bluish iridescence.

== Classification ==
Several former subspecies of T. pusillus are now treated as separate species. These include Trichoniscus alticola, Trichoniscus baschierii, Trichoniscus provisorius, Trichoniscus noriucs and Trichoniscus pygmaeus.

== See also ==
- List of woodlice of the British Isles
