= Trichorhina bequaerti =

Scientific classification
- Kingdom: Animalia
- Phylum: Arthropoda
- Class: Malacostraca
- Order: Isopoda
- Suborder: Oniscidea
- Family: Platyarthridae
- Genus: Trichorhina
- Species: T. bequaerti

Binomial name
- Trichorhina bequaerti Van Name, 1936

Species of crustacean

Trichorhina bequaerti is a species of woodlouse distributed throughout Cuba. Qualitatively, it can be from 2 to 200 mm in body size.
