= Platyarthrus aiasensis =

Scientific classification
- Kingdom: Animalia
- Phylum: Arthropoda
- Class: Malacostraca
- Order: Isopoda
- Suborder: Oniscidea
- Family: Platyarthridae
- Genus: Platyarthrus
- Species: P. aiasensis

Binomial name
- Platyarthrus aiasensis Legrand, 1954

Species of crustacean

Platyarthrus aiasensis is a species of woodlouse in the family Platyarthridae. It is found in Africa, the Caribbean, Europe and Northern Asia (excluding China), North America, and temperate Asia.
