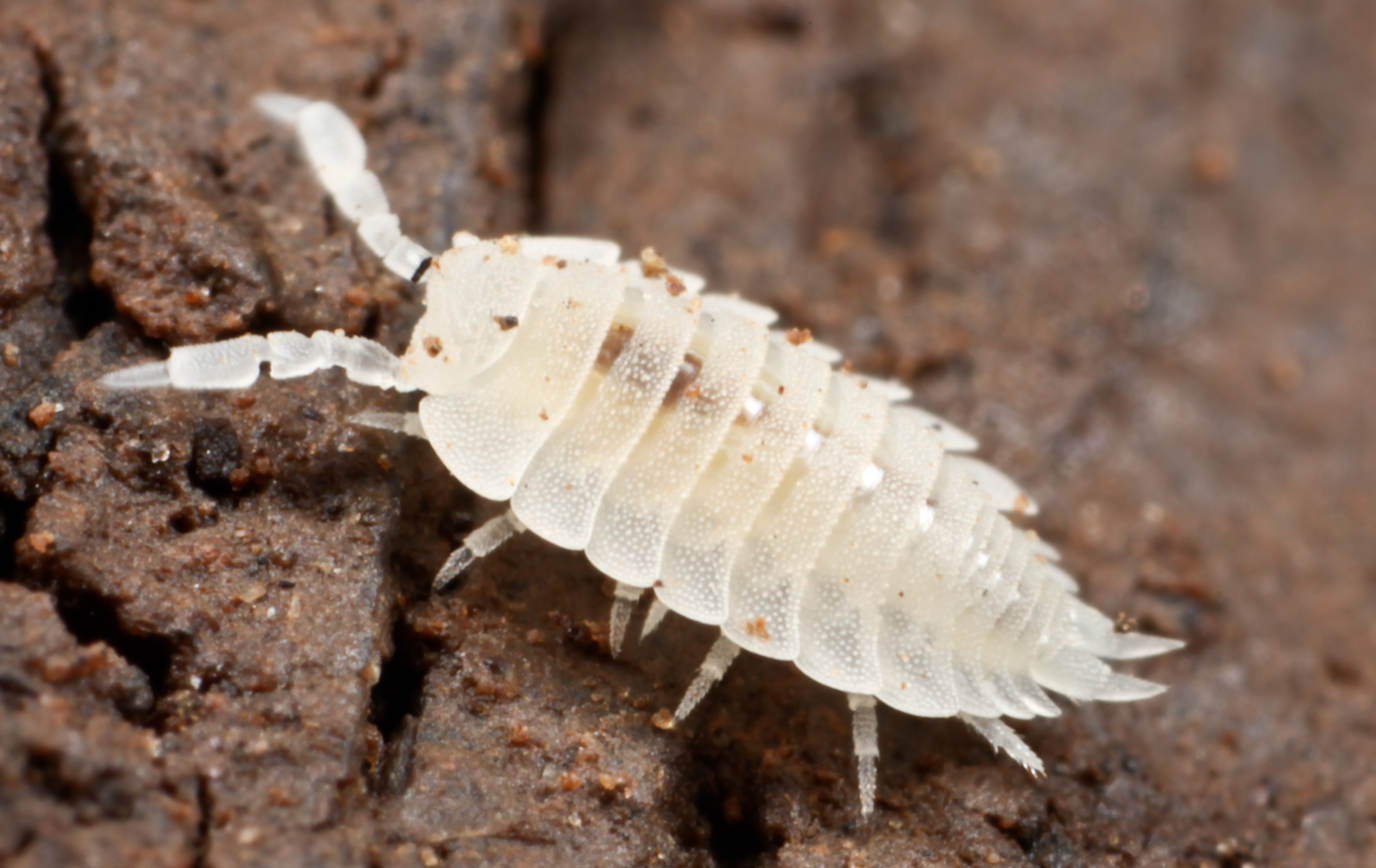

Scientific classification
- Kingdom: Animalia
- Phylum: Arthropoda
- Class: Malacostraca
- Order: Isopoda
- Suborder: Oniscidea
- Family: Platyarthridae
- Genus: Platyarthrus
- Species: P. hoffmannseggii

Binomial name
- Platyarthrus hoffmannseggii Brandt, 1833

= Platyarthrus hoffmannseggii =

Species of woodlouse

Platyarthrus hoffmannseggii is a species of woodlouse which is closely associated with ants' nests, particularly those of Lasius flavus, Lasius niger and species of Myrmica, where it feeds on ant droppings or mildew. It is white, 4 millimetres (0.16 in) long, and has a distinctive oval shape and short antennae. Its distribution appears to follow those of the ants with which it lives, and the British Isles are the north-westerly limit of its range. Elsewhere, P. hoffmannseggii extends south to the Mediterranean Sea. It is found outside Europe in North Africa and Turkey, and has been introduced to Australia and North America.

Platyarthrus hoffmannseggii should not be confused with Porcellio hoffmannseggii, whose binomial name is also abbreviated as P. hoffmannseggii and described by the same researcher. Preserved specimens are also sometimes confused with dwarf isopods of the genus Trichoniscidae, due to their small size and similar appearance.

== Physical Characteristics ==
P. hoffmannseggii is not only very small, but also considered blind. This may be due to the fact that it typically lives in ant hills, in total darkness. This species reaches about 5mm in length (about 0.2 inches).
