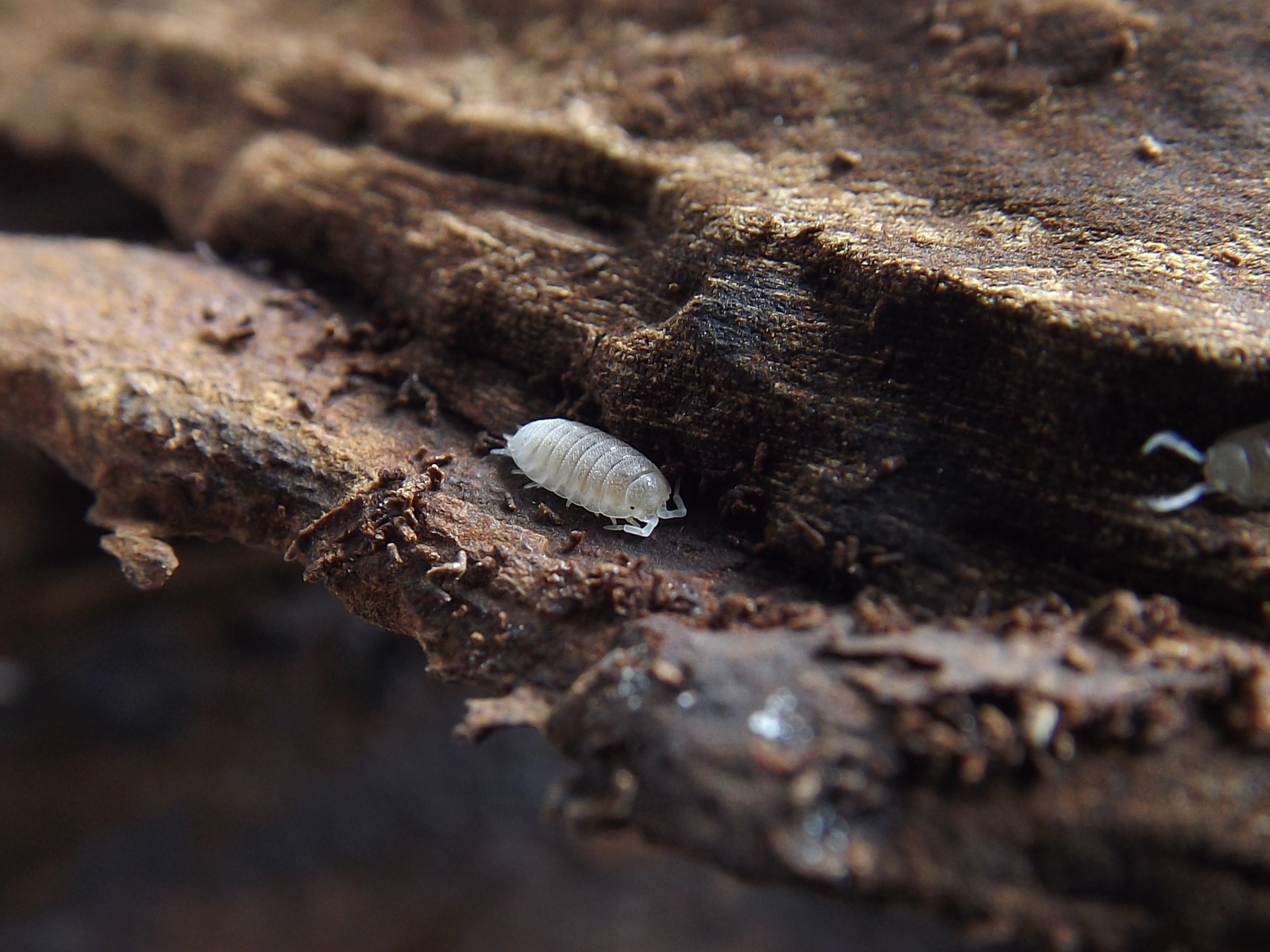

Scientific classification
- Kingdom: Animalia
- Phylum: Arthropoda
- Clade: Pancrustacea
- Class: Malacostraca
- Order: Isopoda
- Suborder: Oniscidea
- Family: Platyarthridae
- Genus: Trichorhina
- Species: T. tomentosa

Binomial name
- Trichorhina tomentosa (Budde-Lund, 1893)

Synonyms
- Alloniscus tomentosus; Bathytropa thermophila; Trichorhina monocellata; Trichorhina thermophila; Trichorhina vannamei

= Trichorhina tomentosa =

Species of crustacean

Trichorhina tomentosa, known informally as the dwarf white isopod, is a species of woodlouse in the family Platyarthridae. It is a parthenogenetic species, and only female individuals are known. Native to tropical regions throughout the Americas, dwarf white isopods have been introduced to other tropical regions worldwide.

== Description ==
Dwarf white isopods can grow to around 2–3 mm (0.079–0.118 in) in length. They are uniformly white in color, and like other members in its family, cannot roll into a ball. Like many other woodlice, dwarf white isopods prefer moist soil, feeding on detritus. Dwarf white isopods give birth asexually.

== Relationship with humans ==
=== As clean-up crews ===
Dwarf white isopods are widely favored and used in bioactive setups, along with other isopods and springtails due to ease of care, and ability to consume waste. They also provide a food source for other terrarium animals, such as dart frogs and geckos.
