= Calconiscellus gottscheensis =

Conservation status
- Vulnerable (IUCN 3.1)

Scientific classification
- Kingdom: Animalia
- Phylum: Arthropoda
- Class: Malacostraca
- Order: Isopoda
- Suborder: Oniscidea
- Family: Trichoniscidae
- Genus: Calconiscellus
- Species: C. gottscheensis

Binomial name
- Calconiscellus gottscheensis (Verhoeff, 1927)

Species of woodlouse

Calconiscellus gottscheensis is a species of woodlouse in the family Trichoniscidae that can be found in Slovenia. It is listed as vulnerable on the IUCN Red List.
