= Trichorhina acuta =

Scientific classification
- Kingdom: Animalia
- Phylum: Arthropoda
- Clade: Pancrustacea
- Class: Malacostraca
- Order: Isopoda
- Suborder: Oniscidea
- Family: Platyarthridae
- Genus: Trichorhina
- Species: T. acuta

Binomial name
- Trichorhina acuta Araujo & Buckup, 1994

Species of isopod

Trichorhina acuta is a species of woodlouse, originally described by Araujo and Buckup in 1994. Distributed throughout Brazil, it can be found living synanthropically, under dead plant matter or stones.

== Etymology ==
The name comes from the Greek prefix tri-, meaning three and the Greek word chorhina, meaning villages. It also has the Greek word acuta, meaning sharp.
