= Haplophthalmus rhinoceros =

Conservation status
- Vulnerable (IUCN 2.3)

Scientific classification
- Kingdom: Animalia
- Phylum: Arthropoda
- Class: Malacostraca
- Order: Isopoda
- Suborder: Oniscidea
- Family: Trichoniscidae
- Genus: Haplophthalmus
- Species: H. rhinoceros

Binomial name
- Haplophthalmus rhinoceros Verhoeff, 1930

Species of crustacean

Haplophthalmus rhinoceros is a species of woodlouse in the family Trichoniscidae. It is found in Europe and Northern Asia (excluding China).

The IUCN conservation status of Haplophthalmus rhinoceros is "VU", vulnerable. The species faces a high risk of endangerment in the medium term. The IUCN status was reviewed in 1996.
