= Trichorhina albida =

Scientific classification
- Kingdom: Animalia
- Phylum: Arthropoda
- Clade: Pancrustacea
- Class: Malacostraca
- Order: Isopoda
- Suborder: Oniscidea
- Family: Platyarthridae
- Genus: Trichorhina
- Species: T. albida

Binomial name
- Trichorhina albida (Budde-Lund, 1908)

Species of woodlouse

Trichorhina albida is a species of woodlouse, described from a single specimen collected in Madagascar. It is covered in short, scaly hairs, with five to six simple eyes. Its total length is 2.5 millimetres (0.098 in)

== Taxonomy ==
Trichorhina albida was described by Gustav Budde-Lund in 1908, along with numerous other Madagascan isopods (an order of crustaceans). He studied only one specimen, from a box given to him by a Mr. Chevreux, who claimed it was from Tamatave. The Integrated Taxonomic Information System reports that this species meets its minimum credibility standards, which is when "data in the record have been reviewed but are incomplete or contain accuracy, placement, or nomenclatural issues, or are from a non-peer reviewed source".

== Description ==
The body of Trichorhina albida is covered in short, scaly hairs, especially on the edges of its segments. Its eyes are small, in the form of 5–6 ocelli (simple eyes lacking a complex retina). The trunk segments are curved at the rear edge. The uropod (an appendage often used by crustaceans for locomotion) slightly exceeds the telson (last segment). The telson is short, over twice as wide as it long. The total body is 2.5 millimetres (0.098 in) long and 1 millimetre (0.039 in) wide.
