= Trichorhina argentina =

Scientific classification
- Kingdom: Animalia
- Phylum: Arthropoda
- Class: Malacostraca
- Order: Isopoda
- Suborder: Oniscidea
- Family: Platyarthridae
- Genus: Trichorhina
- Species: T. argentina

Binomial name
- Trichorhina argentina Vandel, 1963

Species of crustacean

Trichorhina argentina is a species of woodlouse found in southern Brazil and central eastern Argentina. It can be found living synantropically under stones or leaves.

== Description ==
The males can get up to 2.98 mm (0.117 in) long and 0.25 mm (0.010 in) wide. The larger females are up to 4 mm (0.16 in) long and 1.75 mm (0.07 in) wide. Their coloration is light brown, with white spots, while the uropods are generally colorless. The head, if in normal position, is partially surrounded by pereonite one. The eyes are black with five to six ommatids. Their antennules are fitted with seven to eight aesthetascs. The pleon narrows gradually after the posterior end of the pereon. The telson is triangular with an obtuse peak.
