= Trichorhina bicolor =

Scientific classification
- Kingdom: Animalia
- Phylum: Arthropoda
- Clade: Pancrustacea
- Class: Malacostraca
- Order: Isopoda
- Suborder: Oniscidea
- Family: Platyarthridae
- Genus: Trichorhina
- Species: T. bicolor

Binomial name
- Trichorhina bicolor Araujo & Buckup, 1996

Species of crustacean

Trichorhina bicolor is a species of woodlouse distributed throughout Brazil.

== Habitat ==
Trichorhina bicolor has been recorded in Brazil, in the States of Paraná and Santa Catarina. It can be found living in humid forests, below roots, in pasture areas, or under leaves. It has also been noted to be living synantropically.
