= Autrigoniscus =

Autrigoniscus Temporal range: Albian

Scientific classification
- Kingdom: Animalia
- Phylum: Arthropoda
- Clade: Pancrustacea
- Class: Malacostraca
- Order: Isopoda
- Suborder: Oniscidea
- Family: Trichoniscidae
- Genus: †Autrigoniscus; Sánchez-García, Peñalver, Delclos & Engel, 2021
- Species: †A. resinicola

Binomial name
- †Autrigoniscus resinicola Sánchez-García, Peñalver, Delclos & Engel, 2021

Extinct genus of isopods

Autrigoniscus resinicola is an extinct species of terrestrial isopod crustacean from the Albian of Spain. It is the only species in the genus Autrigoniscus.

== Paleoecology and distribution ==
Autrigoniscus resinicola was described from 3 amber fossils from the Basque-Cantabrian Basin of northern Spain. All three specimens were presumably male and one specimen had potential remnants of the digestive tract.
