= Niambia (crustacean) =

Scientific classification
- Kingdom: Animalia
- Phylum: Arthropoda
- Class: Malacostraca
- Order: Isopoda
- Suborder: Oniscidea
- Family: Platyarthridae
- Genus: Niambia; Budde-Lund, 1904

Genus of woodlice

Niambia is a genus of woodlice in the family Platyarthridae. There are at least 20 described species in Niambia.

== Species ==
These 23 species belong to the genus Niambia:

- Niambia angusta Budde-Lund, 1909^{i c g}
- Niambia brevicauda Schmalfuss & Ferrara, 1978^{i c g}
- Niambia buddelundi Barnard, 1949^{i c g}
- Niambia capensis (Dollfus, 1895)^{i c g b}
- Niambia damarensis (Panning, 1924)^{i c g}
- Niambia duffeyi Ferrara & Taiti, 1981^{i c g}
- Niambia eburnea (Vandel, 1953)^{i c g}
- Niambia flavescens Barnard, 1924^{i c g}
- Niambia formicarum Barnard, 1932^{i c g}
- Niambia griseoflava Barnard, 1924^{i c g}
- Niambia lata Barnard, 1932^{c g}
- Niambia longiantennata Taiti & Ferrara, 1991^{i c g}
- Niambia longicauda Barnard, 1924^{i c g}
- Niambia microps Barnard, 1932^{c g}
- Niambia modesta Budde-Lund, 1909^{i c g}
- Niambia pallida Budde-Lund, 1909^{i c g}
- Niambia palmetensis Vandel, 1959^{i c g}
- Niambia politus Omer-Cooper, 1924^{i g}
- Niambia senegalensis Schmalfuss & Ferrara, 1978^{i c g}
- Niambia septentrionalis Taiti & Ferrara, 2004^{c g}
- Niambia squamata (Budde-Lund, 1885)^{i c g}
- Niambia termitophila Kensley, 1971^{i c g}
- Niambia truncata (Brandt, 1833)^{i c g}

Data sources: i = ITIS, c = Catalogue of Life, g = GBIF, b = Bugguide.net
