= Moserius =

Scientific classification
- Kingdom: Animalia
- Phylum: Arthropoda
- Class: Malacostraca
- Order: Isopoda
- Suborder: Oniscidea
- Family: Trichoniscidae
- Genus: Moserius; Strouhal, 1940

Genus of woodlice

Moserius is a genus of crustacean in family Trichoniscidae, with two described species:

There are five described species:

- Moserius elbanus Taiti & Ferrara, 1995
- Moserius gruberae Taiti & Montesanto, 2018
- Moserius inexpectatus Reboleira & Taiti, 2015
- Moserius percoi Strouhal, 1940
- Moserius talamonensis Taiti & Montesanto, 2018
