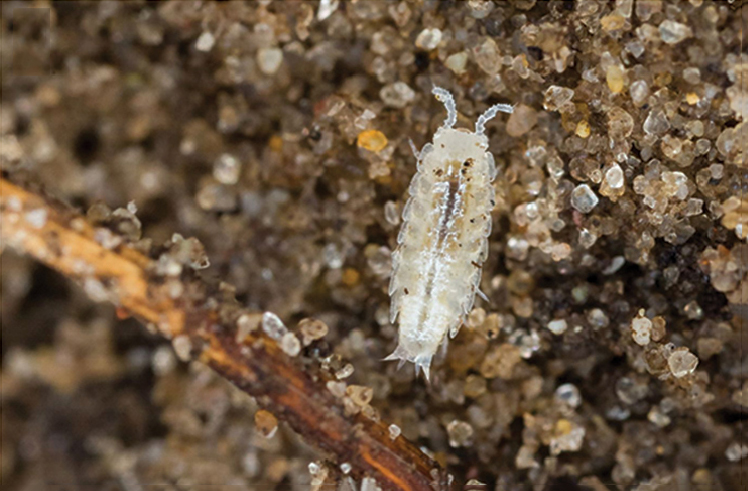
- Metatrichoniscoides leydigii

Scientific classification
- Kingdom: Animalia
- Phylum: Arthropoda
- Class: Malacostraca
- Order: Isopoda
- Suborder: Oniscidea
- Family: Trichoniscidae
- Genus: Metatrichoniscoides; Vandel, 1943

= Metatrichoniscoides =

Genus of woodlice

Metatrichoniscoides is a genus of isopod crustacean in family Trichoniscidae.

There are five recognised species:

- Metatrichoniscoides celticus Oliver & Trew, 1981
- Metatrichoniscoides fouresi Vandel, 1950
- Metatrichoniscoides leydigi (Weber, 1880)
- Metatrichoniscoides nemausiensis Vandel, 1943
- Metatrichoniscoides salirensis Reboleira & Taiti, 2015
