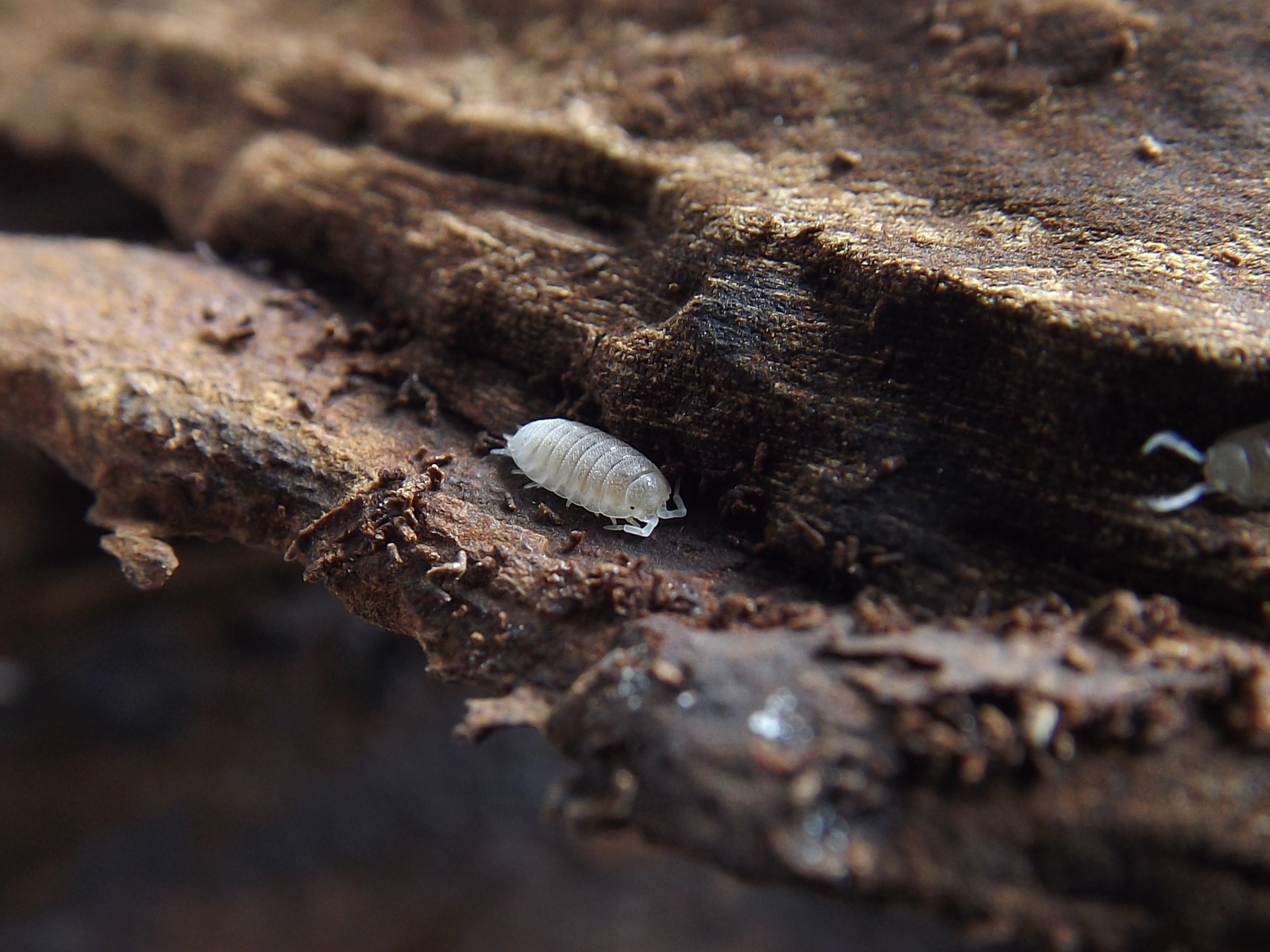
- Trichorhina tomentosa

Scientific classification
- Kingdom: Animalia
- Phylum: Arthropoda
- Class: Malacostraca
- Order: Isopoda
- Suborder: Oniscidea
- Family: Platyarthridae
- Genus: Trichorhina; Budde-Lund, 1908

= Trichorhina =

Genus of crustacean

Trichorhina is a genus of woodlice in the family Platyarthridae.

== Species ==
Trichorhina includes the following species:

- Trichorhina acuta
- Trichorhina aethiopica
- Trichorhina albida
- Trichorhina amazonica
- Trichorhina anophthalma
- Trichorhina argentina
- Trichorhina atlasi
- Trichorhina atoyacensis
- Trichorhina bequaerti
- Trichorhina bicolor
- Trichorhina boliviana
- Trichorhina boneti
- Trichorhina brasiliensis
- Trichorhina buchnerorum
- Trichorhina caeca
- Trichorhina dobrogica
- Trichorhina donaldsoni
- Trichorhina giannellii
- Trichorhina guanophila
- Trichorhina heterophthalma
- Trichorhina hispana
- Trichorhina hoestlandti
- Trichorhina hospes
- Trichorhina isthmica
- Trichorhina kribensis
- Trichorhina lobata
- Trichorhina macrophthalma
- Trichorhina macrops
- Trichorhina marianii
- Trichorhina micros
- Trichorhina minima
- Trichorhina minutissima
- Trichorhina mulaiki
- Trichorhina pallida
- Trichorhina paolae
- Trichorhina papillosa
- Trichorhina paraensis
- Trichorhina pearsei
- Trichorhina pittieri
- Trichorhina pubescens
- Trichorhina quisquiliarum
- Trichorhina sicula
- Trichorhina simoni
- Trichorhina squamapleotelsona
- Trichorhina squamata
- Trichorhina tomentosa
- Trichorhina triocellata
- Trichorhina triocis
- Trichorhina tropica
- Trichorhina tropicalis
- Trichorhina vandeli
- Trichorhina xoltumae
- Trichorhina zimapanensis
