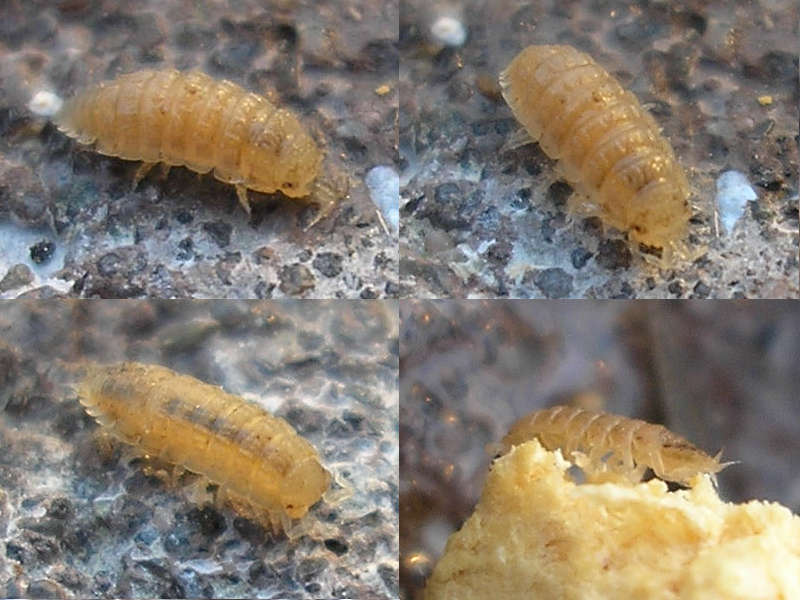

Scientific classification
- Kingdom: Animalia
- Phylum: Arthropoda
- Clade: Pancrustacea
- Class: Malacostraca
- Order: Isopoda
- Suborder: Oniscidea
- Family: Trichoniscidae
- Genus: Haplophthalmus
- Species: H. danicus

Binomial name
- Haplophthalmus danicus Budde-Lund, 1879

= Haplophthalmus danicus =

Species of woodlice

Haplophthalmus danicus, also known as the terrestrial cave isopod or spurred ridgeback isopod, is a species of woodlouse that belongs to the family Trichoniscidae. It is naturally found in Europe, Southern Asia, and temperate Asia, however it has been introduced to North America. This species was likely introduced during original European settlement, and therefore has been well established in terrestrial communities.

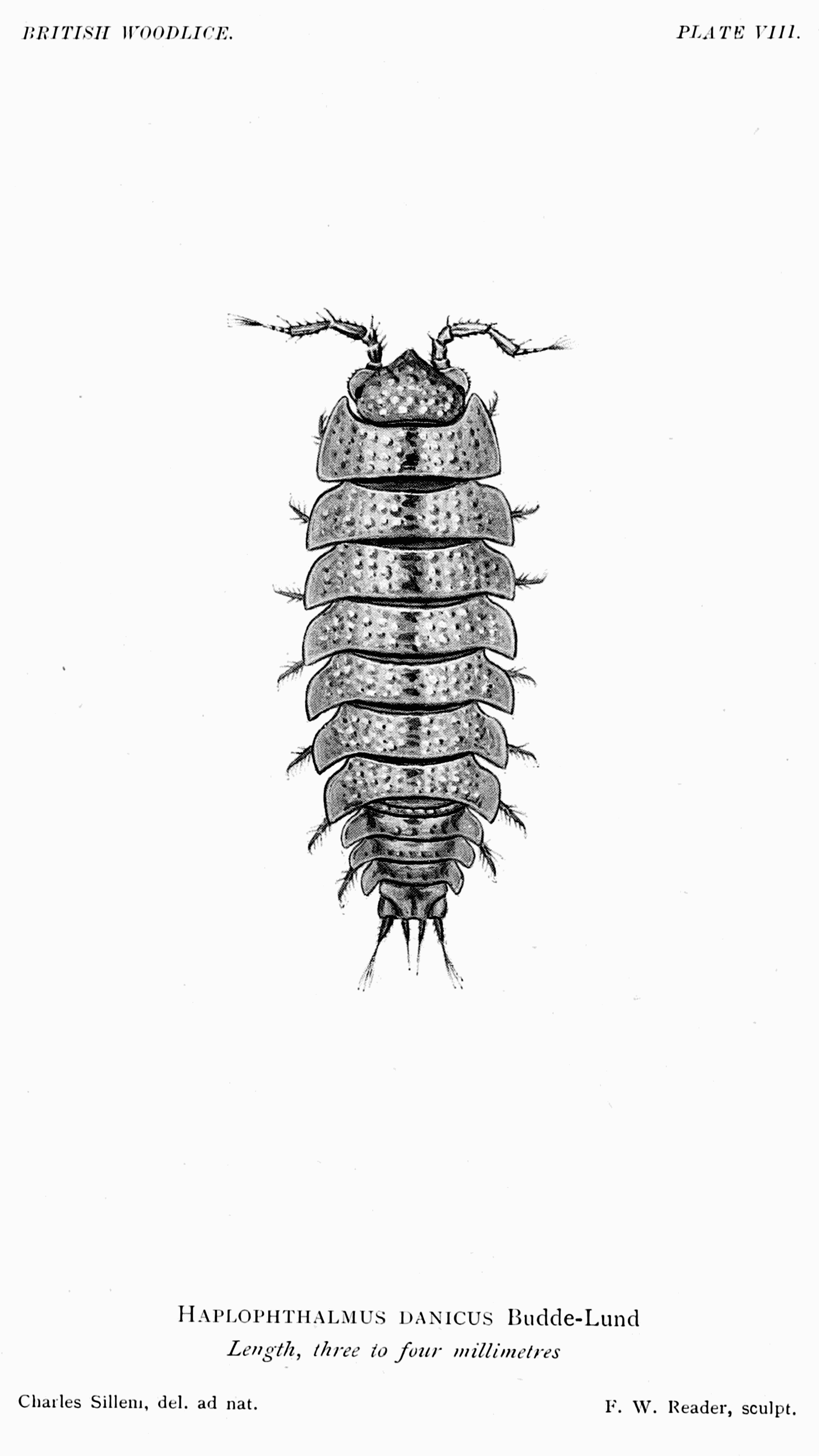
Terrestrial cave isopod, Haplophthalmus danicus

== Subspecies ==
These seven subspecies belong to the species Haplophthalmus danicus:

- Haplophthalmus danicus armenius Collinge, 1918
- Haplophthalmus danicus bagnalli Collinge, 1946
- Haplophthalmus danicus danicus Budde-Lund, 1880
- Haplophthalmus danicus rufus Arcangeli, 1960
- Haplophthalmus danicus tauricus Frankenberger, 1950
- Haplophthalmus danicus transsilvanicus Verhoeff, 1908
- Haplophthalmus danicus virescens Collinge, 1918
