= Trichorhina amazonica =

Scientific classification
- Kingdom: Animalia
- Phylum: Arthropoda
- Class: Malacostraca
- Order: Isopoda
- Suborder: Oniscidea
- Family: Platyarthridae
- Genus: Trichorhina
- Species: T. amazonica

Binomial name
- Trichorhina amazonica Souza-Kury, 1997

Species of woodlouse

Trichorhina amazonica is a species of woodlouse, distributed throughout North-Eastern Brazil.

== Description ==
It is described as being brown with small brown spots on its head. The entire isopod is covered in fan-like scales, with the male reported as being 3.03 mm long and 1.24 mm wide. Its eyes have 10 ommatids and have a dark brown colour. The anterior margins of pereonite one reach the eyes. Its pleon outline is continuous with the pereon and the telson is reported to be sub-triangular and slightly concave. The antennae can reach pereonite two if stretched. The anennulae are each fitted with five aesthetascs. Due to its relatively high amount of ommatids it is theorized to be a more primitive member of the Trichorhina genus.
