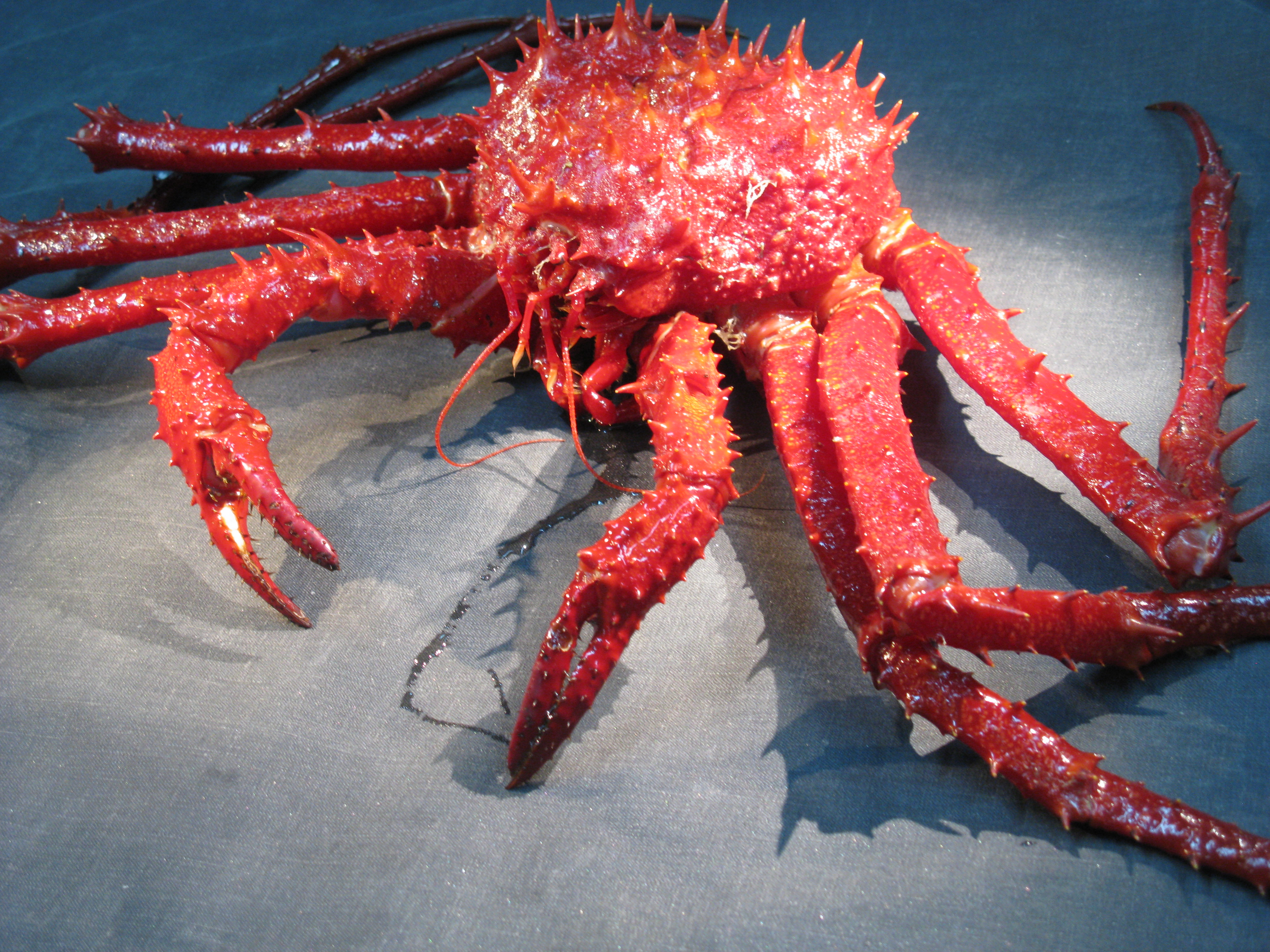

Scientific classification
- Kingdom: Animalia
- Phylum: Arthropoda
- Clade: Pancrustacea
- Class: Malacostraca
- Order: Decapoda
- Suborder: Pleocyemata
- Infraorder: Anomura
- Family: Lithodidae
- Genus: Neolithodes
- Species: N. yaldwyni

Binomial name
- Neolithodes yaldwyni Ahyong & Dawson, 2006

= Neolithodes yaldwyni =

Species of king crab

Neolithodes yaldwyni is a species of king crab that is found in the Ross Sea from depths of 124–1,950 metres (407–6,398 ft). It had previously been misidentified as Neolithodes brodiei, and it closely resembles Neolithodes capensis.

== Description ==
Neolithodes yaldwyni is deep-red in colour. It has a pyriform carapace which has been measured as large as 170.4 mm (6.71 in) in length (Note: 146.1 mm (5.75 in) not including the rostrum.) and 135.6 mm (5.34 in) in width. The dorsal surface has thick, conical spines sparsely interspersed with granules. The second segment of the abdomen is covered in long spines toward the middle and teeth at the outer edge. The third through fifth abdominal segments are covered with multiple spines or nodules in males and with stout, well-spaced spines in females. Its appearance is nearly identical to that of N. capensis with the exceptions of its walking legs, which feature proportionally longer dactyli, and its spines, which are more pronounced.

== Distribution ==
Neolithodes yaldwyni is known from Antarctica's Ross Sea at depths between 124–1,950 m (407–6,398 ft). A record from the Bellingshausen Sea initially attributed to N. capensis may also be referable to N. yaldwyni.

Along with Paralomis birsteini, it is believed to be an invasive species, and there are fears that global warming could allow it to enter the Antarctic continental shelf within the coming decades and damage the ecosystem's native fauna. The invertebrate macrofauna of the Antarctic continental shelf are largely either slow-moving or completely sessile and are not adequately adapted to the shell-crushing predators which typically live deeper in the ocean, meaning that they could be uniquely vulnerable to king crabs were they to emerge from the bathyal zone. This hypothesis has been disputed under the contention that, rather than having been driven out of the Antarctic 40 to 15 million years ago and only now returning to colonise it, king crabs have "a long and enduring existence in the region" and that, if they were to colonise the shelf, their diets may not pose much risk to sedentary invertebrates.

== Taxonomy ==
Neolithodes yaldwyni was first described in 2006 by carcinologists Shane T. Ahyong and Elliot W. Dawson. Along with N. capensis, N. diomedeae, N. grimaldii, and N. vinogradovi, it belongs to a subgroup of Neolithodes in which "the carapace and [walking] legs at most bear scattered, minute secondary spines or tubercles amongst the primary dorsal spines". Its specific name "yaldwyni" honours New Zealander carcinologist John Cameron Yaldwyn.
