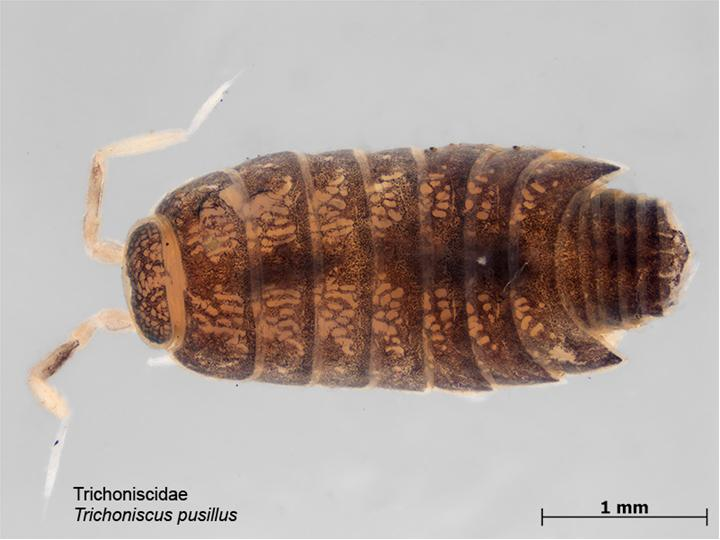
- Trichoniscus pusillus

Scientific classification
- Kingdom: Animalia
- Phylum: Arthropoda
- Class: Malacostraca
- Order: Isopoda
- Suborder: Oniscidea
- Family: Trichoniscidae
- Genus: Trichoniscus; Brandt, 1833

Species
- Over 100; see text

= Trichoniscus =

Genus of woodlice

Trichoniscus is a genus of woodlice. It contains over 100 species, including the common pygmy woodlouse, Trichoniscus pusillus:

- Trichoniscus aenariensis Verhoeff, 1942
- Trichoniscus alemannicus Verhoeff, 1917
- Trichoniscus alexandrae Caruso, 1978
- Trichoniscus alticola Legrand, Strouhal & Vandel, 1950
- Trichoniscus anophthalmus Vandel, 1965
- Trichoniscus apenninicus Taiti & Ferrara, 1995
- Trichoniscus aphonicus Borutzky, 1977
- Trichoniscus asper Menge, 1854
- Trichoniscus baschierii Brian, 1953
- Trichoniscus bassoti Vandel, 1960
- Trichoniscus beroni Andreev, 1985
- Trichoniscus beschkovi Andreev, 1986
- Trichoniscus biformatus Racovitza, 1908
- Trichoniscus bogovinae Pljakić, 1970
- Trichoniscus bononiensis Vandel, 1965
- Trichoniscus bosniensis Verhoeff, 1901
- Trichoniscus bulgaricus Andreev, 1970
- Trichoniscus bureschi Verhoeff, 1926
- Trichoniscus buturovici Pljakić, 1972
- Trichoniscus callorii Brian, 1954
- Trichoniscus carniolicus Strouhal, 1939
- Trichoniscus carpaticus Tabacaru, 1974
- Trichoniscus castanearum Verhoeff, 1952
- Trichoniscus cavernicola Vandel, 1958
- Trichoniscus chasmatophilus Strouhal, 1936
- Trichoniscus circuliger Verhoeff, 1931
- Trichoniscus coiffaiti Vandel, 1955
- Trichoniscus corcyraeus Verhoeff, 1901
- Trichoniscus crassipes Verhoeff, 1939
- Trichoniscus craterium Verhoeff, 1942
- Trichoniscus dancaui Tabacaru, 1996
- Trichoniscus darwini Vandel, 1938
- Trichoniscus demivirgo Blake, 1931
- Trichoniscus dragani Tabacaru, 1974
- Trichoniscus epomeanus Verhoeff, 1942
- Trichoniscus foveolatus Vandel, 1950
- Trichoniscus fragilis Racovitza, 1908
- Trichoniscus gachassini (Giard, 1899)
- Trichoniscus garevi Andreev, 2000
- Trichoniscus ghidinii Brian, 1931
- Trichoniscus gordoni Vandel, 1955
- Trichoniscus gudauticus Borutzky, 1977
- Trichoniscus halophilus Vandel, 1951
- Trichoniscus heracleotis Strouhal, 1971
- Trichoniscus heroldii Verhoeff, 1931
- Trichoniscus hoctuni Mulaik, 1960
- Trichoniscus illyricus Verhoeff, 1931
- Trichoniscus inferus Verhoeff, 1908
- Trichoniscus intermedius Vandel, 1958
- Trichoniscus jeanneli Vandel, 1955
- Trichoniscus karawankianus Verhoeff, 1939
- Trichoniscus korsakovi Vandel, 1947
- Trichoniscus lazzaronius Verhoeff, 1952
- Trichoniscus licodrensis Pljakić, 1977
- Trichoniscus lindbergi Vandel, 1958
- Trichoniscus litorivagus Verhoeff, 1944
- Trichoniscus maremmanus Taiti & Ferrara, 1995
- Trichoniscus maritimus Verhoeff, 1930
- Trichoniscus matulici Verhoeff, 1901
- Trichoniscus muscivagus Verhoeff, 1917
- Trichoniscus naissensis Pljakić, 1977
- Trichoniscus neapolitanus Verhoeff, 1952
- Trichoniscus nicaensis Legrand, 1953
- Trichoniscus nivatus Verhoeff, 1917
- Trichoniscus noricus Verhoeff, 1917
- Trichoniscus oedipus Sfenthourakis, 1995
- Trichoniscus orchidicola Mulaik, 1960
- Trichoniscus pancici Pljakić, 1977
- Trichoniscus pavani Brian, 1938
- Trichoniscus pedronensis Vandel, 1947
- Trichoniscus petrovi Andreev, 2002
- Trichoniscus peyerimhoffi Vandel, 1955
- Trichoniscus provisorius Racovitza, 1908
- Trichoniscus pseudopusillus Arcangeli, 1929
- Trichoniscus pusillus Brandt, 1833
- Trichoniscus pygmaeus Sars, 1898
- Trichoniscus racovitzai Tabacaru, 1994
- Trichoniscus raitchevi Andreev & Tabacaru, 1972
- Trichoniscus rhodiensis Arcangeli, 1934
- Trichoniscus rhodopiensis Vandel, 1965
- Trichoniscus riparianus Verhoeff, 1936
- Trichoniscus scheerpeltzi Strouhal, 1958
- Trichoniscus semigranulatus Buturović, 1954
- Trichoniscus serbicus Pljakić, 1970
- Trichoniscus serboorientalis Pljakić, 1977
- Trichoniscus simplicifrons Verhoeff, 1901
- Trichoniscus soloisensis Vandel, 1959
- Trichoniscus stammeri Verhoeff, 1932
- Trichoniscus steinboecki Verhoeff, 1931
- Trichoniscus stoevi Andreev, 2002
- Trichoniscus strasseri Verhoeff, 1938
- Trichoniscus styricus Strouhal, 1958
- Trichoniscus sulcatus Verhoeff, 1917
- Trichoniscus tenebrarum Verhoeff, 1926
- Trichoniscus thielei Verhoeff, 1901
- Trichoniscus tranteevi Andreev, 2000
- Trichoniscus tuberculatus Tabacaru, 1996
- Trichoniscus valkanovi Andreev, 1985
- Trichoniscus vandeli Tabacaru, 1996
- Trichoniscus verhoeffi Dahl, 1919
- Trichoniscus voltai Arcangeli, 1948
- Trichoniscus vulcanius Verhoeff, 1942
- Trichoniscus zangherii Arcangeli, 1952
