= Calconiscellus =

Scientific classification
- Kingdom: Animalia
- Phylum: Arthropoda
- Class: Malacostraca
- Order: Isopoda
- Suborder: Oniscidea
- Family: Trichoniscidae
- Genus: Calconiscellus; Verhoeff, 1927

Species
- See text

Genus of woodlice

Calconiscellus is a genus of crustacean in family Trichoniscidae. One species, C. gotscheensis, is listed as vulnerable on the IUCN Red List.

== Species ==
There are seven recognised species:

- Calconiscellus bertkaui (Verhoeff, 1901)
- Calconiscellus castelmartius (Verhoeff, 1938)
- Calconiscellus gibbosus (Carl, 1908)
- Calconiscellus gottscheensis (Verhoeff, 1927) (Gottschee, now Kočevje, Slovenia)
- Calconiscellus karawankianus (Verhoeff, 1908) (south slope of Karawanken)
- Calconiscellus malanchinii Arcangeli, 1948
- Calconiscellus zanerae Brian, 1954
