= Trichorhina mulaiki =

Scientific classification
- Kingdom: Animalia
- Phylum: Arthropoda
- Clade: Pancrustacea
- Class: Malacostraca
- Order: Isopoda
- Suborder: Oniscidea
- Family: Platyarthridae
- Genus: Trichorhina
- Species: T. mulaiki

Binomial name
- Trichorhina mulaiki Schmalfuss, 2003

Synonyms
- Mexicostylus squamatus Verhoeff, 1933; Trichorhina squamata – preoccupied by Trichorhina squamata Verhoeff, 1926

Species of woodlouse

Trichorhina mulaiki is a species of woodlouse in the family Platyarthridae.

== Distribution ==
Trichorhina mulaiki was found near Chilapa de Álvarez, Guerrero, Mexico, where it lives in humus in montane forests.

== Taxonomic history ==
The species was first described by Karl Wilhelm Verhoeff in 1933, as Mexicostylus squamatus. M. squamatus was the only species in the genus Mexicostylus, but that genus was later synonymised with the genus Trichorhina. Since that genus already contained a species T. squamata, a new name had to be provided, and so the species became Trichorhina mulaiki.
