= Brackenridgia =

Scientific classification
- Kingdom: Animalia
- Phylum: Arthropoda
- Class: Malacostraca
- Order: Isopoda
- Suborder: Oniscidea
- Family: Trichoniscidae
- Genus: Brackenridgia; Ulrich, 1902

Genus of crustaceans

Brackenridgia is a genus of woodlice in the family Trichoniscidae. There are about nine described species in Brackenridgia.

== Species ==
These nine species belong to the genus Brackenridgia:

- Brackenridgia acostai (Rioja, 1951)
- Brackenridgia ashleyi Lewis, 2004
- Brackenridgia bridgesi (Van Name, 1942)
- Brackenridgia cavernarum Ulrich, 1902
- Brackenridgia heroldi (Arcangeli, 1932)
- Brackenridgia palmitensis Mulaik, 1960
- Brackenridgia reddelli (Vandel, 1965)
- Brackenridgia sphinxensis Schultz, 1984
- Brackenridgia villalobosi Rioja, 1950
