= Hyloniscus =

Scientific classification
- Kingdom: Animalia
- Phylum: Arthropoda
- Class: Malacostraca
- Order: Isopoda
- Suborder: Oniscidea
- Family: Trichoniscidae
- Genus: Hyloniscus; Verhoeff, 1908

Genus of woodlice

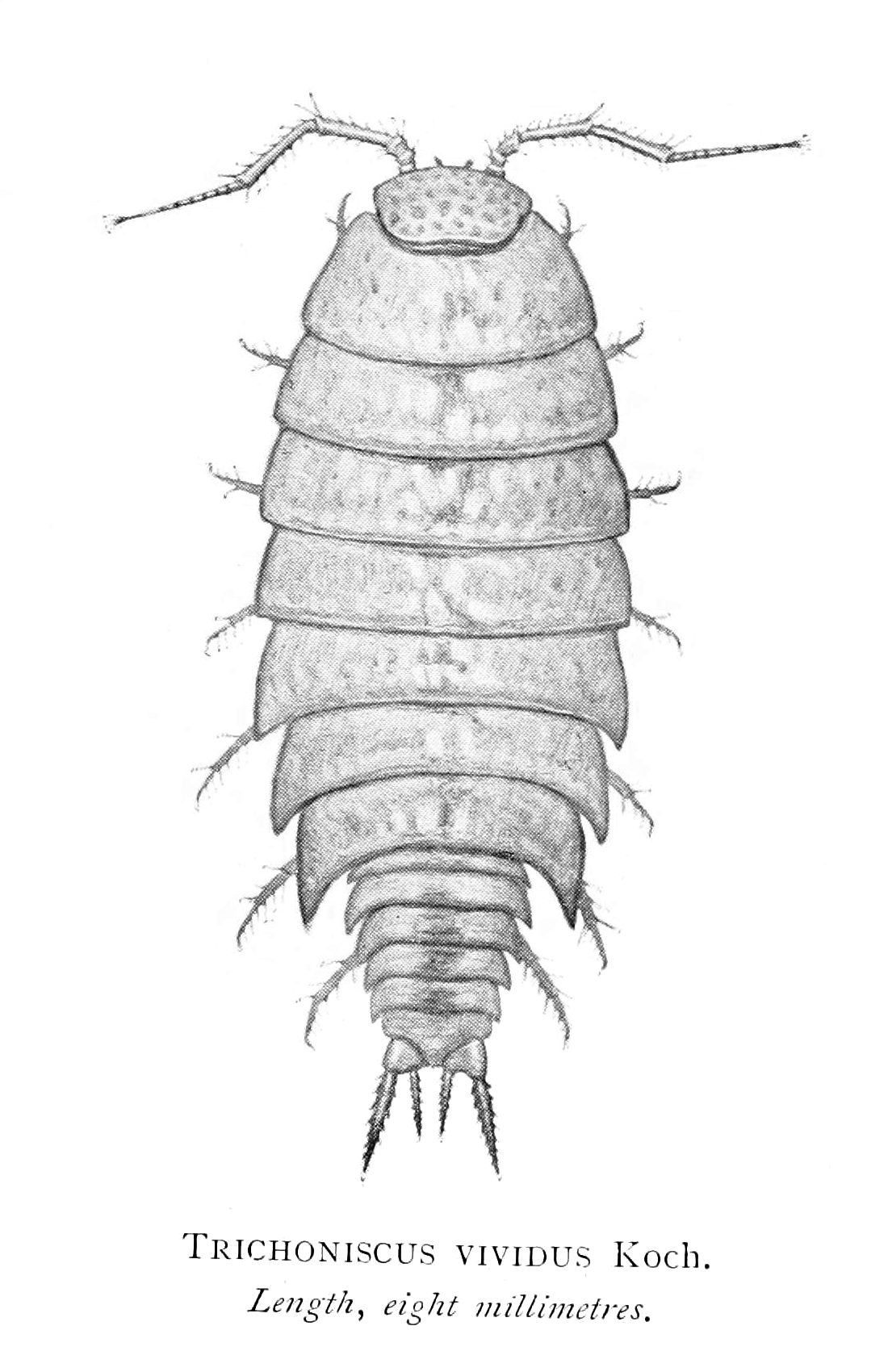
Scientific illustration of Hyloniscus vividus.

Hyloniscus is a genus of woodlice belonging to the family Trichoniscidae. Its members are found across Europe and North America.

== Species ==
The genus contains the following species:

- Hyloniscus adonis Verhoeff, 1927
- Hyloniscus beckeri Herold, 1939
- Hyloniscus beckeri Verhoeff, 1926
- Hyloniscus dacicus Tabacaru, 1972
- Hyloniscus dalmaticus Verhoeff, 1930
- Hyloniscus flammula Vandel, 1965
- Hyloniscus flammuloides Tabacaru, 1972
- Hyloniscus inflatus Verhoeff, 1927
- Hyloniscus kopaonicensis Buturović, 1960
- Hyloniscus kossovensis Pljakić, 1977
- Hyloniscus macedonicus Verhoeff, 1933
- Hyloniscus marani Frankenberger, 1940
- Hyloniscus marginalis Verhoeff, 1901
- Hyloniscus mariae Verhoeff, 1908
- Hyloniscus motasi Radu, 1976
- Hyloniscus pilifer Verhoeff, 1933
- Hyloniscus pugionum Verhoeff, 1926
- Hyloniscus refugiorum Verhoeff, 1933
- Hyloniscus rilensis Mehely, 1929
- Hyloniscus riparius C. Koch, 1838
- Hyloniscus siculus Mehely, 1929
- Hyloniscus stankovici Pljakić, 1972
- Hyloniscus taborskyi Frankenberger, 1940
- Hyloniscus transsilvanicus Verhoeff, 1901
- Hyloniscus travnicensis Buturović, 1955
- Hyloniscus vividus C. Koch, 1841
