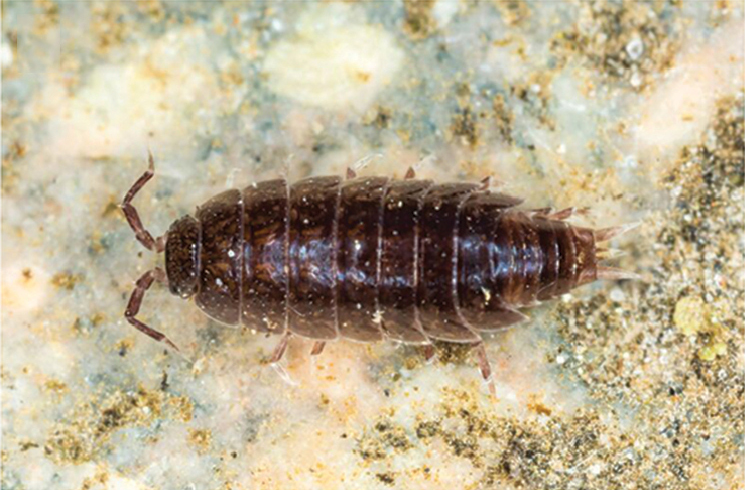

Scientific classification
- Kingdom: Animalia
- Phylum: Arthropoda
- Class: Malacostraca
- Order: Isopoda
- Suborder: Oniscidea
- Family: Trichoniscidae
- Genus: Hyloniscus
- Species: H. riparius

Binomial name
- Hyloniscus riparius (Koch, 1838)

Synonyms
- Hyloniscus germanicus; Itea riparus; Philoscia notata; Trichoniscus germanicus; Trichoniscus montanus; Trichoniscus notatus; Trichoniscus riparius; Trichoniscus tirolensis; Trichoniscus violaceus

= Hyloniscus riparius =

Species of woodlouse

Hyloniscus riparius is a species of woodlouse found in Central and Eastern Europe and subsequently introduced to North America. It is strongly associated with flood plains and can tolerate periods of up to eight weeks submerged under water. In North America, it was first found at St. John's, Newfoundland in 1951, and later in New York, New Jersey, Pennsylvania and North Carolina.
