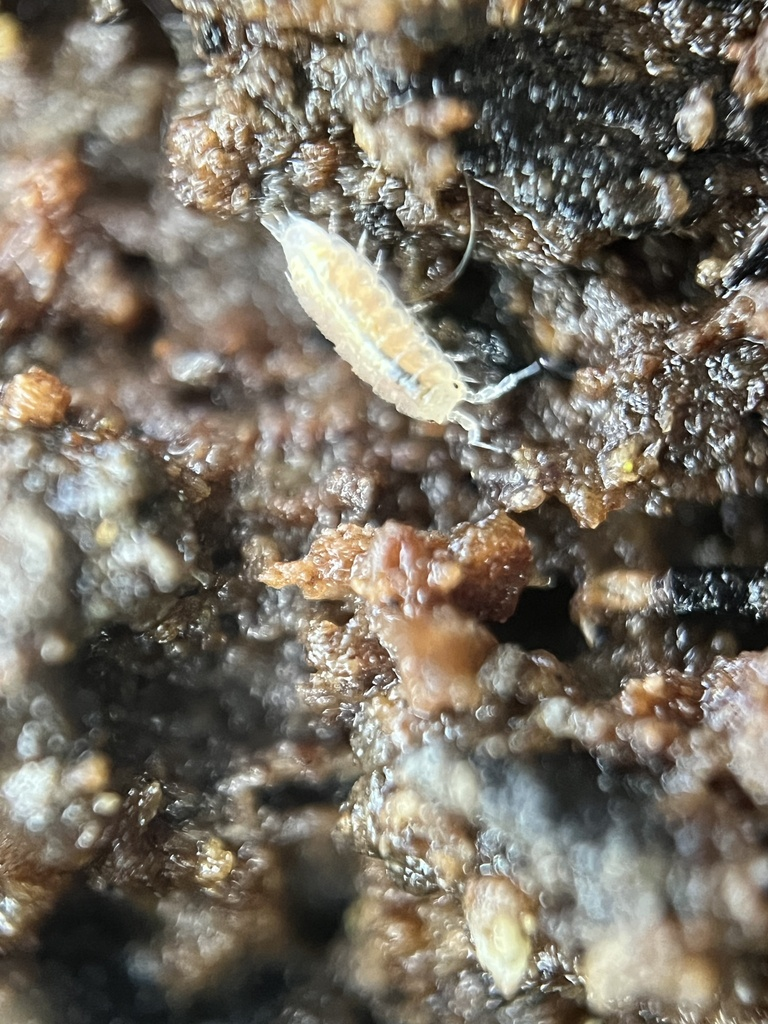

Scientific classification
- Kingdom: Animalia
- Phylum: Arthropoda
- Class: Malacostraca
- Order: Isopoda
- Suborder: Oniscidea
- Family: Trichoniscidae
- Genus: Trichoniscus
- Species: T. pygmaeus

Binomial name
- Trichoniscus pygmaeus G. O. Sars, 1898

Synonyms
- List: Trichoniscus (Spiloniscus) pygmaeus G. O. Sars, 1898; Trichoniscus pusillus var. pygmaeus G. O. Sars, 1898; Trichoniscus elbanus Verhoeff, 1931; Trichoniscus (Spiloniscus) pygmaeus var. horticola Gräve, 1913; Trichoniscus horticolus Gräve, 1913; Trichoniscus pygmaeus horticola Gräve, 1913

= Trichoniscus pygmaeus =

Species of crustacean

Trichoniscus pygmaeus is a species of pygmy woodlouse native to Britain and Ireland. It has also been seen in the US in a limited distribution area.

== Appearance ==
This species is about 2.5 mm (0.1 in) in length and is pinkish to yellowish. It has a semi transparent shell and a yellow to pinkish line down the middle.
