= Niambia capensis =

Scientific classification
- Kingdom: Animalia
- Phylum: Arthropoda
- Class: Malacostraca
- Order: Isopoda
- Suborder: Oniscidea
- Family: Platyarthridae
- Genus: Niambia
- Species: N. capensis

Binomial name
- Niambia capensis (Dollfus, 1895)

Species of crustacean

Niambia capensis is a species of woodlouse in the family Platyarthridae. It is found in Africa and North America.
