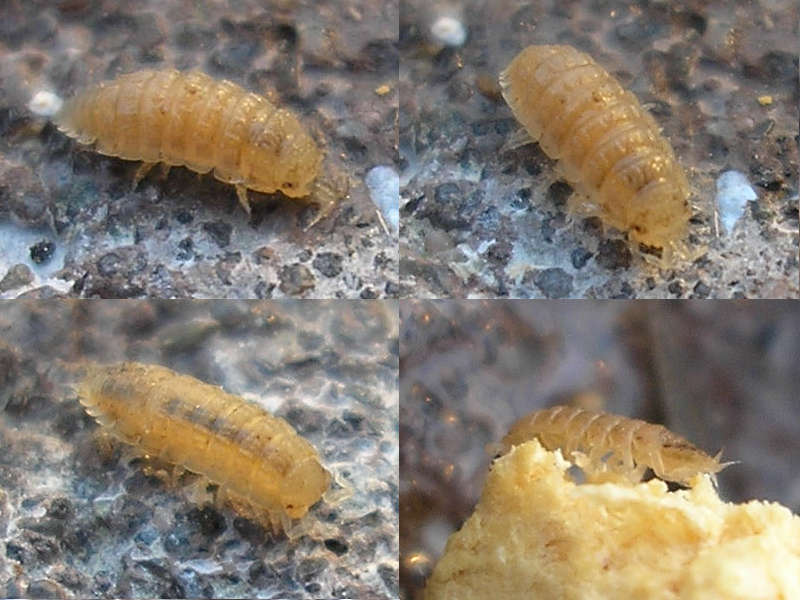
- Haplophthalmus danicus
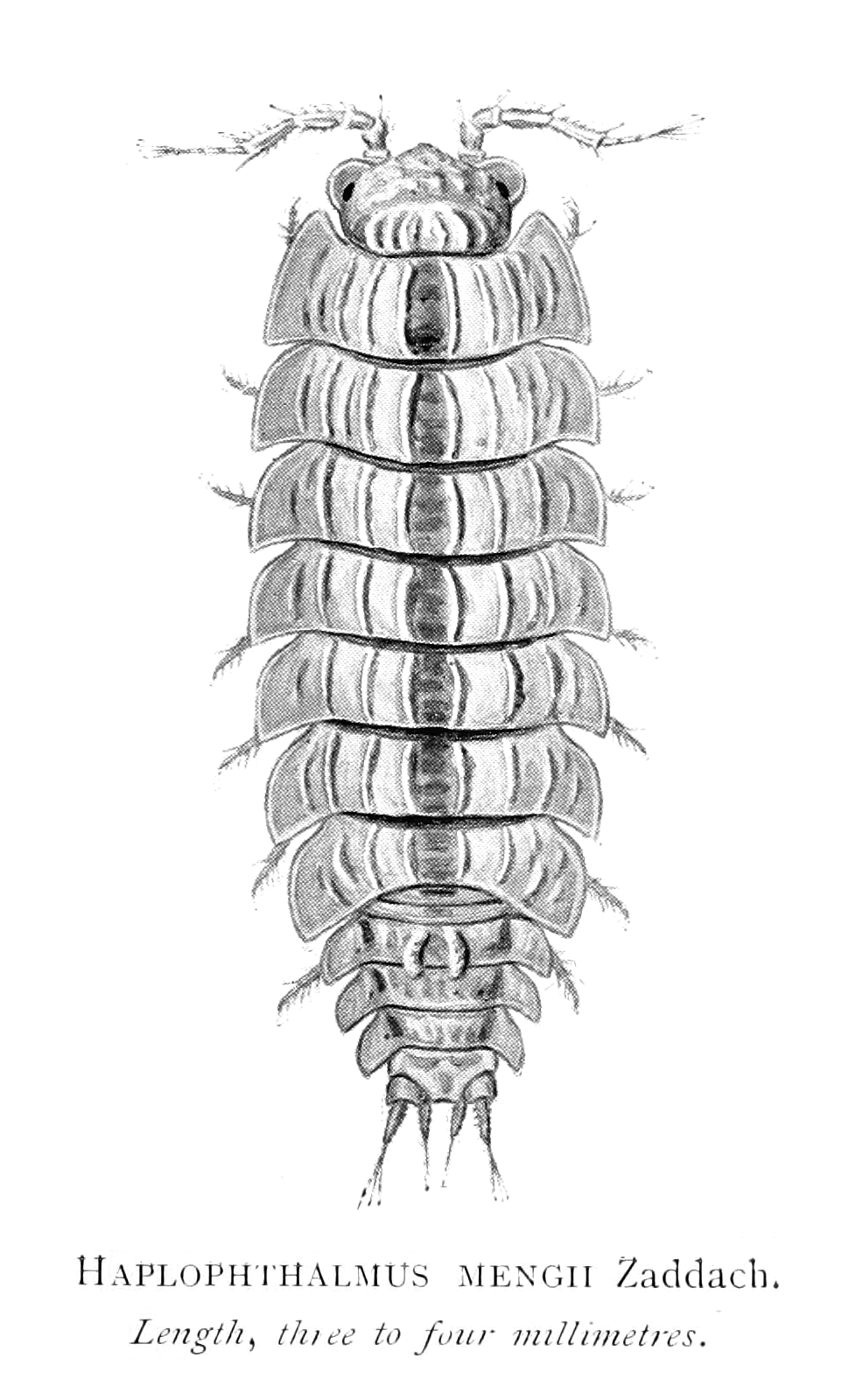
- Haplophthalmus mengii

Scientific classification
- Kingdom: Animalia
- Phylum: Arthropoda
- Clade: Pancrustacea
- Class: Malacostraca
- Order: Isopoda
- Suborder: Oniscidea
- Family: Trichoniscidae
- Genus: Haplophthalmus; Schöbl, 1860

Diversity
- 47 species

= Haplophthalmus =

Genus of woodlice

Haplophthalmus is a genus of woodlice that belongs to the family Trichoniscidae.

== Species ==
This genus currently contains 47 described species, of which two are listed as vulnerable species on the IUCN Red List – Haplophthalmus abbreviatus (endemic to Slovenia) and Haplophthalmus rhinoceros (Croatia and Slovenia).

- Haplophthalmus abbreviatus Verhoeff, 1928
- Haplophthalmus alicantinus Cruz & Dalens, 1990
- Haplophthalmus apuanus Verhoeff, 1908
- Haplophthalmus asturicus Vandel, 1952
- Haplophthalmus aternanus Verhoeff, 1931
- Haplophthalmus austriacus Verhoeff, 1940
- Haplophthalmus avolensis Vandel, 1969
- Haplophthalmus banaticus Radu, 1983
- Haplophthalmus bituberculatus Strouhal, 1963
- Haplophthalmus bodadonai Legrand & Vandel, 1950
- Haplophthalmus caecus Radu, Radu & Cadaru, 1955
- Haplophthalmus chisterai Cruz & Dalens, 1990
- Haplophthalmus claviger Verhoeff, 1944
- Haplophthalmus concordiae Verhoeff, 1952
- Haplophthalmus dalmaticus Buturović, 1955
- Haplophthalmus danicus Budde-Lund, 1879
- Haplophthalmus delmontensis Verhoeff, 1936
- Haplophthalmus fiumaranus Verhoeff, 1908
- Haplophthalmus gibbosus Verhoeff, 1930
- Haplophthalmus gibbus Legrand & Vandel, 1950
- Haplophthalmus hungaricus Kesselyak, 1930
- Haplophthalmus intermedius Frankenberger, 1941
- Haplophthalmus ionescui Radu, 1983
- Haplophthalmus kosswigi Strouhal, 1963
- Haplophthalmus ligurinus Verhoeff, 1930
- Haplophthalmus litoralis Verhoeff, 1952
- Haplophthalmus lombardicus Strouhal, 1948
- Haplophthalmus mariae Strouhal, 1953
- Haplophthalmus medius Radu, Radu & Cadaru, 1956
- Haplophthalmus mengii (Zaddach, 1844)
- Haplophthalmus meridionalis Legrand & Vandel, 1950
- Haplophthalmus monticellii Arcangeli, 1922
- Haplophthalmus montivagus Verhoeff, 1940
- Haplophthalmus movilae Gruia & Giurginca, 1998
- Haplophthalmus napocensis Radu, 1983
- Haplophthalmus orientalis Radu, Radu & Cadaru, 1956
- Haplophthalmus portofinensis Verhoeff, 1908
- Haplophthalmus provincialis Legrand & Legrand, 1950
- Haplophthalmus pumilio Verhoeff, 1944
- Haplophthalmus rhinoceros Verhoeff, 1930
- Haplophthalmus siculus Dollfus, 1896
- Haplophthalmus stygivagus Verhoeff, 1936
- Haplophthalmus teissieri Legrand, 1942
- Haplophthalmus tismanicus Tabacaru, 1970
- Haplophthalmus transiens Legrand & Vandel, 1950
- Haplophthalmus unituberculatus Vandel, 1955
- Haplophthalmus valenciae Cruz & Dalens, 1990
