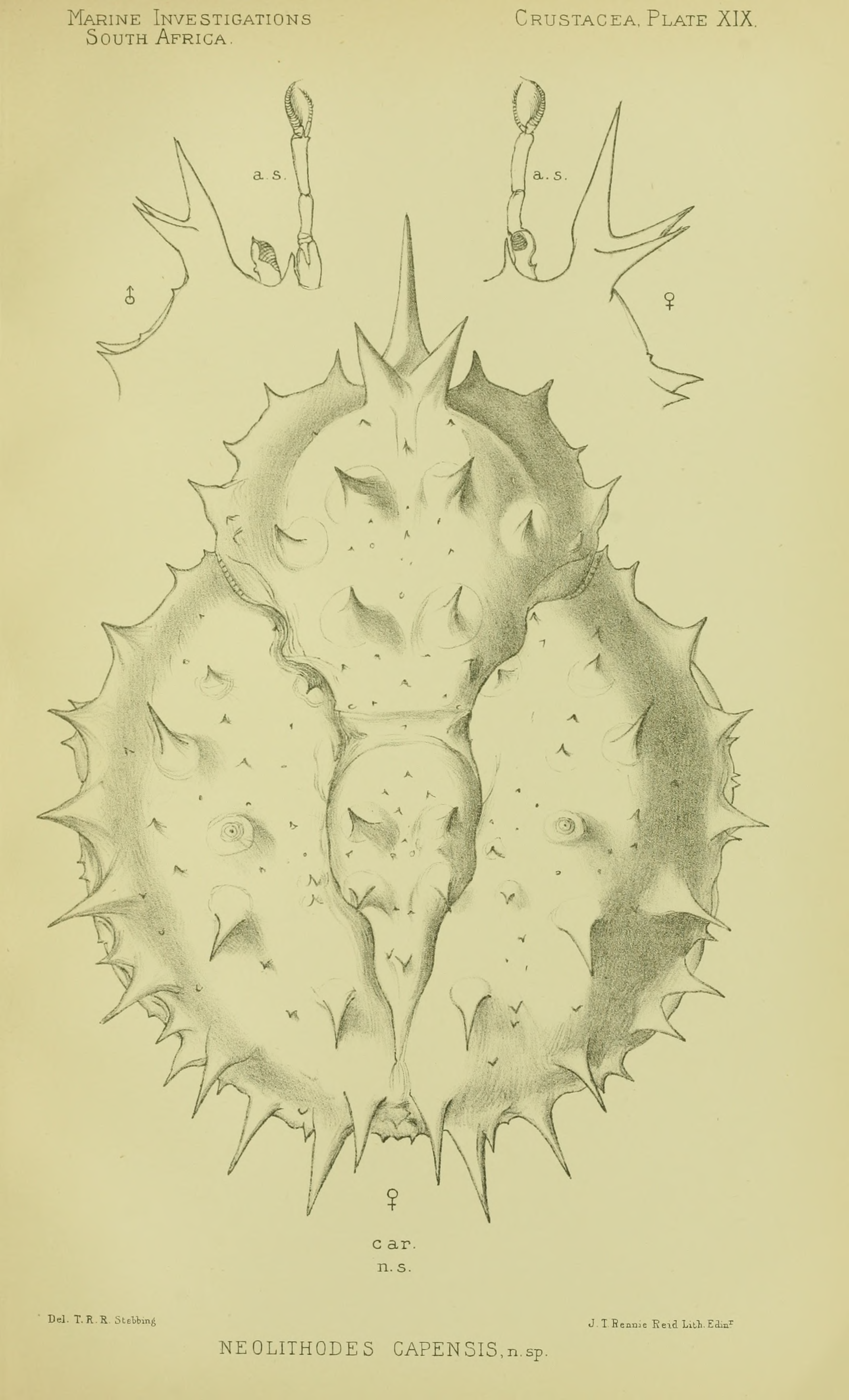

Scientific classification
- Kingdom: Animalia
- Phylum: Arthropoda
- Class: Malacostraca
- Order: Decapoda
- Suborder: Pleocyemata
- Infraorder: Anomura
- Family: Lithodidae
- Genus: Neolithodes
- Species: N. capensis

Binomial name
- Neolithodes capensis Stebbing, 1905

= Neolithodes capensis =

Species of king crab

Neolithodes capensis, also known as cape stone crab, is a species of king crab that is found in the Southern Ocean and the western Indian Ocean. It has been found to a depth of 660–3,200 metres (2,170–10,500 ft). They have been found near Cape Point, around the Crozet and Kerguelen Islands in the subantarctic, and in the Bellingshausen Sea on the Antarctic continental slope. In 2006, the description of a very similar species from the Ross Sea, N. yaldwyni, introduced the possibility that records from the Antarctic and subantarctic are not N. capensis.

== Description ==
Neolithodes capensis has numerous spines covering the surfaces of its carapace, chelipeds, and walking legs. On its underside, thick spines are found on its abdomen, but these lessen in acuity after the second segment. In males, its carapace measures up to 131 mm (5.2 in) in length and 130 mm (5.1 in) in width. Its rostrum ranges from approximately 1/8 to 1/4 the length of its carapace. Its chelae and dactyli both bear small spines, and the fingers of its chelae additionally feature rows of setae tufts. It closely resembles N. yaldwyni, a king crab of the Southern Ocean.
