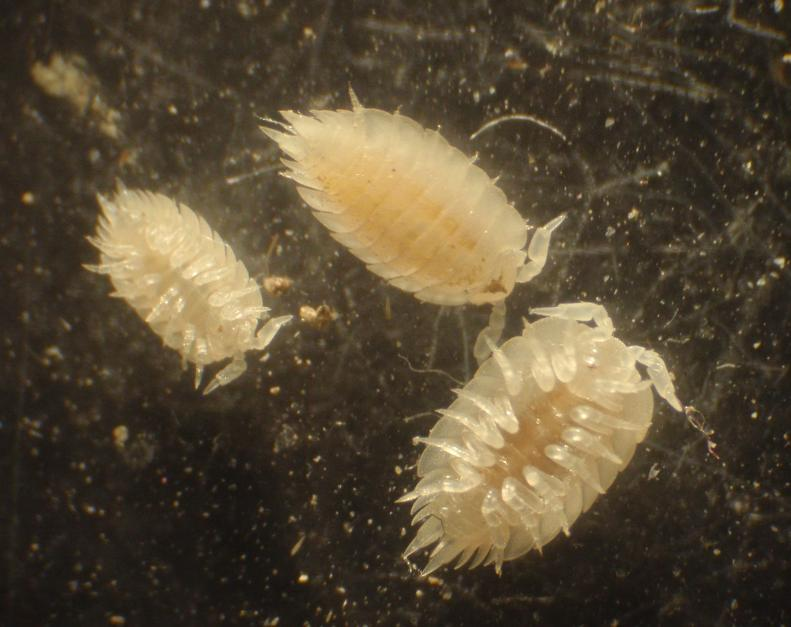
- Platyarthrus hoffmannseggii

Scientific classification
- Kingdom: Animalia
- Phylum: Arthropoda
- Class: Malacostraca
- Order: Isopoda
- Suborder: Oniscidea
- Family: Platyarthridae
- Genus: Platyarthrus; Brandt, 1833

= Platyarthrus =

Genus of crustaceans

Platyarthrus is a genus of woodlice in the family Platyarthridae. There are more than 30 described species in Platyarthrus.

== Species ==
These 39 species belong to the genus Platyarthrus:

- Platyarthrus acropyga Chopra, 1924
- Platyarthrus adonis Verhoeff, 1941
- Platyarthrus aiasensis Legrand, 1954
- Platyarthrus almanus Verhoeff, 1949
- Platyarthrus alticolus Taiti & Checcucci, 2009
- Platyarthrus armenicus Borutzky, 1976
- Platyarthrus atanassovi Verhoeff, 1936
- Platyarthrus beieri Strouhal, 1955
- Platyarthrus briani Verhoeff, 1931
- Platyarthrus caudatus Aubert & Dollfus, 1890
- Platyarthrus codinai Arcangeli, 1924
- Platyarthrus coronatus Radu, 1960
- Platyarthrus corsicus Taiti & Ferrara, 1996
- Platyarthrus costulatus Verhoeff, 1908
- Platyarthrus dalmaticus Verhoeff, 1908
- Platyarthrus dobrogicus Radu, 1951
- Platyarthrus dollfusi Verhoeff, 1901
- Platyarthrus esterelanus Verhoeff, 1931
- Platyarthrus haplophthalmoides Arcangeli, 1932
- Platyarthrus hoffmannseggii Brandt, 1833 (ant woodlouse)
- Platyarthrus inquilinus Verhoeff, 1949
- Platyarthrus kislarensis Verhoeff, 1941
- Platyarthrus kosswigii Verhoeff, 1949
- Platyarthrus lerinensis Vandel, 1957
- Platyarthrus lindbergi Vandel, 1958
- Platyarthrus luppovae Borutzky, 1953
- Platyarthrus maderensis Vandel, 1960
- Platyarthrus mesasiaticus Borutzkii, 1976
- Platyarthrus messorum Verhoeff, 1936
- Platyarthrus myrmicidarum Verhoeff, 1941
- Platyarthrus ocellatus Borutzky, 1953
- Platyarthrus parisii Arcangeli, 1931
- Platyarthrus reticulatus Radu, 1960
- Platyarthrus schoblii Budde-Lund, 1885
- Platyarthrus schoebli Budde-Lund, 1879
- Platyarthrus simoni Dollfus, 1893
- Platyarthrus sorrentinus Verhoeff, 1931
- Platyarthrus stadleri Karaman, 1961
