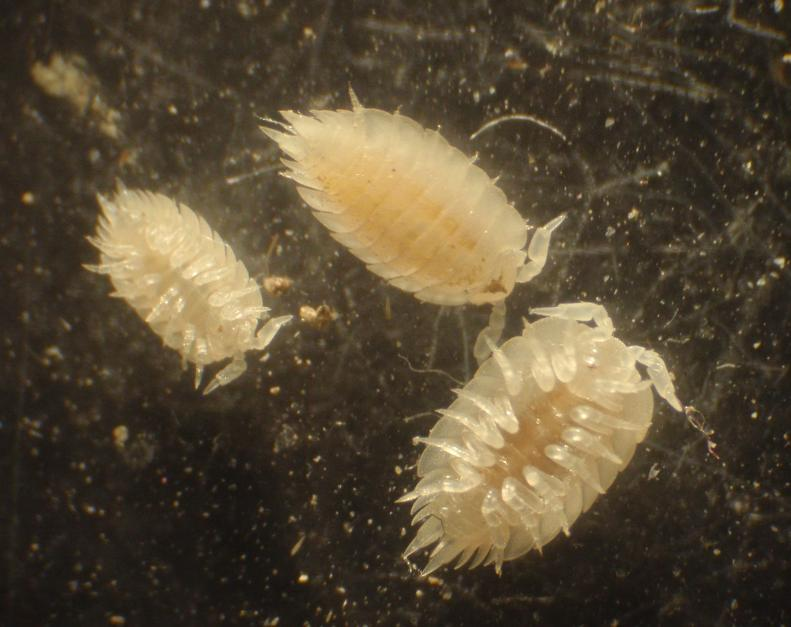
- Platyarthrus hoffmannseggii

Scientific classification
- Kingdom: Animalia
- Phylum: Arthropoda
- Clade: Pancrustacea
- Class: Malacostraca
- Order: Isopoda
- Suborder: Oniscidea
- Family: Platyarthridae; Verhoeff, 1949

= Platyarthridae =

Family of woodlice

Platyarthridae is a family of woodlice, containing the following genera:

- Cephaloniscus Ferrara & Taiti, 1989
- Echinochaetus Ferrara & Schmalfuss, 1983
- Gerufa Budde-Lund, 1909
- Lanceochaetus Schmalfuss & Ferrara, 1978
- Manibia Barnard, 1932
- Niambia Budde-Lund, 1904
- Papuasoniscus Vandel, 1973
- Platyarthrus Brandt, 1833
- Trichorhina Budde-Lund, 1908

They are mostly less than 6 millimetres (0.24 in) long, and cannot roll into a ball (conglobate). They have no lungs on the pleopods, and have very small compound eyes, with fewer than 10 ommatidia. They are similar to members of the family Trachelipodidae, which do have pleopodal lungs, although the lungs can be inconspicuous.

== See also ==
- Trichorhina mulaiki (formerly Mexicostylus)
