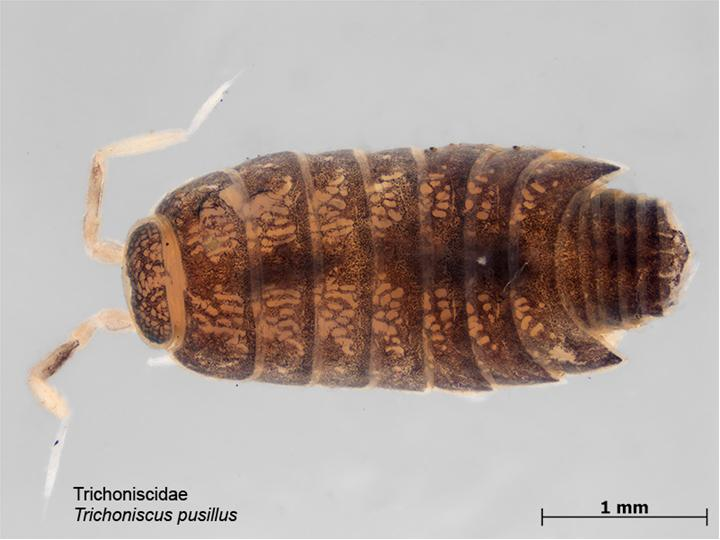
- Trichoniscus pusillus

Scientific classification
- Kingdom: Animalia
- Phylum: Arthropoda
- Clade: Pancrustacea
- Class: Malacostraca
- Order: Isopoda
- Suborder: Oniscidea
- Infraorder: Holoverticata
- Family: Trichoniscidae; G. O. Sars, 1899

Genera
- See text

Diversity
- c. 90 genera

= Trichoniscidae =

Family of woodlice

Trichoniscidae are a family of isopods (woodlice), including the most abundant British woodlouse, Trichoniscus pusillus. Many species of woodlice that have returned to an aquatic or amphibious lifestyle belong to this family. Several species from the following genera live in water and on land: Titanethes, Cyphonetes, Alpioniscus, Scotoniscus, Bureschia, Brackenridgia, Mexiconiscus, Trichoniscoides, Cretoniscellus, Balearonethes and Cyphoniscellus.

== Genera ==
The family Trichoniscidae contains the following genera, including those previously treated as the separate family Buddelundiellidae:

- Acteoniscus Vandel, 1955 – Greece
- Acyphoniscus Frankenberger, 1941 – Bulgaria
- Aegonethes Frankenberger, 1938 – islands off the shore of Croatia and Italy
- Alistratia Andreev, 2004 – Greece
- Alpioniscus Racovitza, 1908 – Europe
- Amerigoniscus Vandel, 1950 – North America
- Anatoliscus Verhoeff, 1949 – Turkey
- Androniscus Verhoeff, 1908 – Europe
- †Autrigoniscus Sánchez-García, Peñalver, Delclos & Engel, 2021 – Albian Mexico
- Balearonethes Dalens, 1977 – Majorca
- Balkanoniscus Verhoeff, 1926 – Bulgaria
- Banatoniscus Tabacaru, 1991 – Romania
- Bergamoniscus Brian & Vandel, 1949 – Italy
- Beroniscus Vandel, 1969 – Bulgaria, Sicily
- Biharoniscus Tabacaru, 1963 – Romania
- Borutzkyella Tabacaru, 1993 – Abkhazia
- Brackenphiloscia Ortiz, Debras & Lalana, 1999 – Cuba
- Brackenridgia Ulrich, 1902 – North America
- Buddelundiella Silvestri, 1897 – Mediterranean, Europe
- Bulgaronethes Vandel, 1967 – Bulgaria
- Bureschia Verhoeff, 1926 – Burma
- Calconiscellus Verhoeff, 1938 – Slovenia, Hungary, Austria, Greece
- Cantabroniscus Vandel, 1965 – Spain
- Carloniscus Verhoeff, 1936 – France, in caves
- Castellanethes Brian, 1952 – Italy: Bari
- Catalauniscus Vandel, 1953 – Spain: Tarragona
- Caucasocyphonethes Borutzky, 1948 – Russia
- Caucasonethes Verhoeff, 1932 – Georgia
- Chasmatoniscus Strouhal, 1971 – Turkey
- Cetinjella Karaman & Horvatović, 2018 – Montenegro
- Colchidoniscus Borutzky, 1974 – Western Grusia
- Cylindroniscus Arcangeli, 1929 – Cuba, Mexico
- Cyphobrembana Verhoeff, 1931 – Italy
- Cyphonethes Verhoeff, 1926 – Hercegovina
- Cyphoniscellus Verhoeff, 1901 – Italy, Southeast Europe
- Cyphopleon Frankenberger, 1940 – Dalmatia, cave
- Cyphotendana Verhoeff, 1936 – Alps
- Cyrnoniscus Vandel, 1953 – Corsica
- Escualdoniscus Séchet & Noel, 2015 – France
- Finaloniscus Brian, 1951 – Italy, Corsica
- Graeconiscus Stouhal, 1940 – Greece, Macedonia
- Haplophthalmus Schöbl, 1860 – Mediterranean, introduced to Tasmania and North America (55 species)
- Helenoniscus Legrand, 1943 – France
- Hondoniscus Vandel, 1968 – Japan
- Hyloniscus Verhoeff, 1908 – Europe, eastern North America, Japan
- Iberoniscus Vandel, 1952 – Spain
- Katascaphius Verhoeff, 1936 – Alps
- Kosswigius Verhoeff, 1941 – Turkey, Greece
- Lapilloniscus Brian, 1938 – Italy
- Leucocyphoniscus Verhoeff, 1900 – Switzerland, Italy
- Libanonethes Vandel, 1955 – Libanon
- Macedonethes Buturović, 1955 – Macedonia
- Metatrichoniscoides Vandel, 1943 – southern England, France, Germany, Sweden, Finland
- Mexiconiscus Schultz, 1964 – Mexico
- Microtitanethes Pljakic, 1977 – West Serbia
- Miktoniscus Kesselyak, 1930 – United States, Great Britain, Madeira, Azores
- Mingrelloniscus Borutzky, 1974 – Caucasus
- Mladenoniscus Karaman, 2008 - Macedonia
- Monocyphoniscus Strouhal, 1939 – Bulgaria
- Moserius Strouhal, 1940 – near Trieste, Italy
- Murgeoniscus Arcangeli, 1939 – Italy
- Nesiotoniscus Racovitza, 1908 – southern France, Corsica, Capraia Island
- Nippononethes Tabacaru, 1996 – Japan
- Oregoniscus Hatch, 1947 – United States: Oregon
- Oritoniscus Racovitza, 1908 – Pyrenees
- Paracyphoniscus Brian, 1958 – Italy
- Phymatoniscus Racovitza, 1908 – France (4 species)
- Protonethes Absolon & Strouhal, 1932 – Yugoslavia
- Psachonethes Borutzky, 1969 – Southwest Caucasus, north Iran (2 species)
- Pseudobuddelundiella Borutzky, 1967 – Northern Caucasus
- Rhodopioniscus Tabacaru, 1993 – Bulgaria (3 species)
- Sanfilippia Brian, 1949 – Italy
- Scotoniscus Racovitza, 1908 – Pyrenees, Sardinia (3 species)
- Siciloniscus Caruso, 1982 – Sicily
- Spelaeonethes Verhoeff, 1932 – Spain, Italy, Sicily, Sardinia, Algeria (5 species)
- Strouhaloniscellus Tabacaru, 1993 – south Bosnia
- Tachysoniscus Verhoeff, 1930 – southeastern Alps
- Tauronethes Borutzky, 1949 – Krimea
- Thaumatoniscellus Tabacaru, 1973 – Romania
- Titanethes Schiødte, 1849 – Italy, Slovenia, Croatia, Hercegovina (3 species)
- Trichonethes Strouhal, 1953 – Turkey (2 species)
- Trichoniscoides Sars, 1898 – France, Spain, England, Germany, Denmark (40 species)
- Trichoniscus Brandt, 1833 – Europe, North America (185 species)
- Tricyphoniscus Verhoeff, 1936 – Bulgaria
- Troglocyphoniscus Stouhal, 1939 – Yugoslavia (2 species)
- Troglonethes Cruz, 1991 – Spain
- Turkonethes Verhoeff, 1943 – Turkey (2 species)
- Typhlotricholigioides Rioja, 1953 – Mexico
- Vandeloniscellus Tabacaru, 1993 – Bulgaria
