= Tridentodillo =

Scientific classification
- Kingdom: Animalia
- Phylum: Arthropoda
- Clade: Pancrustacea
- Class: Malacostraca
- Order: Isopoda
- Suborder: Oniscidea
- Family: Armadillidae
- Genus: Tridentodillo; Jackson, 1933
- Species: T. squamosus

Binomial name
- Tridentodillo squamosus Jackson, 1933

Genus of woodlice

Tridentodillo is a genus of woodlice belonging to the family Armadillidae. This genus was described in 1933 by Harold Gordon Jackson. The type specimen for this species is Tridentodillo squamosus from the Marquesas Islands in French Polynesia, and it is the only species in this genus.

== Taxonomy ==
The genus was published within the Pacific Entomological Survey, a Bishop Museum project formed in 1927 through a five-year cooperative agreement between the museum, the Hawaiian Sugar Planters' Association and the Association of Hawaiian Pineapple Canners. Jackson's account of the Marquesan woodlice appeared in volume 114 of the Bishop Museum Bulletin, which formed part of the survey's "Marquesan Insects" series. That series was planned to bring together taxonomic papers by specialists on insects and on other terrestrial and freshwater arthropods.

== Description ==
In the genus Tridentodillo, the edge of the frontal lamina (head shield) is layered and strongly raised above the thorax, forming a broad triangular shape in the middle. The epimera (side plate) of the first pereon segment is thin and unbroken. On the underside of this segment, set in from the side edge, there is a long, deep fold that runs along the length of the segment and ends at the rear in a prominent, semicircular flap. The movable flap on the second pereon segment is tooth-shaped and extends well beyond the rear edge of the segment. The front and rear corners of the first three epimera are reduced, giving them a sharp outer edge. The remaining exposed segments have roughly square outlines and do not extend outward. The head and each pereonal segment have three very long, slender, curved spines along their rear edges, while the abdominal segments lack spines entirely.

Tridentodillo is one of several specialized, spiny genera of old world Armadillidae, alongside Calmanesia, Echinodillo, Laureola and Pseudolaureola. Taxonomists have compared these genera with Acanthoniscus, a Jamaican genus that closely resembles them.

== Distribution ==
Tridentodillo isopods have only been found on isolated islands in the Marquesas Islands of French Polynesia.
