= Kimberleydillo =

Scientific classification
- Kingdom: Animalia
- Phylum: Arthropoda
- Clade: Pancrustacea
- Class: Malacostraca
- Order: Isopoda
- Suborder: Oniscidea
- Family: Armadillidae
- Genus: Kimberleydillo; Dalens, 1993
- Species: K. waldockae

Binomial name
- Kimberleydillo waldockae Dalens, 1993

Genus of woodlice

Kimberleydillo is a genus of woodlice belonging to the family Armadillidae. This genus was described in 1993 by Henri Dalens. The type specimen for this species is a Kimberleydillo waldockae from Tunnel Creek cave in Western Australia and it is the only species in this genus.

== Description ==
Kimberleydillo isopods have a flattened body with no ventral lobes. They are not able to conglobate.. The flagellum of their antennae are two-jointed. They have five pairs of pseudotracheae. Their uropod protopodite is flattened and situated between the sides of their telson and epimera of pleon segment 5. Their telson has a trapezoidal proximal part and a subrectangular distal part.

They have black eyes made up of 13 to 16 ommatidia.

Kimberleydillo are visually similar to Australiodillo and Neodillo but are differentiated by their dorsal surface being regularly curved, while the margins are more or less extended horizontally in Australiodillo and Neodillo.

== Distribution ==
Kimberleydillo have only been found in Western Australia. They are known only from the dark zone of a cave.

== Etymology ==
This species is named after the type locality, Kimberley (Western Australia) plus the common isopod suffix "-dillo".

== Species ==
- Kimberleydillo waldockae Dalens,1993
