= Spherillo =

- Spherillo rufomarginatus photographed in Whakarewarewa forest, New Zealand.

Scientific classification
- Kingdom: Animalia
- Phylum: Arthropoda
- Clade: Pancrustacea
- Class: Malacostraca
- Order: Isopoda
- Suborder: Oniscidea
- Family: Armadillidae
- Genus: Spherillo; Dana, 1853

Synonyms
- Melanestillo Verhoeff, 1938; Sphaerillo Dana, 1853; Sphaerilloides Vandel, 1974

Genus of crustaceans

Spherillo is a genus of woodlice belonging to the family Armadillidae. This genus was first described in 1853 by James Dwight Dana. The type specimen for this species is a Spherillo vitiensis from Viti Levu. There are currently 65 accepted species in this genus.

== Description ==
Spherillo sp. have epimera segments that interlock when they conglobate. On their head, they have a frontal lamina (head shield) that either does not protrude past the end of the head or protrudes only slightly. They also have covered lungs with a single spiracle similar to other Armadillidae genera like Cubaris, Dryadillo, and Venezillo.

Spherillo are visually similar to the genus Formosillo with which they were once combined.

== Distribution ==
Spherillo sp. have been found in Asia including in China, Japan, and Vietnam. They have also been found in Oceania including in Australia and Fiji.

== Pet trade ==
Like many other Armadillidae, some species of Spherillo are common in the pet trade. However, many species being sold as Spherillo sp. are actually misidentified members of other genera like Cubaris.

== Species ==
There are currently 65 accepted species of Spherillo:

- Spherillo albospinosus (Dollfus, 1900)
- Spherillo aucklandicus (Budde-Lund, 1885)
- Spherillo bipunctatus Budde-Lund, 1904
- Spherillo bocki (Verhoeff, 1938)
- Spherillo boholensis Budde-Lund, 1904
- Spherillo brachycephalus Budde-Lund, 1904
- Spherillo brevis Budde-Lund, 1904
- Spherillo caligans Budde-Lund, 1904
- Spherillo carinulatus Budde-Lund, 1904
- Spherillo coecus (Dollfus, 1898)
- Spherillo collaris Budde-Lund, 1904
- Spherillo damarensis (Panning, 1924)
- Spherillo danae Heller, 1865
- Spherillo decoratus Budde-Lund, 1904
- Spherillo dispersus Budde-Lund, 1904
- Spherillo erinaceus (Budde-Lund, 1885)
- Spherillo fissus Verhoeff, 1926
- Spherillo floresianus (Dollfus, 1898)
- Spherillo graevei (Arcangeli, 1927)
- Spherillo grisescens Budde-Lund in Lanchester, 1902
- Spherillo grossus (Budde-Lund, 1885)
- Spherillo hailuogouensis Li, 2018
- Spherillo hawaiensis Dana, 1853
- Spherillo hypotoreus Jackson, 1936
- Spherillo ingens Budde-Lund, 1904
- Spherillo insularum Verhoeff, 1942
- Spherillo ishidai Nunomura, 2011
- Spherillo maculosus Budde-Lund, 1904
- Spherillo marginatus Budde-Lund, 1904
- Spherillo marquesarum Jackson, 1933
- Spherillo melanurus (Dollfus, 1887)
- Spherillo menglunensis Dai & Cai, 1998
- Spherillo misellus (Budde-Lund, 1885)
- Spherillo monolinus Dana, 1853
- Spherillo montivagus Verhoeff, 1942
- Spherillo nanjingensis Tang, Gui & Wu, 1994
- Spherillo nicobaricus (Budde-Lund, 1885)
- Spherillo nipponicus Arcangeli, 1952
- Spherillo nobilis Budde-Lund, 1904
- Spherillo nomurai Nunomura & Xie, 2000
- Spherillo obliquipes Budde-Lund, 1904
- Spherillo opacus Verhoeff, 1928
- Spherillo orientalis Kwon & Taiti, 1993
- Spherillo panningi Arcangeli, 1934
- Spherillo pictus Heller, 1865
- Spherillo pomarius Jackson, 1930
- Spherillo punctatus Nunomura, 2007
- Spherillo purpurascens Budde-Lund, 1912
- Spherillo pygmaeus Verhoeff, 1926
- Spherillo raffaelei (Arcangeli, 1927)
- Spherillo ruficornis (Budde-Lund, 1885)
- Spherillo rufomarginatus Budde-Lund, 1904
- Spherillo russoi (Arcangeli, 1927)
- Spherillo sarasinorum (Dollfus, 1898)
- Spherillo sennai (Arcangeli, 1927)
- Spherillo setaceus Budde-Lund, 1904
- Spherillo societatis Maccagno, 1932
- Spherillo sollers Budde-Lund, 1904
- Spherillo speciosus (Dana, 1853)
- Spherillo spicatus Jackson, 1927
- Spherillo squamatus Budde-Lund, 1904
- Spherillo telsogrossus Wahrberg, 1922
- Spherillo tsukamotoi Nunomura, 2005
- Spherillo ufuagarijimensis Nunomura, 2009
- Spherillo vitiensis Dana, 1853
- Spherillo weberi (Dollfus, 1898)
