= Sphenodillo =

Scientific classification
- Kingdom: Animalia
- Phylum: Arthropoda
- Clade: Pancrustacea
- Class: Malacostraca
- Order: Isopoda
- Suborder: Oniscidea
- Family: Armadillidae
- Genus: Sphenodillo; Lewis, 1998

Type species
- Sphenodillo agnostos Lewis, 1998

Genus of woodlice

Sphenodillo is a genus of woodlice belonging to the family Armadillidae. This genus was described in 1998 by Fiona Lewis. The type specimen for this species is S. agnostos from Lord Howe Island. There is currently one accepted species in this genus.

== Description ==
Sphenodillo are dark in colour with cream blotches along their sides slightly above their epimera (side plates). They have short antennae. Their eyes have 17-18 ocelli. Their frontal lamina (face shield) has rounded rectangular lateral angles. They have endolobes (small, ventral lobe-like structures on the underside of the epimera) on the epimera of their first and second segments.They have a triangular shaped section of raised bumps on their first tergite. All of their tergites have a line of raised bumps across the whole width. The epimera of the second to fourth pereon segments are rounded rectangular; the epimera of the fifth to seventh are rectangular and extend slightly backward. Their telson is hourglass shaped with a raised wedge-like keel.

=== Remarks on similar genera ===
Although Emydodillo spp. have a similar keeled telson, they have a much slighter structure than that defining Sphenodillo. Emydodillo spp. have a high frontal lamina, lobes on their first to third epimera, and antennae with excentrically inserted flagellum. These characteristics separate it from Sphenodillo.

== Distribution ==
Sphenodillo isopods are endemic to Lord Howe Island and have only been found in small numbers.

== Etymology ==
The gender of the generic name is masculine. This genus is named to describe the diagnostic telson of this genera. The name derives from the Greek "sphenos" meaning wedge, plus "-dillo", a commonly used suffix in the family Armadillidae.

== Species ==
- Sphenodillo agnostos Lewis, 1998

=== Unaccepted species ===
- Sphenodillo howensis Lewis, 1998 - this species was mentioned by Lewis in the 1988 publication in a short remark but it is considered a nomen nudum and it is believed that both species names referred to the same specimens.
