= Annobodillo =

Scientific classification
- Kingdom: Animalia
- Phylum: Arthropoda
- Class: Malacostraca
- Order: Isopoda
- Suborder: Oniscidea
- Family: Armadillidae
- Genus: Annobodillo
- Species: A. coecus

Binomial name
- Annobodillo coecus Schmalfuss & Ferrara, 1983

Genus of woodlice

Annobodillo is a genus of woodlice belonging to the family Armadillidae. This genus was described in 1983 by Helmut Schmalfuss and Franco Ferrara. The type specimen for this species is an Annobodillo coecus from Annobón. There is currently only one species in this genus.

== Description ==
The body of this genus is pigmentless and they have no traceable ocelli. They are able to fully conglobate. They have vertical epimera. Their frontal lamina protrude slightly past the end of their head. Their first pereonal segment is thickened laterally and grooved along its length. Their second pereonal segment has triangular epimeron and small tooth on the ventral surface. their third pereonal has a very slight transverse ventral thickening. Their telson are hour-glass-shaped with a short distal part. Their uropod protopodite is distally rectangular. They have exopodites.

=== Remarks on similar genera ===
The genus Annobodillo is similar to Tuberillo, from which it differs in the steep epimera, very low frontal lamina and absence of ornamentation. This genus is also similar to Venezillo, from which it differs in the shape of its first and second pereon segments and its ability to fully conglobate.

== Distribution ==
This genus is endemic to the island of Annobón in Equatorial Guinea.

== Etymology ==
The name of the genus Annobodillo refers to the island Annobón plus the common isoopod suffix "-dillo".

== Species ==
- Annobodillo coecus Schmalfuss & Ferrara, 1983
