= Paraxenodillo =

Scientific classification
- Kingdom: Animalia
- Phylum: Arthropoda
- Clade: Pancrustacea
- Class: Malacostraca
- Order: Isopoda
- Suborder: Oniscidea
- Family: Armadillidae
- Genus: Paraxenodillo
- Species: P. singularis

Binomial name
- Paraxenodillo singularis Schmalfuss & Ferrara, 1983

Genus of woodlice

Paraxenodillo is a genus of woodlice belonging to the family Armadillidae. This genus were described in 1983 by Helmut Schmalfuss and Franco Ferrara. There is only one species in this genus.

== Description ==
Paraxenodillo are able to conglobate. They have steep epimera. Their dorsal sides do not havespines or bumps. Their cephalon has a frontal lamina that protrudes past the end of the head. Their first and second pereon segments have interlocking structures. On their first pereon segment the lateral margin is a little thickened. The second pereon segment has a ventral, rectangular, oblique tooth. The anterior margin of their epimeron are directed obliquely forwards, and they adhere perfectly with the posterior margin of the first segment when they are conglobated. Their telson is hourglass-shaped with the basal and distal parts being subequal. Their uropodprotopodite has a rectangular distal part. They have exopodites but they are minute.

=== Remarks on similar species ===
Paraxenodillo is visually similar to the genera Venezillo and Tuberillo.

== Distribution ==
This genus has only been found on the island of Annobón in Equatorial Guinea.

== Species ==
- Paraxenodillo singularis Schmalfuss & Ferrara, 1983
