= Mesodillo =

Scientific classification
- Kingdom: Animalia
- Phylum: Arthropoda
- Clade: Pancrustacea
- Class: Malacostraca
- Order: Isopoda
- Suborder: Oniscidea
- Family: Armadillidae
- Genus: Mesodillo; Verhoeff, 1926
- Species: M. eremitus

Binomial name
- Mesodillo eremitus Verhoeff, 1926

Genus of woodlice

Mesodillo is a genus of woodlice belonging to the family Armadillidae. This genus was described in 1926 by Karl Wilhelm Verhoeff. The type specimen for this species is a Mesodillo eremitus from a forest near Yaté, New Caledonia and it is the only species in this genus.

== Description ==
The genus Mesodillo is visually similar to another Armadillid genus, Orodillo. Unlike in Orodillo sp., Mesodillo do not have a bump under the posterior corner of their first epimera (side plates).

The tergites of this genus lack an arched groove at the anterior end. Their tergites do not have any bristles, and instead are smooth and shiny. Their uropod exopodites are inserted unusually far forwards and outwards, closer to the outer margin than to the inner margin.

== Distribution ==
This genus has only been described from New Caledonia.

== Species ==
There is currently only one species in this genus:

- Mesodillo eremitus Verhoeff, 1926
