= Myrmecodillo =

Scientific classification
- Kingdom: Animalia
- Phylum: Arthropoda
- Class: Malacostraca
- Order: Isopoda
- Suborder: Oniscidea
- Family: Armadillidae
- Genus: Myrmecodillo; Arcangeli, 1934

Genus of woodlice

Myrmecodillo is a genus of woodlice belonging to the family Armadillidae. This genus was described in 1934 by Alceste Arcangeli. The type specimen for this species is a Myrmecodillo hypselos from Krantzkloof. There are currently seven species in this genus.

== Description ==
Myrmecodillo sp. have uncovered pleopodal lungs where the surface of the lung, on the dorsal side of the exopod, consists of many tubuliform folds connected with one another. This is unusual in Armadillidae but is present in some other genera including Sinodillo and Rhodesillo.

All species have ornamentation on their dorsal surface.

== Distribution ==
This genus has been found on a number of islands including the Bismarck Archipelago, Hawaii, Madagascar, Mauritius, Réunion, Sulawesi, and Tonga as well as in mainland Africa in Natal, South Africa.

== Behaviour ==
Myrmecodillo are typically soil-dwelling, with reduced eyes and pigment. Like several other genera in the family Armadillidae, some species have associations with ants.

== Species ==
- Myrmecodillo hypselos (Barnard, 1932)
- Myrmecodillo jacksoni (Dalens, 1988)
- Myrmecodillo otion (Barnard, 1958)
- Myrmecodillo pacificus Taiti & Ferrara, 1991
- Myrmecodillo pollex (Barnard, 1936)
- Myrmecodillo pygmaeus (Vandel, 1973)
- Myrmecodillo tropicalis Lewis, 1998
