= Cuckoldillo =

Scientific classification
- Kingdom: Animalia
- Phylum: Arthropoda
- Clade: Pancrustacea
- Class: Malacostraca
- Order: Isopoda
- Suborder: Oniscidea
- Family: Armadillidae
- Genus: Cuckoldillo; Lewis, 1998
- Species: C. episcopalis

Binomial name
- Cuckoldillo episcopalis Lewis, 1998

Genus of woodlice

Cuckoldillo is a genus of woodlice belonging to the family Armadillidae. This genus was described in 1998 by Fiona Lewis. The type specimen for this species is a Cuckoldillo episcopalis from Cape Tribulation, Queensland, and it is the only species in this genus.

== Description ==
Cuckoldillo isopods are small with a nearly spherical body shape and vertically oriented epimera (lateral body plates). Their dorsal surface is covered with triangular and oval scales.

Adult males are distinctive in having a frontal lamina (head shield) on the cephalon that projects forward into two long, finger-like horns positioned in front of the eyes. In contrast, females and immature males have a low frontal lamina that is smoothly curved across the top of the head and lacks prominent projections. All individuals possess two small tubercles near the rear margin of the head, which are larger and more pointed in mature males. The eyes consist of approximately 14–16 ommatidia.

The first epimeron has a cleft lateral margin forming a blunt, triangular ventral lobe that extends to or slightly beyond the posterior margin. On the second epimeron, the lobe is reduced to a blunt tooth near the front edge. Low, ridge-like tubercles are present on all pereon (thoracic) segments. The anterior and posterior angles of the first epimeron are pointed, epimera two to four are bluntly rounded, and epimera five to seven are roughly rectangular. The posterior margins of the epimera are straight or slightly concave on the first four segments.

The pleon lacks tubercles and shows a shallow median groove along the tergites. The telson is wider than long, narrowed at the middle and slightly expanded posteriorly, with a blunt tip and rounded lateral angles. The uropods are very small, with the exopods reduced and inserted into a notch of the protopod near the constricted region of the telson.

== Distribution ==
Cuckoldillo isopods have only been found in Northern Queensland, Australia.

== Species ==
- Cuckoldillo episcopalis Lewis, 1998

== Etymology ==
Cuckoldillo is named after the two cephalic horns present in adult males, compared to a cuckold's horns. The specific epithet episcopalis refers to its collector, L. Bishop.
