= Pseudolobodillo =

Scientific classification
- Kingdom: Animalia
- Phylum: Arthropoda
- Clade: Pancrustacea
- Class: Malacostraca
- Order: Isopoda
- Suborder: Oniscidea
- Family: Armadillidae
- Genus: Pseudolobodillo
- Species: P. principensis

Binomial name
- Pseudolobodillo principensis Schmalfuss & Ferrara, 1983

Species of woodlouse

Pseudolobodillo is a genus of woodlice belonging to the family Armadillidae. The genus and the species were described in 1983 by Helmut Schmalfuss and Franco Ferrara.

== Description ==
Pseudolobodillo are able to fully conglobate. This genus has no spines or bumps on their dorsal side. They have steep epimera (side plates). Their frontal lamina is folded over the end of their head. They have interlocking structures on all of their pereon segments and on their third and fourth pleon segments. Their first pereon segment has a triangular ventral tooth and no schisma. Their second pereon segment has a large ventral lobe. Their third and fourth pereon segments have transverse triangular thickenings. Their fifth to seventh pereon segments and third and fourth pleon segments have large ventral lobes. Their telson is hourglass shaped with the distal part shorter and narrower than the basal part. Their uropod exopodite is reduced.

== Distribution ==
The only known species in the genus, Pseudolobodillo principensis, is endemic to the island of Príncipe in São Tomé and Príncipe.

== Species ==
- Pseudolobodillo principensis Schmalfuss & Ferrara, 1983
