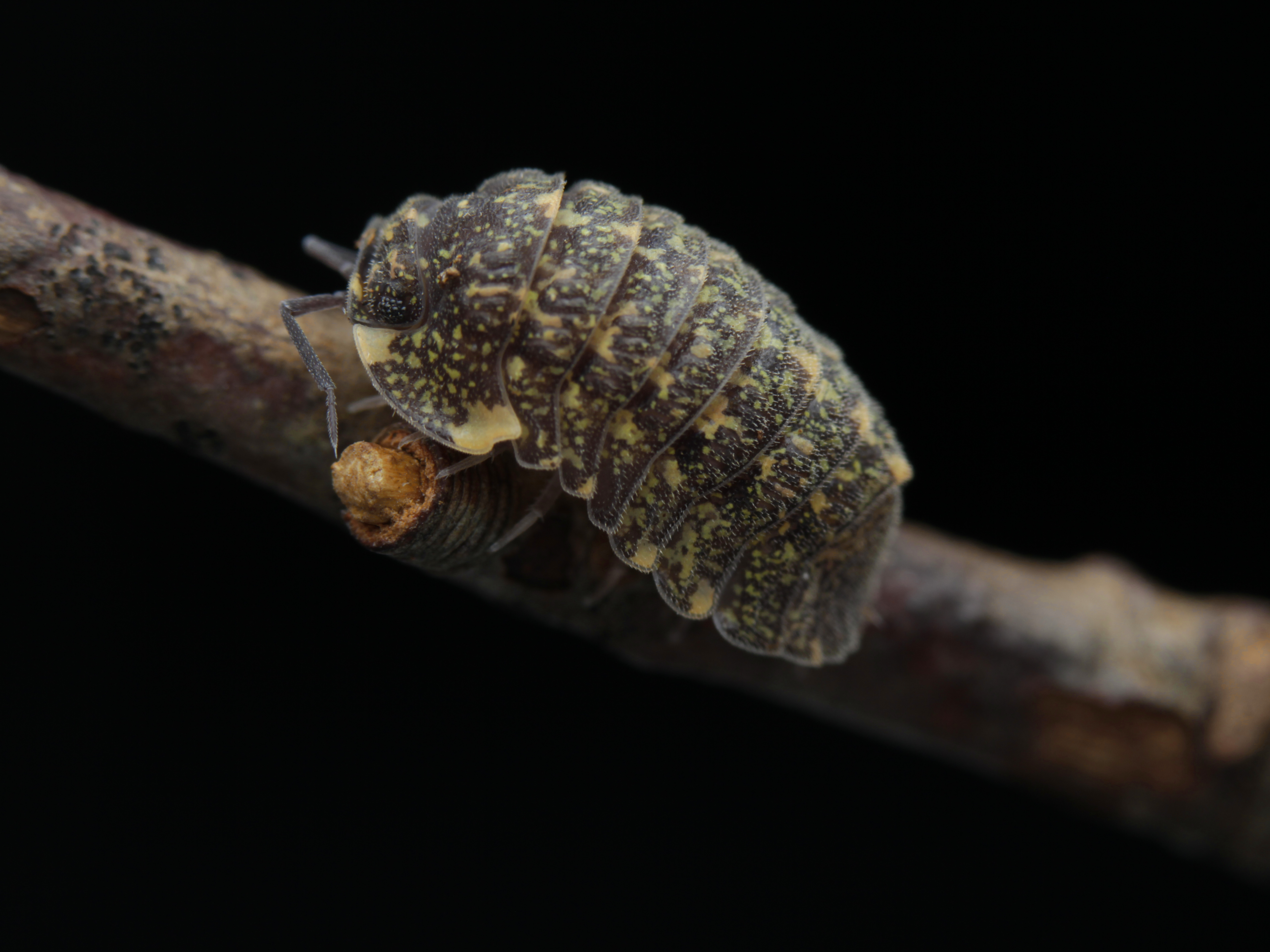
- Barnardillo barnardi

Scientific classification
- Kingdom: Animalia
- Phylum: Arthropoda
- Class: Malacostraca
- Order: Isopoda
- Suborder: Oniscidea
- Family: Armadillidae
- Genus: Barnardillo; Taiti, Paoli & Ferrara, 1998

Type species
- Armadillo mucidus Budde-Lund, 1885

= Barnardillo =

Genus of woodlice

Barnardillo is a genus of woodlice belonging to the family Armadillidae. In 1934 Alceste Arcangeli instituted the genus Barnardillo for the species Armadillo mucidus (Budde-Lund, 1885) and others but he did not designate a type specimen. In 1998 Stefano Taiti, Pasquino Paoli, and Franco Ferrera subsequently validated this genus by naming Armadillo mucidus (Budde-Lund, 1885) the type specimen. This type specimen was collected at Cape of Good Hope in South Africa. There are currently five species in this genus.

== Description ==
Barnardillo have long and thin penicils (dentate setae on mandibles). Their frontal lamina (head shield) protrudes past the end of the head.

== Distribution ==
This genus has been found in Malawi, Mozambique, South Africa, and Zimbabwe. Some members of this genus can be found up to 2350m in elevation.

== Species ==
- Barnardillo barnardi (Collinge, 1920)
- Barnardillo montanus Taiti & Ferrara, 1987
- Barnardillo mucidus (Budde-Lund, 1885)
- Barnardillo secutor (Jackson, 1924)
- Barnardillo warreni (Collinge, 1917)

== Etymology ==
The name of this genus is an homage to the prominent South African zoologist Keppel Harcourt Barnard.
