= Filippinodillo =

Scientific classification
- Kingdom: Animalia
- Phylum: Arthropoda
- Class: Malacostraca
- Order: Isopoda
- Suborder: Oniscidea
- Family: Armadillidae
- Genus: Filippinodillo; Schmalfuss, 1987

Type species
- Filippinodillo maculatus Schmalfuss, 1987

Genus of woodlice

Filippinodillo is a genus of woodlice belonging to the family Armadillidae. This genus was described in 1987 by Helmut Schmalfuss. The type specimen for this species is a Filippinodillo maculatus from Cebu island. There are currently four species in this genus.

== Distribution ==
This genus has been found in Australia and in the Philippines on multiple islands including Cebu island, Mindanao Island, and Palawan.

== Species ==
- Filippinodillo flavimaculis Jeon & Kwon, 2001
- Filippinodillo kimberleyensis Lewis, 1998
- Filippinodillo maculatus Schmalfuss, 1987
- Filippinodillo palawanensis Jeon & Kwon, 2001
