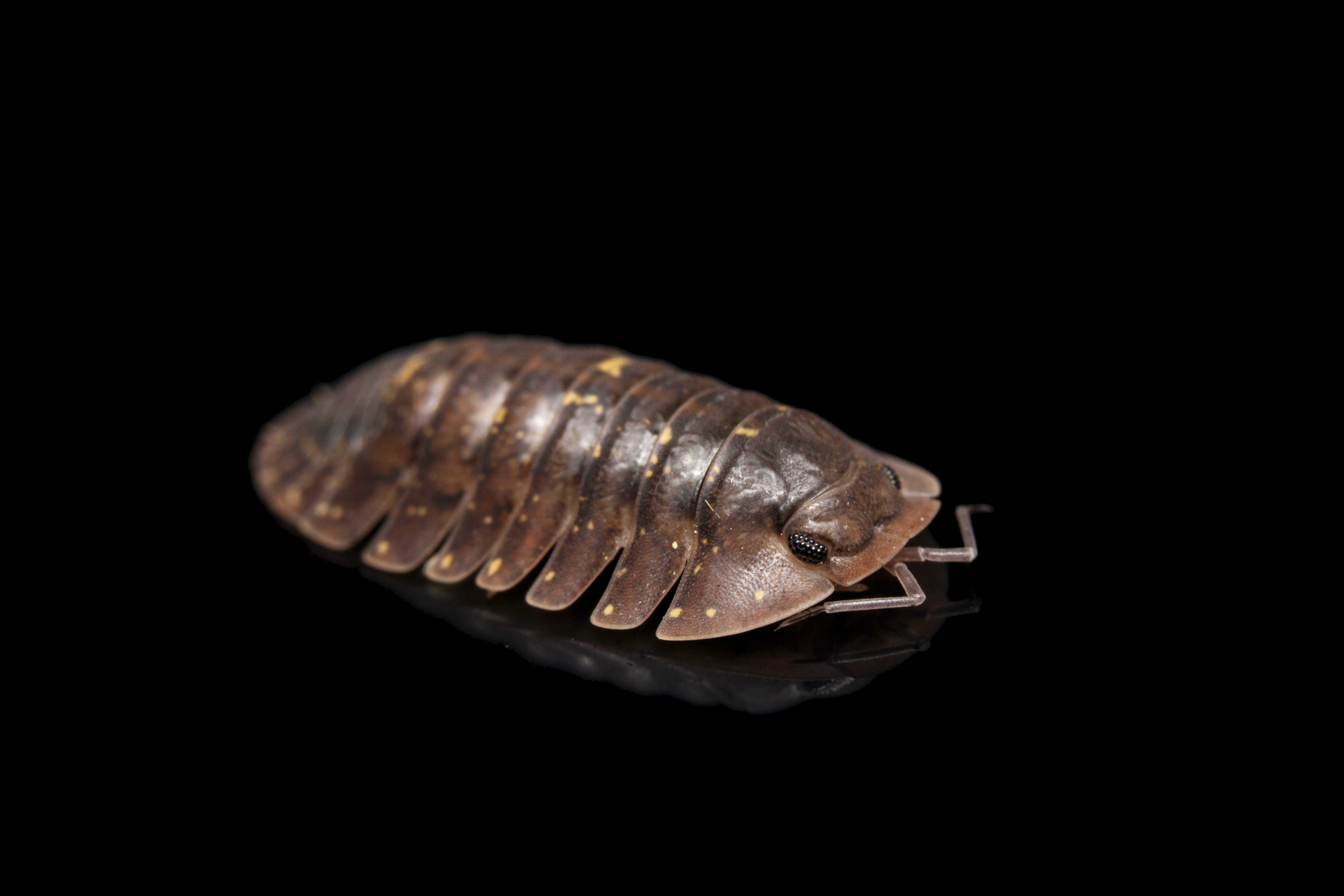
- Merulana translucida

Scientific classification
- Kingdom: Animalia
- Phylum: Arthropoda
- Class: Malacostraca
- Order: Isopoda
- Suborder: Oniscidea
- Family: Armadillidae
- Genus: Merulana; Budde-Lund, 1913

= Merulana =

Genus of woodlice

Merulana is a genus of woodlice belonging to the family Armadillidae. The type specimen for this genus was originally described as Armadillo rugosus by Gustav Budde-Lund in 1885. Budde-Lund first described Merulana as subgenus of the now defunct genus Spherillo in 1913. The mention of Merulana rugosus as type species of Merulana by Harold Gordon Jackson in 1941 is generally considered the official designation for this genus. There are currently 12 species in this genus.

== Distribution ==
This genus has been found in Australia, Chatham Islands, and New Caledonia.

== Species ==
- Merulana bicarinata (Budde-Lund, 1913)
- Merulana boydensis Lewis, 1998
- Merulana canaliculata (Budde-Lund, 1904)
- Merulana chathamensis (Budde-Lund, 1904)
- Merulana exilis (Budde-Lund, 1885)
- Merulana helmsiana (Chilton, 1916)
- Merulana hispida Vandel, 1973
- Merulana impressifrons (Budde-Lund, 1904)
- Merulana iniqua (Budde-Lund, 1904)
- Merulana noduligera Verhoeff, 1926
- Merulana rugosa (Budde-Lund, 1885)
- Merulana translucida (Budde-Lund, 1885)

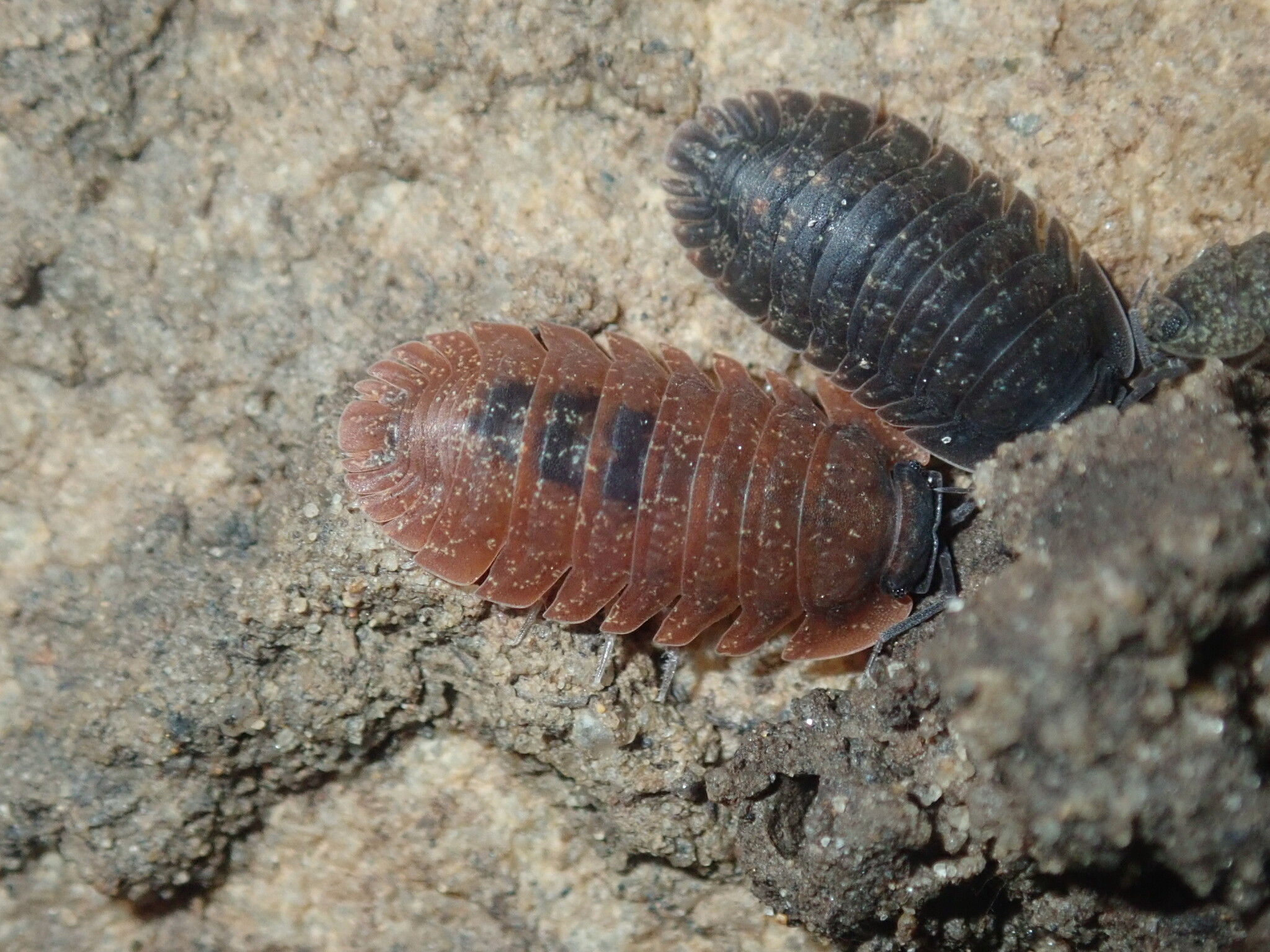
Merulana helmsiana
