= Hawaiodillo =

Scientific classification
- Kingdom: Animalia
- Phylum: Arthropoda
- Class: Malacostraca
- Order: Isopoda
- Suborder: Oniscidea
- Family: Armadillidae
- Genus: Hawaiodillo; Verhoeff, 1926

Genus of crustaceans

Hawaiodillo is a genus of woodlice belonging to the family Armadillidae. This genus was described in 1926 by Karl Wilhelm Verhoeff. The type specimen for this species was originally described as a Armadillo perkinsi. There are currently three species in this genus.

== Distribution ==
This genus is found only in Hawaii on the islands of Maui and Kauaʻi.

== Species ==
- Hawaiodillo danae (Dollfus, 1900)
- Hawaiodillo perkinsi (Dollfus, 1900)
- Hawaiodillo sharpi (Dollfus, 1900)
