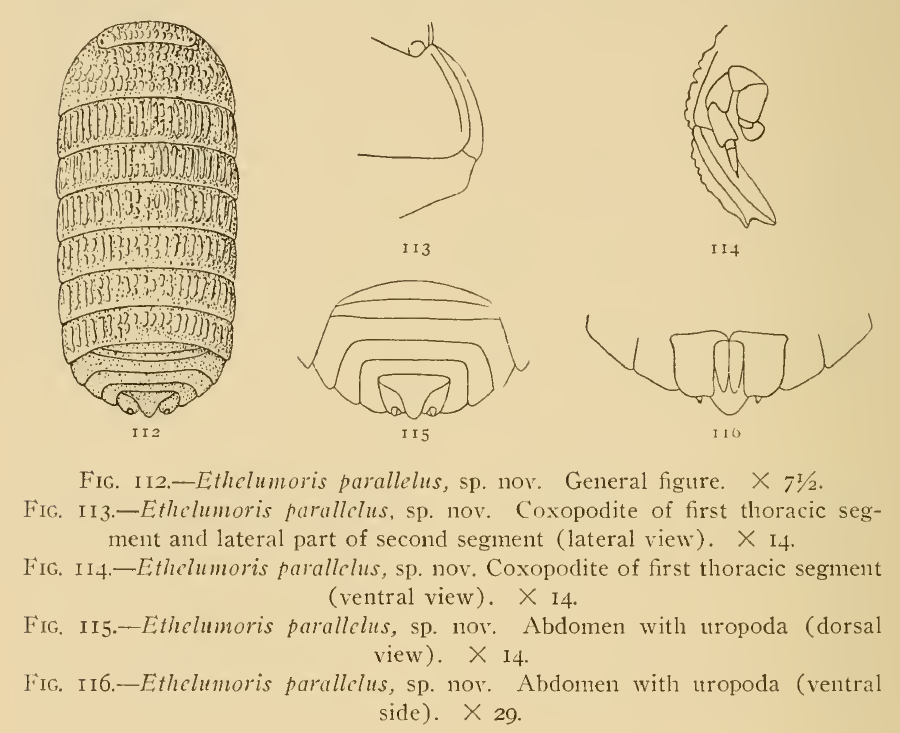

Scientific classification
- Kingdom: Animalia
- Phylum: Arthropoda
- Class: Malacostraca
- Order: Isopoda
- Suborder: Oniscidea
- Family: Armadillidae
- Genus: Ethelumoris; Richardson, 1907

= Ethelumoris =

Genus of woodlice

Ethelumoris is a genus of woodlice belonging to the family Armadillidae. This genus was described in 1907 by Harriet Richardson who originally placed this genus in the family Eubelidae. The type specimen for this species is a Ethelumoris parallelus from Mt. Coffee, Liberia. There are currently two species in this genus.

== Description ==
Ethelumoris sp. have a second pair of antennae that is short, and the flagellum has two segments. Their first thoracic segment has broad epimera (side plates) that originate from the underside and extend along the full length of the sides. These plates extend past the rear corners of the segment and are split at the back by a deep groove, forming a large inner part and a smaller outer part.

Their second and third pereon segments have small, triangular side projections. On the underside, the epimera appear as a sharp point on the second segment and as a low ridge on the third segment.

Their sixth pereon segment is triangular at the base and ends in a triangular projection with a rounded tip. The base of their uropods are roughly square in shape, with a shallow notch at the back where the outer branch is attached. A side lobe extends behind this outer branch. The inner branch of the uropod is not visible from below because it is covered by the final abdominal segment; it arises from the inner upper corner of the base and is cone-shaped.

== Distribution ==
This genus has been found in Cameroon, Liberia, and Fernando Poo Island, Equatorial Guinea.

== Species ==
- Ethelumoris parallelus Richardson, 1907
- Ethelumoris setosus Schmalfuss & Ferrara, 1983
