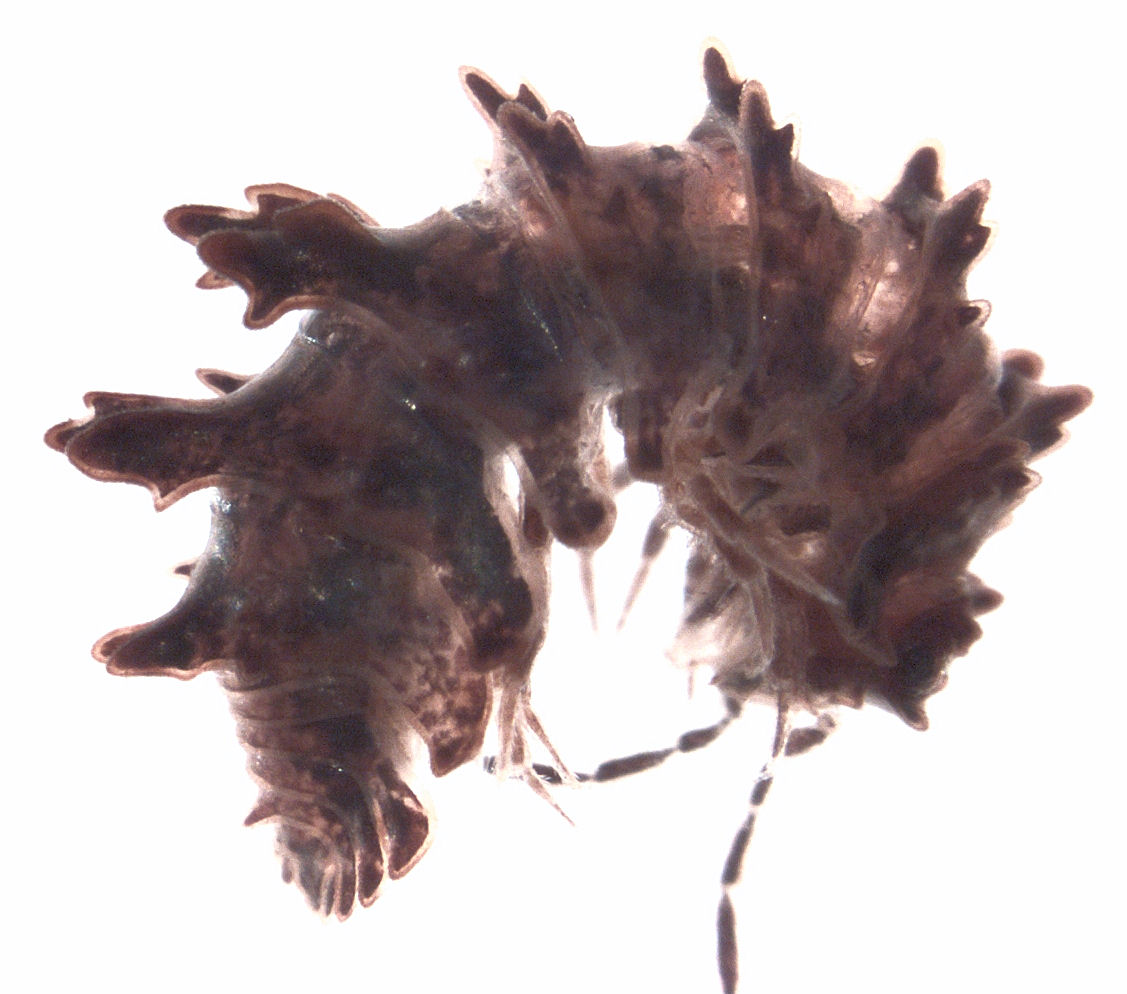
- Coronadillo sp.

Scientific classification
- Kingdom: Animalia
- Phylum: Arthropoda
- Class: Malacostraca
- Order: Isopoda
- Suborder: Oniscidea
- Family: Armadillidae
- Genus: Coronadillo; Taiti, Paoli & Ferrara, 1998

= Coronadillo =

Genus of woodlice

Coronadillo is a genus of woodlice belonging to the family Armadillidae. This genus was first described in 1972 by Albert Vandel. This genus was subsequently revalidated by choosing a type species in 1993 by Stefano Taiti, Pasquino Paoli, and Franco Ferrara. The type specimen for this species is a Coronadillo milleri from New Zealand. There are currently 3 species in this genus.

== Description ==
Coronadillo isopods have similar cephalon ornamentation to some other members of their family, especially the genera Anchicubaris and Pyrgoniscus.

== Distribution ==
Coronadillo isopods have only been found on the North Island of New Zealand.

== Species ==
- Coronadillo hamiltoni (Chilton, 1901)
- Coronadillo milleri (Chilton, 1917) = Cubaris milleri Chilton, 1917
- Coronadillo suteri (Chilton, 1915)
