= Nataldillo =

Scientific classification
- Kingdom: Animalia
- Phylum: Arthropoda
- Clade: Pancrustacea
- Class: Malacostraca
- Order: Isopoda
- Suborder: Oniscidea
- Family: Armadillidae
- Genus: Nataldillo; Taiti, Paoli & Ferrara, 1998

Genus of crustaceans

Nataldillo is a genus of isopods belonging to the family Armadillidae. This genus was originally described in 1942 by Karl Wilhelm Verhoeff but was not officially described until 1998 by Stefano Taiti, Pasquino Paoli, and Franco Ferrera. The type specimen for this genus is a Nataldillo burnupi from Natal. There is currently only one species in this genus.

== Species ==
- Nataldillo burnupi (Collinge, 1917) = Nataldillo brauni (Verhoeff, 1942); Cubaris burnupi (Collinge, 1917)
