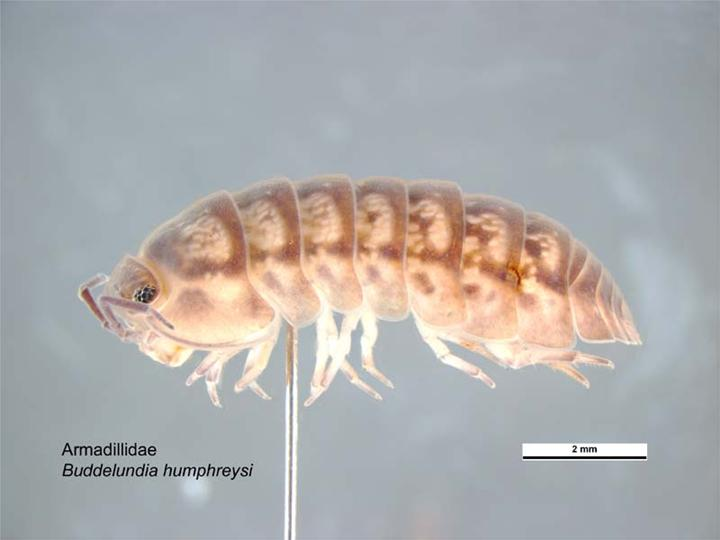
- Buddelundia humphreysi

Scientific classification
- Kingdom: Animalia
- Phylum: Arthropoda
- Class: Malacostraca
- Order: Isopoda
- Suborder: Oniscidea
- Family: Armadillidae
- Genus: Buddelundia; Michaelsen, 1912

Type species
- Armadillo labiatus Budde-Lund, 1912

= Buddelundia =

Genus of woodlice

Buddelundia is a genus of woodlouse within the family Armadillidae. Members of the genus are found distributed in Australia, with a majority of findings being in Western Australia.

== Species ==
- Buddelundia albinogrisescens Wahrberg, 1922
- Buddelundia albomaculata (Budde-Lund, 1912)
- Buddelundia albomarginata Wahrberg, 1922
- Buddelundia binotata (Budde-Lund, 1912)
- Buddelundia bipartita (Budde-Lund, 1912)
- Buddelundia brevicauda (Dollfus, 1898)
- Buddelundia bulbosa Wahrberg, 1922
- Buddelundia callosa (Budde-Lund, 1912)
- Buddelundia cinerascens (Budde-Lund, 1912)
- Buddelundia eberhardi Taiti, 2014
- Buddelundia frontosa (Budde-Lund, 1912)
- Buddelundia grisea Dalens, 1992
- Buddelundia hirsuta Dalens, 1992
- Buddelundia humphreysi Dalens, 1992
- Buddelundia inequalis (Budde-Lund, 1912)
- Buddelundia labiata (Budde-Lund, 1912)
- Buddelundia laevigata (Budde-Lund, 1912)
- Buddelundia lateralis (Budde-Lund, 1913)
- Buddelundia monticola (Budde-Lund, 1912)
- Buddelundia nigripes (Budde-Lund, 1912)
- Buddelundia nitidissima (Budde-Lund, 1912)
- Buddelundia opaca (Budde-Lund, 1912)
- Buddelundia quadritracheata (Budde-Lund, 1913)
- Buddelundia rugifrons (Budde-Lund, 1912)
- Buddelundia subinermis (Budde-Lund, 1912)
- Buddelundia sulcata (Budde-Lund, 1912)
- Buddelundia tomentosa (Budde-Lund, 1912)
