= Tongadillo =

Scientific classification
- Kingdom: Animalia
- Phylum: Arthropoda
- Clade: Pancrustacea
- Class: Malacostraca
- Order: Isopoda
- Suborder: Oniscidea
- Family: Armadillidae
- Genus: Tongadillo; Dalens, 1988
- Species: T. punctata

Binomial name
- Tongadillo punctata Dalens, 1988

Genus of woodlice

Tongadillo is a genus of woodlice belonging to the family Armadillidae. This genus was described in 1988 by Henri Dalens. The type specimen for this species is a Tongadillo punctata from Tonga, and it is the only species in this genus.

== Distribution ==
This genus has only been found on the islands of Tonga.
