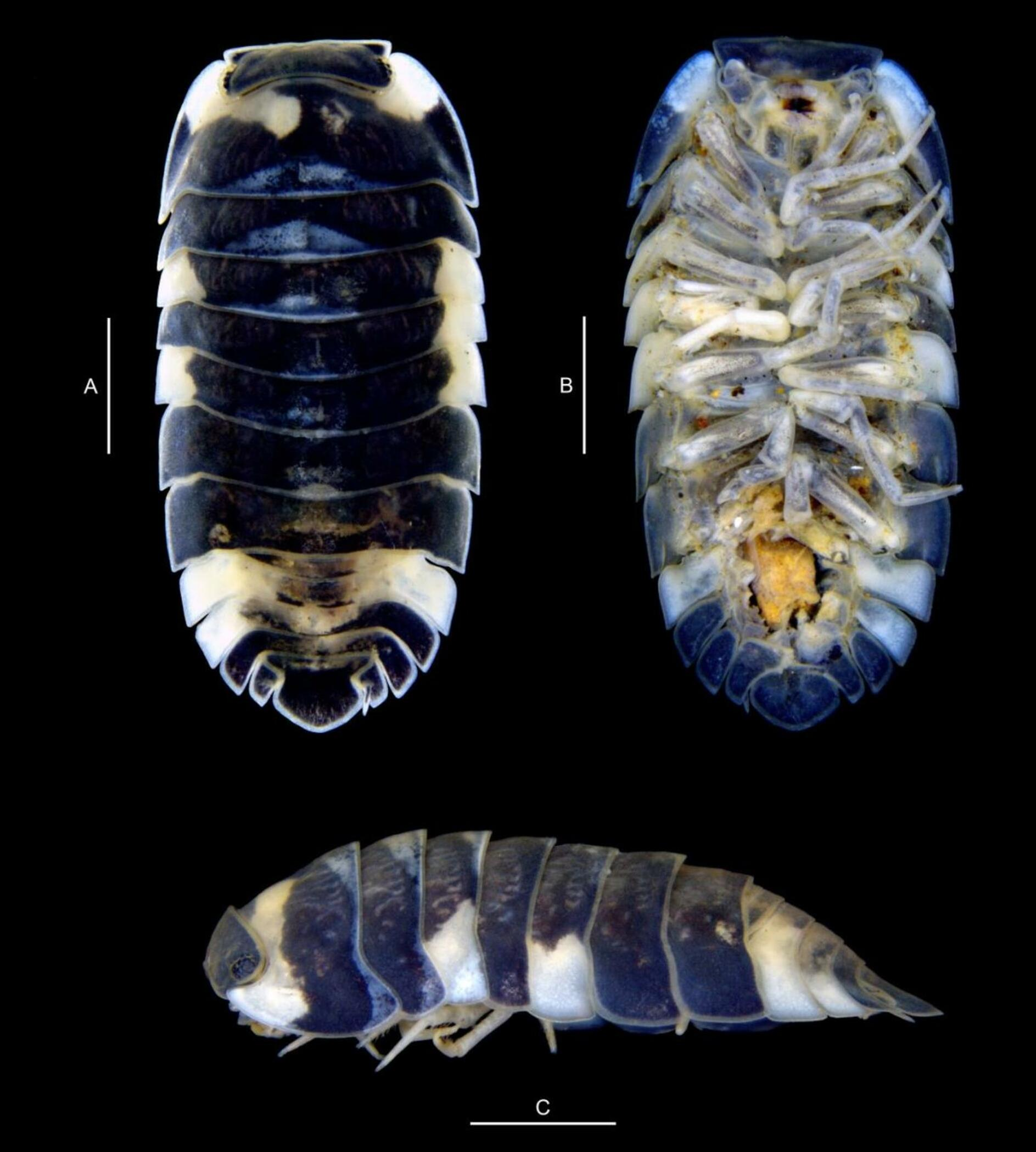

Scientific classification
- Kingdom: Animalia
- Phylum: Arthropoda
- Class: Malacostraca
- Order: Isopoda
- Suborder: Oniscidea
- Family: Armadillidae
- Genus: Merulanella; Budde-Lund, 1895

Species
- See text

= Merulanella =

Genus of woodlouse

Merulanella is a genus of isopods within the family Armadillidae.

First described in 1895, currently, there are at least three described species of Merulanella:

== Species ==
- Merulanella carinata Verhoeff, 1926
- Merulanella dollfusi (Stebbing, 1900)
- Merulanella wahrbergi Verhoeff, 1926
