= Bethalus =

Scientific classification
- Kingdom: Animalia
- Phylum: Arthropoda
- Class: Malacostraca
- Order: Isopoda
- Suborder: Oniscidea
- Family: Armadillidae
- Genus: Bethalus; Budde-Lund, 1909

Type species
- Armadillo nigrinus Budde-Lund, 1885

Genus of woodlice

Bethalus is a genus of woodlice belonging to the family Armadillidae. The type specimen for this species was originally designated as Armadillo nigrinus by Gustav Budde-Lund in 1885 but in 1909 he revised this designation to Bethalus nigrinus, creating a new genus in the process. The type specimen is believed to have been collected in South Africa. There are at least 20 species in this genus.

== Description ==
This genus is able to conglobate. The epimera (side plates) on their first and second pereon segments have small lobes.

== Distribution ==
Bethalus spp. are found in South Africa, Malawi, and Mozambique. Bethalus live in very dry environments in comparison to many other isopod genera.

== Species ==
Numerous species have been described in Bethalus, including:

- Bethalus arator Barnard, 1937
- Bethalus aureoniger Barnard, 1960
- Bethalus bipunctatus Barnard, 1958
- Bethalus cordatus (Dollfus, 1895)
- Bethalus egens (Budde-Lund, 1904)
- Bethalus gorongozae Barnard, 1960
- Bethalus lawrencei Barnard, 1937
- Bethalus limbatus (Brandt, 1833)
- Bethalus lineatus Taiti & Ferrara, 1987
- Bethalus linguitelson Barnard, 1960
- Bethalus mariepensis Barnard, 1960
- Bethalus nigrinus (Budde-Lund, 1885)
- Bethalus oraniensis (Dollfus, 1895)
- Bethalus panurus (Budde-Lund, 1904)
- Bethalus pretoriensis (Dollfus, 1895)
- Bethalus rhodesiae Barnard, 1932
- Bethalus simplex (Dollfus, 1895)
- Bethalus statumenes Barnard, 1960
- Bethalus stricticauda (Dollfus, 1895)
- Bethalus trichardti Barnard, 1960
