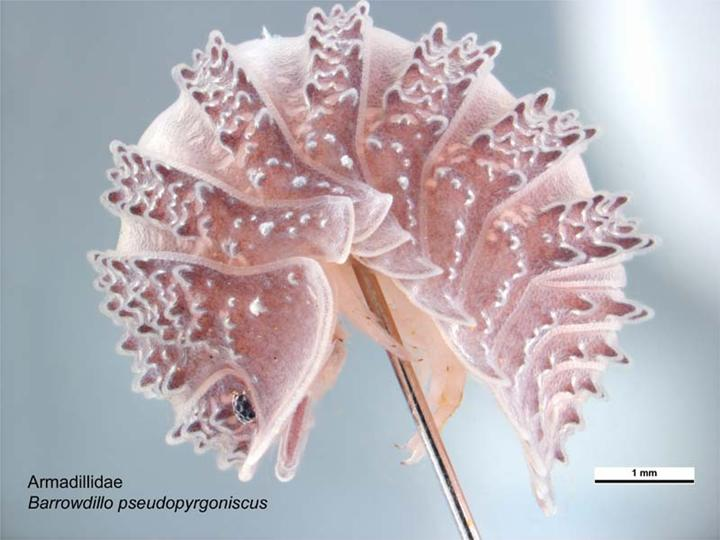
- Barrowdillo pseudopyrgoniscus

Scientific classification
- Kingdom: Animalia
- Phylum: Arthropoda
- Clade: Pancrustacea
- Class: Malacostraca
- Order: Isopoda
- Suborder: Oniscidea
- Family: Armadillidae
- Genus: Barrowdillo; Dalens, 1993
- Species: B. pseudopyrgoniscus

Binomial name
- Barrowdillo pseudopyrgoniscus Dalens, 1993

= Barrowdillo =

Genus of woodlice

Barrowdillo is a genus of woodlice belonging to the family Armadillidae. This genus was described in 1933 by Henri Dalens. The type specimen for this species is a Barrowdillo pseudopyrgoniscus from Barrow Island (Western Australia), and it is the only species in this genus.

== Description ==
The holotype specimen measures 9.6 mm long and 4.8 mm wide. The body is convex, with the side plates (epimera) of the thorax and abdomen, as well as the telson, extending outward horizontally. The head, body segments, and tail are covered in tubercles arranged in alternating rows. The head has three tubercles, the first body segment has seven, later segments have fewer, and the tail has three.

The head bears a forward-projecting frontal lamina above the vertex. The eyes are small, black, and separate, each made up of 12–13 ommatidia. The first body segment has a small internal lobe, and another tooth-shaped lobe is present on the second segment. Interlocking structures between segments are weak at the front of the body and more developed toward the rear, but absent on the abdominal segments.

The antennae are short and stout, with a two-segmented tip, the final segment being much longer than the first. Mouthparts are simple but well developed, including a mandible with small bristle-like structures and a maxilliped with a stout spine. The walking legs have reduced claws.

The uropods are reduced, with a sharp inner base and very small outer branches. In males, the second pair of abdominal appendages are curved at the tip.

== Distribution ==
This genus is only known from two caves on Barrow Island. However, it is not believed to be a troglobite.

== Etymology ==
The name Barrowdillo is derived from its place of discovery, Barrow Island, and the common isopod suffix "-dillo".

== Species ==
- Barrowdillo pseudopyrgoniscus Dalens, 1993
