= Chelomadillo =

Scientific classification
- Kingdom: Animalia
- Phylum: Arthropoda
- Class: Malacostraca
- Order: Isopoda
- Suborder: Oniscidea
- Family: Armadillidae
- Genus: Chelomadillo

Genus of woodlice

Chelomadillo is a genus of woodlice belonging to the family Armadillidae. The type specimen for this genus was originally described in 1931 by Werner Herold but it was not officially designated until 1993 by Stefano Taiti, Pasquino Paoli, and Franco Ferrera. There are currently four species in this genus.

== Distribution ==
This genus has only been found on Flores island, Indonesia.

== Species ==
- Chelomadillo nitens (Herold, 1931)
- Chelomadillo pustulosus (Herold, 1931)
- Chelomadillo setosus (Herold, 1931)
- Chelomadillo tuberifrons (Herold, 1931)
