= Hybodillo =

Scientific classification
- Kingdom: Animalia
- Phylum: Arthropoda
- Class: Malacostraca
- Order: Isopoda
- Suborder: Oniscidea
- Family: Armadillidae
- Genus: Hybodillo; Taiti, Paoli & Ferrara, 1998

Genus of woodlice

Hybodillo is a genus of woodlice belonging to the family Armadillidae. This genus was originally described in 1931 by Werner Herold, but wasn't formally described until 1998 by Stefano Taiti, Pasquino Paoli, and Franco Ferrara. The type specimen for this species is a Hybodillo colocasiae from Java. There are currently four species in this genus.

== Description ==
The body of Hybodillo sp. is small, less than 3.5mm in body length. Their tergite is covered with many granules or tubercles. They have small eyes composed of 5-6 ocelli or may be blind.

== Distribution ==
This genus has been found in the Bismarck Archipelago, Indonesia (Java and Sumatra), and Japan.

== Species ==
- Hybodillo colocasiae (Herold, 1931)
- Hybodillo dianicus (Dai & Cai, 1998)
- Hybodillo ishiii Nunomura, 1990
- Hybodillo monocellatus Ferrara & Taiti, 1982
