= Anthrodillo =

Scientific classification
- Kingdom: Animalia
- Phylum: Arthropoda
- Class: Malacostraca
- Order: Isopoda
- Suborder: Oniscidea
- Family: Armadillidae
- Genus: Anthrodillo; Verhoeff, 1946
- Species: A. perkeo

Binomial name
- Anthrodillo perkeo Verhoeff, 1946

Genus of woodlice

Anthrodillo is a genus of woodlice belonging to the family Armadillidae. This genus was described in 1946 by Karl Wilhelm Verhoeff. The type specimen for this species is an Anthrodillo perkeo from Myanmar and it is currently the only species in this genus.

== Distribution ==
This genus has only been found in Pekking Cave in Myanmar.

== Species ==
- Anthrodillo perkeo Verhoeff, 1946
