= Cristarmadillo =

Scientific classification
- Kingdom: Animalia
- Phylum: Arthropoda
- Class: Malacostraca
- Order: Isopoda
- Suborder: Oniscidea
- Family: Armadillidae
- Genus: Cristarmadillo; Arcangeli, 1950

Genus of woodlice

Cristarmadillo is a genus of woodlice belonging to the family Armadillidae. This genus was described in 1950 by Alceste Arcangeli. The type specimen for this species is a Cristarmadillo gerardi from Kalina, Democratic Republic of the Congo. There are currently three species in this genus.

== Description ==
Cristarmadillo sp. have a frontal lamina which protrudes far beyond the head but is not separated from it by a groove. Their pereonal and pleonal epimera point outwards in a nearly horizontal direction. They have interlocking structures on all pereon segments and on their third and fourth pleon segments. They have an hour-glass-shaped telson with the distal part distinctly longer than basal one. The inner lobe of their first thoracic segment is large but shorter than the outer lobe, and their third to fourth thoracic segments have ventral lobes. Their uropod exopodite is well-developed but does not reach the tip of the protopodite.

== Distribution ==
This genus has only been found in the Democratic Republic of the Congo. At least one species in this genus (C. arcangelii) has been found in a cave.

== Species ==
- Cristarmadillo arcangelii Schmalfuss & Ferrara, 1983
- Cristarmadillo gerardi Arcangeli, 1950
- Cristarmadillo pardii Ferrara, Schmalfuss & Taiti, 1987
