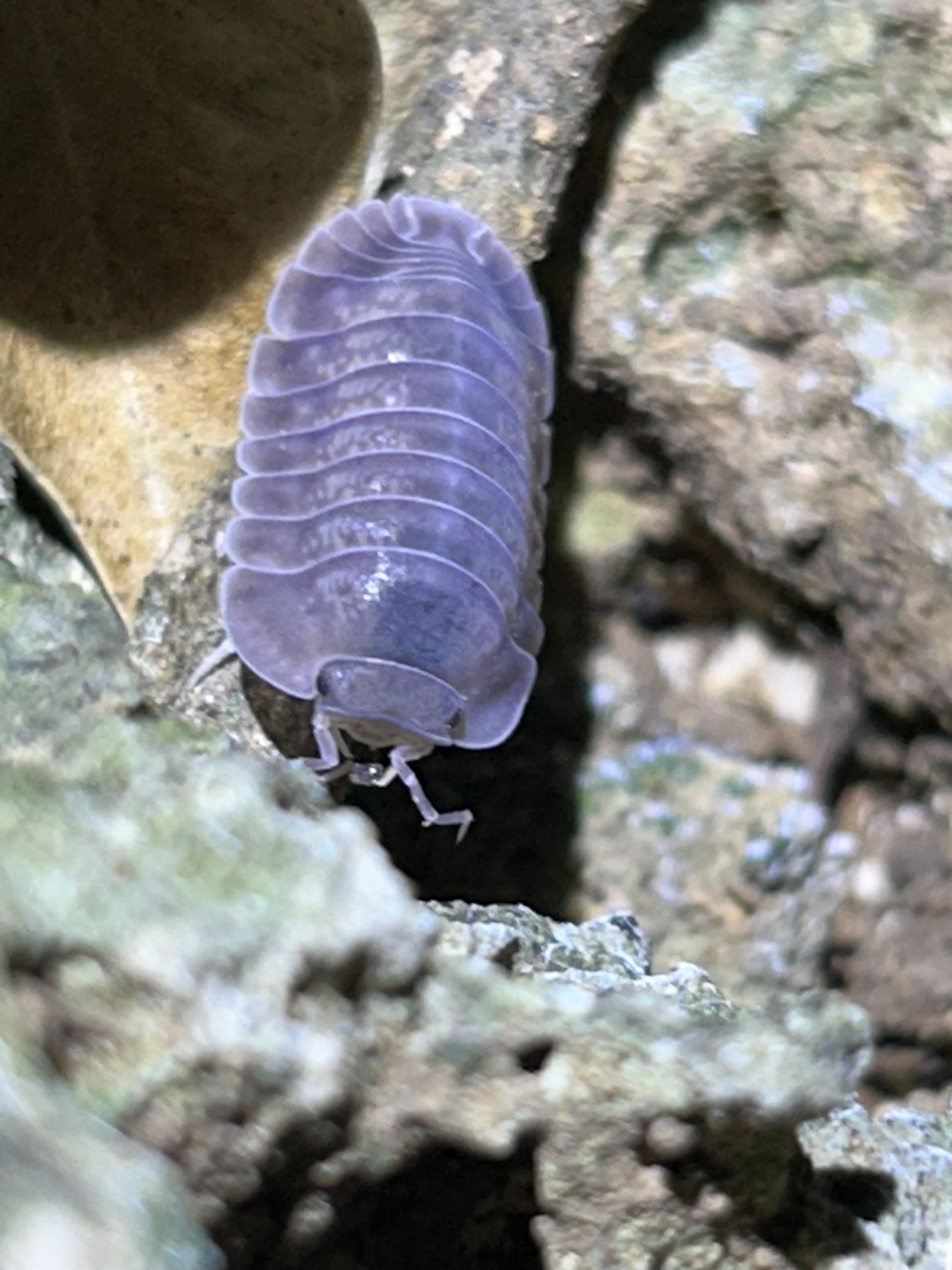
- Nesodillo archangelii from Pingtung County, Taiwan

Scientific classification
- Kingdom: Animalia
- Phylum: Arthropoda
- Class: Malacostraca
- Order: Isopoda
- Suborder: Oniscidea
- Family: Armadillidae
- Genus: Nesodillo; Verhoeff, 1926

Synonyms
- Triadillo Vandel, 1973

= Nesodillo =

Genus of woodlice

Nesodillo is a genus of woodlice belonging to the family Armadillidae. This genus was described in 1926 by Karl Wilhelm Verhoeff. The type specimen for this species is a Nesodillo sarasini from New Caledonia. There are currently 23 species in this genus.

== Description ==
Nesodillo sp. are characterized by their semicircular ventral lobes on the epimera of their first to third thoracic segment.

== Distribution ==
This genus has been found in much of South and Southeast Asia including Borneo, India, Indonesia, Japan, Myanmar, New Caledonia, New Guinea, the Philippines, Sri Lanka, and Taiwan.

== Species ==
- Nesodillo annandalei (Collinge, 1914)
- Nesodillo arcangelii Verhoeff, 1928
- Nesodillo bocki Verhoeff, 1938
- Nesodillo burmanus Verhoeff, 1946
- Nesodillo canalensis Verhoeff, 1926
- Nesodillo enoensis Jackson, 1930
- Nesodillo fritschei Verhoeff, 1938
- Nesodillo incisus Verhoeff, 1926
- Nesodillo jonesi Verhoeff, 1936
- Nesodillo kimi Jeon & Kwon, 2009
- Nesodillo lacustris Verhoeff, 1926
- Nesodillo longicornis Verhoeff, 1926
- Nesodillo medius Verhoeff, 1926
- Nesodillo monticola (Vandel, 1973)
- Nesodillo pacificus Verhoeff, 1926
- Nesodillo philippinensis Jeon & Kwon, 2009
- Nesodillo plasticus Verhoeff, 1926
- Nesodillo pronyensis Verhoeff, 1926
- Nesodillo sarasini Verhoeff, 1926
- Nesodillo schellenbergi Verhoeff, 1928 represented as Nesodillo schellenbergi schellenbergi Verhoeff, 1928
- Nesodillo silvestris Jackson, 1930
- Nesodillo tenasserimus Verhoeff, 1946
- Nesodillo verhoeffi Herold, 1931

=== Former species ===
- Nesodillo murinus (Brandt, 1833)
- Nesodillo papuae Jackson, 1930 = Papuadillo papuae
