= Polyacanthus =

Scientific classification
- Kingdom: Animalia
- Phylum: Arthropoda
- Class: Malacostraca
- Order: Isopoda
- Suborder: Oniscidea
- Family: Armadillidae
- Genus: Polyacanthus; Budde-Lund, 1909

Genus of woodlice

Polyacanthus is a genus of woodlice belonging to the family Armadillidae. This genus was described in 1909 by Gustav Budde-Lund. The type specimen for this species is a Polyacanthus aculeatus from Cabinda Province. There are currently two species in this genus.

== Description ==
The dorsal surface of this genus has characteristic long spines. Their frontal lamina protrude past the end of the head. Their epimera are very long, rectangular, and point outwards in a nearly horizontal direction. The first and second thoracic segment of this genus have rounded ventral lobes. Their second to seventh pereon segments have a broad triangular tooth directed forwards at the base of the external spines. Their telson is hour-glass-shaped with a long distal part and truncated apex. Their uropod protopodite is rectangular, and their exopodite is reduced.

== Distribution ==
This genus has been found in Angola and South Africa.

== Species ==
- Polyacanthus aculeatus (Budde-Lund, 1885)
- Polyacanthus transvaalensis Barnard, 1932
