= Xestodillo =

Scientific classification
- Kingdom: Animalia
- Phylum: Arthropoda
- Clade: Pancrustacea
- Class: Malacostraca
- Order: Isopoda
- Suborder: Oniscidea
- Family: Armadillidae
- Genus: Xestodillo; Verhoeff, 1926

Genus of woodlice

Xestodillo is a genus of woodlice belonging to the family Armadillidae. This genus was originally described in 1926 by Karl Wilhelm Verhoeff and was officially designated in 1998 by Stefano Taiti, Pasquino Paoli and Franco Ferrera. The type specimen for this species is a Xestodillo zebricolor from Lifou Island. There are currently three species in this genus.

== Distribution ==
This genus is found in New Caledonia and Vanuatu.

== Species ==
- Xestodillo lifouensis (Verhoeff, 1926)
- Xestodillo politus (Verhoeff, 1926)
- Xestodillo zebricolor (Stebbing, 1900)
