= Aethiopodillo =

Scientific classification
- Kingdom: Animalia
- Phylum: Arthropoda
- Clade: Pancrustacea
- Class: Malacostraca
- Order: Isopoda
- Suborder: Oniscidea
- Family: Armadillidae
- Genus: Aethiopodillo; Taiti, Paoli & Ferrara, 1998

Type species
- Aethiopodillo sulcatus Verhoeff, 1942

Genus of woodlice

Aethiopodillo is a genus of woodlice belonging to the family Armadillidae. This genus was first documented by Karl Wilhelm Verhoeff in 1942 but was not officially designated until 1998 by Stefano Taiti, Pasquino Paoli, and Franco Ferrara. The type specimen for this species is an Aethiopodillo sulcata from Mozambique. There are currently two species in this genus.

== Description ==
Aethiopodillo are morphologically similar to Caribodillo isopods of the same family.

== Distribution ==
Aethiopodillo isopods have been found in Mozambique and Tanzania.

== Species ==
The species currently assigned to this genus are:

- Aethiopodillo griseus (Verhoeff, 1942)
- Aethiopodillo sulcatus (Verhoeff, 1942)
