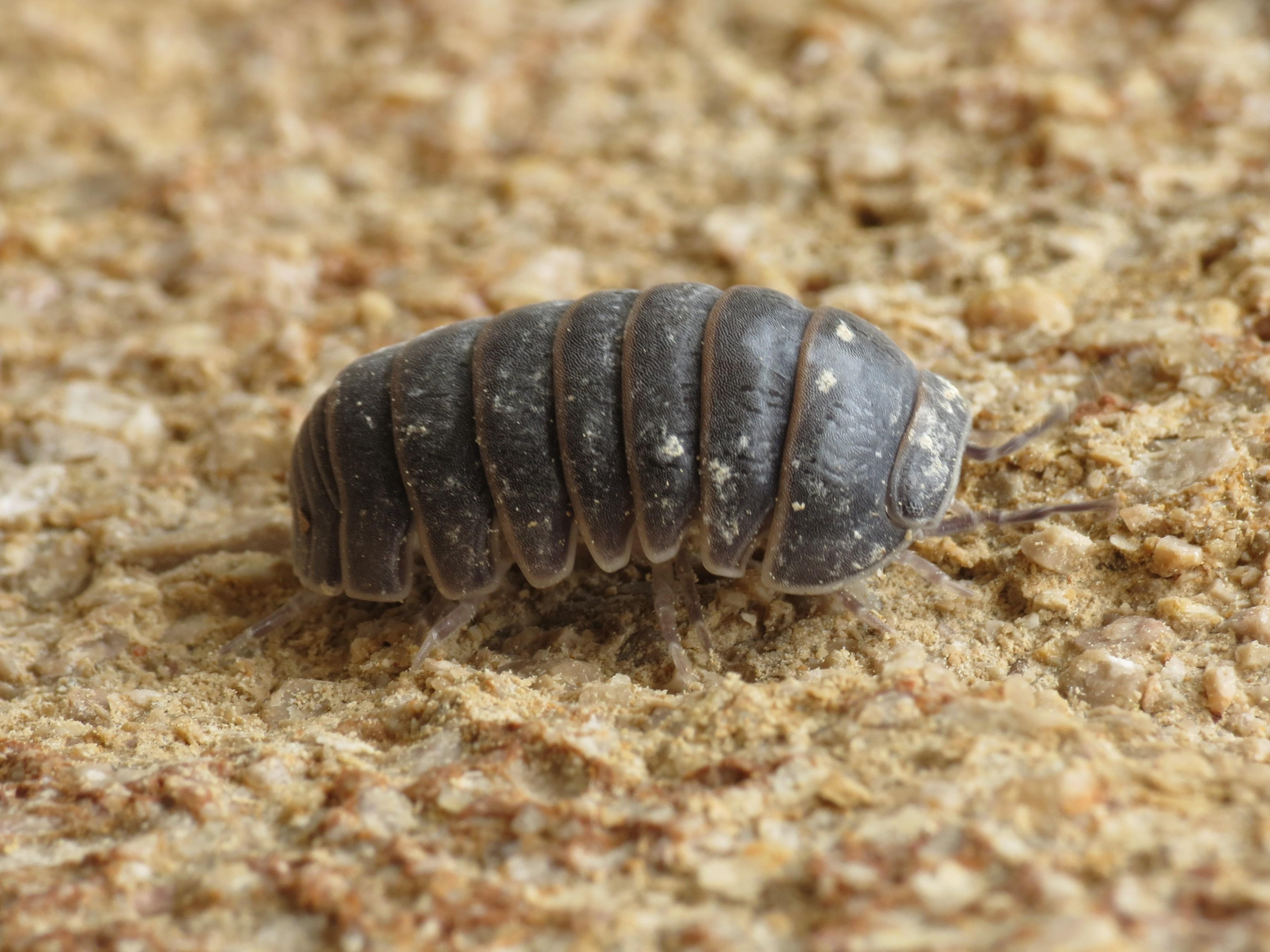
- Armadillo officinalis

Scientific classification
- Kingdom: Animalia
- Phylum: Arthropoda
- Class: Malacostraca
- Order: Isopoda
- Suborder: Oniscidea
- Family: Armadillidae
- Genus: Armadillo; Latreille, 1802

= Armadillo (crustacean) =

Genus of crustaceans

Armadillo is a genus of isopods belonging to the family Armadillidae.

The genus has an almost cosmopolitan distribution.

== Species ==
The following species are recognised in the genus Armadillo:

- Armadillo affinis (Dana, 1854)
- Armadillo albipes Dollfus, 1898
- Armadillo albomarginatus Dollfus, 1892
- Armadillo albus Schmalfuss, 1996
- Armadillo alievi Schmalfuss, 1990
- Armadillo almerius Mattern, 1999
- Armadillo ankaratrae Barnard, 1958
- Armadillo arcuatus Dollfus, 1898
- Armadillo atratus C.Koch, 1840
- Armadillo bituberculatus Budde-Lund, 1912
- Armadillo carmelensis Schmalfuss, 1996
- Armadillo cassida Budde-Lund, 1908
- Armadillo cavernae Wahrberg, 1922
- Armadillo collinus Budde-Lund, 1895
- Armadillo confalonierii Brian, 1932
- Armadillo conglobator Budde-Lund, 1904
- Armadillo distinctus C.Koch, 1840
- Armadillo erythroleucus Budde-Lund, 1904
- Armadillo euthele Barnard, 1958
- Armadillo exter Barnard, 1960
- Armadillo fenerivei Barnard, 1958
- Armadillo flavus Budde-Lund, 1912
- Armadillo glomerulus Budde-Lund, 1895
- Armadillo guttatus Risso, 1827
- Armadillo haedillus Barnard, 1968
- Armadillo hirsutus C.Koch, 1856
- Armadillo immotus Budde-Lund, 1904
- Armadillo infuscatus Budde-Lund, 1902
- Armadillo insulanus Arcangeli, 1934
- Armadillo interger Budde-Lund, 1912
- Armadillo intermixtus Budde-Lund, 1904
- Armadillo jordanius Schmalfuss, 1996
- Armadillo karametae Campos-Filho, Taiti & Sfenthourakis, 2023
- Armadillo kinzelbachi Schmalfuss, 1996
- Armadillo konstantinoui Campos-Filho, Dimitriou & Sfenthourakis, 2023
- Armadillo laminatus C.Koch, 1840
- Armadillo liliputanus Dollfus, 1895
- Armadillo luctuosus C.Koch, 1840
- Armadillo makuae Barnard, 1932
- Armadillo marmoratus Risso, 1827
- Armadillo mayeti Simon, 1885
- Armadillo medius C.Koch, 1840
- Armadillo moncayotus Mattern, 1999
- Armadillo montanus Budde-Lund, 1904
- Armadillo nigromarginatus Budde-Lund, 1904
- Armadillo obliquidens (Barnard, 1932)
- Armadillo officinalis Duméril, 1816
- Armadillo pallidus Budde-Lund, 1902
- Armadillo platypleon Schmalfuss, 1986
- Armadillo proximatus Budde-Lund, 1904
- Armadillo pseudomayeti Mattern, 1999
- Armadillo pulchellus C.Koch, 1840
- Armadillo pulchellus Schnitzler, 1853
- Armadillo pulcherrimus Risso, 1827
- Armadillo punctatissimus Risso, 1827
- Armadillo pygmaeus Budde-Lund, 1912
- Armadillo rupestris Risso, 1827
- Armadillo salisburyensis (Barnard, 1932)
- Armadillo sodalis Budde-Lund, 1885
- Armadillo solumcolus Schultz, 1982
- Armadillo sordidus Schmalfuss, 1996
- Armadillo tenebrosus C.Koch, 1840
- Armadillo testudinatus C.Koch, 1840
- Armadillo transpilosus Barnard, 1960
- Armadillo troglophilus Vandel, 1955
- Armadillo tuberculatus Vogl, 1876
- Armadillo vumbaensis (Barnard, 1949)
