= Akermania =

Scientific classification
- Kingdom: Animalia
- Phylum: Arthropoda
- Clade: Pancrustacea
- Class: Malacostraca
- Order: Isopoda
- Suborder: Oniscidea
- Family: Armadillidae
- Genus: Akermania; Collinge, 1919

Type species
- Akermania spinosa Collinge, 1919

Genus of woodlice

Akermania is a genus of woodlice belonging to the family Armadillidae. This genus was described in 1919 by Walter Edward Collinge. The type specimen for this species is an Akermania spinosa from South Africa. There are currently four species in this genus.

== Description ==
The defining characteristics of the genus Akermania were first outlined by in 1960 by Keppel Harcourt Barnard, who emphasized the blunt, truncated shape of the pleon, the square-shaped side plates of the third to fifth pereon segments, and the greatly reduced or absent outer branch of the uropod. Albert Vandel later revised this description, placing less emphasis on the shape of the pleon. Instead, he highlighted the more or less pointed shape of the side plates on the second to fourth segments, and especially the enlarged, square-shaped side plates on teh fifth to seventh segments.

== Distribution ==
Akermania isopods have been found in Madagascar, South Africa, and Sri Lanka.

== Species ==
This genus currently has four species:

- Akermania besucheti Argano & Manicastri, 1979
- Akermania coronata Barnard, 1949
- Akermania spinosa Collinge, 1919
- Akermania sylvatica Barnard, 1958

=== Former species ===
- Akermania hystrix Barnard, 1958 = Pseudolaureola hystrix
- Akermania longispina Barnard, 1956 = Laureola longispina
- Akermania miacantha Barnard, 1960 = Laureola miacantha
- Akermania paucispinosa Barnard, 1949 = Laureola paucispinosa (Barnard, 1949) (type by original designation).
