= Stigmops =

Scientific classification
- Kingdom: Animalia
- Phylum: Arthropoda
- Clade: Pancrustacea
- Class: Malacostraca
- Order: Isopoda
- Suborder: Oniscidea
- Family: Armadillidae
- Genus: Stigmops; Lillemets & Wilson, 2002

Genus of crustaceans

Stigmops is a genus of woodlice belonging to the family Armadillidae. This genus was described in 2002 by Birgitta Lillimets and George D.F. Wilson. The type specimen for this species is a Stigmops polyvelota from Lord Howe Island.

== Description ==
The most distinctive feature of Stigmops is their projecting lobes. Their cephalon has four projecting lobes and ridges above their eyes. Their first body segment has one midline anterior and two posterior lobes and their second to seventh body segments have a pair of lobes on their midline.

Their body is very convex with nearly flat epimera (side plates).

== Distribution ==
All 4 species in this genus are endemic to Lord Howe Island.

== Etymology ==
“Stigmops” means “pitted face”, based on the Greek “stigme” (a spot or prick) and “ops” (face). This name refers to the pits on the head seen in this genus.

== Species ==
There are currently four species in the genus Stigmops:

- Stigmops demiclavula (Lewis, 1998) (SYN. Anchicubaris demiclavula)
- Stigmops howensis (Lewis, 1998) (SYN. Anchicubaris howensis)
- Stigmops odontotergina Lillemets & Wilson, 2002
- Stigmops polyvelota Lillemets & Wilson, 2002
