= Quatuordillo =

Scientific classification
- Kingdom: Animalia
- Phylum: Arthropoda
- Clade: Pancrustacea
- Class: Malacostraca
- Order: Isopoda
- Suborder: Oniscidea
- Family: Armadillidae
- Genus: Quatuordillo; Taiti, 2014

Genus of woodlice

Quatuordillo is a genus of woodlice belonging to the family Armadillidae. This genus was described in 2014 by Stefano Taiti. The type specimen for this species is a Quatuordillo caecus from Western Australia, and it is the only species in this genus.

== Description ==
This genus has a very convex body with vertical epimera. They are able to fully conglobate. They have one line of noduli laterales per side on their thoracic segments. Their cephalon has a large frontal shield that slightly protrudes past the end of the head. Their first thoracic segment has a groove on the lateral margin and a schisma at posterolateral corner. The epimera of their second thoracic segments has large subtriangular ventral lobes that are obliquely directed. Their telson is hourglass-shaped. Their antennae are short and stout with flagellum made up of two articles (segments). Their mandibles consist of several short setae that arise from a single stem. Their pleopods are overlapping, and are all visible in ventral view. The exopods on their 1-4 thoracic segments have monospiracular covered lungs, and the exopod on segment 5 does not have respiratory structures. Their uropod have elongated protopods and small exopods inserted dorsally, near the medial margin.

== Distribution ==
This genus has only been described from caves in Western Australia.

== Species ==
- Quatuordillo caecus Taiti, 2014

== Etymology ==
The genus name Quatuordillo is derived from the Latin Quatuor meaning "four" and the suffix -dillo, a common ending for Oniscidae species. The name refers to the four pairs of lungs in the pleopods.
