= Acutodillo =

Scientific classification
- Kingdom: Animalia
- Phylum: Arthropoda
- Clade: Pancrustacea
- Class: Malacostraca
- Order: Isopoda
- Suborder: Oniscidea
- Family: Armadillidae
- Genus: Acutodillo; Kästle & Regalado Fernández, 2025

Genus of woodlice

Acutodillo is a genus of woodlice belonging to the family Armadillidae. The type specimen of this species was originally described as Spherillo peltatus by Gustav Budde-Lund in 1904. This specimen was then redescribed as Acutodillo peltatus by Benedikt Kästle and Omar Rafael Regalado Fernández in 2025. This type specimen was collected in Seychelles..

== Description ==
Acutodillo sp. have a smooth dorsal side covered in small scale setae. Their cephalothorax has a shield that extends just slightly past the end of the head. Their antennae are slender with a long flagellum that's second segment is twice as logn as its first. Their first segment has epimera (side plates) that have small, triangular ventral lobes that continue laterally as small ridges, not reaching lateral margin. The epimera on the second to fourth segments are triangular. The epimera on the fifth to seventh segments are rectangular. They have raised bumps in a straight line on segments two to seven, with the exception of segment four whose bumps are more medial. Their pleotelson is keeled and about as long as it is wide and with distinct pointed posterior tip.

== Distribution ==
This genus has only been found in Seychelles.

== Etymology ==
The genus name Acutodillo refers to the triangular appearance of the side plates of the genus' second to fourth thoracis segments and the pointed tip of the pleotelson.

== Species ==
- Acutodillo peltatus (Budde-Lund, 1904)
