= Revelosa =

Scientific classification
- Kingdom: Animalia
- Phylum: Arthropoda
- Class: Malacostraca
- Order: Isopoda
- Suborder: Oniscidea
- Family: Armadillidae
- Genus: Revelosa; Kästle & Degenhardt, 2025

Genus of woodlice

Revelosa is a genus of woodlice belonging to the family Armadillidae. This genus was described in 2025 by Benedikt Kästle and Oonagh Degenhardt. The type specimen for this species was originally described as Armadillo cassida by Gustav Budde-Lund in 1908 and the specimen is from Madagascar. There is currently only one species in this genus.

== Description ==
The bodies of Revelosa spp. are wide and flattened. Their frontal lamina (head shield) protrudes far past the end of the head. The second segment of their antennae is three times longer than first segment. Their antennula (first antenna) has three segments. Their first and second pereon segments have a small ventral lobe situated at the proximal end of the epimera (side plates) and close to posterior margin. The epimera of their third to seventh pereon segments do not have ventral structures. Their telson is triangular, and longer than it is wide. Their uropod has a protopodite that is longer than it is wide and has an exopodite that is moderately sized, that is inserted medially on the protopodite. All pleopod exopods have monospiracular covered lungs.

== Behaviour ==
This genus is a "clinger" eco-morphotype. These isopods respond to threats by staying still and clinging tightly to their substrate. Like other "clinger" isopods they have defensive morphological adaptations which include flattened bodies and shorter legs.

== Distribution ==
This species has been found in Madagascar.

== Etymology ==
Revelosa (fem.) is derived from the Latin "revelo" meaning to reveal or uncover, referring to the taxonomic rediscovery of the species and the clarification of its long-standing taxonomic uncertainty.

== Species ==
- Revelosa cassida (Budde-Lund, 1908)
