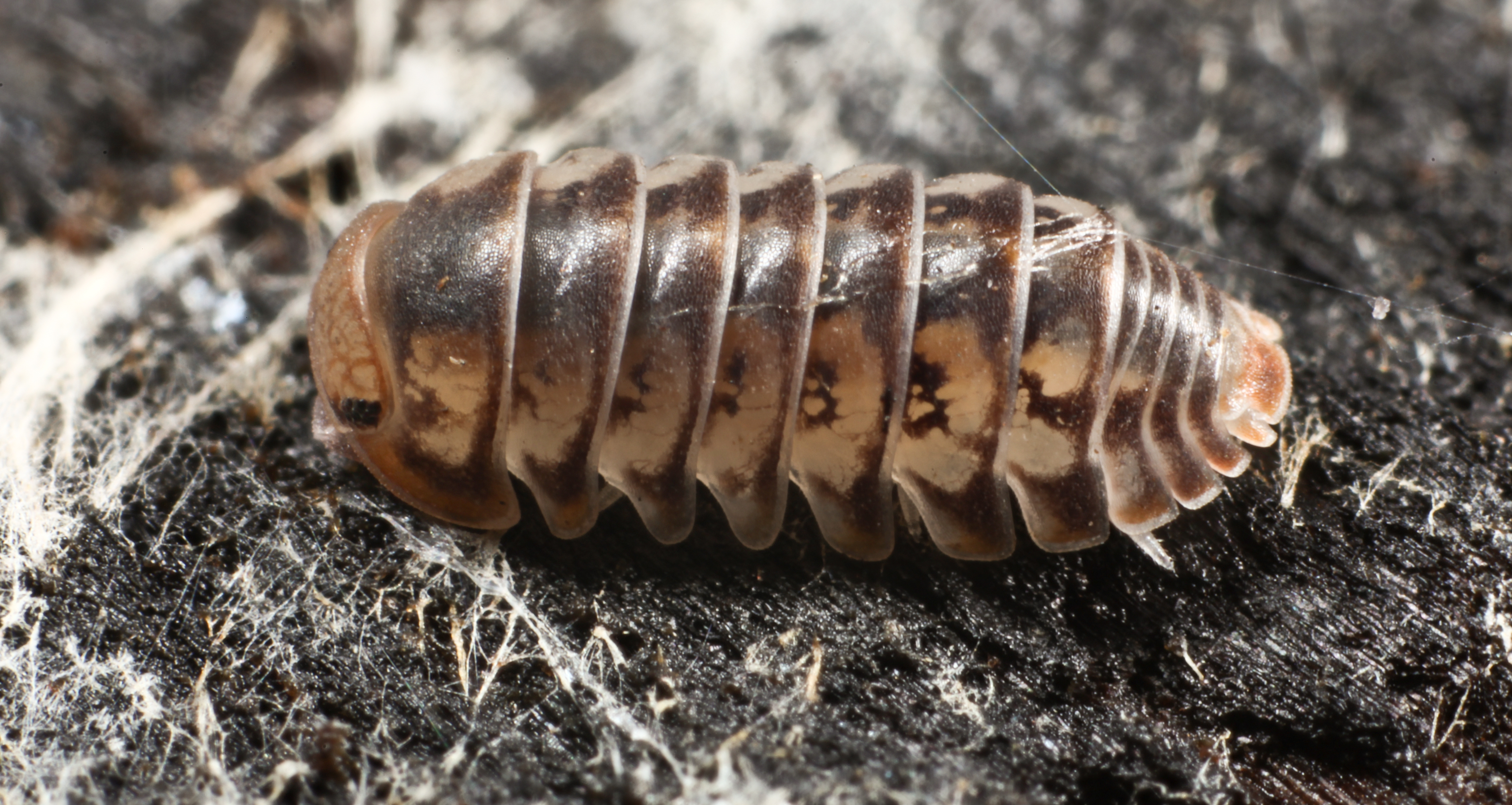
- Venezillo parvus

Scientific classification
- Kingdom: Animalia
- Phylum: Arthropoda
- Class: Malacostraca
- Order: Isopoda
- Suborder: Oniscidea
- Section: Crinocheta
- Family: Armadillidae; Brandt, 1831

Type genus
- Armadillo Duméril, 1816

Diversity
- c. 80 genera, 700 species

Synonyms
- Cubaridae Brandt, 1833

= Armadillidae =

Family of woodlice

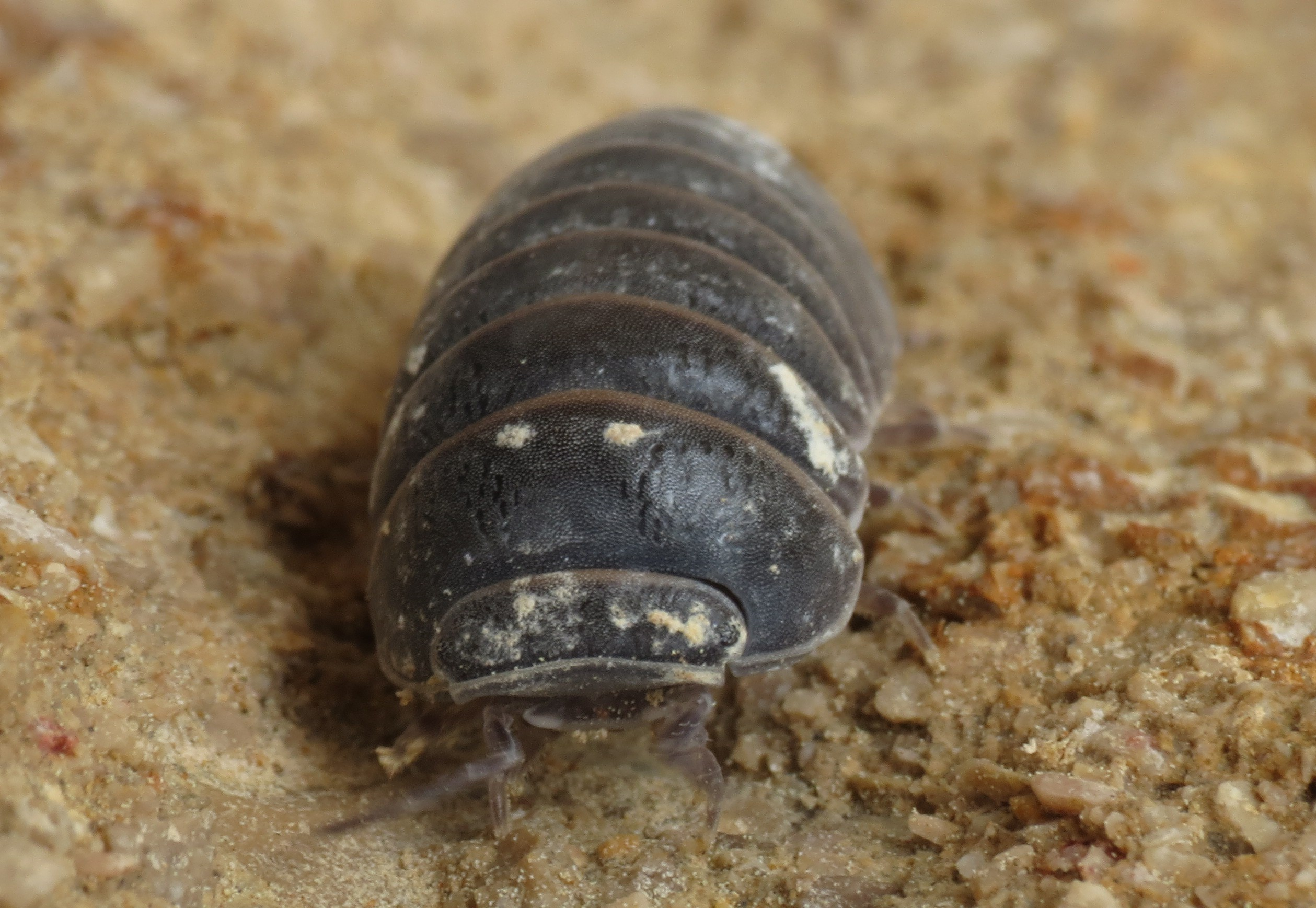
Armadillo officinalis, Spain

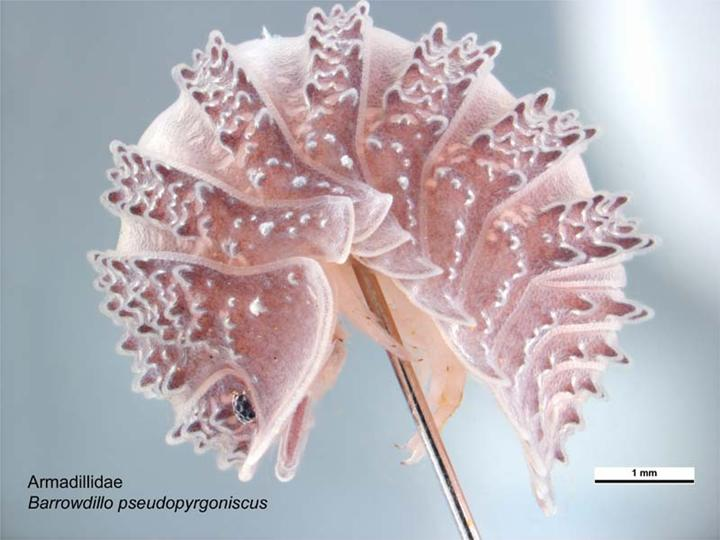
Barrowdillo pseudopyrgoniscus, Barrow Island, Australia

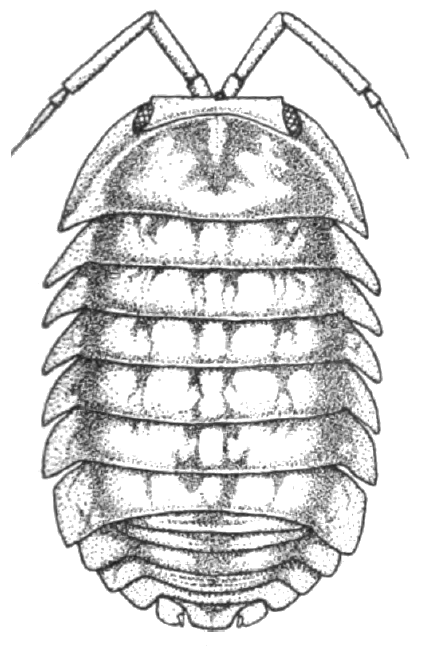
Cubaris insularis, Java, Indonesia

Armadillidae is a family of woodlice (Oniscidea; terrestrial crustaceans), comprising around 80 genera and 700 species. It is the largest family of Oniscidea, and one of the most species-rich families of the entire Isopoda. Most of the armadillid taxa are not monophyletic. Armadillids generally have a strongly convex body shape, with some rather shallowly convex. Like members of the woodlice family Armadillidiidae, armadillids are capable of enrolling into a sphere (conglobation), and are commonly known as pill bugs. Some species, however, have secondarily lost their conglobation ability. For example, a species exists in which the males lack the inner face of the coxal plates and are therefore unable to conglobate. Armadillids differ from the Armadillidiidae in that the antennae are fully enclosed within the sphere.

Species of Armadillidae occur in a variety of habitats including forests, savannas, and arid regions. Armadillids occur natively in the Afrotropics, Asia, Australia, the Neotropics, and the Mediterranean region of Europe. A few poorly-known species occur in North America north of Mexico, and some are introduced.

The family Armadillidae was erected by German naturalist Johann Friedrich von Brandt in 1831, although the earliest named genus now assigned to the family is Armadillo, described by French zoologist André Marie Constant Duméril in 1816. The German zoologist Karl Wilhelm Verhoeff described nearly one quarter of currently recognized genera (17).

== Genera ==
Each genus listed below is followed by the author citation, the biologist(s) who officially described the genus, and the year of its publication.

- Acanthodillo Verhoeff, 1926
- Acanthoniscus Kinahan, 1859
- Acutodillo Kästle & Regalado Fernández, 2025
- Aethiopodillo Verhoeff, 1942
- Akermania Collinge, 1919
- Anchicubaris Collinge, 1920
- Annobodillo Schmalfuss & Ferrara, 1983
- Anthrodillo Verhoeff, 1946
- Ardentiella Kästle & Regalado Fernández, 2025
- Armadillo Duméril, 1816
- Aulacodillo Verhoeff, 1942
- Australiodillo Verhoeff, 1926
- Barnardillo Arcangeli, 1934
- Barrowdillo Dalens, 1993
- Bethalus Budde-Lund, 1909
- Buddelundia Michaelsen, 1912
- Caledonillo Dalens, 1993
- Calmanesia Collinge, 1922
- Caribodillo Kästle, Binder, Jones & Coulis, 2025
- Chelomadillo Herold, 1931
- Coronadillo Vandel, 1977
- Cristarmadillo Arcangeli, 1950
- Ctenorillo Verhoeff, 1942
- Cubaris Brandt, 1834
- Cubaroides Vandel, 1973
- Cuckoldillo Lewis, 1998
- Diploexochus Brandt, 1833
- Dryadillo Taiti, Ferrara & Kwon, 1992
- Echinodillo Jackson, 1935
- Emydodillo Verhoeff, 1926
- Ethelumoris Richardson, 1907
- Feadillo Schmalfuss & Ferrara, 1983
- Filippinodillo Schmalfuss, 1987
- Floresiodillo Kästle & Regalado Fernández, 2025
- Formosillo Verhoeff, 1928
- Gabunillo Schmalfuss & Ferrara, 1983
- Hawaiodillo Verhoeff, 1926
- Hybodillo (Herold, 1931)
- Kimberleydillo Dalens, 1993
- Laureola Barnard, 1960
- Lobodillo Herold, 1931
- Madrasdillo Arcangeli, 1957
- Malaccadillo Arcangeli, 1957
- Merulana Budde-Lund, 1913
- Merulanella Verhoeff, 1926
- Mesodillo Verhoeff, 1926
- Myrmecodillo Arcangeli, 1934
- Nataldillo Verhoeff, 1942
- Neodillo Dalens, 1990
- Nesodillo Verhoeff, 1926
- Ochetodillo Verhoeff, 1926
- Orodillo Verhoeff, 1926
- Orthodillo Vandel, 1973
- Pachydillo Arcangeli, 1934
- Palaeoarmadillo George Poinar Jr, 2018
- Papuadillo Vandel, 1973
- Parakermania Vandel, 1973
- Parasphaerillo Arcangeli, 1934
- Paraxenodillo Schmalfuss & Ferrara, 1983
- Pericephalus Budde-Lund, 1909
- Polyacanthus Budde-Lund, 1909
- Pseudodiploexochus Arcangeli, 1934
- Pseudolaureola Kwon, Ferrara & Taiti, 1992
- Pseudolobodillo Schmalfuss & Ferrara, 1983
- Pseudosphaerillo Verhoeff, 1926
- Pyrgoniscus Kinahan, 1859
- Quatuordillo Taiti, 2014
- Reductoniscus Kesselyak, 1930
- Revelosa Kästle & Degenhardt, 2025
- Rhodesillo Ferrara & Taiti, 1978
- Riudillo Verhoeff, 1937
- Schismadillo Verhoeff, 1926
- Sinodillo Kwon & Taiti, 1993
- Sphaerillodillo Arcangeli, 1934
- Sphenodillo Lewis, 1998
- Spherillo Dana, 1853
- Stigmops Lillemets & Wilson, 2002
- Sumatrillo Herold, 1931
- Synarmadillo Dollfus, 1892
- Togarmadillo Schmalfuss & Ferrara, 1983
- Tongadillo Dalens, 1988
- Tridentodillo Jackson, 1933
- Troglodillo Jackson, 1937
- Tuberillo Schultz, 1982
- Venezillo Verhoeff, 1928
- Xestodillo Verhoeff, 1926
