= Cubaroides =

Scientific classification
- Kingdom: Animalia
- Phylum: Arthropoda
- Class: Malacostraca
- Order: Isopoda
- Suborder: Oniscidea
- Family: Armadillidae
- Genus: Cubaroides; Vandel, 1973
- Species: C. pilosus

Binomial name
- Cubaroides pilosus Vandel, 1973

Genus of woodlice

Cubaroides is a genus of woodlice belonging to the family Armadillidae. This genus was described in 1973 by Albert Vandel. The type specimen for this species is a Cubaroides pilosus from New South Wales, and it is the only species in this genus.

== Distribution ==
This genus has only been found in New South Wales, Australia. This genus has been found under and in wood in rainforests.

== Species ==
- Cubaroides pilosus Vandel, 1973
