= Aulacodillo =

Scientific classification
- Kingdom: Animalia
- Phylum: Arthropoda
- Class: Malacostraca
- Order: Isopoda
- Suborder: Oniscidea
- Family: Armadillidae
- Genus: Aulacodillo; Verhoeff, 1942
- Species: A. thomseni

Binomial name
- Aulacodillo thomseni (Panning, 1924)

Synonyms
- Aulacodillo omarurunus Verhoeff, 1942; Diploexochus thomseni Panning, 1924

Genus of woodlice

Aulacodillo is a genus of woodlice belonging to the family Armadillidae. This genus was described in 1942 by Karl Wilhelm Verhoeff. The type specimen for this species is an Aulacodillo thomseni from a farm in Namibia, and it is the only species in this genus.

== Description ==
Aulacodillo sp. have epimera with a longitudinal edge above and a deep longitudinal groove beside it. The marginal arch, delimited internally by the longitudinal edge, is twice as wide anteriorly as posteriorly. The longitudinal edge terminates at the end of the desepimeral word lobe and posteriorly at the schism. Their uropodendopodites that extend only to the middle of the posterior half of the telson, and this is 2.5 times wider. Their uropod endopodites extend almost as wide as they are long.

Based on the third to fifth thoracic segment and the obtusely angled edge at the bottom of the epimera of the seventh thoracic segment, this genus shows a very striking similarity to the genus Melanesillo.

== Distribution ==
This genus has only been found in Namibia.

== Species ==
Aulacodillo thomseni (Panning, 1924) = Aulacodillo omarurunus Verhoeff, 1942
