= Gabunillo =

Scientific classification
- Kingdom: Animalia
- Phylum: Arthropoda
- Clade: Pancrustacea
- Class: Malacostraca
- Order: Isopoda
- Suborder: Oniscidea
- Family: Armadillidae
- Genus: Gabunillo; Schmalfuss & Ferrara, 1983

Genus of woodlice

Gabunillo is a genus of woodlice belonging to the family Armadillidae. This genus was described in 1983 by Helmut Schamlfuss and Franco Ferrara. The type specimen for this species is a Gabunillo coecus from Lastoursville, Gabon. There are currently four species in this genus.

== Description ==
This genus is able to fully conglobate. They have steep epimera (lateral margins). They are small in size. They are pigmentless with eyes that are completely reduced. Their dorsal side has no granulations or tubercles, but does have scale-spines. Their cephalon has a frontal margin that is interrupted in the middle. Their first thoracic segment has a tiny groove along its margin. The inner and outer lobe of their schisma is rounded. The second and third thoracic segment has a transverse ridge on the ventral surface. Their telson is triangular. The pleopod exopodites do not have respiratory structures. Their uropod protopodite is rectangular and very small. They lack pseudotracheae, probably due to secondary reduction.

This genus is similar to Synarmadillo Dollfus, 1892. It differs in the structure of the cephalon, absence of ventral teeth on the second and third thoracic segments, and shape of the telson and uropods.

== Distribution ==
This genus was originally described from Gabon and has now had additional species described from Brazil and São Tomé.

== Species ==
- Gabunillo aridicola Souza, Senna & Kury, 2010
- Gabunillo coecus Schmalfuss & Ferrara, 1983
- Gabunillo enfurnado Campos-Filho, Sfenthourakis & Bichuette in Campos-Filho, Sfenthourakis, Gallo, Gallão, Torres, Chagas-Jr, Horta, Carpio-Díaz, López-Orozco, Borja-Arrieta, Araujo, Taiti & Bichuette, 2023
- Gabunillo thomensis Cifuentes & Da Silva, 2023
