= Floresiodillo =

Scientific classification
- Kingdom: Animalia
- Phylum: Arthropoda
- Clade: Pancrustacea
- Class: Malacostraca
- Order: Isopoda
- Suborder: Oniscidea
- Family: Armadillidae
- Genus: Floresiodillo; Kästle & Regalado Fernández, 2025

Genus of woodlice

Floresiodillo is a genus of woodlice belonging to the family Armadillidae. This genus was described in 2025 by Benedikt Kästle and Omar Rafael Regalado Fernández. The type specimen for this genus was originally described as Merulanella gibbera by Werner Herold in 1931.

== Description ==
The dorsal surface has small scale setae and with distinct tubercles. The epimera (lateral margins) of the pereon are almost horizontal. The cephalothorax has a frontal shield that protrudes above past the head and is lobe-like in front of eyes. The flagellum of the antennae have a second segment three times as long as the first segment.

The epimera of thoracic segments 1 and 2 have a small triangular "tooth", near the inner margin of the epimera. The epimera of thoracic segments 2-7 are rectangular. Their pleotelson is longer than it is wide, and has lateral margins that are weakly impressed. The posterior margin of pleotelson is straight or weakly concave. The protopodite of the uropod is long and slender, with a rounded distal portion. Their exopodite does not reach the posterior margin of the protopodite, and is inserted dorsally close to medial margin and covered basally by dorsomedial tooth. Their endopodite deos not reach the posterior margin of protopodite, and is longer than half the length of protopodite.

== Distribution ==
Both species of this genus have been found in Indonesia on the Island of Flores.

== Etymology ==
The genus name Floresiodillo is derived from the island of Flores, where both species in the genus were discovered.

== Species ==
- Floresiodillo gibberum (Herold, 1931)
- Floresiodillo latissimus (Herold, 1931)
