= Caledonillo =

Scientific classification
- Kingdom: Animalia
- Phylum: Arthropoda
- Class: Malacostraca
- Order: Isopoda
- Suborder: Oniscidea
- Family: Armadillidae
- Genus: Caledonillo

Genus of woodlice

Caledonillo is a genus of woodlice belonging to the family Armadillidae. This genus was described in 1993 by Henri Dalens. The type specimen for this species is a Caledonillo tillierorum from Mt. Panié, New Caledonia. There are currently two species in this genus.

== Distribution ==
This genus has only been found in New Caledonia.

== Species ==
- Caledonillo brunneus Dalens, 1993
- Caledonillo tillierorum Dalens, 1993
