= Acanthodillo =

Scientific classification
- Kingdom: Animalia
- Phylum: Arthropoda
- Clade: Pancrustacea
- Class: Malacostraca
- Order: Isopoda
- Suborder: Oniscidea
- Family: Armadillidae
- Genus: Acanthodillo; Verhoeff, 1926

Type species
- Acanthodillo erinaceus Verhoeff, 1926

Genus of woodlice

Acanthodillo is a genus of woodlice belonging to the family Armadillidae. This genus was described in 1926 by Karl Wilhelm Verhoeff. The type specimen for this species is Acanthodillo erinaceus from New Caledonia. As of January 2026, the genus contains 10 accepted species.

== Description ==
Acanthodillo have short, thick antennae with the flagellum attached off-center. The dorsal surface of the body is usually ornamented, with noticeable bumps, ridges, spines, and/or scale-like structures. The eyes are often small, typically made up of only a few facets. The epimera (side plates) of the first two pereon segments have distinct lobes, and the epimera of the following segments are split at the rear. The angle between the side plates and the pereon segments at the rear is sharp rather than rounded.

== Distribution ==
Acanthodillo isopods have been found in Australia, New Caledonia, and New Zealand.

== Species ==
Acanthodillo contains the following species:

- Acanthodillo agasketos Lewis, 1998
- Acanthodillo barringtonensis Lewis, 1998
- Acanthodillo brevicornis Budde-Lund, 1913
- Acanthodillo commensalis Baker, 1913
- Acanthodillo erinaceus Verhoeff, 1926
- Acanthodillo formicarum Vandel, 1973
- Acanthodillo kioloa Lewis, 1998
- Acanthodillo minutus Baker, 1913
- Acanthodillo spinosus Dana, 1853 (originally designated as Sphaerillo spinosus)
- Acanthodillo tuberosus Wahrberg, 1922
