= Lobodillo =

Scientific classification
- Kingdom: Animalia
- Phylum: Arthropoda
- Class: Malacostraca
- Order: Isopoda
- Suborder: Oniscidea
- Family: Armadillidae
- Genus: Lobodillo; Taiti, Paoli & Ferrara, 1998

Genus of woodlice

Lobodillo is a genus of woodlice belonging to the family Armadillidae. This genus was first described in 1931 by Werner Herold. The genus was not officially described until 1998 by Stefano Taiti, Pasquino Paoli, and Franco Ferrera. The type specimen for this species is a Lobodillo flavus from Baturiti. There are currently ten species in this genus.

== Description ==
Lobodillo sp. have ventral lobes linked to their ability to conglobate that are present on all pereonites and pleonites. They also have monospiracular covered lungs, which is common for Armadillidae.

== Distribution ==
This genus has been found on numerous islands in Oceania and the surrounding area including Australia, Fiji, Indonesia, Marshall Islands, New Guinea, Samoa, Solomon Islands, and Tonga. Some species have also been found in southern Africa including in Namibia and South Africa.

== Species ==
- Lobodillo aerarius (Barnard, 1937)
- Lobodillo atrogrisescens (Wahrberg, 1922)
- Lobodillo badius (Herold, 1931)
- Lobodillo flavus (Herold, 1931)
- Lobodillo hebridarum (Verhoeff, 1926)
- Lobodillo hunti Vandel, 1973
- Lobodillo lentus (Budde-Lund, 1904)
- Lobodillo parvipannosus (Herold, 1931)
- Lobodillo renschii (Herold, 1931)
- Lobodillo salomonis Vandel, 1973
