= Togarmadillo =

Scientific classification
- Kingdom: Animalia
- Phylum: Arthropoda
- Class: Malacostraca
- Order: Isopoda
- Suborder: Oniscidea
- Family: Armadillidae
- Genus: Togarmadillo; Schmalfuss & Ferrara, 1983

Genus of woodlice

Togarmadillo is a genus of woodlice belonging to the family Armadillidae. This genus was described in 1983 by Helmut Schmalfuss and Franco Ferrera. The type specimen for this species is a Togarmadillo nigropunctatus from Bismarckburg, Togo. There are currently two species in this genus.

== Description ==
This genus is able to conglobate. Their dorsal side does not have bumps or spines. Their head has a pronounced triangular frontal protrusion with the frontal line missing. The hind corner of the epimera (side plate) on their first pereon segment has a schisma, and the inner and outer lobes are subequal; this schisma continues frontally into a groove for about half the length of the epimeron which is thickened laterally. The epimera of the second and third pereon segments have small ventral endolobi (small, ventral lobe-like structures on the underside of the epimera). The epimera of the fifth pleon segment is strongly convergent. Their telson is triangular with concave sides and a pointed apex. All five of their pleopod exopodites have well-developed pseudotracheae.

== Distribution ==
This genus has been found in Cameroon and Togo.

== Species ==
- Togarmadillo monocellatus Ferrara & Schmalfuss, 1983
- Togarmadillo nigropunctatus (Hilgendorf, 1893) syn. Periscyphis nigropunctatus, Synarmadillo nigropunctatus
