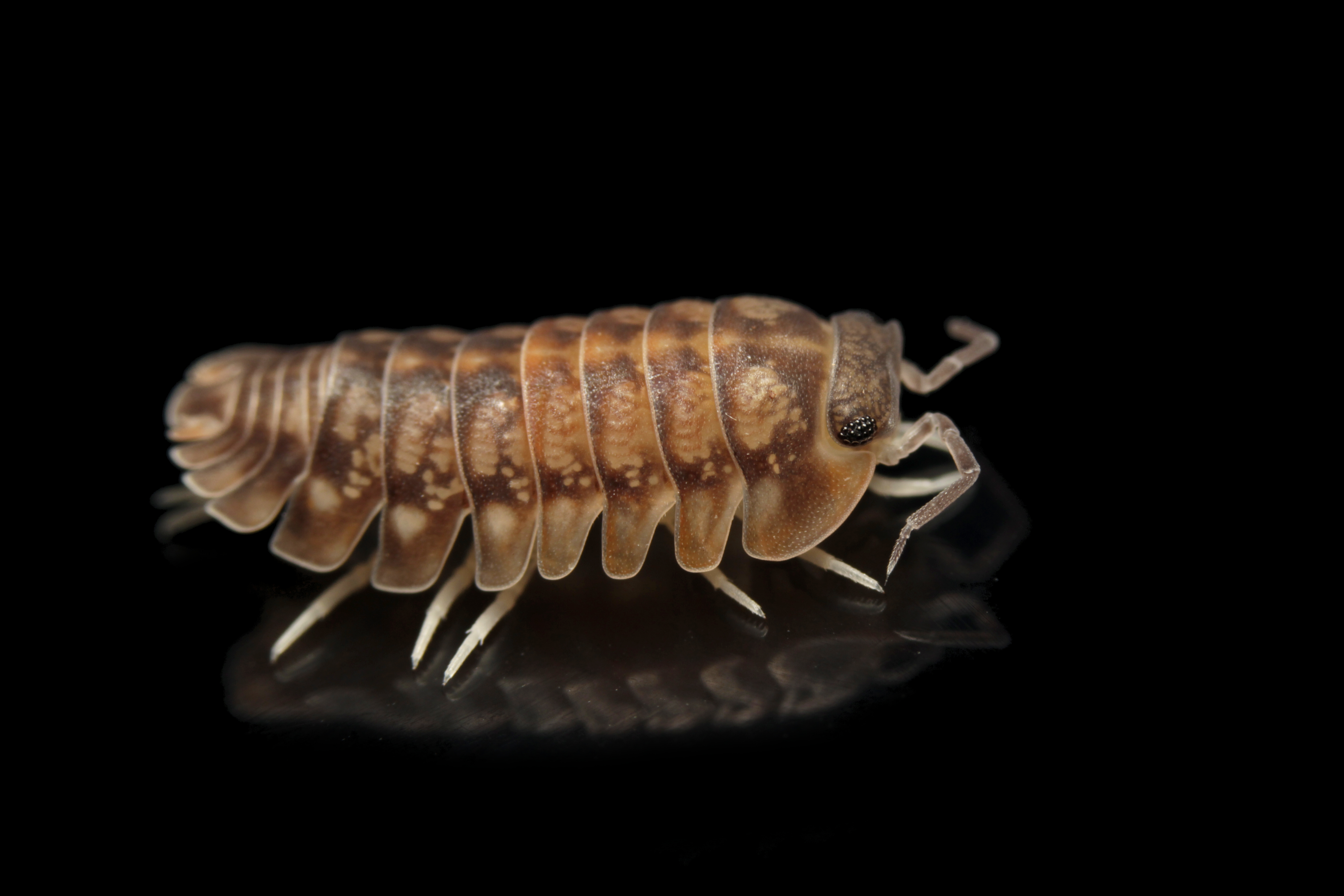
- Formosillo zimmeri

Scientific classification
- Kingdom: Animalia
- Phylum: Arthropoda
- Class: Malacostraca
- Order: Isopoda
- Suborder: Oniscidea
- Family: Armadillidae
- Genus: Formosillo; Verhoeff, 1928
- Species: F. zimmeri

Binomial name
- Formosillo zimmeri Verhoeff, 1928

= Formosillo =

Genus of woodlice

Formosillo is a genus of woodlice belonging to the family Armadillidae. This genus was described in 1928 by Karl Wilhelm Verhoeff. The type specimen for this species is a Formosillo zimmeri from Taiwan and it is currently the only species in this genus.

== Distribution ==
This genus has only been found in Taiwan.

== Species ==
- Formosillo zimmeri Verhoeff, 1928

=== Former species ===
- Formososcia ocellata Verhoeff, 1928 = Burmoniscus ocellata
- Formosillo raffaelei (Arcangeli, 1927) = Spherillo raffaelei
