= Emydodillo =

Scientific classification
- Kingdom: Animalia
- Phylum: Arthropoda
- Class: Malacostraca
- Order: Isopoda
- Suborder: Oniscidea
- Family: Armadillidae
- Genus: Emydodillo; Verhoeff, 1926

Genus of crustaceans

Emydodillo is a genus of woodlice belonging to the family Armadillidae. This genus was described in 1926 by Karl Wilhelm Verhoeff. The type specimen for this species is a Emydodillo testudo from New Caledonia, and it is the only species in this genus.

== Distribution ==
This genus has only been found in Ignambi Forest in New Caledonia.

== Species ==
- Emydodillo testudo Verhoeff, 1926
