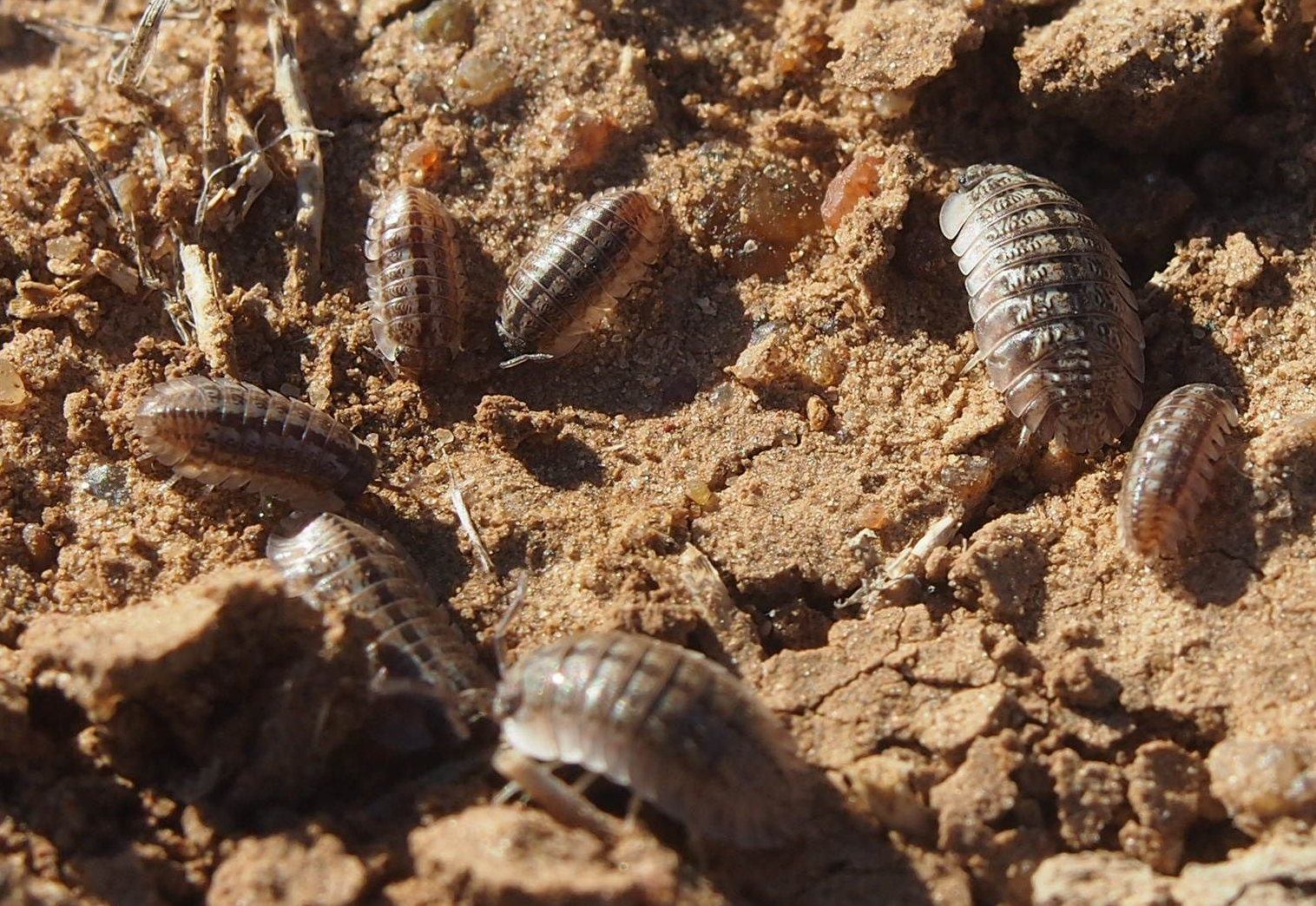
- Australiodillo bifrons

Scientific classification
- Kingdom: Animalia
- Phylum: Arthropoda
- Class: Malacostraca
- Order: Isopoda
- Suborder: Oniscidea
- Family: Armadillidae
- Genus: Australiodillo

= Australiodillo =

Genus of woodlice

Australiodillo is a genus of woodlice belonging to the family Armadillidae. The type specimen for this genus was originally described as Armadillo bifrons in 1885 by Gustav Budde-Lund. This specimen was then redescribed as Australiodillo bifrons in 1926 by Karl Wilhelm Verhoeff. This specimen was collected in Rockhampton. There are currently nine species in this genus.

== Description ==
Australiodillo sp. have a flattened body, with no ventral lobes, and are unable to conglobate. Their telson is notched on its posterior margin.

== Distribution ==
This genus has been found in Australia and New Caledonia.

== Species ==
- Australiodillo anomalus Lewis, 1998
- Australiodillo armus Lewis, 1998
- Australiodillo bifrons (Budde-Lund, 1885)
- Australiodillo haplophthalmoides Dalens, 1993
- Australiodillo insularis Vandel, 1973
- Australiodillo mucosus Lewis, 1998
- Australiodillo neocaledoniensis Dalens, 1993
- Australiodillo primitivus Vandel, 1973
- Australiodillo setosus Lewis, 1998
