= Dryadillo =

Scientific classification
- Kingdom: Animalia
- Phylum: Arthropoda
- Clade: Pancrustacea
- Class: Malacostraca
- Order: Isopoda
- Suborder: Oniscidea
- Family: Armadillidae
- Genus: Dryadillo

Genus of woodlice

Dryadillo is a genus of woodlice belonging to the family Armadillidae. This genus was described in 1992 by Stefano Taiti, Franco Ferrera, and Do Heon Kwon. The type specimen for this species is a Dryadillo baliensis (Herold, 1931) from Baturiti. There are currently 18 species in this genus.

== Description ==
Dryadillo sp. have a cephalon with a frontal lamina (head shield) that does not protrude past the end of the cephalon. The epimera (side plates) of their first segment do not have a thickened margin and their postlateral corner has a shallow cleft with the inner lobe much shorter than the outer one. The epimera of their second segment have a semicircular ventral lobe.

Their telson has a conical shape and their uropod has a dorsal medial tooth and short exopod.

== Distribution ==
This genus has been found in China, Hong Kong, Indonesia, Macau, Taiwan, and Vietnam. Several species appear to be endemic to islands in Indonesia. Some species in this genus are cave-dwelling and have troglomorphic traits.

== Species ==
- Dryadillo arcangelii (Herold, 1931)
- Dryadillo baliensis (Herold, 1931)
- Dryadillo bedaliensis (Herold, 1931)
- Dryadillo chengziensis Dai & Cai, 1998
- Dryadillo feuerborni (Herold, 1931)
- Dryadillo guizhouensis Taiti & Gruber, 2008
- Dryadillo hebereri (Herold, 1931)
- Dryadillo jinghongensis Dai & Cai, 1998
- Dryadillo kemaensis Taiti, Ferrara & Kwon, 1992
- Dryadillo longiantenna Le & Tran, 2025
- Dryadillo maculatus (Arcangeli, 1952)
- Dryadillo magnificus (Herold, 1931)
- Dryadillo montanus (Herold, 1931)
- Dryadillo parviocellatus Taiti & Gruber, 2008
- Dryadillo rectifrons (Dollfus, 1898)
- Dryadillo schellenbergi (Herold, 1931)
- Dryadillo sexlineatus (Herold, 1931)
- Dryadillo uenoi Nunomura, 1995
