= Orodillo =

Scientific classification
- Kingdom: Animalia
- Phylum: Arthropoda
- Clade: Pancrustacea
- Class: Malacostraca
- Order: Isopoda
- Suborder: Oniscidea
- Family: Armadillidae
- Genus: Orodillo; Verhoeff, 1926

Genus of woodlice

Orodillo is a genus of woodlice belonging to the family Armadillidae. This genus was described in 1926 by Karl Wilhelm Verhoeff. The type specimen for this species is a Orodillo collaris from Ignambi forest, New Caledonia. There are currently two species in this genus.

== Description ==
Orodillo have a low frontal lamina (face shield) that does not project into lobes or tubercles. Their first to sixth pereon segments are notched on each side. The posterior margin of their pereon segments, especially the anterior ones, have a transverse groove with a transverse ridge in front of it. They do not have lateral nodules. Their uropod exopodites are elongated but do not reach the posterior margin of the propodite.

== Distribution ==
This genus has been found in the Oceania region in New Caledonia and Taiwan.

== Species ==
- Orodillo collaris Verhoeff, 1926
- Orodillo sauteri Verhoeff, 1928

=== Former species ===
- Orodillo maculatus (Arcangeli, 1952) = Dryadillo maculatus (Arcangeli, 1952)
