= Rhodesillo =

Scientific classification
- Kingdom: Animalia
- Phylum: Arthropoda
- Clade: Pancrustacea
- Class: Malacostraca
- Order: Isopoda
- Suborder: Oniscidea
- Family: Armadillidae
- Genus: Rhodesillo; Ferrara & Taiti, 1978

Genus of woodlice

Rhodesillo is a genus of woodlice belonging to the family Armadillidae. This genus was described in 1978 by Franco Ferrera and Stefano Taiti. The type specimen for this genus is a Rhodesillo sulcifrons from Mt. Selinda, Zimbabwe. There are currently two species in this genus.

== Description ==
The cuticle of this genus has small triangular scale-spines. Additionally, their cephalon, pereon, pleon and telson have prominent bumps. Their cephalon has a deep frontal groove and a ridge that protrudes past the end of the head. Their ocelli are not traceable. Their first pereonal segment is deeply grooved on its lateral margin. Their second pereon segment has a transverse ventral tooth. The epimera (side plates) of the third to seventh pereon segments and of the third to fifth pleon segments are vertical and not thickened ventrally. Their telson has short, rectangular distal part with a truncate apex. They have short antennae. Their uropod protopodite is trapezoidal, with no visible exopodite. They have five pairs of pleopods, all with exopodites that have respiratory areas.

== Distribution ==
This genus has been found in Equatorial Guinea on Fernando Poo and in Zimbabwe on Mount Selinda.

== Species ==
- Rhodesillo insulanus Schmalfuss & Ferrara, 1983
- Rhodesillo sulcifrons Ferrara & Taiti, 1978
