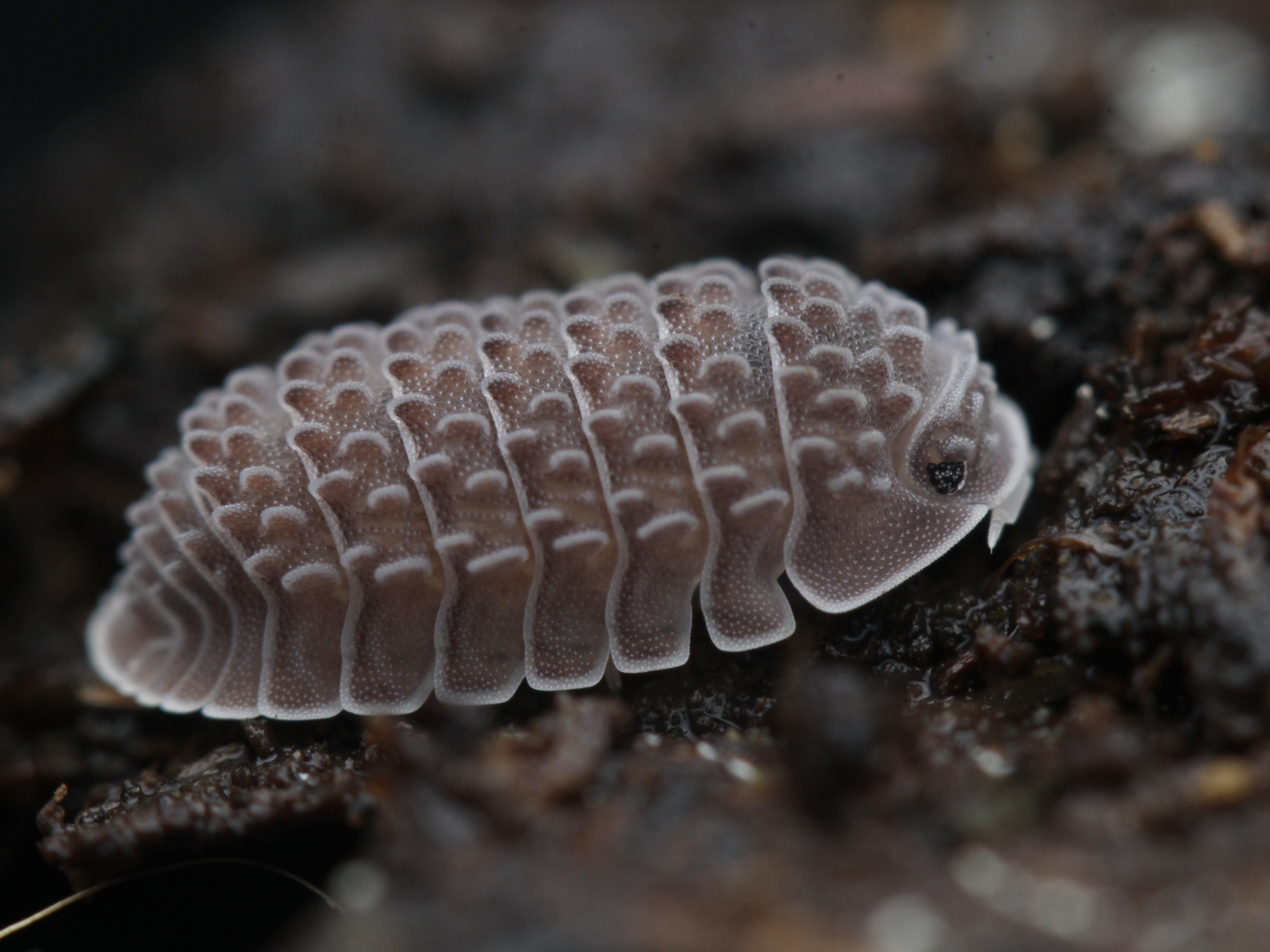
- Ctenorillo guinensis

Scientific classification
- Kingdom: Animalia
- Phylum: Arthropoda
- Class: Malacostraca
- Order: Isopoda
- Suborder: Oniscidea
- Family: Armadillidae
- Genus: Ctenorillo; Verhoeff, 1942

Type species
- Ctenorillo buddelundi Verhoeff, 1942

Synonyms
- Diploexochus Arcangeli, 1941; Tuberdillo Schmalfuss & Ferrara, 1983; Vandelillo Arcangeli, 1957; Venezillo Schmalfuss & Ferrara, 1983

= Ctenorillo =

Genus of woodlice

Ctenorillo is a genus of woodlouse in the family Armadillidae.

== Species ==
The genus contains the following species:

- Ctenorillo araguaia Cardoso & Ferreira in Cardoso, Bento & Ferreira, 2024
- Ctenorillo atlanticus Cifuentes & Da Silva, 2023
- Ctenorillo ausseli (Dollfus, 1893)
- Ctenorillo bananae (Van Name, 1920)
- Ctenorillo binomio Carpio-Díaz, Bichuette & Campos-Filho, 2023
- Ctenorillo dazai Carpio-Díaz, López-Orozco & Campos-Filho, 2018
- Ctenorillo fagei (Paulian de Felice, 1941)
- Ctenorillo ferrarai Campos-Filho, Araujo & Taiti in Campos-Filho, Araujo, Bichuette, Trajano & Taiti, 2014
- Ctenorillo gabunensis (Schmalfuss & Ferrara, 1983)
- Ctenorillo guinensis (Schmalfuss & Ferrara, 1983)
- Ctenorillo humboldti Carpio-Díaz, López-Orozco & Campos-Filho, 2023
- Ctenorillo intertidalis Cardoso & Ferreira in Cardoso, Bento & Ferreira, 2024
- Ctenorillo iuiuensis Cardoso & Ferreira in Cardoso, Bento & Ferreira, 2024
- Ctenorillo jequitinhonha Cardoso & Ferreira in Cardoso, Bento & Ferreira, 2024
- Ctenorillo kenyensis Schmölzer, 1974
- Ctenorillo legai (Arcangeli, 1941)
- Ctenorillo meyeri Taiti, 2018
- Ctenorillo mincaensis López-Orozco, Carpio-Díaz & Campos-Filho, 2023
- Ctenorillo mineri (Van Name, 1936)
- Ctenorillo orientalis Carpio-Díaz, Taiti & López-Orozco, 2023
- Ctenorillo papagayoensis Carpio-Díaz, Borja-Arrieta & Campos-Filho, 2023
- Ctenorillo parituberculatus (Taiti & Ferrara, 1987)
- Ctenorillo pelado Cardoso & Ferreira in Cardoso, Bento & Ferreira, 2024
- Ctenorillo potiguar Cardoso & Ferreira in Cardoso, Bento & Ferreira, 2024
- Ctenorillo quiteriensis Cardoso & Ferreira in Cardoso, Bento & Ferreira, 2024
- Ctenorillo regulus (Van Name, 1920)
- Ctenorillo strinatii (Schmalfuss & Ferrara, 1983)
- Ctenorillo tayrona López-Orozco, Borja-Arrieta & Campos-Filho, 2023
- Ctenorillo tuberosus (Budde-Lund, 1904)
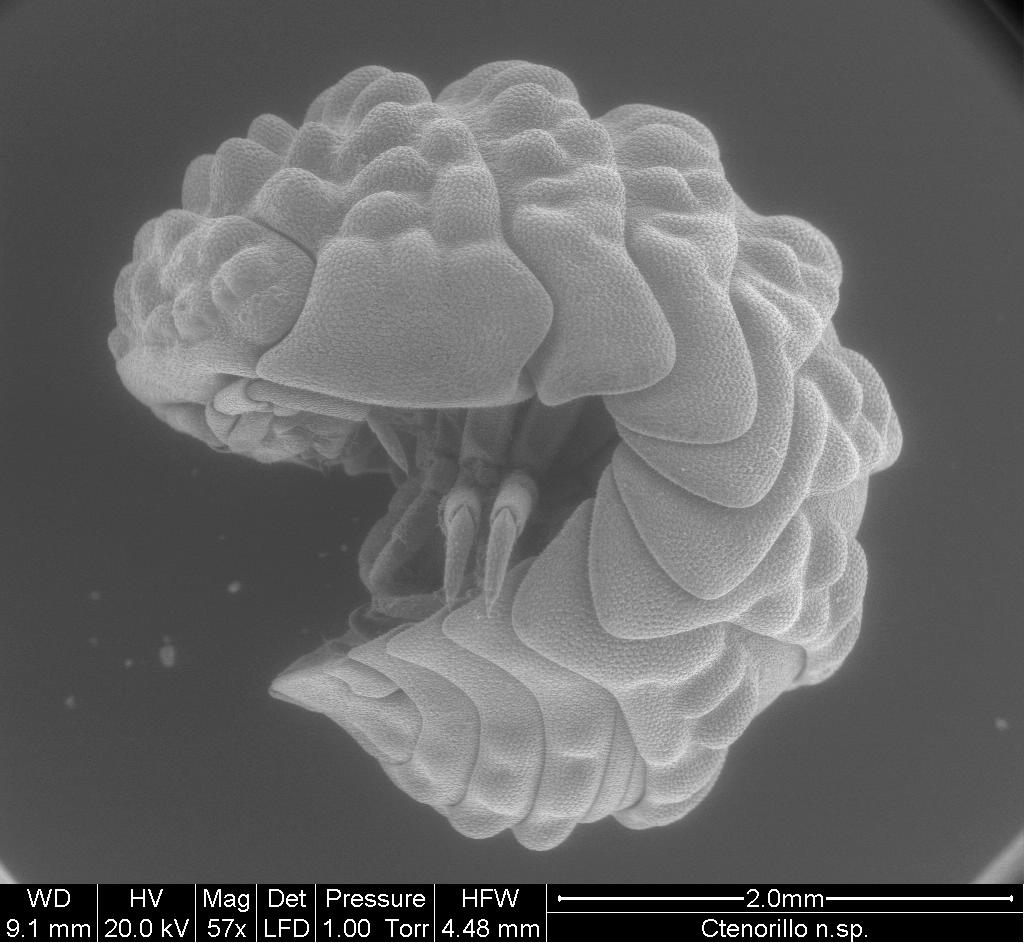
- Ctenorillo meyeri
  Ctenorillo ubajarensis Cardoso & Ferreira in Cardoso, Bento & Ferreira, 2024
