= Tuberillo =

Scientific classification
- Kingdom: Animalia
- Phylum: Arthropoda
- Clade: Pancrustacea
- Class: Malacostraca
- Order: Isopoda
- Suborder: Oniscidea
- Family: Armadillidae
- Genus: Tuberillo; Schultz, 1982

Genus of woodlice

Tuberillo is a genus of woodlice belonging to the family Armadillidae. This genus was described in 1982 by George A. Schultz. The type specimen for this species is T. sarawakensis from the Mulu Caves in Borneo. There are currently at least 7 species in this genus.

== Description ==
Tuberillo isopods can fully conglobate. The epimera (side plates) of the body segments are slightly curved outward. The dorsal surface of the body is covered with clearly visible bumps. Each pereon segment has a single row of small nodules on each side. The head has a large frontal shield that clearly projects past the end of the head. The first pereon segment has a notch at the rear corner, with the inner part extending to or beyond the outer part. The second body segment has a large ventral lobe that is angled diagonally downward. Their telson is hourglass-shaped or has a square-shaped tip. The antennae are short and thick. Several of the abdominal appendages have exposed respiratory structures. The uropods are small, with a very reduced outer branch.

=== Remarks on similar genera ===
The genus Tuberillo appears morphologically similar to the Neotropical and Afrotropical genus Ctenorillo (Verhoeff 1942) but differs in having pleopods with uncovered lungs instead of monospiracular covered lungs.

== Distribution ==
Tuberillo isopods have been found in Indonesia, Malaysia, Philippines.

== Species ==
The following species are assigned to this genus:

- Tuberillo borneanus Taiti & Gruber, 2010
- Tuberillo cebuensis Taiti & Gruber, 2010
- Tuberillo celebensis Taiti, Ferrara & Kwon, 1992
- Tuberillo jubatus (Herold, 1931)
- Tuberillo riedeli Taiti & Gruber, 2010
- Tuberillo sarawakensis Schultz, 1982
- Tuberillo schawalleri Taiti & Gruber, 2010
