= Calmanesia =

Scientific classification
- Kingdom: Animalia
- Phylum: Arthropoda
- Class: Malacostraca
- Order: Isopoda
- Suborder: Oniscidea
- Family: Armadillidae
- Genus: Calmanesia; Collinge, 1922

Genus of woodlice

Calmanesia is a genus of woodlice belonging to the family Armadillidae. This genus was described in 1922 by Walter Edward Collinge. The type specimen for this species is a Calmanesia methueni from the Forest of Folohoy in eastern Madagascar. There are currently four species in this genus.

== Description ==
Calmanesia sp. have a spiny dorsum and a triangular telson.

== Distribution ==
This genus has only been found on Madagascar.

== Species ==
- Calmanesia erinaceus Barnard, 1958
- Calmanesia horrida (Budde-Lund, 1908)
- Calmanesia lonchotes Barnard, 1960
- Calmanesia methueni Collinge, 1922
