= Neodillo =

Scientific classification
- Kingdom: Animalia
- Phylum: Arthropoda
- Class: Malacostraca
- Order: Isopoda
- Suborder: Oniscidea
- Family: Armadillidae
- Genus: Neodillo; Dalens, 1990

Genus of woodlice

Neodillo is a genus of woodlice belonging to the family Armadillidae. This genus was described in 1990 by Henri Dalens. The type specimen for this species is a Neodillo simplex from Western Province, Papua New Guinea. There are currently two species in this genus.

== Description ==
Neodillo have a flattened body, with no ventral lobes, and are unable to conglobate.

== Distribution ==
This genus has been found on the islands of Papua New Guinea and New Caledonia.

== Species ==
- Neodillo chazeaui Dalens, 1993
- Neodillo simplex Dalens, 1990
