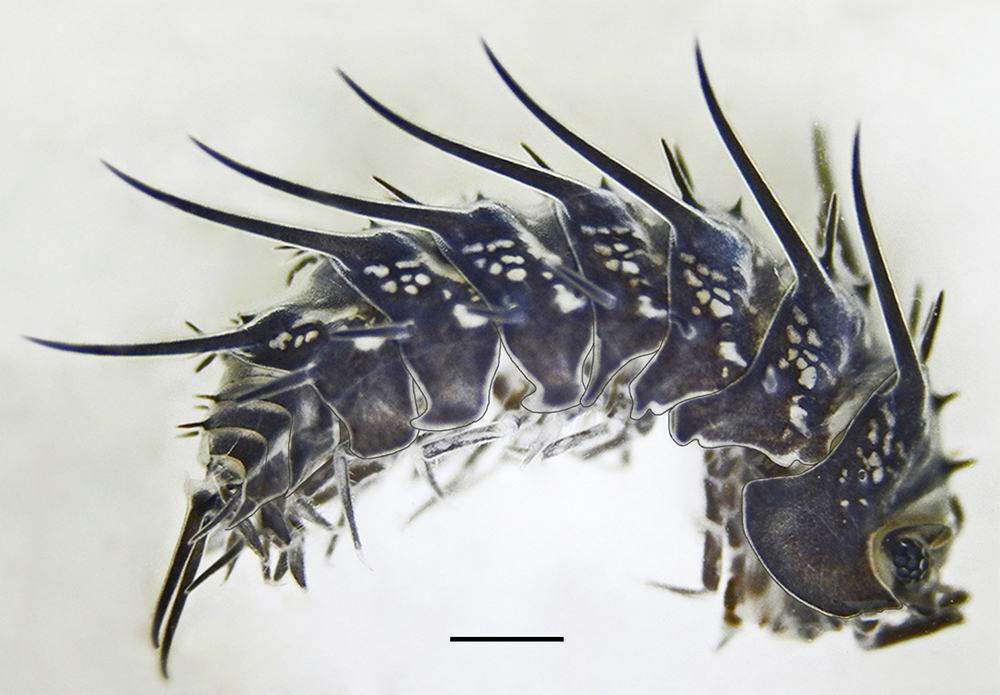

Scientific classification
- Kingdom: Animalia
- Phylum: Arthropoda
- Clade: Pancrustacea
- Class: Malacostraca
- Order: Isopoda
- Suborder: Oniscidea
- Family: Armadillidae
- Genus: Acanthoniscus; Gosse, 1851

Species
- Acanthoniscus richardsonae Rodríguez-Cabrera & de Armas, 2023; Acanthoniscus spiniger Gosse, 1851

= Acanthoniscus =

Genus of woodlice

Acanthoniscus is a genus of woodlice belonging to the family Armadillidae. This genus was described in 1851 by Philip Henry Gosse. The type species is Acanthoniscus spiniger from Jamaica and it is currently stored in the collection of The Natural History Museum, London. There are currently 2 species in this genus.

== Description ==
=== Head ===
Their cephalothorax has an irregular upper margin of its frontal shield, forming lateral and median lobes (not antennal lobes). The front of their cephalothorax has a wide shallow depressions on each side divided by very low median ridge holding their second antennae. The dorsal surface of the head has small spine-like tubercles and/or medium-sized, club-like spines. Their eyes are composed of 16 ommatidia. Their first antenna are 3-jointed. Their second antenna are long and slender. The flagellum of their antennae are 2-jointed and have 2 groups of sensory setae on the tip.

=== Body ===
The body of Acanthoniscus "[appears] fragile". They are able to fully conglobate. Their epimera (side plates) are enlarged and fused with the dorsal surface of their body. The dorsal surface of the pereon segments are covered with long, slightly curving dorsolateral spines and smaller posteromedian and lateral spines. There are additional spine-like tubercles on their second to seventh pereon segments that are directed forward. The epimera (side plate) on their first pereon segment is enlarged and rounded. The epimera on their second to seventh pereon segments have a pointed, and outwardly extended corner.

=== Pleon ===
The dorsal side of their third and fourth pleon segments have a pair of small spines or spine-like tubercles. The side plates of their third to fifth pleon segments are enlarged. Their pleotelson is “hourglass-shaped,” with the base wider than the distal part. Two long dorsal spines 1.3 - 1.5x as long as the pleotelson extend off the end of the body. The base of their uropod is asymmetric and dorsoventrally flattened; it fills the gap between the pleotelson and fifth pleon side plate. Their uropod is broader at its base and has a concave and irregular medial margin. Their uropod is pointed and its endopodite is laterally compressed. Their uropod exopodite is extremely long, narrow, and slightly curved. Their pleopods have single spiracle lungs.

=== Legs ===
Their fifth leg segment has a simple, straight to curved dactylar seta, inner claw, sickle-shaped ungual seta and other smaller setae.

== Distribution ==
This genus has only been found in Jamaica.

== Species ==
- Acanthoniscus richardsonae Rodríguez-Cabrera & de Armas, 2023
- Acanthoniscus spiniger Gosse, 1851

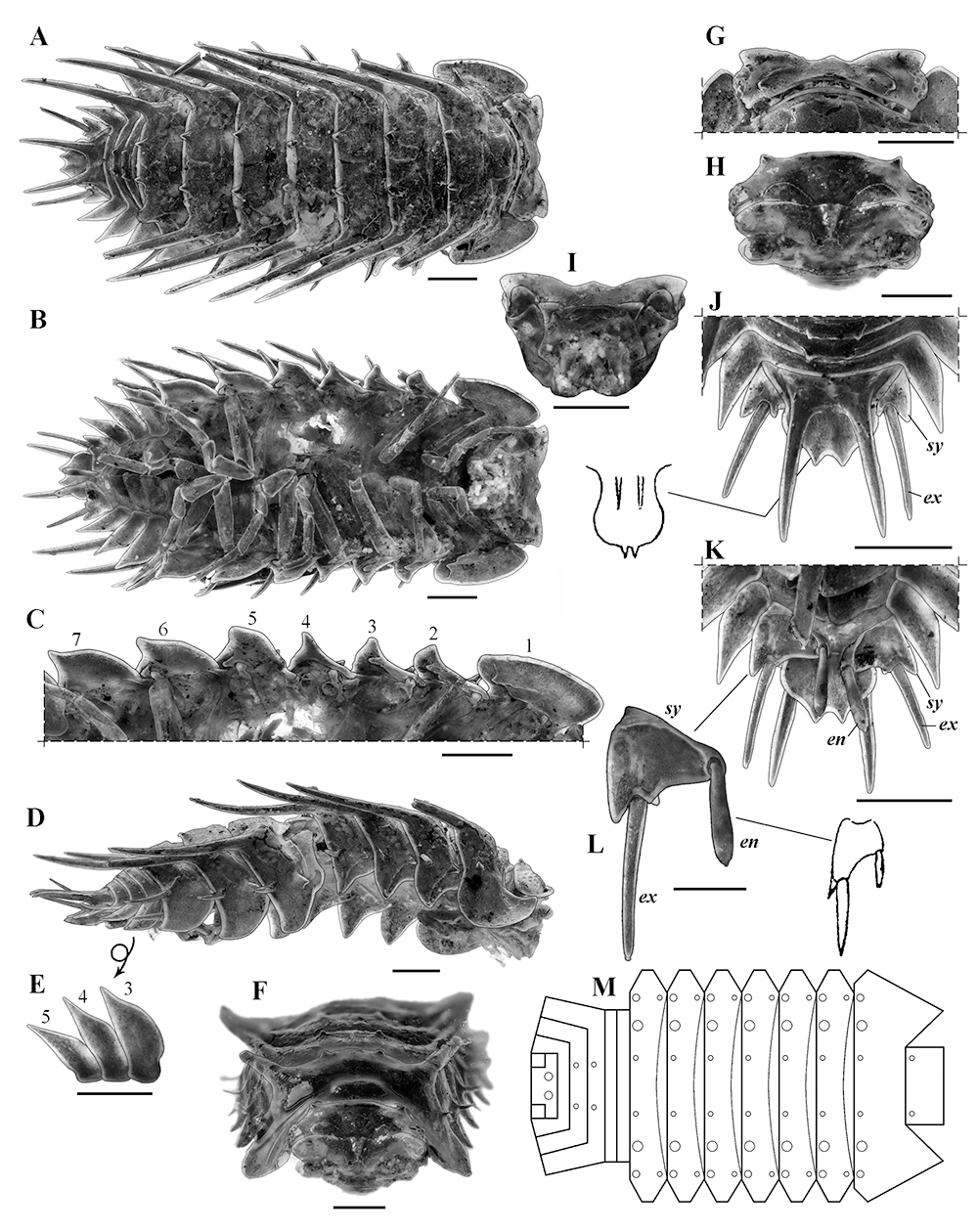
Body parts of Acanthoniscus spiniger (female holotype BMNH 1973.478.1). A, Overall, dorsal view; B, overall, ventral view; C, right pereon-epimera 1-7 in ventral view; D, overall, lateral view; E, right pleon-epimera 3-5 in ventral view ; F, overall, frontal view; G, cephalothorax in dorsal view; H, cephalothorax in frontal view; I, cephalothorax in ventral view; J, pleotelson and uropods in dorsal view ; K, pleotelson and uropods in ventral view; L, right uropod in ventral view; M, arrangement of dorsal spines, the diameters of the circles correspond to the relative size of the spines. Drawings of the corresponding structures modified from Kinahan (1859) are included in J and L. Abbreviations: sympodite (sy), endopodite (en), and exopodite (ex). Scale bars = 1 mm (A-K), 0.5 mm (L).
