= List of Venezillo species =

This is a list of 140 species in Venezillo, a genus of woodlice in the family Armadillidae.

== Venezillo species ==
- Venezillo aenigma (Barnard, 1932)^{i c g}
- Venezillo agataensis (Nunomura, 1991)^{c g}
- Venezillo aguayoi (Boone, 1934)^{i c g}
- Venezillo alberti (Barnard, 1932)^{i c g}
- Venezillo albescens (Budde-Lund, 1909)^{i c g}
- Venezillo albus (Nunomura, 1990)^{c g}
- Venezillo alticola (Barnard, 1932)^{i c g}
- Venezillo apacheus (S. Mulaik and D. Mulaik, 1942)^{i c g}
- Venezillo arizonicus (S. Mulaik & D. Mulaik, 1942)^{i c g b}
- Venezillo articulatus Mulaik, 1960^{i c g}
- Venezillo beebei (Van Name, 1924)^{i c g}
- Venezillo bellavistanus Schultz, 1995^{i c g}
- Venezillo berlandi (Paulian de Felice, 1940)^{i c g}
- Venezillo bituberculatus (Budde-Lund, 1910)^{i c g}
- Venezillo bolivianus (Dollfus, 1897)^{i c g}
- Venezillo boneti Mulaik, 1960^{i c g}
- Venezillo boninensis (Nunomura, 1990)^{c g}
- Venezillo booneae (Van Name, 1936)^{i c g}
- Venezillo brevipalma Nunomura, 2003^{c g}
- Venezillo brevispinis (Pearse, 1915)^{i c g}
- Venezillo cacahuampilensis (Bilimek, 1867)^{i c g}
- Venezillo californicus (Budde-Lund, 1885)^{i}
- Venezillo canariensis (Dollfus, 1893)^{i c g}
- Venezillo castor (Barnard, 1932)^{i c g}
- Venezillo celsicauda (Barnard, 1932)^{i c g}
- Venezillo chamberlini (S. Mulaik and D. Mulaik, 1942)^{i c g}
- Venezillo chiapensis Rioja, 1955^{i c g}
- Venezillo clausus (Budde-Lund, 1885)^{i c g}
- Venezillo colomboi (Arcangeli, 1930)^{i c g}
- Venezillo coloratus (Barnard, 1932)^{i c g}
- Venezillo congener (Budde-Lund, 1904)^{i c g}
- Venezillo crassus (Budde-Lund, 1904)^{i c g}
- Venezillo culebrae (Van Name, 1936)^{i c g}
- Venezillo daitoensis (Nunomura, 1990)^{c g}
- Venezillo disjunctus (Barnard, 1932)^{i c g}
- Venezillo dollfusi (Barnard, 1932)^{i c g}
- Venezillo donanensis (Nunomura, 1992)^{c g}
- Venezillo dugesi (Dollfus, 1896)^{i c g}
- Venezillo dumorum (Dollfus, 1896)^{i c g}
- Venezillo elegans (Nunomura, 1990)^{c g}
- Venezillo festivus (Budde-Lund, 1904)^{i c g}
- Venezillo fillolae Rodriguez & Barrientos, 1993^{i c g}
- Venezillo flavescens (Brandt, 1833)^{i c g}
- Venezillo furcatus (Barnard, 1932)^{i c g}
- Venezillo galapagoensis (Miers, 1877)^{i c g}
- Venezillo gigas (Miers, 1877)^{i c g}
- Venezillo glomus (Budde-Lund, 1898)^{i c g}
- Venezillo gordoniensis (Barnard, 1932)^{i c g}
- Venezillo grenadensis (Budde-Lund, 1893)^{i c g}
- Venezillo hasegawai (Nunomura, 1991)^{c g}
- Venezillo hendersoni (Boone, 1934)^{i c g}
- Venezillo herscheli (Barnard, 1932)^{i c g}
- Venezillo hiurai (Nunomura, 1991)^{c g}
- Venezillo hypsinephes (Barnard, 1932)^{i c g}
- Venezillo jamaicensis (Richardson, 1912)^{i c g}
- Venezillo kaokoensis (Barnard, 1932)^{i c g}
- Venezillo kogmani (Barnard, 1932)^{i c g}
- Venezillo kunigamiensis (Nunomura, 1991)^{c g}
- Venezillo lacustris Taiti & Ferrara, 1987^{i c g}
- Venezillo lepidus Nunomura, 2003^{c g}
- Venezillo limenites (Barnard, 1932)^{i c g}
- Venezillo lineatus (Nunomura, 1990)^{c g}
- Venezillo llamasi Rioja, 1954^{i c g}
- Venezillo longipes (Budde-Lund, 1909)^{i c g}
- Venezillo longispinis (Richardson, 1912)^{i c g}
- Venezillo longispinus Nunomura, 2003^{c g}
- Venezillo macrodens (Barnard, 1932)^{i c g}
- Venezillo macrosoma Mulaik, 1960^{i c g}
- Venezillo meiringi (Barnard, 1932)^{i c g}
- Venezillo mexicanus (Verhoeff, 1933)^{i c g}
- Venezillo microphthalmus (Arcangeli, 1932)^{i c g}
- Venezillo mineri (Van Name, 1936)^{i}
- Venezillo mixtus (Budde-Lund, 1904)^{i c g}
- Venezillo moneaguensis (Van Name, 1936)^{i c g}
- Venezillo montagui (Barnard, 1932)^{i c g}
- Venezillo multipunctatus (Budde-Lund, 1885)^{i c g}
- Venezillo nanus (Budde-Lund, 1910)^{c g}
- Venezillo natalensis (Collinge, 1917)^{i c g}
- Venezillo nebulosus (Barnard, 1932)^{i c g}
- Venezillo nevadensis (Mulaik, 1960)^{i c g}
- Venezillo nigricans (Brandt, 1833)^{i c g}
- Venezillo nigrorufus (Dollfus, 1893)^{i c g}
- Venezillo oaxacanus (Van Name, 1936)^{i c g}
- Venezillo oharaensis (Nunomura, 1992)^{c}
- Venezillo orbicularis (Budde-Lund, 1885)^{i c g}
- Venezillo orosioi (Mulaik, 1960)^{i g}
- Venezillo orphanus (Barnard, 1932)^{i c g}
- Venezillo osorioi (Mulaik, 1960)^{c g}
- Venezillo ovampoensis (Barnard, 1924)^{i c g}
- Venezillo pachytos (Barnard, 1932)^{i c g}
- Venezillo parvus (Budde-Lund, 1885)^{i c g b}
- Venezillo perlatus (Dollfus, 1896)^{i c g}
- Venezillo phylax (Van Name, 1936)^{i c g}
- Venezillo pilula (Barnard, 1932)^{i c g}
- Venezillo pisum (Budde-Lund, 1885)^{i c g}
- Venezillo pleogoniophorus (Rioja, 1951)^{c g}
- Venezillo pleogoniphorus (Rioja, 1951)^{i g}
- Venezillo polythele (Barnard, 1932)^{i c g}
- Venezillo pongolae (Barnard, 1937)^{i c g}
- Venezillo pruinosus (Arcangeli, 1950)^{i c g}
- Venezillo pseudoparvus Ferrara & Taiti, 1985^{i c g}
- Venezillo pumilus (Budde-Lund, 1893)^{i c g}
- Venezillo pusillus (Budde-Lund, 1909)^{i c g}
- Venezillo quadrimaculatus (Budde-Lund, 1909)^{i c g}
- Venezillo ramsdeni (Boone, 1934)^{c g}
- Venezillo rubropunctatus (Budde-Lund, 1893)^{i c g}
- Venezillo rufescens (Budde-Lund, 1909)^{i c g}
- Venezillo saldanhae (Barnard, 1932)^{i c g}
- Venezillo sanchezi (Boone, 1934)^{i c g}
- Venezillo scaberrimus (Dollfus, 1893)^{i c g}
- Venezillo schultzei Verhoeff, 1933^{i c g}
- Venezillo shuriensis (Nunomura, 1990)^{c g}
- Venezillo silvarum (Dollfus, 1896)^{c g}
- Venezillo silvicola Mulaik, 1960^{i c}
- Venezillo similis (Budde-Lund, 1885)^{c g}
- Venezillo soleiformis (Nunomura, 1991)^{c g}
- Venezillo soyatlanensis Mulaik, 1960^{i c g}
- Venezillo steenbrasi (Barnard, 1932)^{i c g}
- Venezillo stuckchensis (Mulaik, 1960)^{c g}
- Venezillo sylvicola (Mulaik, 1960)^{c g}
- Venezillo tanneri (S. Mulaik and D. Mulaik, 1942)^{i c g}
- Venezillo tenerifensis Dalens, 1984^{c g}
- Venezillo tomiyamai (Nunomura, 1991)^{c g}
- Venezillo tradouwi (Barnard, 1932)^{i c g}
- Venezillo trifolium (Dollfus, 1890)^{i c g}
- Venezillo truncorum (Budde-Lund, 1893)^{i c g}
- Venezillo tuberosus (Budde-Lund, 1904)^{i c g}
- Venezillo tugelae (Barnard, 1932)^{i c g}
- Venezillo venustus (Budde-Lund, 1893)^{i c g}
- Venezillo verrucosus (Budde-Lund, 1904)^{i c g}
- Venezillo vincentis (Budde-Lund, 1904)^{c g}
- Venezillo viticola (Dollfus, 1896)^{i c g}
- Venezillo walkeri (Pearse, 1911)^{i c g}
- Venezillo watsoni (Van Name, 1936)^{i c g}
- Venezillo wheeleri (Van Name, 1936)^{i c g}
- Venezillo yaeyamanus (Nunomura, 1990)^{c g}
- Venezillo yonaguniensis (Nunomura, 1990)^{c g}
- Venezillo zigzag (Dollfus, 1896)^{i c g}
- Venezillo zonalis (Nunomura, 1991)^{c g}
- Venezillo zwartbergensis (Barnard, 1932)^{i c g}

Data sources: i = ITIS, c = Catalogue of Life, g = GBIF, b = Bugguide.net
