= Tura laticauda =

Scientific classification
- Kingdom: Animalia
- Phylum: Arthropoda
- Clade: Pancrustacea
- Class: Malacostraca
- Order: Isopoda
- Suborder: Oniscidea
- Family: Porcellionidae
- Genus: Tura
- Species: T. laticauda

Binomial name
- Tura laticauda (Budde-Lund, 1913)

Synonyms
- Porcellio (Tura) laticauda Budde-Lund, 1912

Species of isopod

Tura laticauda is a species of woodlouse belonging to the genus Tura within the terrestrial isopod family Porcellionidae.

The species was first scientifically described by Danish carcinologist Gustav Budde-Lund in 1913 and assigned to genus Porcellio. It is a terrestrial woodlouse native to East Africa.

The specific name laticauda translates from scientific Latin as "broad-tailed" (derived from latus, meaning wide, and cauda, meaning tail), which refers to the distinct anatomical shape of its posterior segments.
