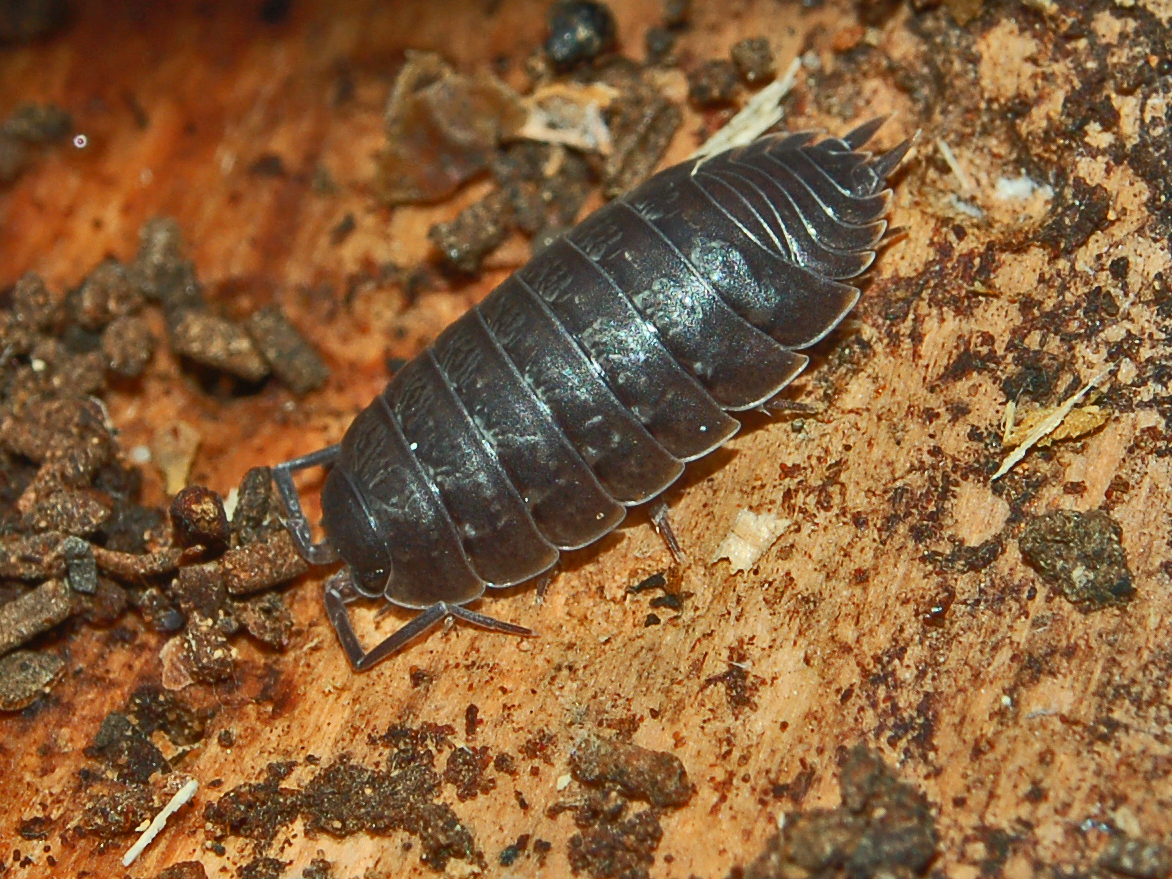

Scientific classification
- Kingdom: Animalia
- Phylum: Arthropoda
- Class: Malacostraca
- Order: Isopoda
- Suborder: Oniscidea
- Family: Porcellionidae
- Genus: Porcellio
- Species: P. pumicatus

Binomial name
- Porcellio pumicatus Budde-Lund, 1885

Synonyms
- Porcellio orarum verhoeffi Dahl, 1916; Porcellio strandi Strouhal, 1937; Porcellio verhoeffi Dahl, 1916

= Porcellio pumicatus =

Species of woodlouse

Porcellio pumicatus is a species of woodlouse in the genus Porcellio belonging to the family Porcellionidae. This species is known to occur in Central Italy and on Sardinia. Adults reach about 15 millimetres (0.59 in) long and can mostly be encountered under stones.
