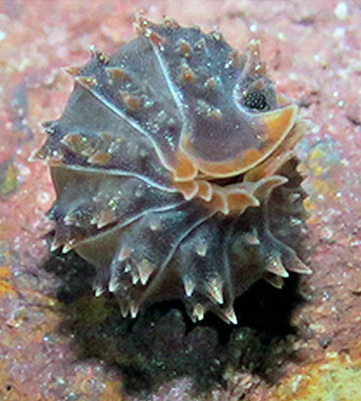
- Diploexochus echinatus

Scientific classification
- Kingdom: Animalia
- Phylum: Arthropoda
- Clade: Pancrustacea
- Class: Malacostraca
- Order: Isopoda
- Suborder: Oniscidea
- Family: Armadillidae
- Genus: Diploexochus; Brandt, 1833

= Diploexochus =

Genus of woodlice

Diploexochus is a genus of woodlice belonging to the family Armadillidae. This genus was described in 1833 by Johann Friedrich von Brandt. The type specimen for this species is a Diploexochus echinatus from Brazil. There are currently nine accepted species in this genus.

== Description ==
The genus Diploexochus is characterized by the shape and direction of the epimera (lateral margins) of the first to seventh thoracic segments and the epimera of the third to fifth pleon segments. This genus also has a large cleft on the epimera of the first thoracic segment, a shield that extends past the end of the head, and well-developed dorsal tubercles.

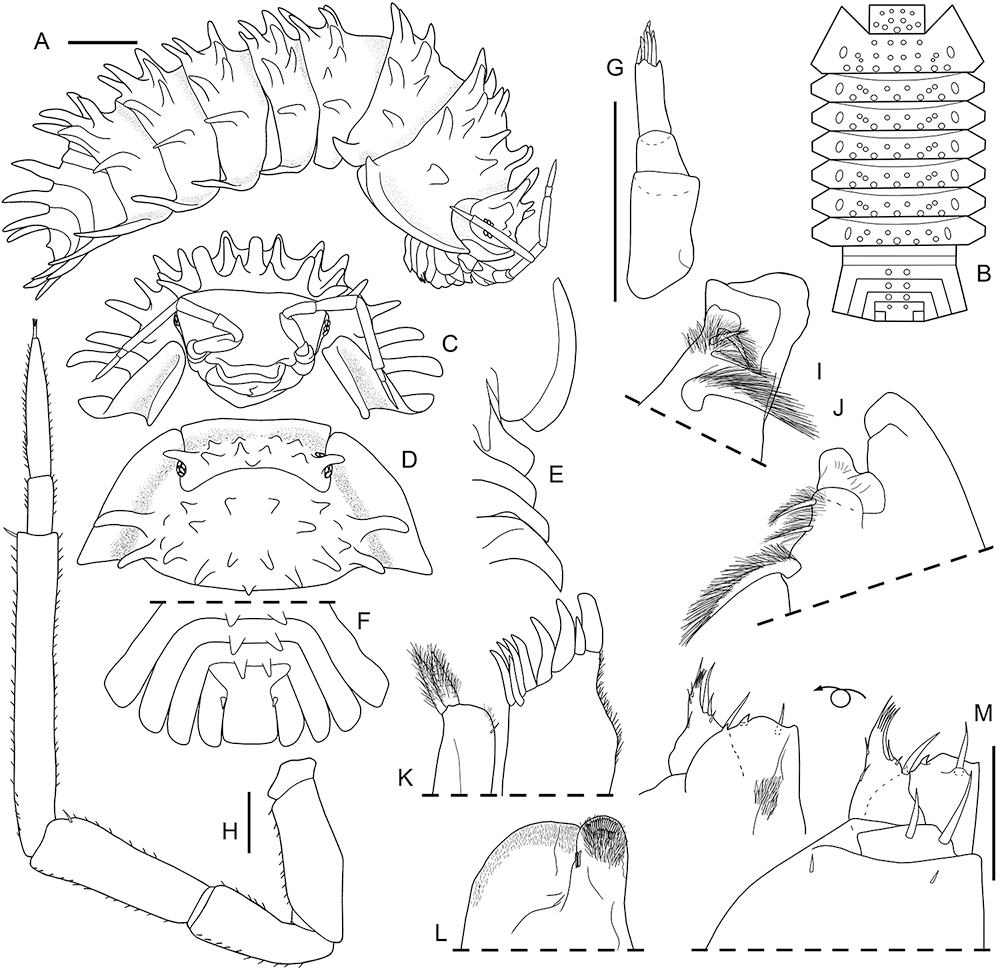
Anatomy of Diploexochus spinatus

== Distribution ==
The accepted species in this genus have only been found in the Neotropics. These species have been found in Brazil, Colombia, French Guiana, Guyana, and Trinidad.

Two disputed species in this genus, D. cataractae and D. formicarum, have been found in South Africa. One other disputed species, D. jeanneli, has been found in Kenya.

Many species in this genus are troglobitic.

== Species ==
There are currently nine species that are considered part of this genus and over 60 species that were once considered part of this genus that no longer are. Many of the species were moved to the genera Venezillo, Ctenorillo, Myrmecodillo, and Pachydillo, among others.

- Diploexochus brevispinis (Pearse, 1915)
- Diploexochus cacique López-Orozco, Carpio-Díaz & Campos-Filho in Borja-Arrieta, López-Orozco, Carpio-Díaz, Gutierrez-Estrada, Campos-Filho, Navas-S. & Bichuette, 2025
- Diploexochus caiapos López-Orozco, CamposFilho & Carpio-Díaz in López-Orozco, Campos-Filho, Carpio-Díaz, Borja-Arrieta, Gallão, Horta & Bichuette, 2025
- Diploexochus carrapicho Campos-Filho, López-Orozco & Taiti in Campos-Filho, Sfenthourakis, Gallo, Gallão, Torres, Chagas-Jr, Horta, Carpio-Díaz, López-Orozco, Borja-Arrieta, Araujo, Taiti & Bichuette, 2023
- Diploexochus echinatus Brandt, 1833
- Diploexochus exu Campos-Filho, Sfenthourakis & Bichuette in Campos-Filho, Sfenthourakis, Gallo, Gallão, Torres, Chagas-Jr, Horta, Carpio-Díaz, López-Orozco, Borja-Arrieta, Araujo, Taiti & Bichuette, 2023
- Diploexochus obscurus Cardoso, Bastos-Pereira & Ferreira, 2023
- Diploexochus spinatus Cardoso, Bastos-Pereira & Ferreira, 2023
- Diploexochus troglobius López-Orozco, Carpio-Díaz & Campos-Filho in Borja-Arrieta, López-Orozco, Carpio-Díaz, Gutierrez-Estrada, Campos-Filho, Navas-S. & Bichuette, 2025

=== Species with debated placement in this genus ===
- Diploexochus cataractae Barnard, 1937
- Diploexochus formicarum Budde-Lund, 1909
- Diploexochus jeanneli Paulian de Félice, 1945
