= Trachelipus ater =

Scientific classification
- Kingdom: Animalia
- Phylum: Arthropoda
- Class: Malacostraca
- Order: Isopoda
- Suborder: Oniscidea
- Family: Trachelipodidae
- Genus: Trachelipus
- Species: T. ater

Binomial name
- Trachelipus ater (Budde-Lund, 1896)

Synonyms
- Porcellio ater Budde-Lund, 1896; Porcellio vareae Radu, 1949

Species of woodlouse

Trachelipus ater is a species of woodlouse in the genus Trachelipus belonging to the family Trachelipodidae that is endemic to Romania.
