= Trachelipus rhinoceros =

Scientific classification
- Kingdom: Animalia
- Phylum: Arthropoda
- Class: Malacostraca
- Order: Isopoda
- Suborder: Oniscidea
- Family: Trachelipodidae
- Genus: Trachelipus
- Species: T. rhinoceros

Binomial name
- Trachelipus rhinoceros (Budde-Lund, 1885)

Synonyms
- Nasigerio rhinoceros; Porcellio rhinoceros

Species of woodlouse

Trachelipus rhinoceros is a species of woodlouse in the genus Trachelipus belonging to the family Trachelipodidae that can be found in Croatia, Italy, and Romania. Despite the similarity in the name, the Trachelipus is not a relative of the Rhinoceratidae.
