= Porcellio obsoletus =

Scientific classification
- Kingdom: Animalia
- Phylum: Arthropoda
- Class: Malacostraca
- Order: Isopoda
- Suborder: Oniscidea
- Family: Porcellionidae
- Genus: Porcellio
- Species: P. obsoletus

Binomial name
- Porcellio obsoletus Budde-Lund, 1825

Species of woodlouse

Porcellio obsoletus is a species of woodlouse in the genus Porcellio belonging to the family Porcellionidae that can be found on islands like Crete, Cyclades, Cyprus, Dodecanese, Malta, North Aegean, and Sicily. It can also be found in such European countries as Albania, Croatia, Greece, Italy, Ukraine, and European part of Turkey.
