= Porcellio albinus =

Scientific classification
- Kingdom: Animalia
- Phylum: Arthropoda
- Class: Malacostraca
- Order: Isopoda
- Suborder: Oniscidea
- Family: Porcellionidae
- Genus: Porcellio
- Species: P. albinus

Binomial name
- Porcellio albinus Budde-Lund, 1885

Species of woodlouse

Porcellio albinus is a species of woodlouse in the family Porcellionidae that can be found in North Africa.
