= Porcellio pulverulentus =

Scientific classification
- Kingdom: Animalia
- Phylum: Arthropoda
- Class: Malacostraca
- Order: Isopoda
- Suborder: Oniscidea
- Family: Porcellionidae
- Genus: Porcellio
- Species: P. pulverulentus

Binomial name
- Porcellio pulverulentus Budde-Lund, 1885

Species of woodlouse

Porcellio pulverulentus is a species of woodlouse in the genus Porcellio belonging to the family Porcellionidae that is endemic to mainland Spain.
