= Trachelipus planarius =

Scientific classification
- Kingdom: Animalia
- Phylum: Arthropoda
- Class: Malacostraca
- Order: Isopoda
- Suborder: Oniscidea
- Family: Trachelipodidae
- Genus: Trachelipus
- Species: T. planarius

Binomial name
- Trachelipus planarius Budde-Lund, 1885

Synonyms
- Porcellio planarius

Species of woodlouse

Trachelipus planarius is a species of woodlouse in the genus Trachelipus belonging to the family Trachelipodidae that can be found in Sicily.
