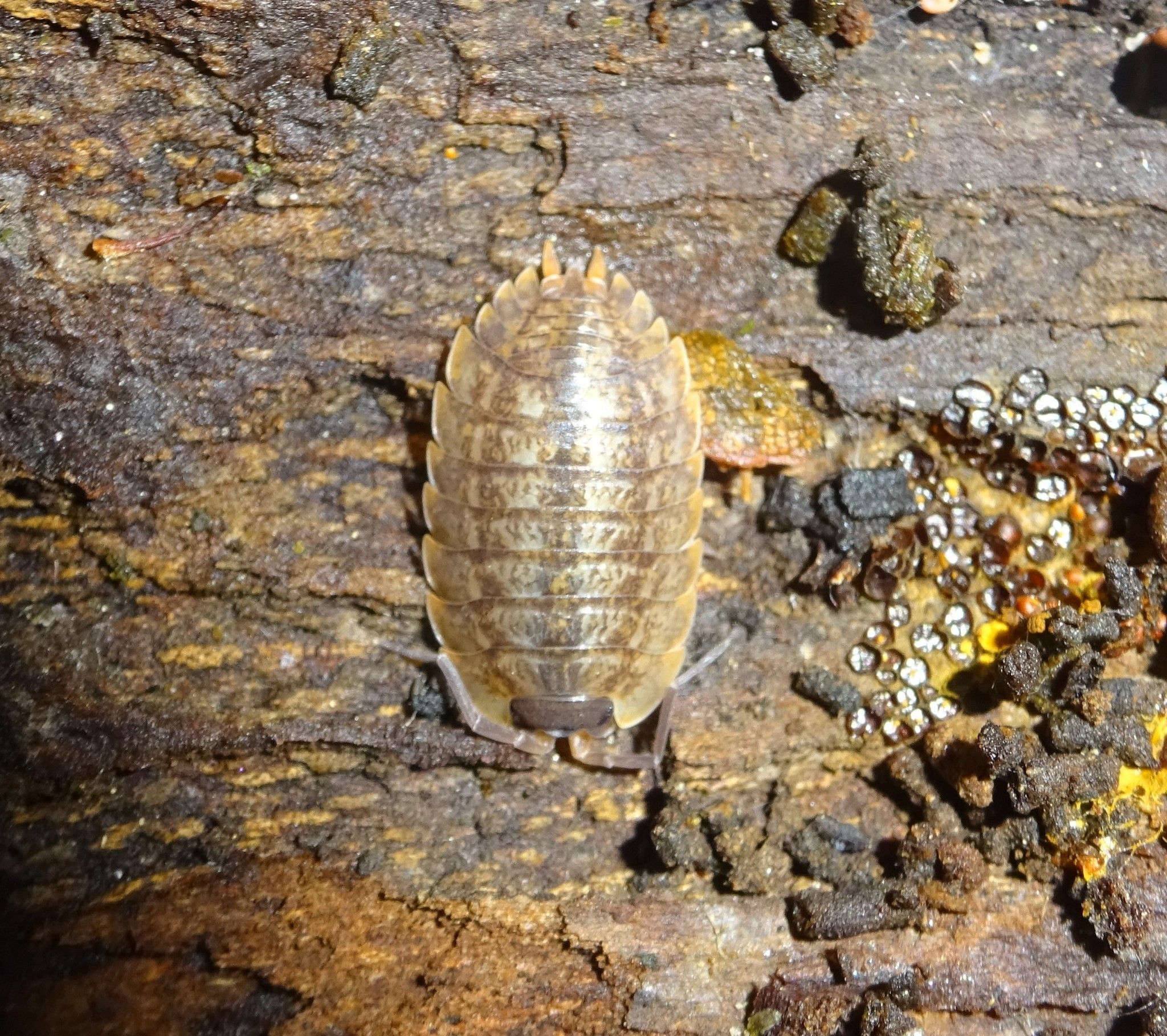

Scientific classification
- Kingdom: Animalia
- Phylum: Arthropoda
- Class: Malacostraca
- Order: Isopoda
- Suborder: Oniscidea
- Family: Porcellionidae
- Genus: Porcellio
- Species: P. montanus

Binomial name
- Porcellio montanus Budde-Lund, 1885

= Porcellio montanus =

Species of woodlouse

Porcellio montanus is a species of woodlouse in the genus Porcellio belonging to the family Porcellionidae that can be found in Czech Republic, France, Italy and Switzerland. Only one subspecies have been recorded, Porcellio montanus alpivagus Verhoeff, 1928.
