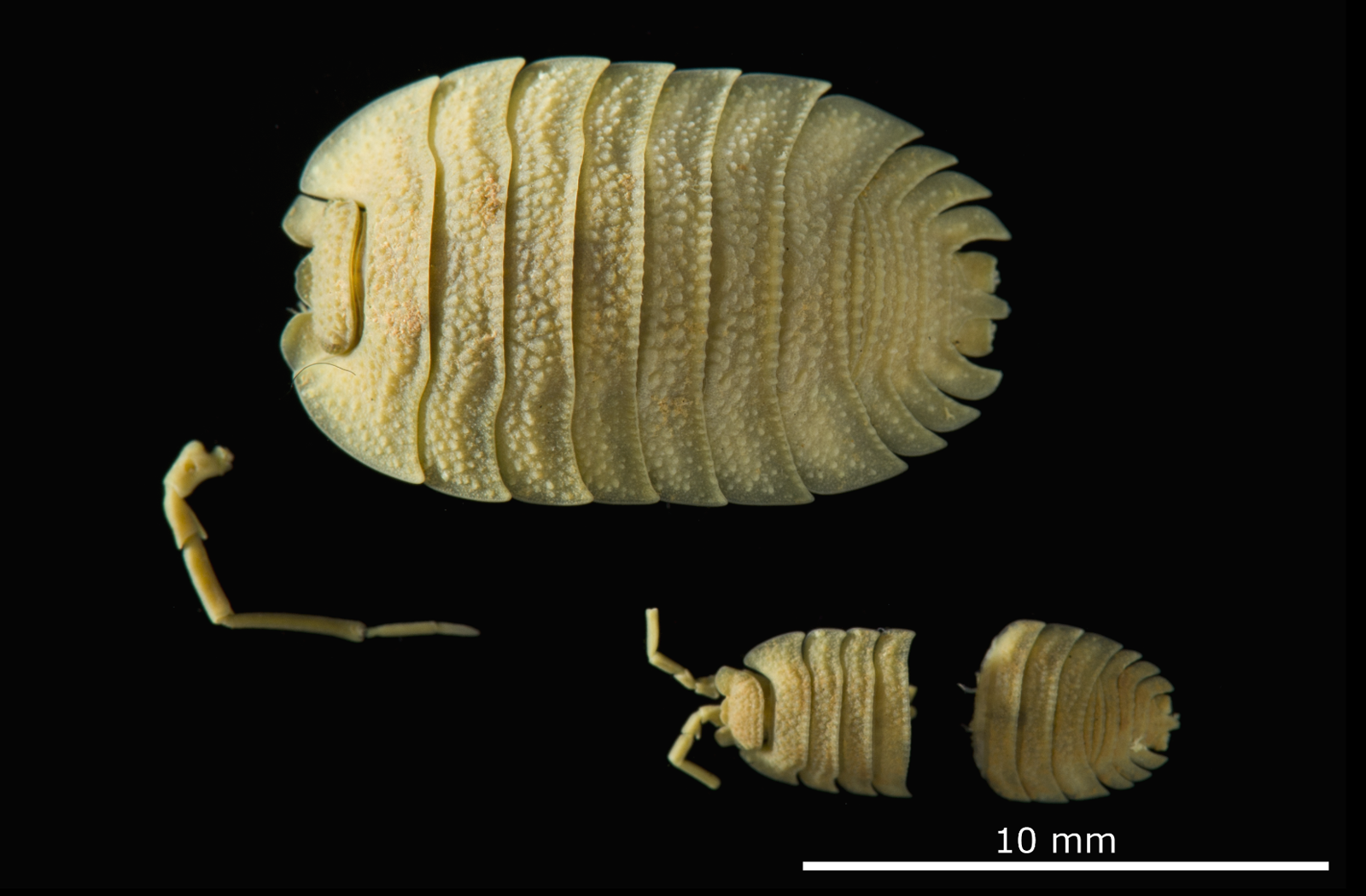

Scientific classification
- Kingdom: Animalia
- Phylum: Arthropoda
- Class: Malacostraca
- Order: Isopoda
- Suborder: Oniscidea
- Family: Porcellionidae
- Genus: Porcellio
- Species: P. auritus

Binomial name
- Porcellio auritus Budde-Lund, 1879

= Porcellio auritus =

Species of woodlouse

Porcellio auritus is a species of woodlouse in the genus Porcellio belonging to the family Porcellionidae that can be found in Spain.
