= Trachelipus spretus =

Scientific classification
- Kingdom: Animalia
- Phylum: Arthropoda
- Class: Malacostraca
- Order: Isopoda
- Suborder: Oniscidea
- Family: Trachelipodidae
- Genus: Trachelipus
- Species: T. spretus

Binomial name
- Trachelipus spretus Budde-Lund, 1885

Species of woodlouse

Trachelipus spretus is a species of woodlouse in the genus Trachelipus belonging to the family Trachelipodidae that can be found in Sicily.
