= Porcellio flavocinctus =

Scientific classification
- Kingdom: Animalia
- Phylum: Arthropoda
- Class: Malacostraca
- Order: Isopoda
- Suborder: Oniscidea
- Family: Porcellionidae
- Genus: Porcellio
- Species: P. flavocinctus

Binomial name
- Porcellio flavocinctus Budde-Lund, 1879

Species of woodlouse

Porcellio flavocinctus is a species of woodlouse in the genus Porcellio belonging to the family Porcellionidae that can be found on islands like Crete, Cyclades, Cyprus, Dodecanese, Malta, North Aegean, and Sicily. It can also be found in such western European countries as Portugal and Spain.
