= Trachelipus sarmaticus =

Scientific classification
- Kingdom: Animalia
- Phylum: Arthropoda
- Class: Malacostraca
- Order: Isopoda
- Suborder: Oniscidea
- Family: Trachelipodidae
- Genus: Trachelipus
- Species: T. sarmaticus

Binomial name
- Trachelipus sarmaticus Borutzkii, 1976

Species of woodlouse

Trachelipus sarmaticus is a species of woodlouse in the genus Trachelipus belonging to the family Trachelipodidae that can be found in Ukraine.
