= Porcellio ferroi =

Scientific classification
- Kingdom: Animalia
- Phylum: Arthropoda
- Class: Malacostraca
- Order: Isopoda
- Suborder: Oniscidea
- Family: Porcellionidae
- Genus: Porcellio
- Species: P. ferroi

Binomial name
- Porcellio ferroi Paulian de Felice, 1939

Species of woodlouse

Porcellio ferroi is a species of woodlouse in the genus Porcellio belonging to the family Porcellionidae that is endemic to Madeira.
