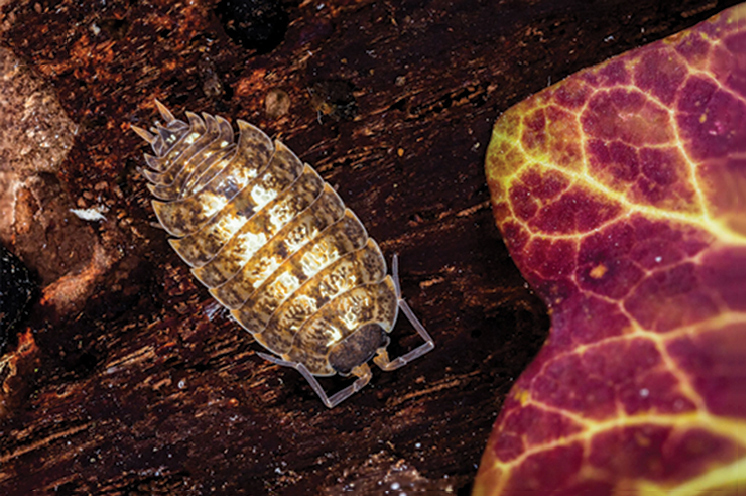

Scientific classification
- Kingdom: Animalia
- Phylum: Arthropoda
- Class: Malacostraca
- Order: Isopoda
- Suborder: Oniscidea
- Family: Porcellionidae
- Genus: Porcellio
- Species: P. monticola

Binomial name
- Porcellio monticola Lereboullet, 1853

= Porcellio monticola =

Species of woodlouse

Porcellio monticola is a species of woodlouse in the genus Porcellio belonging to the family Porcellionidae that can be found in such European countries as Austria, France, Germany, Hungary, Luxembourg, Spain, and Switzerland.
