= Porcellio achilleionensis =

Scientific classification
- Domain: Eukaryota
- Kingdom: Animalia
- Phylum: Arthropoda
- Class: Malacostraca
- Order: Isopoda
- Suborder: Oniscidea
- Family: Porcellionidae
- Genus: Porcellio
- Species: P. achilleionensis

Binomial name
- Porcellio achilleionensis Verhoeff, 1901

Species of woodlouse

Porcellio achilleionensis is a terrestrial isopod species of the genus Porcellio. It is found in the Mediterranean region, specifically in Greece and the island of Crete.

== Description ==
Porcellio achilleionensis is a small isopod, typically measuring around 10-15mm in length. It has a reddish-brown coloration, with a smooth, glossy exoskeleton.

== Habitat and distribution ==
Porcellio achilleionensis is found in a variety of habitats, including rocky outcrops, scrubland, and Mediterranean forests. The species is most commonly found in areas with high levels of humidity, such as near streams or on shaded slopes. It is endemic to Greece and the island of Crete, where it is found in scattered populations.

== Development and maternal care ==
Like all species of Isopoda Porcellio achilleionensis directly develops from yolky eggs. Both the eggs and juveniles develop within a brood pouch called a marsupium until the first juvenile stage. The use of the marsupium eliminates the need for an external water source for early development since it is filled with fluid from the mother isopod.

== Conservation ==
Porcellio achilleionensis is not currently listed as a threatened species by the International Union for Conservation of Nature (IUCN). However, the species is considered to be rare, with limited populations found in specific areas. Habitat destruction and degradation, as well as pollution, are believed to be the main threats facing the species. Further research is needed to determine the conservation status of P. achilleionensis and to develop appropriate conservation measures.
