= Trachelipus razzautii =

Scientific classification
- Kingdom: Animalia
- Phylum: Arthropoda
- Class: Malacostraca
- Order: Isopoda
- Suborder: Oniscidea
- Family: Trachelipodidae
- Genus: Trachelipus
- Species: T. razzautii

Binomial name
- Trachelipus razzautii (Arcangeli, 1913)

Species of woodlouse

Trachelipus razzautii is a species of woodlouse in the genus Trachelipus belonging to the family Trachelipodidae that can be found in northern Italy, Slovenia, the Greek island of Lesbos and European Turkey.
