= Trachelipus radui =

Scientific classification
- Kingdom: Animalia
- Phylum: Arthropoda
- Class: Malacostraca
- Order: Isopoda
- Suborder: Oniscidea
- Family: Trachelipodidae
- Genus: Trachelipus
- Species: T. radui

Binomial name
- Trachelipus radui Tomescu & Olariu, 2000

Species of woodlouse

Trachelipus radui is a species of woodlouse in the genus Trachelipus belonging to the family Trachelipodidae that is endemic to Romania.
