= Porcellio parenzani =

Scientific classification
- Kingdom: Animalia
- Phylum: Arthropoda
- Class: Malacostraca
- Order: Isopoda
- Suborder: Oniscidea
- Family: Porcellionidae
- Genus: Porcellio
- Species: P. parenzani

Binomial name
- Porcellio parenzani Arcangeli, 1931

Species of woodlouse

Porcellio parenzani is a species of woodlouse in the genus Porcellio belonging to the family Porcellionidae that can be found in Albania.
