= Trachelipus ottomanicus =

Scientific classification
- Kingdom: Animalia
- Phylum: Arthropoda
- Clade: Pancrustacea
- Class: Malacostraca
- Order: Isopoda
- Suborder: Oniscidea
- Family: Trachelipodidae
- Genus: Trachelipus
- Species: T. ottomanicus

Binomial name
- Trachelipus ottomanicus Vandel, 1980

Species of woodlouse

Trachelipus ottomanicus is a species of woodlouse in the genus Trachelipus, belonging to the family Trachelipodidae. It is a terrestrial isopod that lives on land and feeds mainly on decaying plant material and other organic matter, making it a detritivore. Like other terrestrial woodlice, it moves by walking on its legs rather than by swimming. Trachelipus ottomanicus was first described by the French zoologist Albert Vandel in 1980. The species was published in Bulletin de la Société d'Histoire Naturelle de Toulouse, volume 116, in the paper Les isopodes terrestres recueillis en Turquie orientale et en Irak occidentale par le Professeur Curt Kosswig.
