= Trachelipus pierantonii =

Scientific classification
- Kingdom: Animalia
- Phylum: Arthropoda
- Clade: Pancrustacea
- Class: Malacostraca
- Order: Isopoda
- Suborder: Oniscidea
- Family: Trachelipodidae
- Genus: Trachelipus
- Species: T. pierantonii

Binomial name
- Trachelipus pierantonii (Arcangeli, 1932)

Synonyms
- Tracheoniscus pierantonii Arcangeli, 1932

Species of woodlouse

Trachelipus pierantonii is a species of woodlouse in the genus Trachelipus belonging to the family Trachelipodidae that can be found in Trento, Italy.
