= Porcellio rufobrunneus =

Scientific classification
- Kingdom: Animalia
- Phylum: Arthropoda
- Class: Malacostraca
- Order: Isopoda
- Suborder: Oniscidea
- Family: Porcellionidae
- Genus: Porcellio
- Species: P. rufobrunneus

Binomial name
- Porcellio rufobrunneus Omer-Cooper, 1923

Species of woodlouse

Porcellio rufobrunneus is a species of woodlouse from the Porcellionidae family. The scientific name of this species was first published in 1923 by Omer-Cooper.
