= Porcellio albicornis =

Scientific classification
- Kingdom: Animalia
- Phylum: Arthropoda
- Class: Malacostraca
- Order: Isopoda
- Suborder: Oniscidea
- Family: Porcellionidae
- Genus: Porcellio
- Species: P. albicornis

Binomial name
- Porcellio albicornis (Dollfus, 1896)

Synonyms
- Lucasius albicornis Dollfus, 1896

Species of woodlouse

Porcellio albicornis is a species of woodlouse in the family Porcellionidae. It is found in Italy, including the island of Sicily from where it was first described.
