= Trachelipus gagriensis =

Scientific classification
- Kingdom: Animalia
- Phylum: Arthropoda
- Class: Malacostraca
- Order: Isopoda
- Suborder: Oniscidea
- Family: Trachelipodidae
- Genus: Trachelipus
- Species: T. gagriensis

Binomial name
- Trachelipus gagriensis (Verhoeff, 1918)

Synonyms
- Porcellio gagriensis; Tracheoniscus gagriensis

Species of woodlouse

Trachelipus gagriensis is a species of woodlouse in the genus Trachelipus belonging to the family Trachelipodidae that can be found in Ukraine and Georgia.
