= Trachelipus nodulosus =

Scientific classification
- Kingdom: Animalia
- Phylum: Arthropoda
- Class: Malacostraca
- Order: Isopoda
- Suborder: Oniscidea
- Family: Trachelipodidae
- Genus: Trachelipus
- Species: T. nodulosus

Binomial name
- Trachelipus nodulosus (Koch, 1838)

Synonyms
- Porcellio aemulus; Porcellio balticus; Porcellio nodulosus; Porcellium nodulosus; Trachelipus balticus; Tracheoniscus balticus; Tracheoniscus nodulosus

Species of woodlouse

Trachelipus nodulosus is a species of woodlouse in the genus Trachelipus belonging to the family Trachelipodidae that can be found in Austria, Czech Republic, Germany, Hungary, Poland, Romania, Slovakia, and in all states of former Yugoslavia (except for North Macedonia and Slovenia). It is found in the soil, under grass.
