= Trachelipus dimorphus =

Scientific classification
- Kingdom: Animalia
- Phylum: Arthropoda
- Class: Malacostraca
- Order: Isopoda
- Suborder: Oniscidea
- Family: Trachelipodidae
- Genus: Trachelipus
- Species: T. dimorphus

Binomial name
- Trachelipus dimorphus Frankenberger, 1941

Synonyms
- Porcellio dimorphus; Tracheoniscus dimorphus; Tracheoniscus waechtleri; Trachelipus waechtleri

Species of woodlouse

Trachelipus dimorphus is a species of woodlouse in the genus Trachelipus belonging to the family Trachelipodidae that can be found in Romania, Kosovo, Montenegro, Serbia and Vojvodina.
