= Porcellio festai =

Scientific classification
- Kingdom: Animalia
- Phylum: Arthropoda
- Clade: Pancrustacea
- Class: Malacostraca
- Order: Isopoda
- Suborder: Oniscidea
- Family: Porcellionidae
- Genus: Porcellio
- Species: P. festai

Binomial name
- Porcellio festai Arcangeli, 1932

Species of woodlouse

Porcellio festai is a species of woodlouse in the genus Porcellio belonging to the family Porcellionidae that is endemic to Italy.
