= Trachelipus remyi =

Scientific classification
- Kingdom: Animalia
- Phylum: Arthropoda
- Class: Malacostraca
- Order: Isopoda
- Suborder: Oniscidea
- Family: Trachelipodidae
- Genus: Trachelipus
- Species: T. emyi

Binomial name
- Trachelipus emyi (Verhoeff, 1933)

Species of woodlouse

Trachelipus remyi is a species of woodlouse in the genus Trachelipus belonging to the family Trachelipodidae that can be found in former Yugoslavian states such as Kosovo, Montenegro, and Serbia.
