= Nagurus =

Scientific classification
- Kingdom: Animalia
- Phylum: Arthropoda
- Clade: Pancrustacea
- Class: Malacostraca
- Order: Isopoda
- Suborder: Oniscidea
- Family: Trachelipodidae
- Genus: Nagurus; Holthuis, 1949

Type species
- Porcellio cristatus Dollfus, 1889

Synonyms
- Bifrontonia Radu, 1960; Porcellio (Heminagara) Jackson, 1935; Porcellio (Heminagara) Jackson, 1933; Nagara (Nagaroides) Wahrberg, 1922; Nagaroides Wahrberg, 1922; Porcellio (Nagaroides) Wahrberg, 1922; Nagara (Nagara) Budde-Lund, 1908; Nagara Budde-Lund, 1908; Porcellio (Nagara) Budde-Lund, 1908

Genus of isopods

Nagurus is a genus of isopod in the family Trachelipodidae. There are 40 species assigned to this genus, including species previous assigned to Porcellio in the subgenera Heminagara, Nagaroides, and Nagara:

- Nagurus acutitelson Ferrara & Taiti, 1982
- Nagurus aegaeus Schmalfuss, 1977
- Nagurus alticolus (Vandel, 1973)
- Nagurus carinatus (Dollfus, 1905)
- Nagurus chengzicus Dai & Cai, 1998
- Nagurus clavigerus (Verhoeff, 1936)
- Nagurus cristatus (Dollfus, 1889)
- Nagurus cubanocolens Vandel, 1981
- Nagurus declivus (Wahrberg, 1922)
- Nagurus emarginatus (Arcangeli, 1934)
- Nagurus galleranii (Arcangeli, 1927)
- Nagurus gracillimus (Wahrberg, 1922)
- Nagurus havelocki Ferrara & Taiti, 1982
- Nagurus kensleyi Ferrara & Taiti, 1985
- Nagurus kunigamiensis Nunomura, 1992
- Nagurus latitracheatus (Herold, 1931)
- Nagurus lavis Schultz, 1982
- Nagurus lineatus Nunomura, 1987
- Nagurus longiflagellatus (Wahrberg, 1922)
- Nagurus manangus Schmalfuss, 1983
- Nagurus matekini (Borutzkii, 1948)
- Nagurus miyakoensis Nunomura, 1987
- Nagurus modestus (Dollfus, 1898)
- Nagurus nanus (Budde-Lund, 1908)
- Nagurus okinawaensis Nunomura, 1992
- Nagurus onisciformis Schmölzer, 1974
- Nagurus pallidipennis (Dollfus, 1898)
- Nagurus pallidus (Arcangeli, 1934)
- Nagurus rhodiensis (Arcangeli, 1934)
- Nagurus silvicola Nunomura & Xie, 2000
- Nagurus sinensis (Arcangeli, 1927)
- Nagurus sundaicus (Dollfus, 1898)
- Nagurus tahitiensis (Jackson, 1935)
- Nagurus teretifrons (Herold, 1931)
- Nagurus tokunoshimaensis Nunomura, 1987
- Nagurus travancorius (Verhoeff, 1936)
- Nagurus tumidus (Wahrberg, 1922)
- Nagurus vandeli (Arcangeli, 1927)
- Nagurus verhoeffi (Arcangeli, 1952)
- Nagurus ziegleri Schmalfuss, 1994
