= Trachelipus riparianus =

Scientific classification
- Kingdom: Animalia
- Phylum: Arthropoda
- Clade: Pancrustacea
- Class: Malacostraca
- Order: Isopoda
- Suborder: Oniscidea
- Family: Trachelipodidae
- Genus: Trachelipus
- Species: T. riparianus

Binomial name
- Trachelipus riparianus (Verhoeff, 1936)

Synonyms
- Nasigerio riparianus; Porcellio riparianus

Species of woodlouse

Trachelipus riparianus is a species of woodlouse in the genus Trachelipus belonging to the family Trachelipodidae that is endemic to Italy.
