= Porcellio normani =

Scientific classification
- Kingdom: Animalia
- Phylum: Arthropoda
- Class: Malacostraca
- Order: Isopoda
- Suborder: Oniscidea
- Family: Porcellionidae
- Genus: Porcellio
- Species: P. normani

Binomial name
- Porcellio normani (Dollfus, 1899)

Synonyms
- Lucasius normani Dollfus, 1896

Species of woodlouse

Porcellio normani is a species of woodlouse in the genus Porcellio belonging to the family Porcellionidae that can be found on Madeira.
