= Porcellio xavieri =

Scientific classification
- Kingdom: Animalia
- Phylum: Arthropoda
- Class: Malacostraca
- Order: Isopoda
- Suborder: Oniscidea
- Family: Porcellionidae
- Genus: Porcellio
- Species: P. xavieri

Binomial name
- Porcellio xavieri Arcangeli, 1959

Species of woodlouse

Porcellio xavieri is a species of woodlouse in the genus Porcellio belonging to the family Porcellionidae that is endemic to Madeira.
