= Porcellio expansus =

Scientific classification
- Kingdom: Animalia
- Phylum: Arthropoda
- Class: Malacostraca
- Order: Isopoda
- Suborder: Oniscidea
- Family: Porcellionidae
- Genus: Porcellio
- Species: P. expansus

Binomial name
- Porcellio expansus Dollfus, 1892

Species of woodlouse

Porcellio expansus (also known as the Giant Spanish Isopod) is a species of detritivorous woodlouse in the genus Porcellio that can be found in northeast Spain.

They live from 3–5 years and reach sizes of 2.6–3.8 centimetres (1.0–1.5 in)
