= Trachelipus schwangarti =

Scientific classification
- Kingdom: Animalia
- Phylum: Arthropoda
- Class: Malacostraca
- Order: Isopoda
- Suborder: Oniscidea
- Family: Trachelipodidae
- Genus: Trachelipus
- Species: T. schwangarti

Binomial name
- Trachelipus schwangarti (Verhoeff, 1928)

Species of woodlouse

Trachelipus schwangarti is a species of woodlouse in the genus Trachelipus belonging to the family Trachelipodidae that can be found in the Alps of Austria and northern Italy.
