= Tura (isopod) =

Scientific classification
- Kingdom: Animalia
- Phylum: Arthropoda
- Clade: Pancrustacea
- Class: Malacostraca
- Order: Isopoda
- Suborder: Oniscidea
- Family: Porcellionidae
- Genus: Tura; Budde-Lund, 1908

Type species
- Porcellio (Tura) testacea Budde-Lund, 1908

Synonyms
- Porcellio (Tura) Budde-Lund, 1908

Genus of isopods

Tura is a genus of isopods in the family Porcellionidae. It was once considered a subgenus of Porcellio. There are seven species assigned to this genus:

- Tura albipennis (Budde-Lund, 1912)
- Tura angusta (Budde-Lund, 1912)
- Tura candida Ferrara, 1974
- Tura laticauda (Budde-Lund, 1912)
- Tura mesopotamica Taiti & Ferrara, 1985
- Tura nigromaculata Schmölzer, 1974
- Tura testacea (Budde-Lund, 1908)
