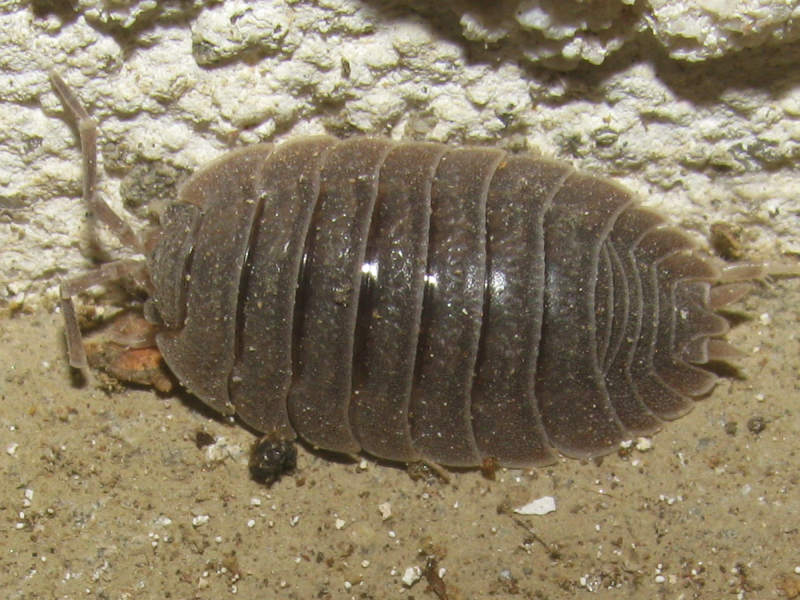

Scientific classification
- Kingdom: Animalia
- Phylum: Arthropoda
- Clade: Pancrustacea
- Class: Malacostraca
- Order: Isopoda
- Suborder: Oniscidea
- Family: Porcellionidae
- Genus: Porcellio
- Species: P. dilatatus

Binomial name
- Porcellio dilatatus Brandt, 1833

= Porcellio dilatatus =

Species of woodlouse

Porcellio dilatatus, commonly known as the giant canyon isopod, is a species of woodlouse in the genus Porcellio belonging to the family Porcellionidae. They are 15 millimetres (0.59 in) long, are brown coloured and striped. As typical for woodlice, they are saprophages, feeding on decaying organic matter, usually from plants.

== Range ==
This species is widespread in Europe, and has also been introduced to North America from Western Europe. European terrestrial isopods may have been passively introduced to the Americas as early as 1500 A.D. by exploring ships, containing holds ballasted by soils from Europe. As such, P. dilatatus was likely introduced at harbors through European immigration into North America. Past records and online digital records (iNaturalist) indicate a North American range mainly in the Northwest and Western United States. A proposed range includes California, Nevada, Oregon, Washington, Arizona, and Texas. P. dilatatus has also been recorded as a greenhouse species in the Northwest United States and in Canada, where it is widespread through transfer of plant materials but rare outside of greenhouses.This species has also been introduced to Japan, being one of the seven recorded exotic species present.

== Microbiota Symbioses ==
Much like many other saprophytic arthropods, P. dilatatus naturally host diverse populations of gut bacteria to aid in the breakdown and digestion of plant material. Autochthonous bacterial communities likely live in mutualistic or commensalistic symbioses with their hosts. Individuals may also be infected by common parasitic microbes found in arthropods such as Wolbachia and Rickettsiella.

== Pests ==
The species are considered to be house pests, that can be found in greenhouses, seed boxes, and flower pots.

== Subspecies ==
Five subspecies are recognised:

- Porcellio dilatatus bonadonai Vandel, 1951
- Porcellio dilatatus dilatatus Brandt, 1833
- Porcellio dilatatus flavus Collinge, 1917
- Porcellio dilatatus petiti Vandel, 1951
- Porcellio dilatatus rufobrunneus Collinge, 1918
