= Porcellio longicornis =

Scientific classification
- Kingdom: Animalia
- Phylum: Arthropoda
- Class: Malacostraca
- Order: Isopoda
- Suborder: Oniscidea
- Family: Porcellionidae
- Genus: Porcellio
- Species: P. longicornis

Binomial name
- Porcellio longicornis Stein, 1859

Species of woodlouse

Porcellio longicornis is a species of woodlouse. This species was described by Johann Philip Emil Friedrich Stein in 1859. It is found in Bosnia and Herzegovina, Croatia, and Montenegro.
