= Porcellio siculoccidentalis =

Scientific classification
- Kingdom: Animalia
- Phylum: Arthropoda
- Class: Malacostraca
- Order: Isopoda
- Suborder: Oniscidea
- Family: Porcellionidae
- Genus: Porcellio
- Species: P. siculoccidentalis

Binomial name
- Porcellio siculoccidentalis Viglianisi, Lombardo & Caruso, 1992

Species of woodlouse

Porcellio siculoccidentalis is a species of woodlouse in the genus Porcellio (family Porcellionidae), which is endemic to western Sicily.
