= Porcellio formosus =

Scientific classification
- Kingdom: Animalia
- Phylum: Arthropoda
- Class: Malacostraca
- Order: Isopoda
- Suborder: Oniscidea
- Family: Porcellionidae
- Genus: Porcellio
- Species: P. formosus

Binomial name
- Porcellio formosus Stuxberg, 1875

Species of woodlouse

Porcellio formosus is a species of woodlouse in the genus Porcellio belonging to the family Porcellionidae that can be found in San Pedro and San Francisco of California.

== Description ==
The species are 13 by 6 millimetres (0.51 in × 0.24 in) high and wide, with the antennae segments are as long as 6 millimetres (0.24 in). Their longitudinal band is grayish-white, and have a series of spots which are of the same colour. The body is ovate, with a long, shining, and smooth convex. The eyes are oval shaped, prominent, and have many ocelli. The little developed median frontal lobe is rounded. The drawn out lateral lobes are equal in length and width of the eyes or the face. Both epimera, posterior margin, posterior angles, and the first three segments of the thorax are straight. The fifth, sixth, and seventh segments are bent backwards. The semicircular abdomen of the fifth segment is wide, while epimera on the parts three, four, and five are quite large, but still bent backward. The seventh segment is triangular in shape, and is wide and long.

The species also have a wide, and acuminate apex, which also have a broad longitudinal excavation which is located above the apex. The basal part of the uropoda can be seen from below, with the convex being always above. The dorsal part is dark greyish-red in colour, and have many irregular and pale coloured oblong spots. The spots are mixed and are arranged in two lines, which are divided by an interval. The colour of abdomen is the same as the rest of the body, and are either bi-punctate or tri-punctate at the base.
