= Porcellio gallicus =

Scientific classification
- Kingdom: Animalia
- Phylum: Arthropoda
- Class: Malacostraca
- Order: Isopoda
- Suborder: Oniscidea
- Family: Porcellionidae
- Genus: Porcellio
- Species: P. gallicus

Binomial name
- Porcellio gallicus Dollfus, 1904

Species of woodlouse

Porcellio gallicus is a species of woodlouse in the genus Porcellio belonging to the family Porcellionidae that can be found in France, Italy, Spain, and Switzerland.
