= Trachelipus difficilis =

Scientific classification
- Kingdom: Animalia
- Phylum: Arthropoda
- Class: Malacostraca
- Order: Isopoda
- Suborder: Oniscidea
- Family: Trachelipodidae
- Genus: Trachelipus
- Species: T. difficilis

Binomial name
- Trachelipus difficilis (Radu, 1950)

Synonyms
- Porcellio difficilis; Tracheoniscus difficilis; Tracheoniscus waechtleri; Trachelipus waechtleri

Species of woodlouse

Trachelipus difficilis is a species of woodlouse in the genus Trachelipus belonging to the family Trachelipodidae that can be found in Hungary, Romania and Slovakia.
