= Porcellio novus =

Scientific classification
- Kingdom: Animalia
- Phylum: Arthropoda
- Class: Malacostraca
- Order: Isopoda
- Suborder: Oniscidea
- Family: Porcellionidae
- Genus: Porcellio
- Species: P. novus

Binomial name
- Porcellio novus Arcangeli, 1936

Species of woodlouse

Porcellio novus is a species of woodlouse in the genus Porcellio belonging to the family Porcellionidae that can be found in Portugal and Spain.
