= Trachelipus palustris =

Scientific classification
- Kingdom: Animalia
- Phylum: Arthropoda
- Class: Malacostraca
- Order: Isopoda
- Suborder: Oniscidea
- Family: Trachelipodidae
- Genus: Trachelipus
- Species: T. palustris

Binomial name
- Trachelipus palustris (Strouhal, 1929)

Synonyms
- Trachelipus graecus; Tracheoniscus palustris

Species of woodlouse

Trachelipus palustris is a species of woodlouse in the genus Trachelipus that can be found on islands like Crete and Cyclades, and also in mainland Greece.
