= Porcellio nigrogranulatus =

Scientific classification
- Kingdom: Animalia
- Phylum: Arthropoda
- Class: Malacostraca
- Order: Isopoda
- Suborder: Oniscidea
- Family: Porcellionidae
- Genus: Porcellio
- Species: P. nigrogranulatus

Binomial name
- Porcellio nigrogranulatus Dollfus, 1892

Species of woodlouse

Porcellio nigrogranulatus is a species of woodlouse in the genus Porcellio belonging to the family Porcellionidae that can be found on Balearic Islands and mainland Spain.
