= Sinodillo =

Scientific classification
- Kingdom: Animalia
- Phylum: Arthropoda
- Clade: Pancrustacea
- Class: Malacostraca
- Order: Isopoda
- Suborder: Oniscidea
- Family: Armadillidae
- Genus: Sinodillo; Kwon & Taiti, 1993

Type species
- Sinodillo troglophilus Kwon & Taiti, 1993

Genus of woodlice

Sinodillo is a genus of woodlice belonging to the family Armadillidae. This genus was described in 1993 by Do Heon Kwon and Stefano Taiti. The type specimen for this species is S. troglophilus from Chinshui County in Yunnan Province, China. There are currently six species in this genus.

== Description ==
Sinodillo spp. are able to fully conglobate. Each of their pereon segment has a single small nodule on each side, with all nodules aligned in a similar position, away from the segment edges. The head has a frontal lamina (head plate) that does not extend above the top of the head. The first pereon segment has a normal, unthickened epimera (side plate), that curves outward, forming a noticeable rounded lobe on the underside. The second pereon segment has a transverse ventral lobe. The telson ends in a squared-off tip.

They have pleopodal exopods similar to those found in the genus Trachelipus. The base of the uropod has a short outer branch that is positioned dorsally, just below a small central tooth.

=== Remarks on similar genera ===
The genus Sinodillo is similar to the genera Bethalus, Barnardillo, Cubaris, and Troglodillo in the presence of ventral lobes on epimera of the first and second pereon segments. It is distinguished from these genera by the Trachelipus-type, instead of tubular, pleopodal lungs, and the positioning and form of the uropod.

== Distribution ==
This genus has only been found in China.

== Species ==
There are currently six species in this genus:

- Sinodillo ferrarai Kwon & Taiti 1993
- Sinodillo goaligongshanensis Nunomura & Xie, 2000
- Sinodillo longistylus Nunomura & Xie, 2000
- Sinodillo schalfussi Kwon & Taiti 1993
- Sinodillo troglophilus Kwon & Taiti 1993
- Sinodillo tuberculatus Nunomura & Xie, 2000

== Etymology ==
This genus is so named for the Latin "Sino" meaning "China" plus the suffix "-dillo" which is common in armadillid isopods.
