= Porcellio ovalis =

Scientific classification
- Kingdom: Animalia
- Phylum: Arthropoda
- Class: Malacostraca
- Order: Isopoda
- Suborder: Oniscidea
- Family: Porcellionidae
- Genus: Porcellio
- Species: P. ovalis

Binomial name
- Porcellio ovalis Dollfus, 1893

Species of woodlouse

Porcellio ovalis is a species of woodlouse in the family Porcellionidae. It is endemic to the Canary Islands.
