= Trachelipus camerani =

Scientific classification
- Kingdom: Animalia
- Phylum: Arthropoda
- Class: Malacostraca
- Order: Isopoda
- Suborder: Oniscidea
- Family: Trachelipodidae
- Genus: Trachelipus
- Species: T. camerani

Binomial name
- Trachelipus camerani (Tua, 1900)

Synonyms
- Porcellio camerani; Porcellio phaeacorum; Porcellio rathkii phaeacorum; Porcellio ratzeburgi illyricus; Tracelipus apulicus; Tracelipus illyricus; Tracelipus phaeacorum; Tracheoniscus apulicus; Tracheoniscus camerani

Species of woodlouse

Trachelipus camerani is a species of woodlouse in the genus Trachelipus belonging to the family Trachelipodidae that can be found in Italy, Greece and the former Yugoslavia.
