= Trachelipus mostarensis =

Scientific classification
- Kingdom: Animalia
- Phylum: Arthropoda
- Class: Malacostraca
- Order: Isopoda
- Suborder: Oniscidea
- Family: Trachelipodidae
- Genus: Trachelipus
- Species: T. mostarensis

Binomial name
- Trachelipus mostarensis (Verhoeff, 1901)

Synonyms
- Porcellio mostarensis; Porcellio rathkei var. mostarensis; Tracheoniscus mostarensis

Species of woodlouse

Trachelipus mostarensis is a species of woodlouse in the genus Trachelipus belonging to the family Trachelipodidae that can be found in Bosnia and Herzegovina and Croatia.
