= Trachelipus aegaeus =

Scientific classification
- Kingdom: Animalia
- Phylum: Arthropoda
- Class: Malacostraca
- Order: Isopoda
- Suborder: Oniscidea
- Family: Trachelipodidae
- Genus: Trachelipus
- Species: T. aegaeus

Binomial name
- Trachelipus aegaeus (Verhoeff, 1908)

Synonyms
- Porcellio aegaeus Verhoeff, 1907

Species of woodlouse

Trachelipus aegaeus is a species of woodlouse in the genus Trachelipus belonging to the family Trachelipodidae that can be found in the Cyclades and in mainland Greece.
