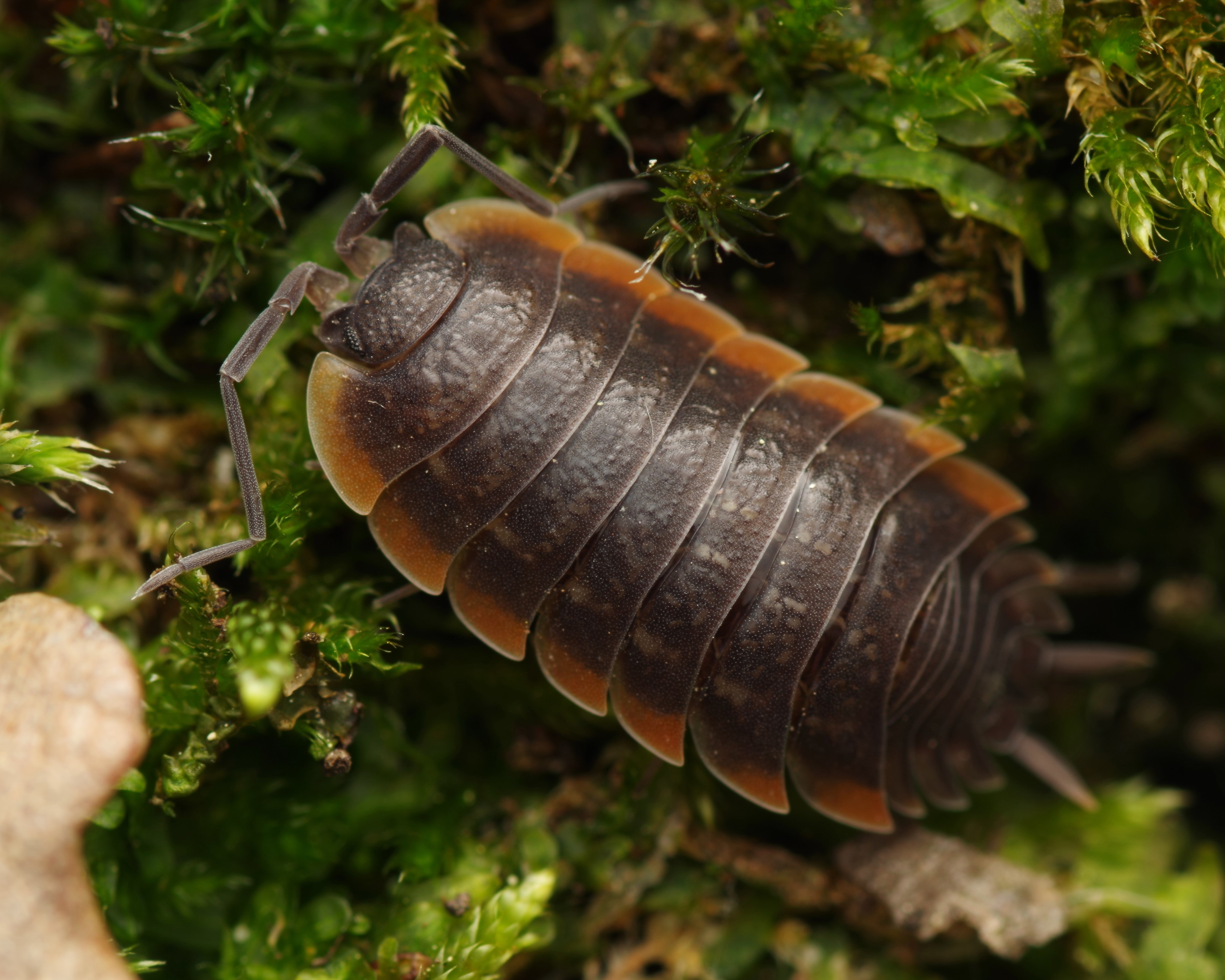
- Porcellio duboscqui

Scientific classification
- Kingdom: Animalia
- Phylum: Arthropoda
- Class: Malacostraca
- Order: Isopoda
- Suborder: Oniscidea
- Family: Porcellionidae
- Genus: Porcellio
- Species: P. duboscqui

Binomial name
- Porcellio duboscqui Paulian de Felice, 1941

= Porcellio duboscqui =

Species of woodlouse

Porcellio duboscqui is a species of woodlouse in the genus Porcellio belonging to the family Porcellionidae that can be found in France and Spain.
