= Porcellio krivosijensis =

Scientific classification
- Kingdom: Animalia
- Phylum: Arthropoda
- Class: Malacostraca
- Order: Isopoda
- Suborder: Oniscidea
- Family: Porcellionidae
- Genus: Porcellio
- Species: P. krivosijensis

Binomial name
- Porcellio krivosijensis Strouhal, 1939

Species of woodlouse

Porcellio krivosijensis is a species of woodlouse in the family Porcellionidae. It is found in Montenegro.

== Distribution ==
This species is endemic to southern Montenegro.
