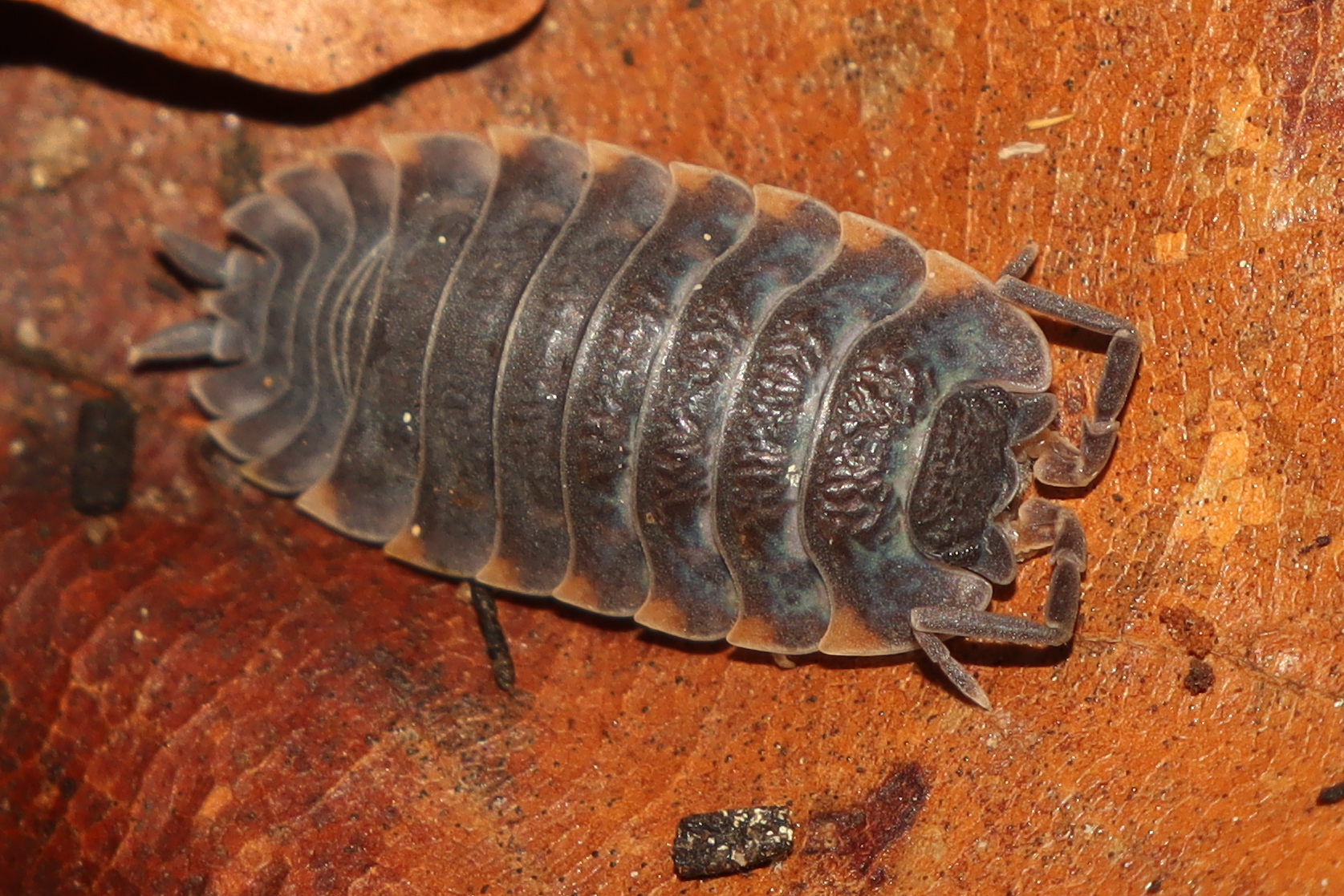

Scientific classification
- Kingdom: Animalia
- Phylum: Arthropoda
- Class: Malacostraca
- Order: Isopoda
- Suborder: Oniscidea
- Family: Trachelipodidae
- Genus: Trachelipus
- Species: T. ratzeburgii

Binomial name
- Trachelipus ratzeburgii (Brandt, 1833)

Synonyms
- Porcellio ratzeburgii; Tracheoniscus ratzeburgii

= Trachelipus ratzeburgii =

Species of woodlouse

Trachelipus ratzeburgii is a species of woodlouse in the genus Trachelipus belonging to the family Trachelipodidae that can be found in Austria, the Baltic states, Belgium, the Netherlands, Slovenia, Croatia, the Czech Republic, France, Germany, Hungary, Italy, Poland, Romania, Slovakia, Switzerland and Scandinavia (except for Finland). The species has three subspecies:

- Trachelipus ratzeburgii illyricus (Verhoeff, 1901)
- Trachelipus ratzeburgii pedemontanus (Arcangeli, 1937)
- Trachelipus ratzeburgii ratzeburgii (Brandt, 1833)

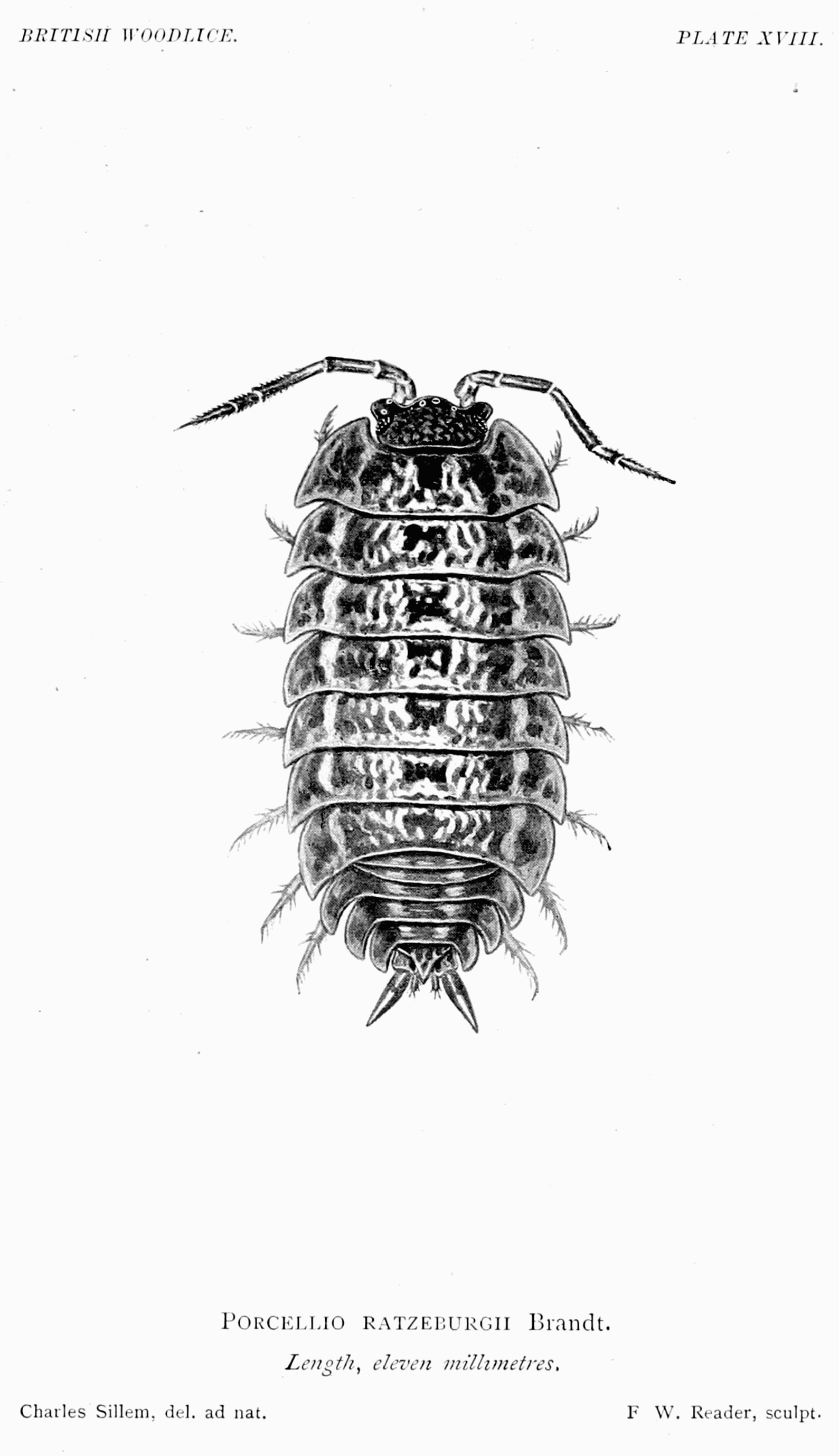
Illustration from 1906
