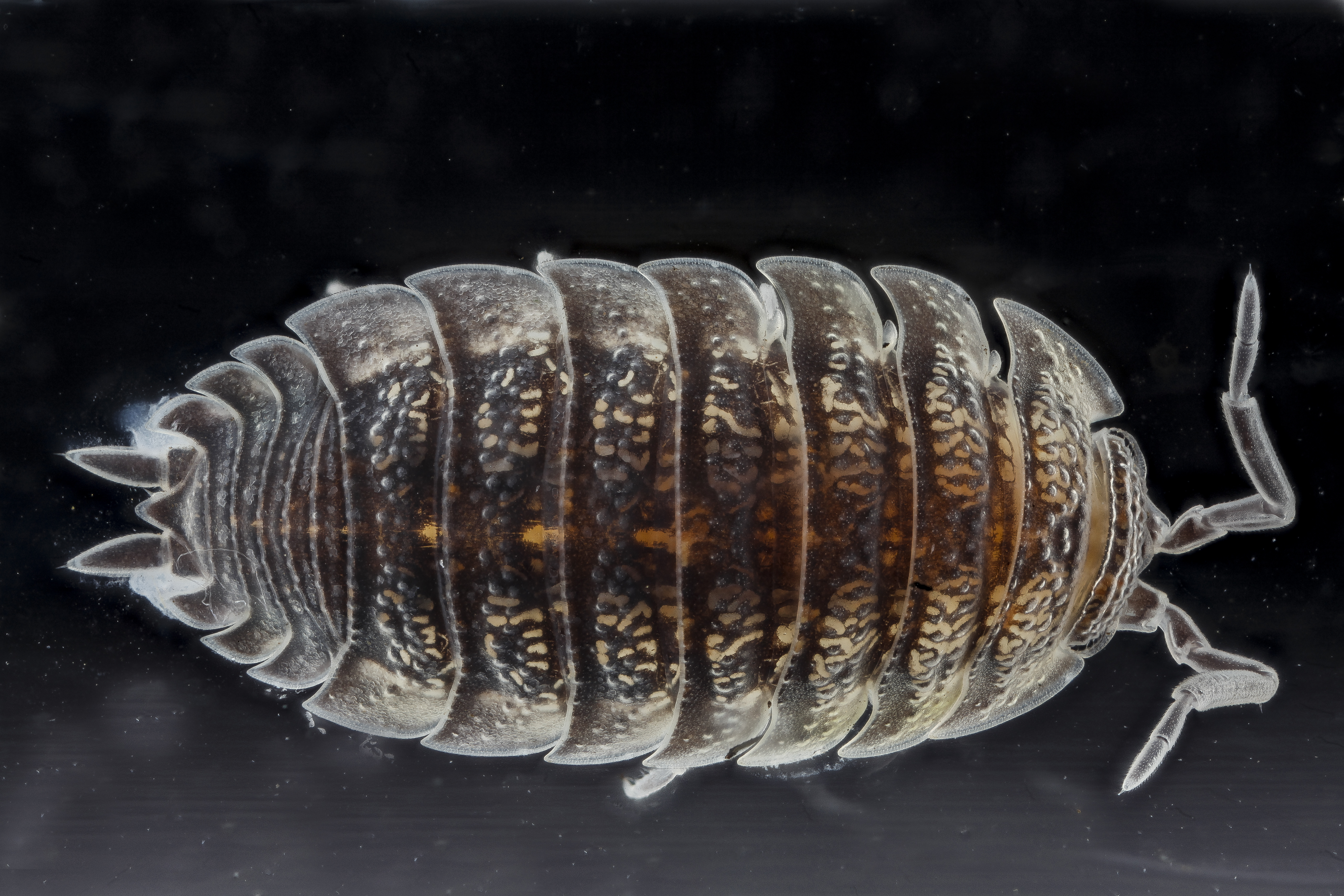
- Trachelipus rathkii

Scientific classification
- Kingdom: Animalia
- Phylum: Arthropoda
- Class: Malacostraca
- Order: Isopoda
- Suborder: Oniscidea
- Family: Trachelipodidae
- Genus: Trachelipus; Budde-Lund, 1908

= Trachelipus =

Genus of woodlice

Trachelipus is a genus of woodlice in the family Trachelipodidae, containing the following species:

- Trachelipus aegaeus (Verhoeff, 1907)
- Trachelipus aetnensis (Verhoeff, 1908)
- Trachelipus anatolicus (Frankenberger, 1950)
- Trachelipus andrei (Arcangeli, 1939)
- Trachelipus arcuatus (Budde-Lund, 1885)
- Trachelipus armenicus Borutzkii, 1976
- Trachelipus ater (Budde-Lund, 1896)
- Trachelipus azerbaidzhanus Schmalfuss, 1986
- Trachelipus bistriatus (Budde-Lund, 1885)
- Trachelipus buddelundi (Strouhal, 1937)
- Trachelipus camerani (Tua, 1900)
- Trachelipus caucasius (Verhoeff, 1918)
- Trachelipus cavaticus Schmalfuss, Paragamian & Sfenthourakis, 2004
- Trachelipus croaticus Karaman, 1967
- Trachelipus difficilis Radu, 1950
- Trachelipus dimorphus (Frankenberger, 1941)
- Trachelipus emaciatus (Budde-Lund, 1885)
- Trachelipus ensiculorum (Verhoeff, 1949)
- Trachelipus gagriensis (Verhoeff, 1918)
- Trachelipus graecus Strouhal, 1938
- Trachelipus kervillei (Arcangeli, 1939)
- Trachelipus kosswigi (Verhoeff, 1943)
- Trachelipus laoshanensis Biping, Hong & Tian, 1994
- Trachelipus lencoranicus Borutzky, 1976
- Trachelipus lignaui (Verhoeff, 1918)
- Trachelipus longipennis (Budde-Lund, 1885)
- Trachelipus lutshniki (Verhoeff, 1933)
- Trachelipus marsupiorum (Verhoeff, 1943)
- Trachelipus mostarensis (Verhoeff, 1901)
- Trachelipus myrmicidarum (Verhoeff, 1936)
- Trachelipus nassonovi (Korcagin, 1888)
- Trachelipus nodulosus (Koch, 1838)
- Trachelipus ottomanicus Vandel, 1980
- Trachelipus palustris (Strouhal, 1937)
- Trachelipus pedesignatus (Verhoeff, 1949)
- Trachelipus pieperi Schmalfuss, 1986
- Trachelipus pierantonii (Arcangeli, 1932)
- Trachelipus planarius (Budde-Lund, 1885)
- Trachelipus porisabditus Verhoeff & Strouhal, 1967
- Trachelipus radui Tomescu & Olariu, 2000
- Trachelipus rathkii (Brandt, 1833)
- Trachelipus ratzeburgii (Brandt, 1833)
- Trachelipus razzautii (Arcangeli, 1913)
- Trachelipus remyi (Verhoeff, 1933)
- Trachelipus rhinoceros (Budde-Lund, 1885)
- Trachelipus richardsonae Mulaik, 1960
- Trachelipus riparianus (Verhoeff, 1936)
- Trachelipus rucneri Karaman, 1967
- Trachelipus sarculatus (Budde-Lund, 1896)
- Trachelipus sarmaticus Borutzkii, 1976
- Trachelipus schwangarti (Verhoeff, 1928)
- Trachelipus semiproiectus Gui & Tang, 1996
- Trachelipus silsilesii Vandel, 1980
- Trachelipus similis Vandel, 1980
- Trachelipus simplex Vandel, 1980
- Trachelipus spinulatus (Radu, 1959)
- Trachelipus spretus (Budde-Lund, 1885)
- Trachelipus squamuliger (Verhoeff, 1907)
- Trachelipus svenhedini (Verhoeff, 1941)
- Trachelipus taborskyi (Frankenberger, 1950)
- Trachelipus trachealis (Budde-Lund, 1885)
- Trachelipus trilobatus (Stein, 1859)
- Trachelipus troglobius Tabacaru & Boghean, 1989
- Trachelipus utrishensis Gongalsky, 2017
- Trachelipus vespertilio (Budde-Lund, 1896)
