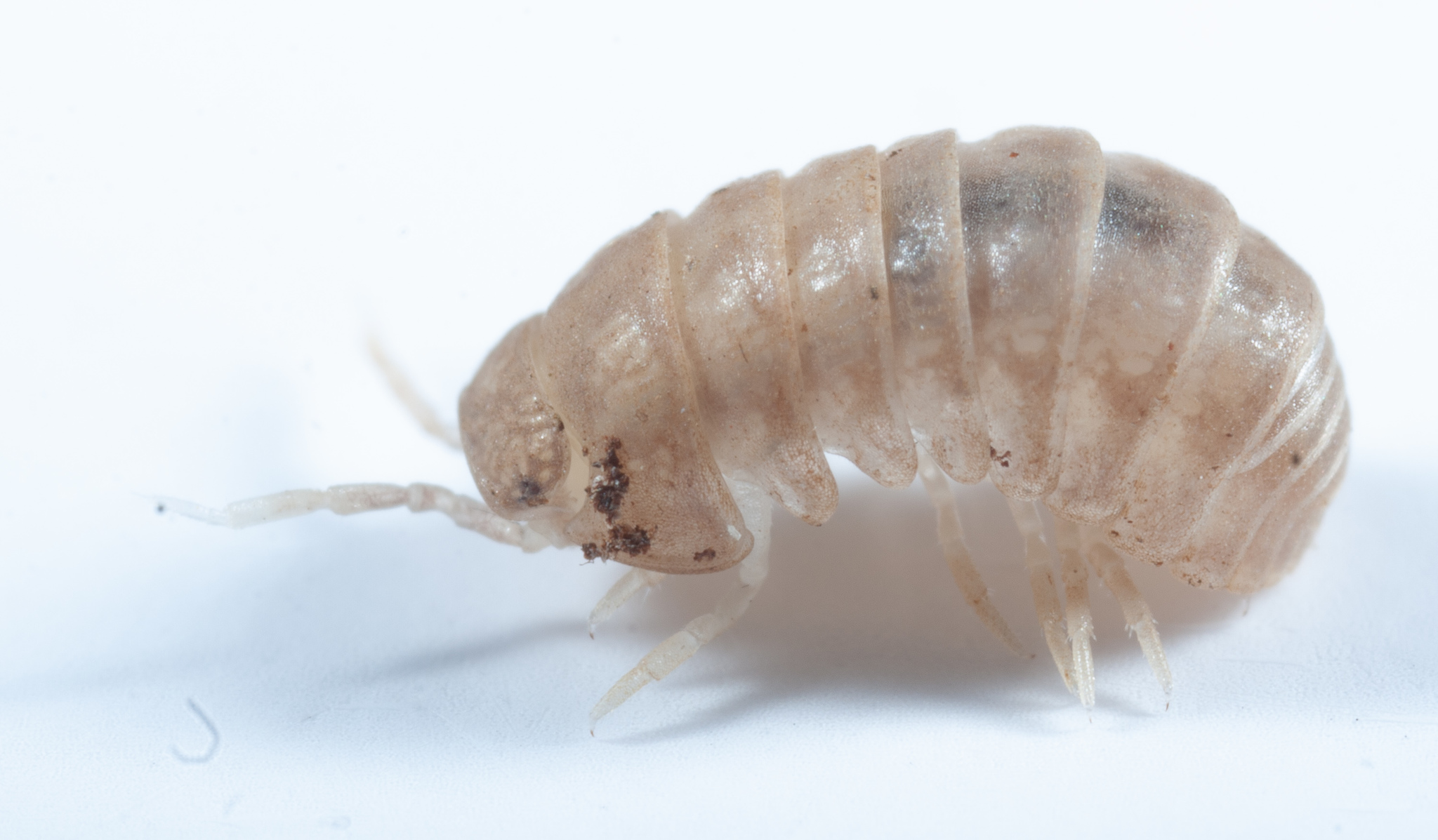

Scientific classification
- Kingdom: Animalia
- Phylum: Arthropoda
- Class: Malacostraca
- Order: Isopoda
- Suborder: Oniscidea
- Family: Armadillidae
- Genus: Venezillo
- Species: V. microphthalmus

Binomial name
- Venezillo microphthalmus (Arcangeli, 1932)

Synonyms
- Armadillo microphtalmus Arcangeli, 1932; Armadillo microphthalmus Arcangeli, 1932

= Venezillo microphthalmus =

Species of crustaceans

Venezillo microphthalmus is a species of woodlouse within the family Armadillidae. The species is located in California. It is considered rare on the mainland, although it also has previous records from the Channel Islands. It is believed to be declining in the Bay Area due to undergoing displacement from introduced species.
