= Venezillo arizonicus =

Scientific classification
- Kingdom: Animalia
- Phylum: Arthropoda
- Class: Malacostraca
- Order: Isopoda
- Suborder: Oniscidea
- Family: Armadillidae
- Genus: Venezillo
- Species: V. arizonicus

Binomial name
- Venezillo arizonicus (S. Mulaik & D. Mulaik, 1942)

Species of woodlouse

Venezillo arizonicus is a species of woodlouse in the family Armadillidae. It is found in Southern Arizona, USA.

The Venezillo arizonicus species has a lower permeability to water loss relative to most other Oniscidea.
