= Porcellio zarcoi =

Scientific classification
- Kingdom: Animalia
- Phylum: Arthropoda
- Class: Malacostraca
- Order: Isopoda
- Suborder: Oniscidea
- Family: Porcellionidae
- Genus: Porcellionides
- Species: P. zarcoi

Binomial name
- Porcellionides zarcoi (Vandel, 1960)

Synonyms
- Porcellio zarcoi

Species of woodlouse

Porcellio zarcoi is a species of woodlouse in the Porcellionidae family that is endemic to Madeira.
