= Lucasius =

Scientific classification
- Kingdom: Animalia
- Phylum: Arthropoda
- Clade: Pancrustacea
- Class: Malacostraca
- Order: Isopoda
- Suborder: Oniscidea
- Family: Porcellionidae
- Genus: Lucasius; Kinahan, 1859

Genus of woodlice

Lucasius is a genus of woodlice in the family Porcellionidae. It includes the following species:

- Lucasius myrmecophilus Kinahan, 1859
- Lucasius pallidus (Budde-Lund, 1885)
- Lucasius andalusicus Garcia, 2019
