= Soteriscus =

Scientific classification
- Kingdom: Animalia
- Phylum: Arthropoda
- Class: Malacostraca
- Order: Isopoda
- Suborder: Oniscidea
- Family: Porcellionidae
- Genus: Soteriscus; Vandel, 1956

Genus of woodlice

Soteriscus is a genus of woodlice in the family Porcellionidae found in Macaronesian islands and adjacent parts of Europe and Africa. It contains the following species:

- Soteriscus bremondi Vandel, 1960 – Madeira
- Soteriscus brumdocantoi Vandel, 1960 – Madeira: Porto Santo Island
- Soteriscus desertarum Vandel, 1960 – Madeira: Desertas Islands
- Soteriscus disimilis Rodríguez, 1990 – Canary Islands: Lanzarote, Lobos Island and Fuerteventura
- Soteriscus fructuosi Vandel, 1960 – Madeira: Porto Santo Island
- Soteriscus fuscovariegatus (Lucas, 1849) – northern Algeria
- Soteriscus gaditanus Vandel, 1956 – southern Spain: Tarifa; northwestern Morocco
- Soteriscus madeirae Arcangeli, 1958 – Madeira
- Soteriscus mateui Vandel, 1957 – Cape Verde
- Soteriscus porcellioniformis Vandel, 1960 – Madeira: Porto Santo Island
- Soteriscus relictus Vandel, 1960 – Madeira: Islote de Desembarcadouro
- Soteriscus stricticauda (Dollfus, 1893) – western Canary Islands
- Soteriscus trilineatus Rodríguez & Vicente, 1992 – Canary Islands: La Gomera
- Soteriscus virescens (Budde-Lund, 1885) – northwestern Morocco
- Soteriscus wollastoni (Paulian de Félice, 1939) – Madeira
