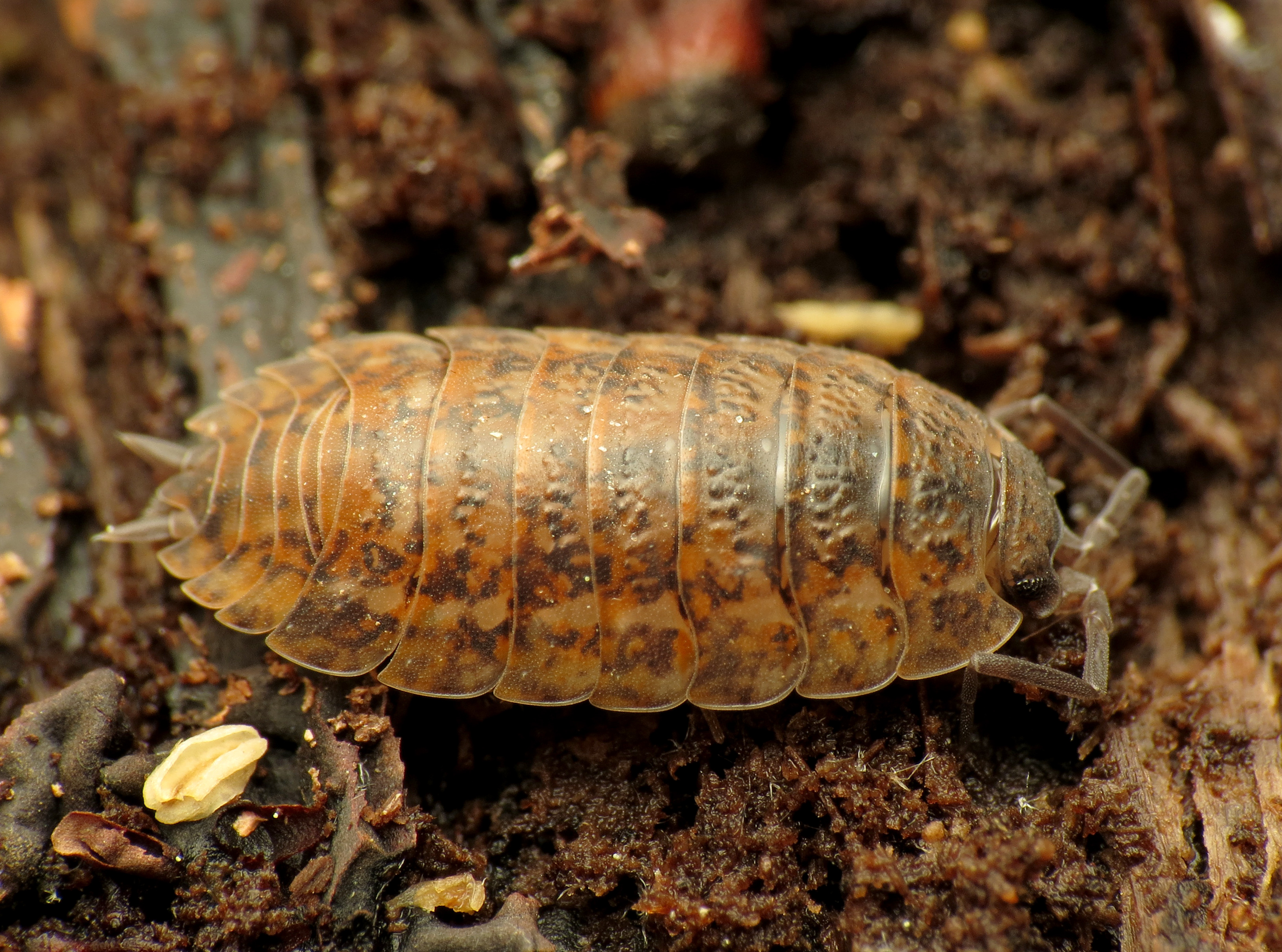

Scientific classification
- Kingdom: Animalia
- Phylum: Arthropoda
- Clade: Pancrustacea
- Class: Malacostraca
- Order: Isopoda
- Suborder: Oniscidea
- Family: Trachelipodidae
- Genus: Trachelipus
- Species: T. rathkii

Binomial name
- Trachelipus rathkii (Brandt, 1833)

Synonyms
- Porcellio affinis C. Koch, 1841; Porcellio confluens C. Koch, 1841; Porcellio ochraceus C. Koch, 1841; Porcellio parietinus L. Koch, 1901; Porcellio rathkii Brandt, 1833; Porcellio striatus Schnitzler, 1853; Porcellio sylvestris C. Koch, 1838; Porcellio taeniatus Schöbl, 1861; Porcellio trilineatus C. Koch, 1841; Porcellio varius C. Koch, 1841; Trachelipus affinis (C. Koch, 1841); Trachelipus pleonglandulatus Radu, 1950

= Trachelipus rathkii =

Species of woodlouse

Trachelipus rathkii, also known as Rathke's woodlouse, is a species of woodlouse in the genus Trachelipus (family Trachelipodidae). It can be found across Europe, except in the Mediterranean Basin. It has also been introduced to North America, where it can be found across most of the northern half of the United States and southern Canada. They have been recorded as far west as Alberta.

== Description ==
Rathke's woodlice grow to 15mm long. Its body is usually slate grey, often with pale longitudinal markings that create the appearance of three thin stripes. Females may show orange mottling. T. rathkii have five pairs of pleopodal lungs and two antennal flagellar segments.

== Habitat ==
T. rathkii prefers poorly drained, damp habitats and is tolerant of flooding, making it characteristic of riverside meadows and floodplains, where it may be the dominant woodlouse. It also occurs in scrub, soft eroding cliffs, gravel pits, and churchyards, sheltering under stones and dead wood, beneath bark, in grass litter, tussocks, and flood debris.
