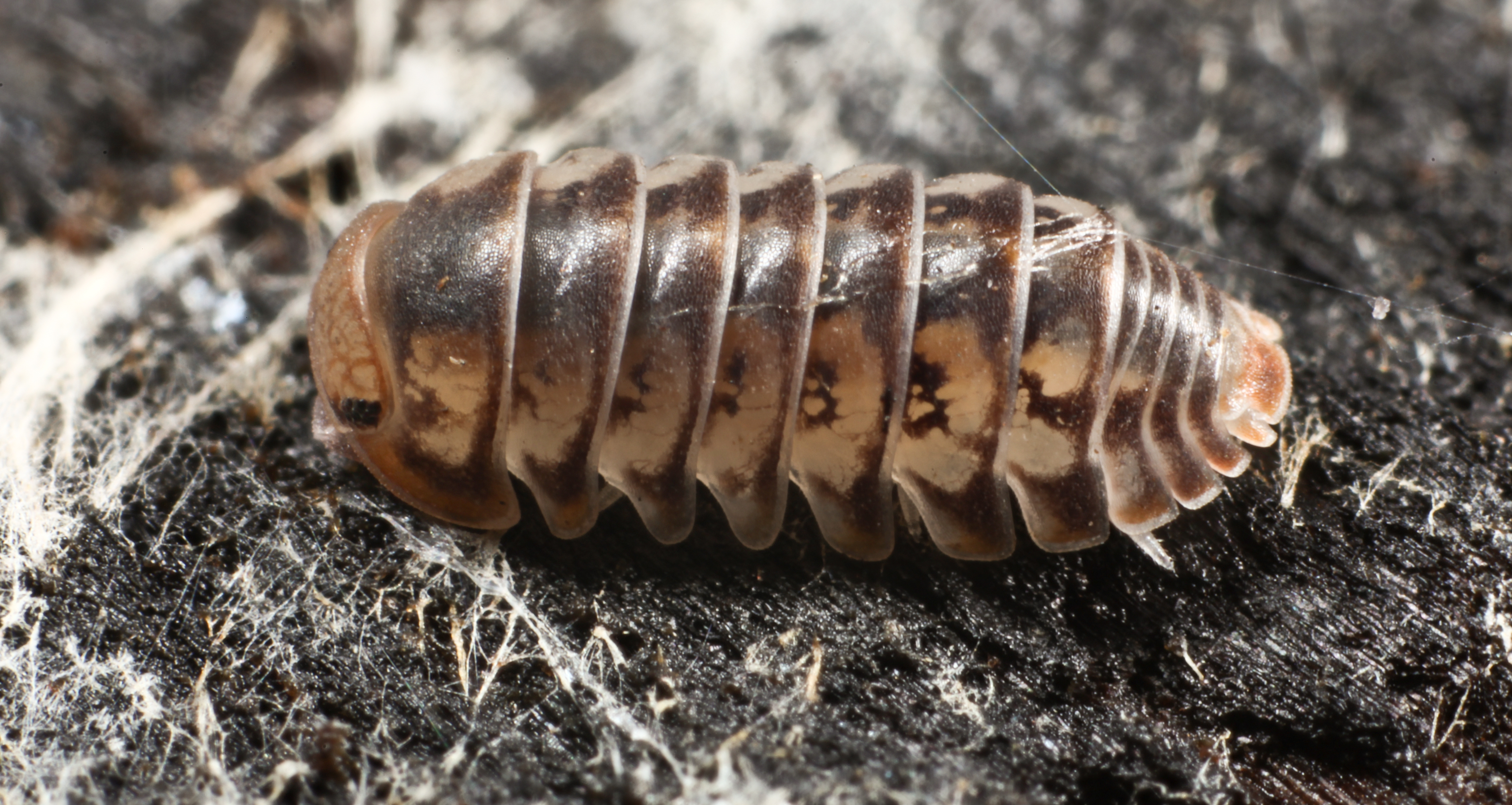

Scientific classification
- Kingdom: Animalia
- Phylum: Arthropoda
- Class: Malacostraca
- Order: Isopoda
- Suborder: Oniscidea
- Family: Armadillidae
- Genus: Venezillo
- Species: V. parvus

Binomial name
- Venezillo parvus (Budde-Lund, 1885)

= Venezillo parvus =

Species of crustacean

Venezillo parvus is a species of woodlouse in the family Armadillidae. It is found in North America and Europe.
