= Mahehia =

Scientific classification
- Kingdom: Animalia
- Phylum: Arthropoda
- Class: Malacostraca
- Order: Isopoda
- Suborder: Oniscidea
- Family: incertae sedis
- Genus: Mahehia; Budde-Lund, 1913

Genera
- See text

Genus of woodlice

Mahehia is a genus of woodlice which is endemic to the Seychelles. It contains the following species:

- Mahehia bicornis Budde-Lund, 1913
- Mahehia laticauda Budde-Lund, 1913
- Mahehia maculata Budde-Lund, 1913
