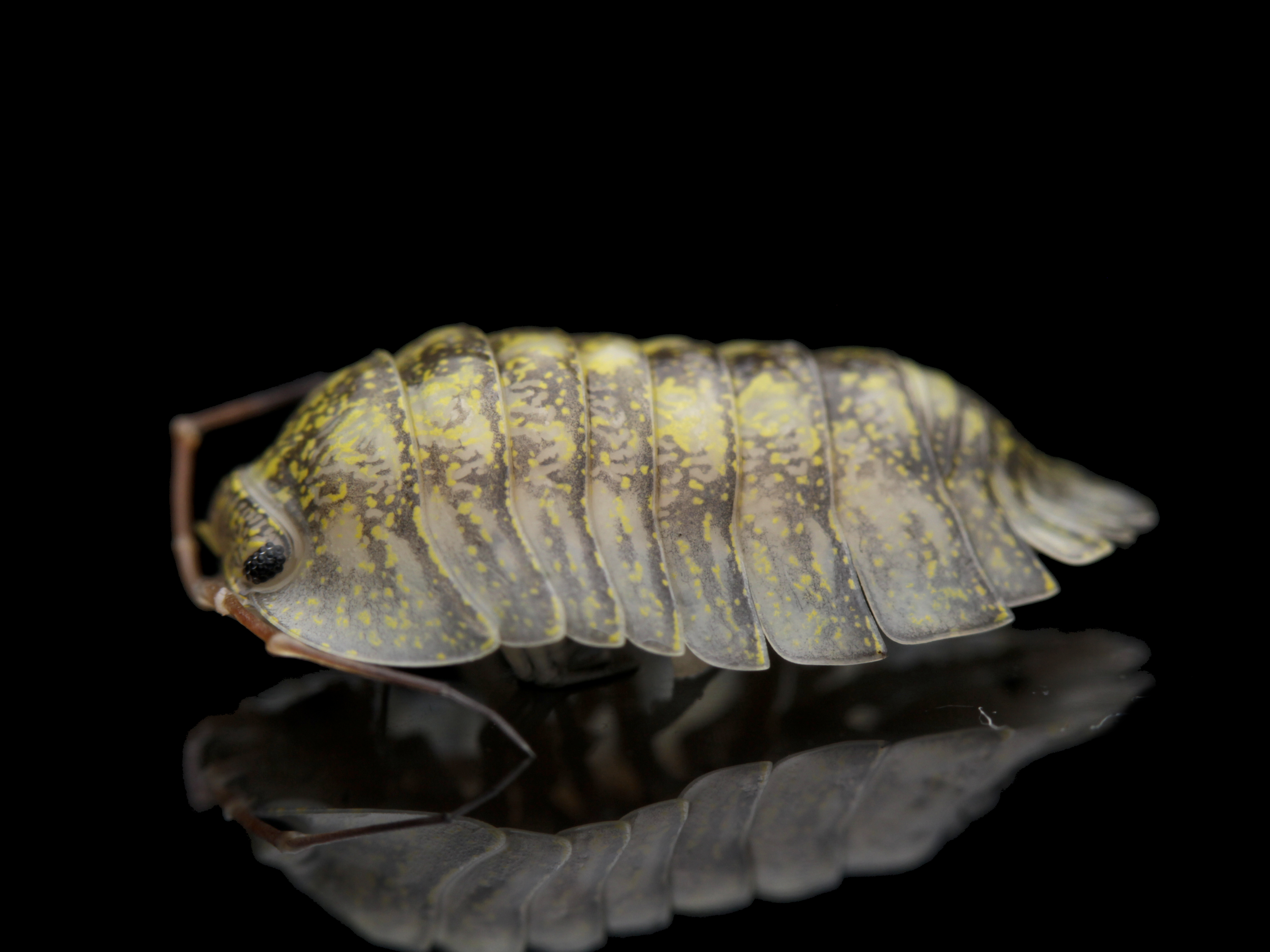
- Troglodillo sp.

Scientific classification
- Kingdom: Animalia
- Phylum: Arthropoda
- Clade: Pancrustacea
- Class: Malacostraca
- Order: Isopoda
- Suborder: Oniscidea
- Family: Armadillidae
- Genus: Troglodillo; Jackson, 1937

= Troglodillo =

Genus of isopods

Troglodillo is a genus of isopods belonging to the family Armadillidae. This genus was described in 1937 by Harold Gordon Jackson. The type specimen of this genus is a Troglodillo emarginatus that was found in Northern Thailand. There are currently three species in this genus.

== Description ==
The pronotum of Troglodillo is narrow and the postero-lateral angles are well developed. The posterior margin of the abdomen has the semicircular shape typical of conglobating forms of isopods though this genus has a reduced ability to conglobate. They have tubular pleopodal lungs. Their eyes are not reduced as is found in some cave-dwelling isopods.

=== Remarks on similar genera ===
The genus Troglodillo is similar to the genus Sinodillo in the presence of ventral lobes on the epimera (side plates) of the first and second pereon segments. These genera differ in their pleopodal lung structure.

== Distribution ==
Troglodillo have been found in caves in China and Thailand.

== Species ==
There are three species currently assigned to this genus:

- Troglodillo emarginatus Jackson, 1937
- Troglodillo latellai Taiti & Gruber, 2008
- Troglodillo rotundatus Kwon & Taiti, 1993
