= Entomologisk Forening =

Danish learned society

The Entomologisk Forening is the main entomological society in Denmark. It was founded in 1868, and resides in Copenhagen.

Among its activities is publishing the Danish languaged journal 'Entomologiske Meddelelser', which mainly publishes articles about the Danish insect fauna.
