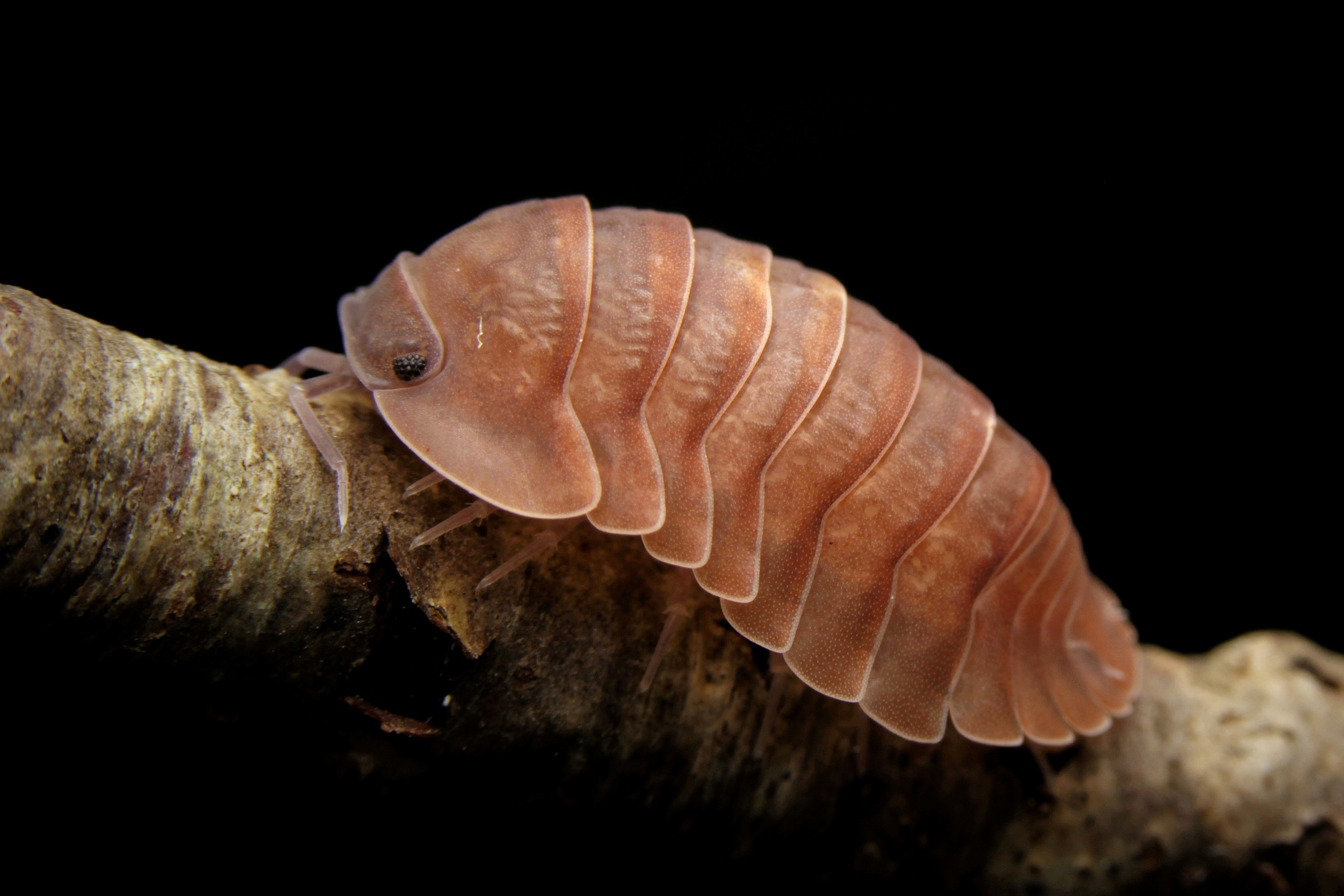
- Caribodillo martinicensis on wood

Scientific classification
- Kingdom: Animalia
- Phylum: Arthropoda
- Clade: Pancrustacea
- Class: Malacostraca
- Order: Isopoda
- Suborder: Oniscidea
- Family: Armadillidae
- Genus: Caribodillo; Kästle, Binder, Jones & Coulis, 2025
- Species: C. martinicensis

Binomial name
- Caribodillo martinicensis Kästle, Binder, Jones & Coulis, 2025

= Caribodillo =

Genus of woodlice

Caribodillo is a genus of woodlice belonging to the family Armadillidae. This genus was described in 2025 by Benedikt Kästle, Stephanie Binder, Nathan Jones, and Mathieu Coulis. The type specimen for this species is a Caribodillo martinicensis from the summit of Morne Manioc in Sainte-Anne, Martinique, and it is the only species in this genus.

== Description ==
Caribodillo are able to fully conglobate. Their bodies are convex with flattened epimera. Their dorsal surface is smooth and covered with small setae. Their cephalon has a protruding shield. Their first and second thoracic segment have a ventral lobe. Their first to seventh segments each have one row of raised bumps. Their telson is hourglass shaped. Their uropod has a rectangular end.

Their pleon also glows under 365nm UV light.

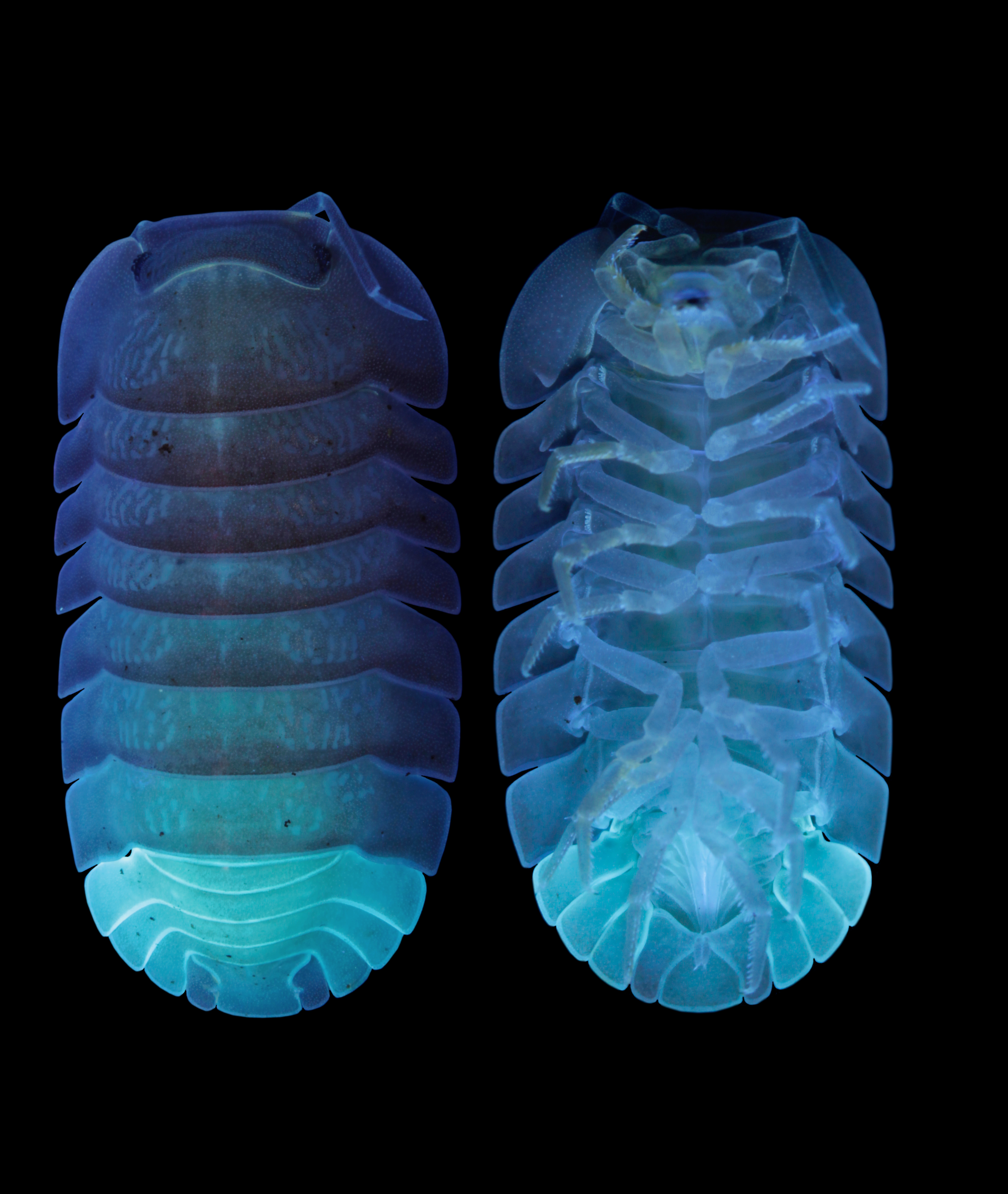
Caribodillo martinicensis (male) under 365nm UV light

== Etymology ==
The name Caribodillo refers to the Caribbean, where Martinique is located, combined with -dillo, a suffix commonly used for members of the family Armadillidae.

== Species ==
- Caribodillo martinicensis Kästle, Binder, Jones & Coulis, 2025

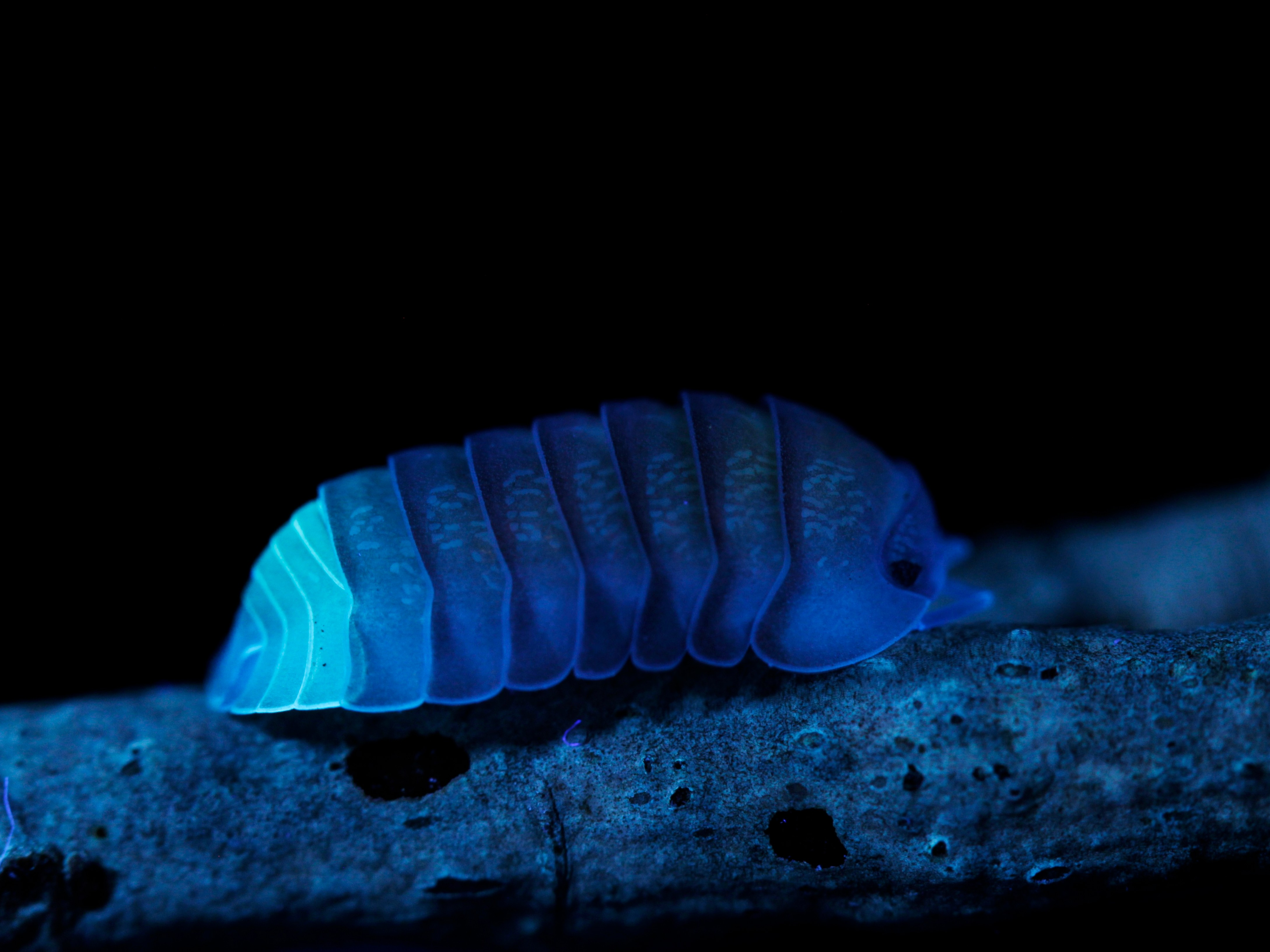
Caribodillo martinicensis (male) under 365nm UV light
