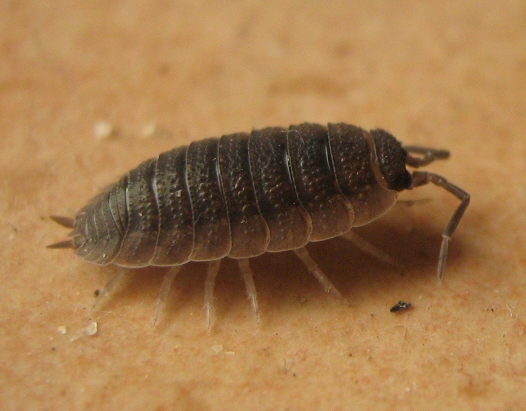
- Porcellio scaber

Scientific classification
- Kingdom: Animalia
- Phylum: Arthropoda
- Clade: Pancrustacea
- Class: Malacostraca
- Order: Isopoda
- Suborder: Oniscidea
- Family: Porcellionidae
- Genus: Porcellio; Latreille, 1804

Diversity
- c. 200 species

Synonyms
- Rogopus Budde-Lund in Voeltzkow, 1908; Poscellio Deshayes, 1842

= Porcellio =

Genus of woodlice

Porcellio is a genus of woodlice in the family Porcellionidae. These crustaceans are found essentially worldwide. A well-known species is the common rough woodlouse, Porcellio scaber.

Most of the hundreds of Porcellio species were described by 1950, and many were known by the end of the 19th century. But occasionally, new species have been found even in the present day.

== Species ==
There are 211 species assigned to the genus:

- Porcellio achilleionensis Verhoeff, 1901
- Porcellio acutiserra Barnard, 1940
- Porcellio aghousi Paulian de Félice, 1939
- Porcellio aguerensis Orihuela-Rivero in Orihuela-Rivero, Balibrea, Noguerales, López & Oromí, 2025
- Porcellio albanicus Verhoeff, 1907
- Porcellio albicornis (Dollfus, 1896)
- Porcellio albinus Budde-Lund, 1885
- Porcellio alexandrinus Brandt, 1833
- Porcellio alluaudi Dollfus, 1893
- Porcellio alpinus Am Stein, 1857
- Porcellio alticola Vandel, 1940
- Porcellio anagae Hoese, 1985
- Porcellio ancararum Rodríguez & Vicente, 1992
- Porcellio andreinii Arcangeli, 1913
- Porcellio angustulus Budde-Lund, 1885
- Porcellio apulicus Arcangeli, 1932
- Porcellio assamensis Chopra, 1924
- Porcellio atlanteus Verhoeff, 1937
- Porcellio atlantidum Paulian de Félice, 1939
- Porcellio atticus Verhoeff, 1907
- Porcellio auritus Budde-Lund, 1885
- Porcellio babilonus Rodriguez & Barrientos, 1993
- Porcellio baeticensis Vandel, 1953
- Porcellio baidensis Viglianisi, Lombardo & Caruso, 1992
- Porcellio balearicus Cruz & Garcia, 1992
- Porcellio barroisi Dollfus, 1892
- Porcellio batesoni Collinge, 1915
- Porcellio beebei Van Name, 1924
- Porcellio blattarius Budde-Lund, 1885
- Porcellio bolivari Dollfus, 1892
- Porcellio bovei Lucas, 1849
- Porcellio brevicaudatus Brandt, 1833
- Porcellio brevipennis Budde-Lund, 1885
- Porcellio buddelundi Simon, 1885
- Porcellio burzenlandicus Verhoeff, 1907
- Porcellio cadenati Vandel, 1954
- Porcellio calderensis Vandel, 1954
- Porcellio canariensis Dollfus, 1893
- Porcellio cataractae Vandel, 1960
- Porcellio cavernicolus Vandel, 1946
- Porcellio centralis Vandel, 1954
- Porcellio chuldahensis Verhoeff, 1923
- Porcellio cibioi Garcia, 2020
- Porcellio cilicius Verhoeff, 1907
- Porcellio colasi Vandel, 1958
- Porcellio conchus S. Mulaik & D. Mulaik, 1943
- Porcellio conifer C. Koch in Rosenhauer, 1856
- Porcellio coronatus C. Koch in Rosenhauer, 1856
- Porcellio cucercus Brandt, 1833
- Porcellio curti (Vandel, 1980)
- Porcellio cytherus Strouhal, 1937
- Porcellio dalensi Caruso & Di Maio, 1990
- Porcellio danieli Garcia, 2023
- Porcellio debueni Dollfus, 1892
- Porcellio deganiensis Verhoeff, 1923
- Porcellio despaxi Vandel, 1958
- Porcellio dilatatus Brandt in Brandt & Ratzeburg, 1831
- Porcellio dispar Verhoeff, 1901
- Porcellio djahizi Medini & Charfi-Cheikhrouha, 2001
- Porcellio djebeli Paulian de Félice, 1939
- Porcellio dominici Di Maio & Caruso, 2006
- Porcellio duboscqui Paulian de Félice, 1941
- Porcellio echinatus Lucas, 1849
- Porcellio elongata Shen, 1949
- Porcellio eserensis Rodríguez & Vicente, 1992
- Porcellio evansi Omer-Cooper, 1923
- Porcellio eximius Dollfus, 1896
- Porcellio expansus Dollfus, 1892
- Porcellio exstinctus Verhoeff, 1923
- Porcellio ferrarai Caruso & Di Maio, 1990
- Porcellio ferroi Paulian de Félice, 1939
- Porcellio ferrugineus Brandt, 1833
- Porcellio festai Arcangeli, 1932
- Porcellio ficulneus Budde-Lund, 1885
- Porcellio flavocinctus Budde-Lund, 1885
- Porcellio flavomarginatus Lucas, 1853
- Porcellio formosus Stuxberg, 1875
- Porcellio franzi Schmölzer, 1955
- Porcellio galapagoensis Van Name, 1924
- Porcellio gallicus Dollfus, 1904
- Porcellio gauthieri Paulian de Félice, 1939
- Porcellio gestroi Brian, 1932
- Porcellio giustii Caruso & Di Maio, 1990
- Porcellio glaberrimus Verhoeff, 1951
- Porcellio graecorum Strouhal, 1955
- Porcellio granarus Nicolet, 1849
- Porcellio grandeus Mulaik & Mulaik, 1943
- Porcellio granuliferus Budde-Lund, 1885
- Porcellio gruneri Hoese, 1978
- Porcellio haasi Arcangeli, 1925
- Porcellio herminiensis Vandel, 1946
- Porcellio hispanus Dollfus, 1892
- Porcellio hoffmannseggii Brandt, 1833
- Porcellio humberti Paulian de Félice, 1939
- Porcellio hyblaeus Viglianisi, Lombardo & Caruso, 1992
- Porcellio hypselos Barnard, 1949
- Porcellio imbutus Budde-Lund, 1885
- Porcellio incanus Budde-Lund, 1885
- Porcellio incavatus Gardini & Taiti, 2023
- Porcellio inconspicuus Dollfus, 1892
- Porcellio ingenuus Budde-Lund, 1885
- Porcellio insignis Brandt, 1833
- Porcellio intercalarius Budde-Lund, 1885
- Porcellio intermedius Schmölzer, 1953
- Porcellio interpolator Budde-Lund, 1885
- Porcellio jaicensis Verhoeff, 1907
- Porcellio jehoensis Uchida, 1935
- Porcellio klaptoczi Verhoeff, 1907
- Porcellio krivosijensis Strouhal, 1939
- Porcellio laevis Latreille, 1804
- Porcellio laevissimus Dollfus, 1898
- Porcellio lamellatus Budde-Lund, 1885
- Porcellio lapidicicolus Paulian de Felice, 1941
- Porcellio lapidicolus Paulian de Félice, 1939
- Porcellio letourneuxi Simon, 1885
- Porcellio liliputanus Nicolet, 1849
- Porcellio longicornis Stein, 1859
- Porcellio maculipennis Budde-Lund, 1895
- Porcellio maculipes Budde-Lund, 1885
- Porcellio magnificus Dollfus, 1892
- Porcellio mahadidi Caruso & Di Maio, 1990
- Porcellio marginalis Budde-Lund, 1885
- Porcellio marginenotatus Budde-Lund, 1885
- Porcellio martini Dalens, 1984
- Porcellio medinae Rodriguez & Barrientos, 1993
- Porcellio mehrdadi Kashani, Ahdiyeh & Zahra, 2017
- Porcellio meridionalis Vandel, 1954
- Porcellio messenicus Verhoeff, 1907
- Porcellio mildei Koch, 1901
- Porcellio monardi Brian, 1953
- Porcellio montanus Budde-Lund, 1885
- Porcellio monticola Lereboullet, 1853
- Porcellio narentanus Verhoeff, 1907
- Porcellio narixae Cifuentes, 2018
- Porcellio nasutus Strouhal, 1936
- Porcellio nemethi Paulian de Félice, 1939
- Porcellio nicklesi Dollfus, 1892
- Porcellio nigrogranulatus Dollfus, 1892
- Porcellio normani (Dollfus in Norman, 1899)
- Porcellio novus Arcangeli, 1936
- Porcellio obsoletus Budde-Lund, 1885
- Porcellio obtusiserra Barnard, 1940
- Porcellio ocellatus Budde-Lund, 1885
- Porcellio olivieri (Audouin, 1826)
- Porcellio ombrionis Vandel, 1954
- Porcellio omodeoi Caruso & Di Maio, 1990
- Porcellio ornatus H. Milne Edwards, 1840
- Porcellio ovalis Dollfus, 1893
- Porcellio ovespertilio Budde-Lund, 1896
- Porcellio palaestinus Verhoeff, 1931
- Porcellio palmae Hoese, 1985
- Porcellio parenzani Arcangeli, 1932
- Porcellio pelopennesius Strouhal, 1937
- Porcellio pelseneeri Arcangeli, 1936
- Porcellio peninsulae Verhoeff, 1944
- Porcellio peyerimhoffi Paulian de Félice, 1942
- Porcellio piceus Dollfus, 1895
- Porcellio pityensis Vandel, 1955
- Porcellio planarius Budde-Lund, 1885
- Porcellio platysoma Brandt, 1841
- Porcellio praeustus Budde-Lund, 1885
- Porcellio provincialis Aubert & Dollfus, 1890
- Porcellio pseudocilicius Schmalfuss, 1992
- Porcellio pseudornatus Taiti & Rossano, 2015
- Porcellio puberulus Dollfus, 1895
- Porcellio pulverulentus Budde-Lund, 1885
- Porcellio pumicatus Budde-Lund, 1885
- Porcellio purpureus Budde-Lund, 1885
- Porcellio pyrenaeus Dollfus, 1892
- Porcellio resacae Mulaik
- Porcellio ribauti Verhoeff, 1907
- Porcellio riffensis Caruso & Di Maio, 1990
- Porcellio romanorum Verhoeff, 1901
- Porcellio rucneri Karaman, 1966
- Porcellio rufobrunneus Omer-Cooper, 1923
- Porcellio saharaiensis Di Maio & Dalens, 1991
- Porcellio scaber Latreille, 1804
- Porcellio scabriusculus Mulaik, 1960
- Porcellio scitus Budde-Lund, 1885
- Porcellio selomai Cifuentes & Barranco, 2020
- Porcellio septentrionalis Vandel, 1954
- Porcellio serratus Tang, Gui & Wu, 1994
- Porcellio siculoccidentalis Viglianisi, Lombardo & Caruso, 1992
- Porcellio silvestrii Arcangeli, 1924
- Porcellio simulator Budde-Lund, 1885
- Porcellio spatulatus Costa, 1882
- Porcellio spinicornis Say, 1818
- Porcellio spinipennis Budde-Lund, 1885
- Porcellio spinipes Dollfus, 1893
- Porcellio strinatii Vandel, 1960
- Porcellio studienstiftius Hoese, 1985
- Porcellio succinctus Budde-Lund, 1885
- Porcellio tentaculatus Vieira, 1982
- Porcellio teodori Arcangeli, 1927
- Porcellio tiberianus Verhoeff, 1923
- Porcellio tinauti Cifuentes, 2019
- Porcellio tirolensis Koch, 1901
- Porcellio tortonesei Arcangeli, 1932
- Porcellio tripolitanus Verhoeff, 1907
- Porcellio turolensis Cruz, 1992
- Porcellio uljanini Budde-Lund, 1885
- Porcellio vandelii Verhoeff, 1938
- Porcellio variabilis Lucas, 1849
- Porcellio veraensis Cifuentes, 2020
- Porcellio villiersi Paulian de Félice, 1939
- Porcellio violaceus Budde-Lund, 1885
- Porcellio wagneri Brandt, 1841
- Porcellio werneri Strouhal, 1929
- Porcellio xavieri Arcangeli, 1958
- Porcellio yemenensis Barnard, 1941
- Porcellio zarcoi Vandel, 1960

Porcellio cyclocephalus and P. notatus are fossil species from Baltic amber. They are placed in the present genus for lack of a better alternative, but whether this is correct is doubtful as the original descriptions are very brief and hardly diagnostic.
