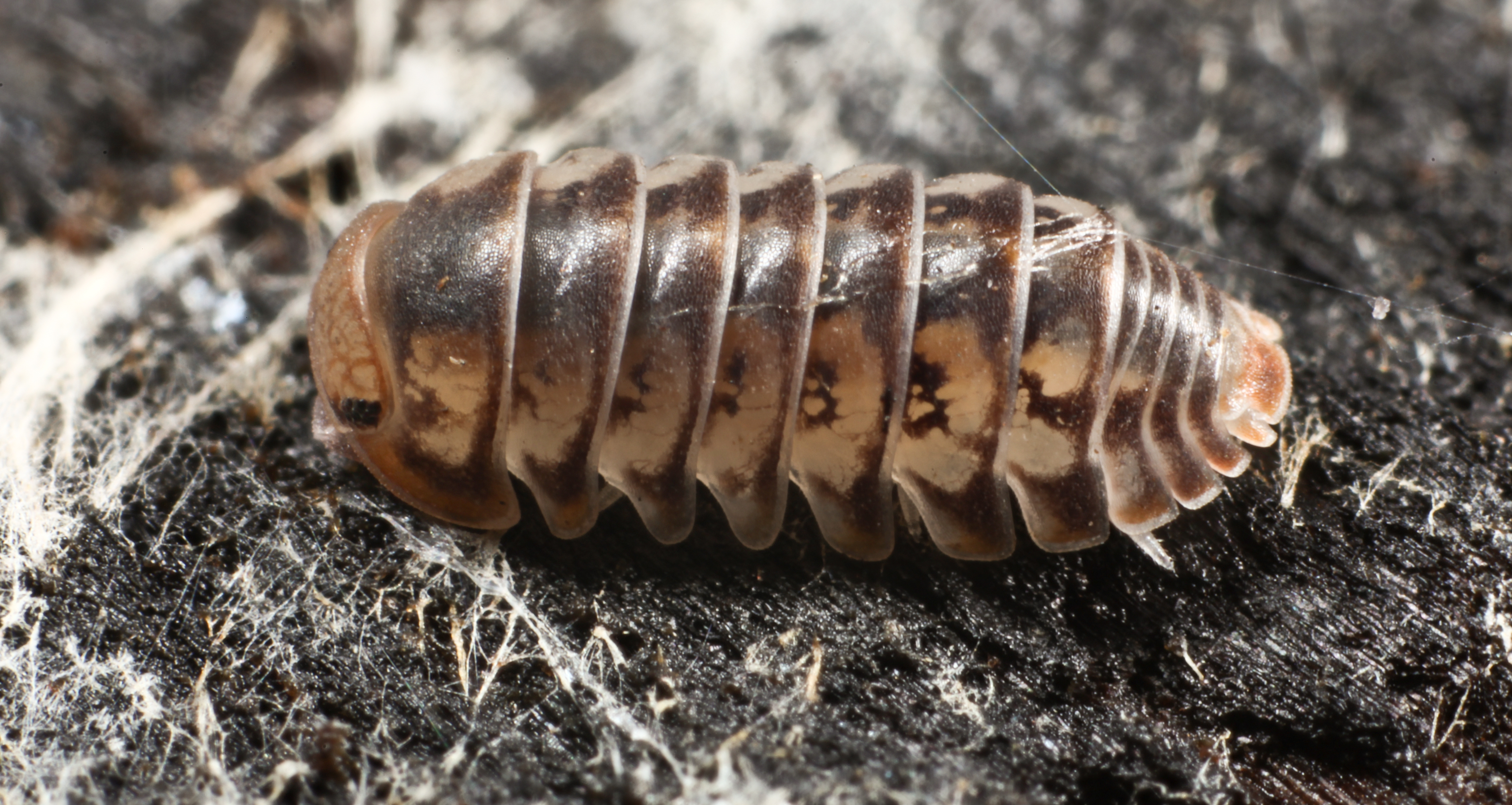
- Venezillo parvus

Scientific classification
- Kingdom: Animalia
- Phylum: Arthropoda
- Clade: Pancrustacea
- Class: Malacostraca
- Order: Isopoda
- Suborder: Oniscidea
- Family: Armadillidae
- Genus: Venezillo; Verhoeff, 1928

Diversity
- at least 140 species

= Venezillo =

Genus of woodlice

Venezillo is a genus of woodlice in the family Armadillidae. The type specimen for this genus was originally described by Gustav Budde-Lund in 1885 as Armadillo clausus and was later redesignated as Venezillo clausus by Karl Wilhelm Verhoeff in 1928. The type specimen was collected in Caracas, Venezuela. There are more than 140 described species in the genus Venezillo.

== Description ==
The genus Venezillo shares many morphological traits with, and is genetically closely related to, the genus Caribodillo. The key physical distinction between the genera is the structure of the first segment (perionite). The ventral lobe of Caribodillo's first pereonite is broad while Venezillo's is narrower and has a well defined cleft.

== Distribution ==
Venezillo has a worldwide distribution with species being found in many countries such as Brazil, Cuba, Mexico, Senegal, United States, and Venezuela.

== See also ==
- List of Venezillo species
