= Gustav Budde-Lund =

Danish zoologist (1846–1911)

- Born: 11 January 1846
- Died: 19 September 1911 (aged 65)
- Scientific career
- Fields: Carcinology, Entomology

Gustav Henrik Andreas Budde-Lund (11 January 1846 – 19 September 1911) was a Danish invertebrate zoologist. In 1868, he co-founded the Entomologisk Forening, alongside Rasmus William Traugott Schlick, Carl August Møller, Andreas Haas and Ivar Frederik Christian Ammitzbøll. He was a student of entomologist J. C. Schiødte, and became a leading authority on terrestrial isopods (woodlice, pill bugs and relatives), describing over 70 genera and around 500 species. He married in 1875 and in 1885 produced his seminal work Crustacea Isopoda terrestria. The woodlouse genus Buddelundiella was named in his honour by Filippo Silvestri in 1897.
