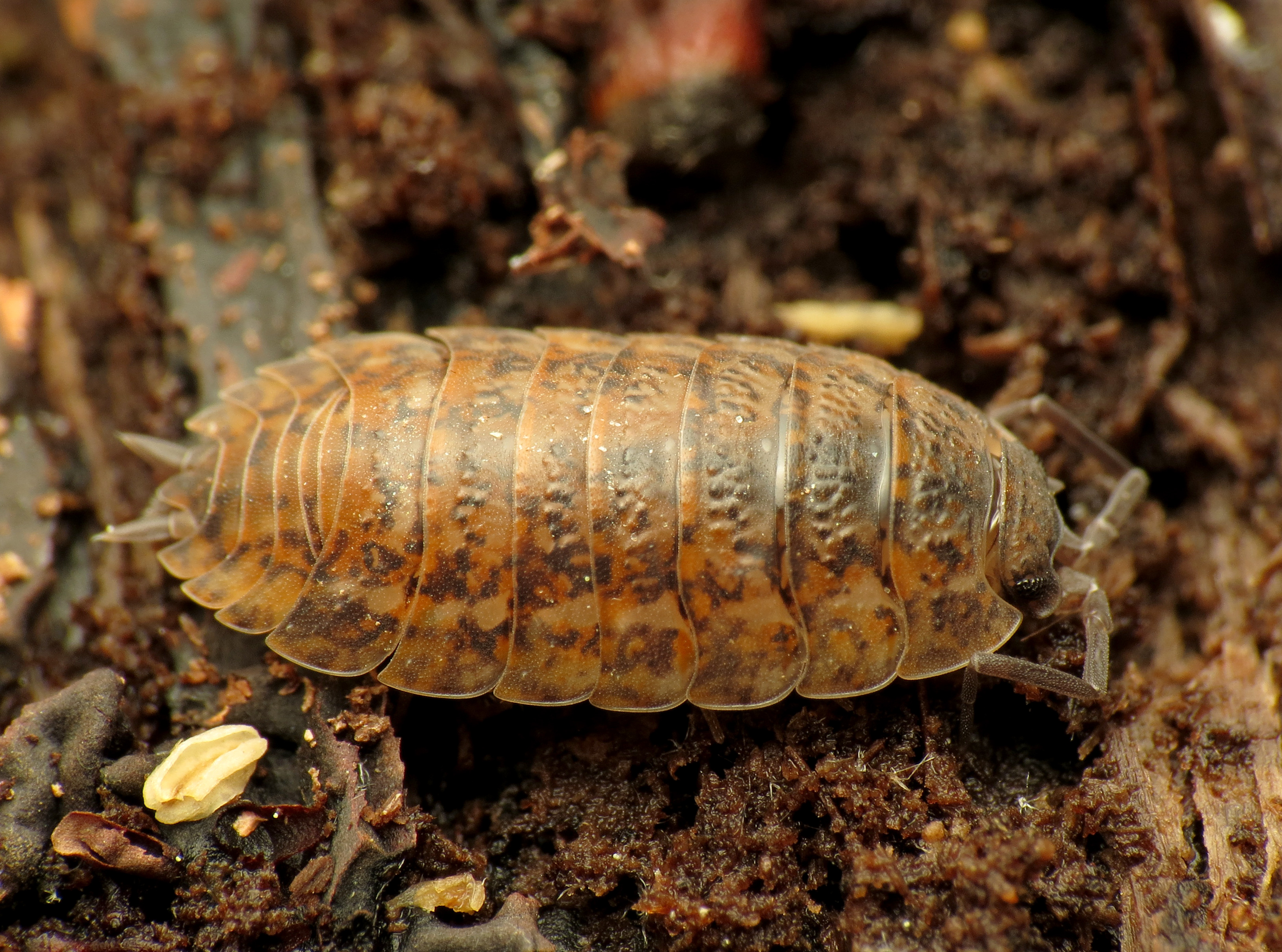
- A female specimen of Trachelipus rathkii photographed in Rock Creek Park, Washington, DC, USA.

Scientific classification
- Kingdom: Animalia
- Phylum: Arthropoda
- Clade: Pancrustacea
- Class: Malacostraca
- Order: Isopoda
- Suborder: Oniscidea
- Section: Crinocheta
- Family: Trachelipodidae; Strouhal, 1953

= Trachelipodidae =

Family of woodlice

Trachelipodidae is a family of woodlice, containing the following genera:

- Levantoniscus Cardoso, Taiti & Sfenthourakis, 2015 (3 species)
- Nagurus Holthuis, 1949 (40 species)
- Pagana Budde-Lund, 1908 (5 species)
- Panchaia Taiti & Ferrara, 2004 (3 species)
- Porcellium Dahl, 1916 (16 species)
- Socotroniscus Ferrara & Taiti, 1996 (monotypic)
- Tamarida Taiti & Ferrara, 2004 (2 species)
- Trachelipus Budde-Lund, 1908 (59 species)
