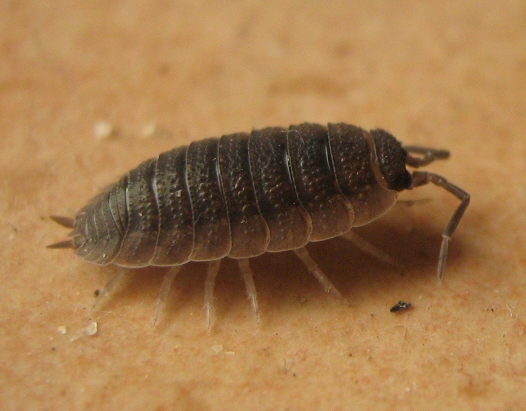
- Porcellio scaber

Scientific classification
- Kingdom: Animalia
- Phylum: Arthropoda
- Clade: Pancrustacea
- Class: Malacostraca
- Order: Isopoda
- Suborder: Oniscidea
- Section: Crinocheta
- Family: Porcellionidae; Brandt & Ratzeburg, 1831

= Porcellionidae =

Family of woodlice

Porcellionidae is a terrestrial family of the order Isopoda.

This family contains 530 species, found on every continent except Antarctica.

== Genera ==
The family contains 19 genera, and two further genera (Inchanga and Mahehia) may be included.

- Acaeroplastes Verhoeff, 1918
- Agabiformius Verhoeff, 1908
- Atlantidium Arcangeli, 1936
- Brevurus Schmalfuss, 1986
- Caeroplastes Verhoeff, 1918
- Congocellio Arcangeli, 1950
- Dorypoditius Verhoeff, 1942
- Leptotrichus Budde-Lund, 1885
- Lucasius Kinahan, 1859
- Mica Budde-Lund, 1908
- Pondo Barnard, 1937
- Porcellio Latreille, 1804
- Porcellionides Miers, 1877
- Proporcellio Verhoeff, 1907
- Soteriscus Vandel, 1956
- Thermocellio Verhoeff, 1942
- Tropicocellio Arcangeli, 1950
- Tura Budde-Lund, 1908
- Uramba Budde-Lund, 1908
