= Rubber duck (disambiguation) =

A rubber duck is a rubber or a plastic duck-shaped bath toy.

Rubber duck may also refer to:

== Devices ==
- Rubber duck (military), a fake rifle used in basic military training
- Rubber duck (engineering vehicle), a wheeled excavator
- Rubber Duck (decoy system), used for anti-ship-missile defense
- Rubber ducky antenna, a short, flexible radio antenna sealed in protective rubber or plastic
- Inflatable boat

== Arts and entertainment ==
- Rubber Duck (album), a 1976 album by C. W. McCall
- "Rubber Duckie", a song by the Sesame Street character Ernie
- "Rubber Ducky", a song by Quincy Jones on the Dollar$ soundtrack
- Rubber Duck, a character in the 1976 novelty single "Convoy" by C. W. McCall and related media
- Rubberduck, a DC Comics character
- Rubber Duck (sculpture), a floating sculpture by Dutch artist Florentijn Hofman
- Akron RubberDucks, a Minor League Baseball team in Akron, Ohio

== Others ==
- Rubber duck debugging, an informal term used in software engineering to refer to a method of debugging code
- Cubaris sp. Rubber Ducky, an isopod

== See also ==
- Duck (disambiguation)
