= C. W. McCall's Greatest Hits =

Greatest hits album by C. W. McCall
- Released: Original: 1983; Re-issued: September 21, 1993
- Genre: Country
- Length: 39:11
- Label: Polydor Records
- Producer: Chip Davis, Don Sears

C. W. McCall chronology
C. W. McCall & Co. (1979)	C. W. McCall's Greatest Hits (1983)	Four Wheel Cowboy (1989)

C. W. McCall's Greatest Hits, as the title suggests, is a greatest hits compilation of country musician C. W. McCall's work, released in 1983 (see 1983 in music) on Polydor Records, rereleased on September 21, 1993, and containing songs from the first five out of his six albums of original music, including the ever-popular "Convoy" and its sequel, "'Round the World with the Rubber Duck".

== Track listing ==
No.	Title	Writer(s)	Length
1.	"Convoy"	Bill Fries, Chip Davis	3:48
2.	"The Silverton"	Fries, Davis	2:56
3.	"Four Wheel Drive"	Fries, Davis	2:58
4.	"Wolf Creek Pass"	Fries, Davis	3:55
5.	"Classified"	Fries, Davis	2:28
6.	"There Won't Be No Country Music (There Won't Be No Rock 'N' Roll)"	Fries, Davis	3:50
7.	"Old Home Filler-up an' Keep on a-Truckin' Café"	Fries, Davis	2:45
8.	"Crispy Critters"	Fries, Davis	2:50
9.	"'Round the World with the Rubber Duck"	Fries, Davis	4:08
10.	"Black Bear Road"	Fries, Davis	2:00
11.	"Roses for Mama"	Johnny Wilson, Gene Dobbins, Wayne Sharpe	3:24
12.	"Aurora Borealis"	Fries, Davis	4:09

== Charts ==
Album - Billboard (North America)

Year	Chart	Position
1983	Country Albums	45
