= Four Wheel Cowboy =

Compilation album by C. W. McCall
- Released: 1989
- Genre: Country
- Length: 27:25
- Label: PolyGram
- Producer: Chip Davis, Don Sears

C. W. McCall chronology
C. W. McCall's Greatest Hits (1983)	Four Wheel Cowboy (1989)	The Real McCall: An American Storyteller (1990)

Four Wheel Cowboy is a greatest hits album by country musician C. W. McCall, released in 1989 (see 1989 in music) on Polydor Records. All of the songs found on it, as well as three more, can be found on a later "best of" album, The Best of C. W. McCall. The release itself takes its name from a McCall song by the same name, which is featured on the album.

Professional ratings
Review scores
Source	Rating
Allmusic	link

== Track listing ==
1. "Convoy" (Bill Fries, Chip Davis) – 3:48
2. "Jackson Hole" (Fries, Davis) – 2:39
3. "Four Wheel Cowboy" (Fries, Davis) – 3:27
4. "Wolf Creek Pass" (Fries, Davis) – 3:55
5. "Old Home Filler-Up an' Keep on a-Truckin' Cafe" (Fries, Davis) – 2:45
6. "The Gallopin' Goose" (Fries, Davis) – 3:20
7. "Audubon" (Fries, Davis) – 3:41
8. "There Won't Be No Country Music (There Won't Be No Rock 'N' Roll)" (Fries, Davis) – 3:50
