= The Real McCall: An American Storyteller =

Studio album by C. W. McCall
- Released: Original: 1990; Re-issued: 1999
- Genre: Country
- Length: 56:31
- Label: American Gramaphone
- Producer: Chip Davis, Don Sears

C. W. McCall chronology
Four Wheel Cowboy (1989)	The Real McCall: An American Storyteller (1990)	The Legendary C. W. McCall (1991)

Professional ratings
Review scores
Source	Rating
Allmusic	3/5 stars

The Real McCall: An American Storyteller is an album by country musician C. W. McCall, released on American Gramaphone in 1990 (see 1990 in music) and rereleased in 1999 (see 1999 in music). It features revamped digital versions of some of McCall's better known songs, including "Convoy", "Wolf Creek Pass" and "Black Bear Road", rerecorded by the artist for the album. It contains more songs than any other release by the artist, with sixteen tracks in total. It features songs from most of McCall's albums, the exceptions being his later works, C. W. McCall & Co. and Roses for Mama. One new track, "Comin' Back for More", telling the story of the infamous American cannibal Alferd Packer, was recorded for the album and serves as its opener. Songwriting on the album is credited to lyricist Bill Fries (the real name of C. W. McCall) and composer Chip Davis, who together have created nearly all original songs by McCall throughout the history of the character.

== Track listing ==
1. "Comin' Back for More" (Bill Fries, Chip Davis) – 3:51
2. "Ghost Town" (Fries, Davis) – 3:59
3. "Glenwood Canyon" (Fries, Davis) – 3:26
4. "There Won't Be No Country Music" (Fries, Davis) – 3:50
5. "Roy" (Fries, Davis) – 0:40
6. "The Little Brown Sparrow" (Fries, Davis) – 4:34
7. "Wilderness" (Fries, Davis) – 3:19
8. "Aurora Borealis" (Fries, Davis) – 4:11
9. "The Silverton" (Fries, Davis) – 3:51
10. "Wolf Creek Pass" (Fries, Davis) – 3:58
11. "Night Rider" (Fries, Davis) – 2:34
12. "Rocky Mountain September" (Fries, Davis) – 3:39
13. "Black Bear Road" (Fries, Davis) – 2:08
14. "Camp Bird Mine" (Fries, Davis) – 3:33
15. "Convoy" (Fries, Davis) – 3:50
16. "Columbine" (Fries, Davis) – 5:08

== Personnel ==
- C. W. McCall – Vocals, Jacket Concept
- Liz Westphalen, Pam Kalal, Denise Fackler, LynnDee Mueller, Jackson Berkey, Doug Fackler, Jim Kalal – Background Vocals
- Chip Davis – Background Vocals, Drums, Percussion, Keyboards, Producer, Jacket Concept
- Jackson Berkey – Keyboards
- Eric Hansen – Bass, Trumpet
- Steve Hanson – Banjo
- Ron Cooley – Guitars
- Willis Ann Ross – Flute
- Bob Jenkins – Oboe
- Mary Walter – Harp
- Wayne Jesz – Percussion, Engineering Assistant, Mastering
- Arnie Roth – Concert Master
- Ruben Gonzalez, Samuel Magad, Everett Mirsky, Peter Labella, Edgar Muenzer, Thomas Yang, Florentina Ramniceanu, Joseph Golan, Helen Nightengale, Steve Shipps, Clara Lindner, Thomas Hall, Gail Salvatori, Ronald Satkiewicz – Violin
- Oatakar Sroubek, Danial Strba, Robert Swan, John Bartholomew, Roger Moulton, Martin Abrams, Marlou Johnston – Viola
- Barbara Haffner, Lenny Chausow, Phillip Blum, Judith Stone, Felix Wurman, Mark Lekas – Cello
- Dale Clevenger, Alice Render Clevenger, Richard Oldberg, David Kappy – French Horn
- Joseph Guastafeste, Collins Trier, Virginia Dixon, Gregory Sarchet – Bass
- George Vosburgh – Trumpet
- Ed Kocher, Arthur Linsner, Charlie Vernon – Trombone
- Dale Hoaglan – Locomotive Whistle

=== Additional personnel ===
- John Boyd – Recording, Mixing
- Bill Bradley – Strings and Bass Engineering
- Arnie Roth – Orchestral Conducting
- Brian Ackley, John Armstrong – Engineering Assistants
- Louis J. Stout, Jr. – Orcherstral Assistant
- Louis F. Davis, Sr. – Keyboard Technician
- Hirsch Design – Art Production
