= Roses for Mama =

Roses for Mama may refer to:

- Roses for Mama (album), a 1977 album by C.W. McCall
- "Roses for Mama" (song), the title track and Top 5 country hit by McCall
- Roses for Mama, a 1990 novel by Janette Oke
