= The Legendary C. W. McCall =

Compilation album by C. W. McCall
- Released: 1991
- Genre: Country
- Length: 38:19
- Label: PolyGram
- Producer: Chip Davis, Don Sears

C. W. McCall chronology
The Real McCall: An American Storyteller (1990)	The Legendary C. W. McCall (1991)	The Best of C. W. McCall (1997)

The Legendary C. W. McCall is a greatest hits album released on audio cassette only by country musician C. W. McCall in 1991 (see 1991 in music), on the PolyGram label. It does not contain any songs that cannot be found on the most well-known "best of" releases from McCall, The Best of C. W. McCall and C. W. McCall's Greatest Hits. Several errors were made in the track listing; for instance, "Black Bear Road" was listed as "Black Beer Road", while "Crispy Critters" was given the title "Crispy Critter".

== Track listing ==
1. "Convoy" (Bill Fries, Chip Davis) - 3:48
2. "Wolf Creek Pass" (Fries, Davis) - 3:55
3. "Old Home Filler-Up an' Keep on a-Truckin' Cafe" (Fries, Davis) - 2:45
4. "There Won't Be No Country Music (There Won't Be No Rock 'N' Roll)" (Fries, Davis) - 3:50
5. "Black Bear Road" (Fries, Davis) - 2:00
6. "Round the World with the Rubber Duck" (Fries, Davis) - 4:08
7. "Four Wheel Cowboy" (Fries, Davis) - 3:27
8. "Outlaws and Lone Star Beer" (Bob Duncan, John Durril) - 1:56
9. "Crispy Critter" (Fries, Davis) - 2:50
10. "Audubon" (Fries, Davis) - 3:41
11. "The Gallopin' Goose" (Fries, Davis) - 3:20
12. "Jackson Hole" (Fries, Davis) - 2:39
