= List of Cubaris species =

This is a list of 104 species in Cubaris, a genus of woodlice in the family Armadillidae.

== Cubaris species ==
- Cubaris acapulcensis (Mulaik, 1960)^{i c g}
- Cubaris africana (Taiti & Ferrara, 1987)^{i c g}
- Cubaris albolateralis (Collinge, 1916)^{i c g}
- Cubaris alticola (Vandel, 1973)^{i c g}
- Cubaris ambitiosa (Budde-Lund, 1885)^{i c g}
- Cubaris arcangelii (Verhoeff)^{i g}
- Cubaris barbertoni (Barnard, 1932)^{i g}
- Cubaris benitensis (Mulaik, 1960)^{i c g}
- Cubaris bocki (Verhoeff, 1938)^{i}
- Cubaris bolivari (Mulaik, 1960)^{i c g}
- Cubaris boliviana (Dollfus, 1897)^{i}
- Cubaris brunneocaudata (Collinge, 1916)^{i c g}
- Cubaris caerulea (Collinge, 1914)^{i c}
- Cubaris californica (Budde-Lund, 1885)^{i}
- Cubaris canalensis (Verhoeff, 1926)^{i}
- Cubaris cavernosa (Collinge, 1916)^{i c g}
- Cubaris chiltoni (Collinge, 1916)^{i c g}
- Cubaris cinchonae (Van Name, 1936)^{i c g}
- Cubaris cinerea (Brandt, 1833)^{c}
- Cubaris claytonensis (Chilton, 1917)^{i c g}
- Cubaris commensalis (Baker, 1913)^{i}
- Cubaris crenata (Lewis, 1998)^{c g}
- Cubaris crenatus (Lewis, 1998)^{i}
- Cubaris decoui (Vandel, 1973)^{c g}
- Cubaris dhaliwali (Lillemets & Wilson, 2002)^{c g}
- Cubaris dilectum (Collinge, 1916)^{i c g}
- Cubaris emunita (Budde-Lund, 1904)^{i c g}
- Cubaris everesti (Vandel, 1973)^{i c g}
- Cubaris expansa (Collinge, 1916)^{c g}
- Cubaris expansus (Collinge, 1916)^{i}
- Cubaris fasciata (Lewis, 1998)^{c g}
- Cubaris fasciatus (Lewis, 1998)^{i}
- Cubaris ferruginea (Lewis, 1998)^{c g}
- Cubaris ferrugineus (Lewis, 1998)^{i}
- Cubaris flavobrunnea (Dollfus, 1896)^{i c g}
- Cubaris fragilis (Collinge, 1914)^{i}
- Cubaris fritschei (Verhoeff, 1938)^{i}
- Cubaris galbineus (Eschscholtz, 1823)^{i}
- Cubaris goweri (Lewis, 1998)^{i c g}
- Cubaris granaria (Nicolet, 1849)^{i c g}
- Cubaris granulata (Collinge, 1915)^{c g}
- Cubaris granulatus (Collinge, 1915)^{i}
- Cubaris gravelii (Collinge, 1916)^{i c g}
- Cubaris griseus (Collinge, 1920)^{i}
- Cubaris harsadiensis (Barnard, 1940)^{i}
- Cubaris helmsiana (Chilton, 1917)^{i}
- Cubaris hickmani (Green, 1961)^{i c g}
- Cubaris hirsuta (Lewis, 1998)^{c g}
- Cubaris hirsutus (Lewis, 1998)^{i}
- Cubaris howensis (Poore, 2002)^{c g}
- Cubaris ignota (Arcangeli, 1934)^{i c g}
- Cubaris incisus (Verhoeff, 1926)^{i}
- Cubaris insularis (Searle, 1922)^{i c g}
- Cubaris invenustus (Collinge, 1915)^{i}
- Cubaris javanensis (Dollfus, 1889)^{i}
- Cubaris joliveti (Vandel, 1972)^{c g}
- Cubaris kashmiri (Jackson, 1935)^{i c g}
- Cubaris lacustris (Verhoeff, 1926)^{i}
- Cubaris lewisae (Lillemets & Wilson, 2002)^{c g}
- Cubaris lifuensis (Stebbing, 1900)^{i c g}
- Cubaris lobata (Collinge, 1916)^{c g}
- Cubaris lobatus (Collinge, 1916)^{i}
- Cubaris longicornis (Verhoeff, 1926)^{i}
- Cubaris lundi (Stebbing, 1900)^{i}
- Cubaris maculata (Schmalfuss & Ferrara, 1983)^{i c g}
- Cubaris margaritae (Vandel, 1952)^{i c g}
- Cubaris marmorata (Wahrberg, 1922)^{i c g}
- Cubaris marmoratus (Collinge, 1916)^{i}
- Cubaris meermohri (Arcangeli, 1935)^{i c g}
- Cubaris merulanoides (Wahrberg, 1922)^{i c g}
- Cubaris minilobus (Lewis, 1998)^{i c g}
- Cubaris minima (Vandel, 1977)^{i c g}
- Cubaris minuta (Mulaik, 1960)^{i c g}
- Cubaris mirandai (Rioja, 1954)^{i c g}
- Cubaris miser (Budde-Lund, 1904)^{i}
- Cubaris misera (Budde-Lund, 1904)^{c g}
- Cubaris murina (Brandt, 1833)^{i c g} (little sea pillbug)
- Cubaris nacreum (Collinge, 1915)^{i g}
- Cubaris nacrum (Collinge, 1915)^{c g}
- Cubaris nepalensis (Vandel, 1973)^{i c g}
- Cubaris nigroflava (Wahrberg, 1922)^{i c g}
- Cubaris obliquidens (Barnard, 1932)^{i}
- Cubaris oxyzomus (Barnard, 1940)^{i}
- Cubaris pacificum (Borradaile, 1900)^{i}
- Cubaris pacificus (Verhoeff, 1926)^{i}
- Cubaris plasticus (Verhoeff, 1926)^{i}
- Cubaris pongolae (Barnard, 1937)^{i}
- Cubaris pronyensis (Verhoeff, 1926)^{i}
- Cubaris pusilla (Collinge, 1916)^{c g}
- Cubaris pusillus (Collinge, 1916)^{i}
- Cubaris robusta (Collinge, 1914)^{i c g}
- Cubaris rufonigra (Wahrberg, 1922)^{i c g}
- Cubaris sarasini (Verhoeff, 1926)^{i}
- Cubaris schellenbergi (Verhoeff, 1928)^{i}
- Cubaris solidula (Collinge, 1915)^{c g}
- Cubaris solidulus (Collinge, 1915)^{i}
- Cubaris spenceri (Barnes, 1934)^{i}
- Cubaris sulcifrons (Green, 1961)^{i c g}
- Cubaris suteri (Chilton, 1915)^{i}
- Cubaris tamarensis (Green, 1961)^{i c g}
- Cubaris tarangensa (Budde-Lund, 1904)^{i g}
- Cubaris tarangensis (Budde-Lund, 1904)^{c g}
- Cubaris tasmaniensis (Green, 1961)^{i c g}
- Cubaris truncata (Collinge, 1920)^{i}

Data sources: i = ITIS, c = Catalogue of Life, g = GBIF,
