= U.S. Route 160 =

Highway in the United States

U.S. Route 160
- US 160 highlighted in red

Route information
- Auxiliary route of US 60
- Length: 1,465 mi (2,358 km)
- Existed: 1930–present

Major junctions
- West end: US 89 near Tuba City, AZ
- US 191 in Mexican Water, AZ; US 64 in Teec Nos Pos, AZ; US 84 in Pagosa Springs, CO; US 285 in Alamosa, CO; I-25 / US 85 / US 87 between Walsenburg and Trinidad, CO; I-35 / Kansas Turnpike at Wellington, KS; I-49 / US 71 at Lamar, MO; I-44 at Springfield, MO; US 60 in Springfield, MO; US 65 near Branson, MO
- East end: Future I-57 / US 67 / Route 158 near Poplar Bluff, MO

Location
- Country: United States
- States: Arizona, New Mexico, Colorado, Kansas, Missouri

Highway system
- United States Numbered Highway System; List; Special; Divided

U.S. Route 160 (US 160) is a 1,465-mile-long (2,358 km) east–west United States Numbered Highway in the Midwestern and Western United States. The western terminus of the route is at US 89 five miles (8.0 km) west of Tuba City, Arizona. The eastern terminus is at US 67 and Missouri 158 southwest of Poplar Bluff, Missouri. Its route, if not its number, was made famous in song in 1975, as the road from Wolf Creek Pass to Pagosa Springs, Colorado in C.W. McCall's country music song "Wolf Creek Pass".

== Route description ==
=== Arizona ===
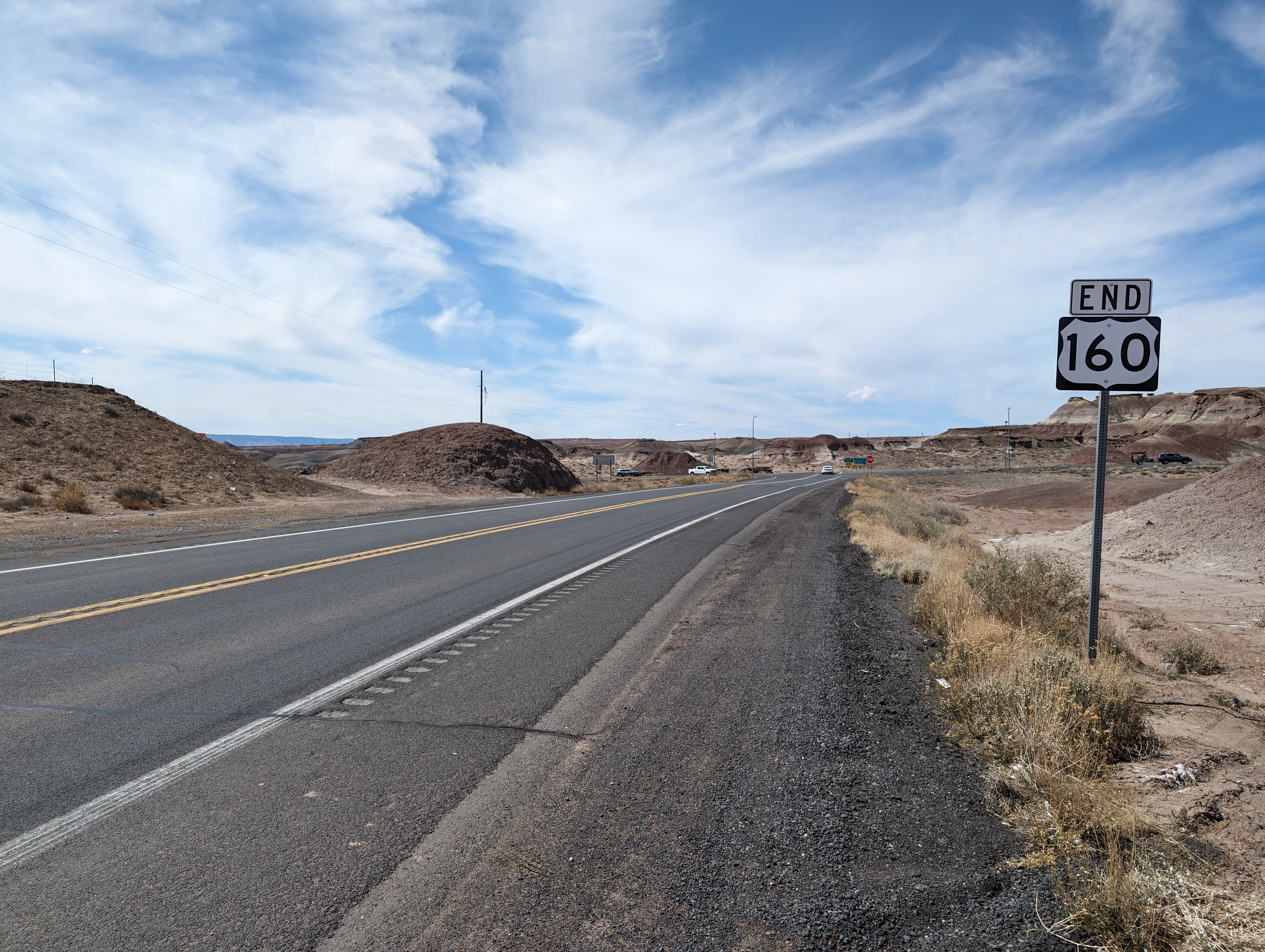
Western terminus of US 160 at US 89 near Tuba City, AZ

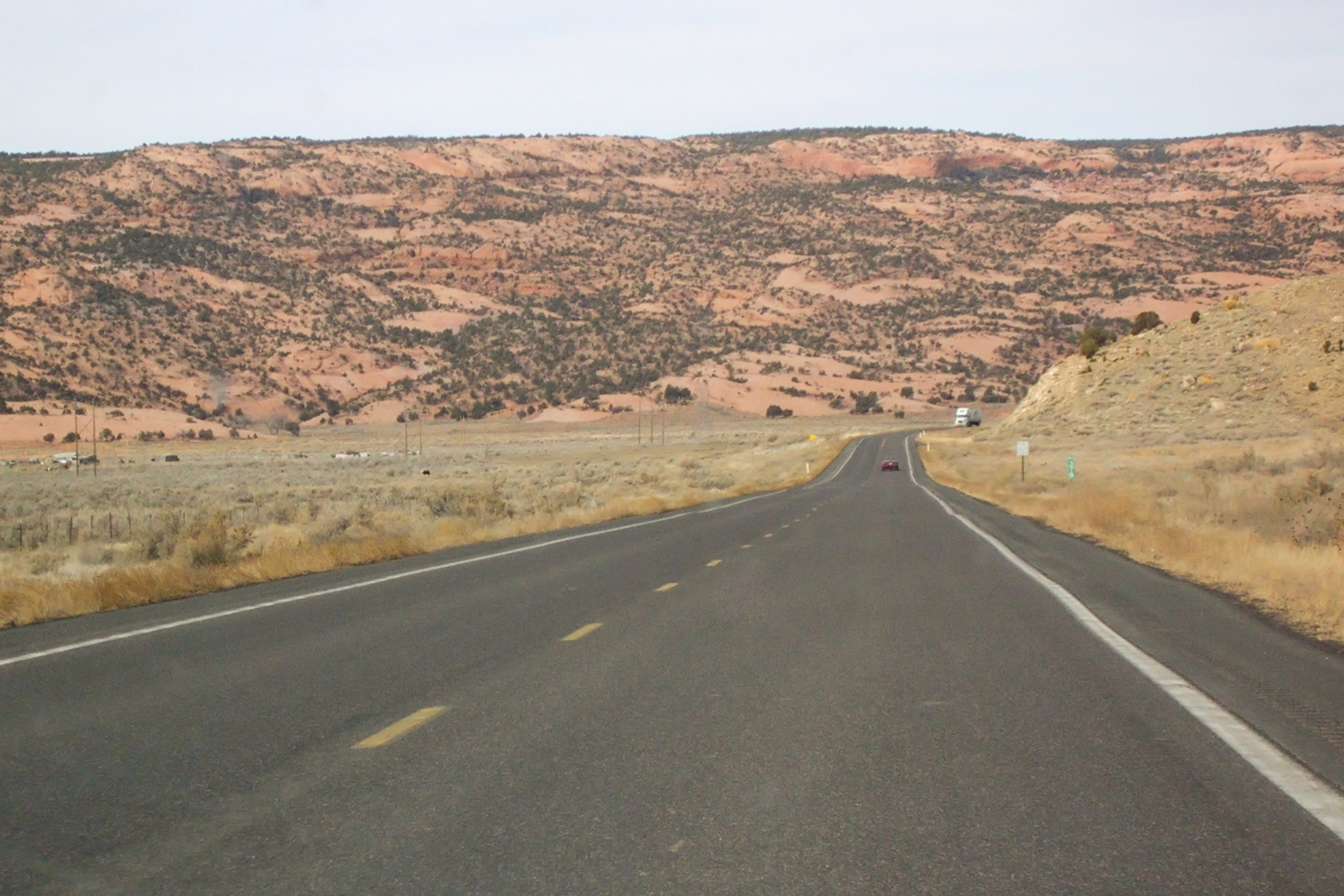
U.S. Route 160 in Arizona

US 160 begins at US 89 near the western edge of Navajo Nation. Near Tuba City, it intersects State Route 264. It goes through Tonalea and Cow Springs before entering Kayenta, where it intersects U.S. Route 163. It continues northeast through Dennehotso, then has a brief overlap with U.S. Route 191 in Mexican Water. It goes east until Teec Nos Pos, where it intersects U.S. Route 64, then turns northeast to go to the Four Corners and enters New Mexico.

US 160 is one of the major routes crossing the Navajo Nation and in Arizona does not leave the Navajo Nation.

=== New Mexico ===
About 0.9 miles (1.4 km) of US 160 is located within New Mexico. The highway travels northeast through extreme northwestern New Mexico, intersecting State Road 597, which provides access to the Four Corners Monument. US-160 along with NM-597 do not connect to any other portion of the New Mexico state highway network, requiring New Mexico Department of Transportation crews to travel through either Arizona or Colorado to access it.

=== Colorado ===
U.S. Route 160 enters Colorado near the Four Corners Monument. It goes northeast and intersects U.S. Route 491, then turns north to enter Cortez with U.S. 491. East of Cortez, a road leads south from U.S. 160 to Mesa Verde National Park. It continues east to Durango, where it intersects U.S. Route 550. After overlapping with U.S. 550 south of Durango, U.S. 160 turns east and meets U.S. Route 84 at Pagosa Springs. It then goes northeast and crosses the Continental Divide at Wolf Creek Pass.

From Wolf Creek Pass, U.S. 160 continues northeast and turns east at South Fork. At Monte Vista, an overlap begins with U.S. Route 285, which continues southeast into Alamosa. It turns east, then goes northeast to go through North La Veta Pass, then continues east to Walsenburg, where it intersects Interstate 25.

From Walsenburg, U.S. 160 continues south with Interstate 25 to Trinidad, then turns northeast to intersect U.S. Route 350. It continues east, passing through the Comanche National Grassland before intersecting the concurrent U.S. Route 287 and U.S. Route 385 south of Springfield. It continues east and enters Kansas east of Walsh.

The Wolf Creek Pass is famous in the 1975 C.W. McCall's country song of the same name.

=== Kansas ===
US-160 enters Kansas just west of Saunders. It goes northeast to Johnson City, then turns east to go through Ulysses. Near Sublette, it intersects U.S. Route 83 and runs concurrently southward past its intersection with U.S. Route 56. It turns east and then runs concurrently with U.S. Route 54 between Plains and Meade. It continues east, and runs concurrently with U.S. Route 283 and U.S. Route 183. At Medicine Lodge, it intersects U.S. Route 281. It continues east and at Wellington, intersects U.S. Route 81 and then Interstate 35, on which the Kansas Turnpike is routed in the area.

East of Interstate 35, it intersects U.S. Route 77 in Winfield. It goes east from Winfield, then turns north to Burden, then goes east before going south to Elk City. It then turns east and goes through Independence after being concurrent with U.S. Route 75. It continues east, is briefly concurrent with U.S. Route 169 and then intersects U.S. Route 59 at Altamont. US-160 and US-59 then go into Oswego and separate. At Columbus, US-160 begins a concurrency with U.S. Route 69, which goes east to Crestline, then north to Frontenac, Kansas. Also at Crestline, it picks up a second concurrency with U.S. Route 400, which goes north and ends just south of Pittsburg, Kansas. After Frontenac, it turns east and enters Missouri.

=== Missouri ===
U.S. Route 160 enters Missouri west of Mindenmines. At Lamar, it intersects Interstate 49/U.S. Route 71. It goes southeast going through Greenfield and Willard before passing through Springfield, where it intersects Interstate 44 and U.S. Route 60, with which it has a short concurrency with the latter. It goes south out of Springfield into Nixa as Massey Boulevard, then turns east and intersects U.S. Route 65 north of Branson. It continues east to West Plains, where it intersects U.S. Route 63, then ends southwest of Poplar Bluff at an intersection with U.S. Route 67 (Future Interstate 57).

In Willard, US 160 runs on a bypass along the western and southern edge of town. The old alignment through Willard is now U.S. Route 160 Business.

== History ==
=== Western terminus ===
As commissioned in 1930 the western terminus was Trinidad, Colorado. In 1939, US 160 absorbed all of former route U.S. Route 450 which ran from U.S. 50 at Crescent Junction, Utah to U.S. Route 85 at Walsenburg, Colorado.

U.S. Route 450
- Location: Crescent Junction, UT–Walsenburg, CO
- Existed: 1926–1939

In 1970 many US highways in the Four Corners region were re-aligned. U.S. 160 was diverted southwesterly from Cortez, Colorado to follow its present route past the Four Corners into Arizona, absorbing the route numbered U.S. Route 164 from 1964-1970.

The portion of former US 160 (and US 450) from Crescent Jct. to Monticello, Utah was replaced with U.S. Route 163 (now U.S. Route 191) and the portion from Monticello to Cortez, Colorado was replaced with U.S. Route 666 (now U.S. Route 491).

=== Eastern terminus ===
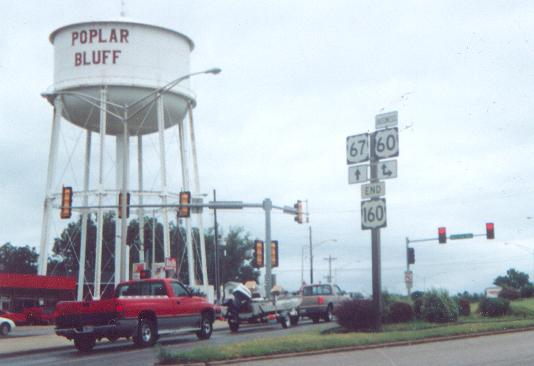
Former eastern terminus of US 160 in Poplar Bluff, Missouri.

The eastern terminus of US 160 was originally located at an intersection with U.S. Route 60 and then-U.S. Route 66 in Springfield, Missouri (Grant Avenue and College Street). In the 1950s, the terminus moved eastward across the state to an intersection with then-US 60 and then-U.S. Route 67 (now US 60 Bus. and U.S. Route 67 Business) in Poplar Bluff. The extension between Springfield and Poplar Bluff was parallel to U.S. Route 65 from Springfield to Highlandville. Between Highlandville and Holister, the highways ran concurrently. Past Holister, US 160 headed east across the Ozark Mountains. Route 160 was later routed further north in the Branson area, replacing a section of Route 148. In 2007, the terminus was moved to its current location southwest of Poplar Bluff, eliminating a concurrency between US 160 and two other highways (US 67 and US 67 Business) over the last 10 miles (16 km) of US 160.

=== Missouri ===
When U.S. Route 160 was formed in Missouri in 1930, it replaced Route 12, which had been created in 1922 as Route 36 from Kansas to Springfield and renumbered in 1926 due to US 36. The 1950s extension absorbed Route 80 (Gainesville to West Plains in 1922, later extended west to Lakeview and east to Thomasville) and the part of Route 14 east of Alton (created in 1922 as Route 42, and later absorbed by Route 14).

== Major intersections ==
Arizona
US 89 southwest of Tuba City
US 163 in Kayenta
US 191 south-southeast of Mexican Water. The highways travel concurrently to southeast of Mexican Water.
US 64 in Teec Nos Pos
New Mexico
No major intersections
Colorado
US 491 south of Towaoc. The highways travel concurrently to Cortez.
US 550 in Durango. The highways travel concurrently to south-southeast of Durango.
US 84 in Pagosa Springs
US 285 in Monte Vista. The highways travel concurrently to Alamosa.
I-25 / US 85 / US 87 in Walsenburg. The highways travel concurrently to Trinidad.
US 350 east-northeast of El Moro
US 287 / US 385 south of Springfield
Kansas
US 83 north-northwest of Sublette. The highways travel concurrently to northwest of Kismet.
US 54 east of Plains. The highways travel concurrently to east of Meade.
US 283 south-southeast of Minneola. The highways travel concurrently to north of Englewood.
US 183 north-northwest of Sitka. The highways travel concurrently to north of Coldwater.
US 281 west-southwest of Medicine Lodge. The highways travel concurrently to Medicine Lodge.
US 81 in Wellington. The highways travel concurrently through Wellington.
I-35 east of Wellington
US 77 in Winfield
US 75 west of Independence. The highways travel concurrently to Independence.
US 169 south-southwest of Cherryvale. The highways travel concurrently for approximately 0.9 miles (1.4 km).
US 59 east of Altamont. The highways travel concurrently to Oswego.
US 69 northeast of Columbus. The highways travel concurrently to Frontenac.
US 400 north of Crestline. The highways travel concurrently to south of Pittsburg.
Missouri
I-49 / US 71 in Lamar
I-44 in Springfield
US 60 in Springfield. The highways travel concurrently through Springfield.
US 65 northwest of Walnut Shade
US 63 in West Plains. The highways travel concurrently through West Plains.
Future I-57 / US 67 east-northeast of Fairdealing

== Special routes ==
There are currently three business routes of US 160.

=== Mancos ===
U.S. Highway 160 Business
- Location: Mancos, Colorado

U.S. 160 Business is a business loop that serves Mancos located in southwestern Colorado. It begins west of Mancos and goes straight through downtown. It parallels the Mancos River as it leaves town before it terminates at US 160.

Major intersections
The entire route is in Mancos, Montezuma County.

mi	km	Destinations	Notes
0.000	0.000	US 160	Western terminus
1.522	2.449	SH 184 north	Southern terminus of SH 184
2.488	4.004	US 160	Eastern terminus
1.000 mi = 1.609 km; 1.000 km = 0.621 mi

=== Bayfield ===
U.S. Highway 160 Business
- Location: Bayfield, Colorado

U.S. Route 160 Business is a business loop that serves Bayfield located in southwestern Colorado. The entire route runs along Bayfield parkway which begins at US 160 west of Bayfield. It crosses the Los Pinos River and runs north of downtown until it reaches its eastern terminus at US 160.

=== Willard ===
U.S. Highway 160 Business
- Location: Willard, Missouri

U.S. Route 160 Business is a business loop that serves Willard in southwestern Missouri. It runs along Jackson Street from US 160 northwest of Willard and through downtown before it terminates at US 160 southeast of town. It is also a former alignment of US 160 as it was rerouted on a bypass around Willard.

== See also ==
=== Related routes ===
- U.S. Route 60
- U.S. Route 260
- U.S. Route 360
- U.S. Route 460

Browse numbered routes
← US 159	MO	→ Route 161
