= Gary Graff =

American music journalist and author (born 1960)

- Graff in 2019
- Born: 1960 (age 65–66)
- Occupations: Music journalist, author
- Writing career
- Subject: Rock music

Gary Graff (born 1960) is an American music journalist and author.

== Biography ==
Originally from Pittsburgh, Pennsylvania, Graff attended Taylor Allderdice High School where he wrote for school newspaper The Taylor Allderdice Foreword. He received his Bachelor of Journalism degree from the University of Missouri. He wrote for the Detroit Free Press from 1982 until 1995 when there was a strike at the newspaper. Graff refused to cross the picket line and subsequently lost his job. Graff has contributed to publications including The New York Times, Billboard, The Boston Globe, The Cleveland Plain Dealer, and San Francisco Chronicle, as well as writing a regular columns for Guitar World magazine, Ultimate Classic Rock and Consequence.

In 2005, Graff published The Ties That Bind: Bruce Springsteen A to E to Z. One reviewer said that the book "comes close to being the definitive study" on Bruce Springsteen. He is also the founding editor of MusicHound's "Essential Album Guide" series, which began with MusicHound Rock in 1996. Graff is also a frequent contributor to The Drew and Mike Podcast and the Bob & Brian radio show on WHQG in Milwaukee, Wisconsin. He now lives in Detroit, Michigan.

== Bibliography ==
- 1996 (rev. 1999): MusicHound Rock: The Essential Album Guide (Visible Ink Press)
- 2005: The Ties That Bind: Bruce Springsteen A to E to Z (Visible Ink Press)
- 2010: Travelin' Man: On the Road and Behind the Scenes with Bob Seger (Painted Turtle)
- 2023: Alice Cooper at 75 (Motorbooks)
- 2024: 501 Essential Albums of the '90s: The Music Fan's Definitive Guide (Motorbooks)
