= The Best of C. W. McCall =

Greatest hits album by C. W. McCall
- Released: 1997
- Genre: Country
- Length: 34:49
- Label: PSM
- Producer: Chip Davis, Don Sears

C. W. McCall chronology
The Legendary C. W. McCall (1991)	The Best of C. W. McCall (1997)	American Spirit (2003)

Professional ratings
Review scores
Source	Rating
Allmusic	link

The Best of C. W. McCall is a greatest hits album released by country musician C. W. McCall on the PSM label in 1997 (see 1997 in music). As with all "best of" releases from McCall, the album contains the wildly popular song "Convoy", as well as eleven others. The cover is almost identical to that of McCall's second album, Black Bear Road.

== Track listing ==
1. "Convoy" (Bill Fries, Chip Davis) – 3:48
2. "Jackson Hole" (Fries, Davis) – 2:39
3. "Four Wheel Cowboy" (Fries, Davis) – 3:27
4. "Wolf Creek Pass" (Fries, Davis) – 3:57
5. "Old Home Filler-Up an' Keep on a-Truckin' Cafe" (Fries, Davis) – 2:53
6. "The Gallopin' Goose" (Fries, Davis) – 3:20
7. "Audubon" (Fries, Davis) – 3:41
8. "There Won't Be No Country Music (There Won't Be No Rock 'N' Roll)" (Fries, Davis) – 3:44
9. "Long Lonesome Road" (Fries, Davis) – 2:10
10. "Green River" (Fries, Davis) – 3:10
11. "Black Bear Road" (Fries, Davis) – 2:00
