= Black Bear Road =

Road in Colorado

Black Bear Pass
- Interactive map of Black Bear Pass
- Elevation: 12,840 feet (3,910 m)
- Traversed by: Unpaved road

Third Approach
- Location: San Juan / San Miguel counties, Colorado, U.S.
- Range: Rocky Mountains
- Coordinates: 37°53.9717′N 107°44.5783′W

Black Bear Road or Black Bear Pass, and officially Forest Service Road 648, is a dirt road that starts from the 11,018-foot (3,358 m) summit of Red Mountain Pass on U.S. Highway 550 (between Ouray and Silverton) to Telluride, Colorado. The road crests at Black Bear Pass, elevation 12,840 feet (3,910 m), and descends over a set of switchbacks as it navigates the heights above Telluride. The road passes Bridal Veil Falls, the highest waterfall in Colorado. In 1975, the road was the subject of a spoken-word song and album of the same title by country musician C. W. McCall.

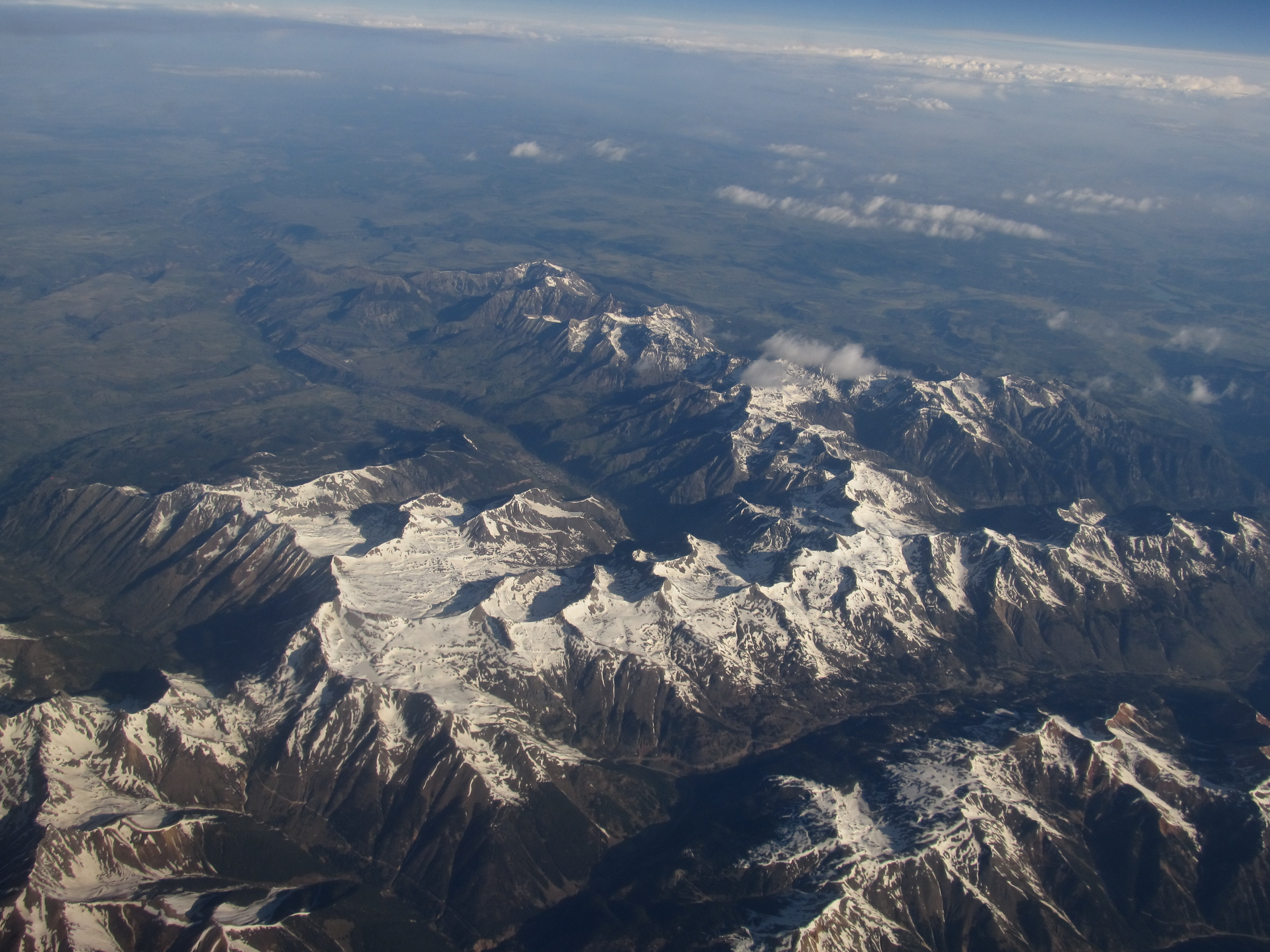
In this aerial photo facing west, Telluride is at center, surrounded by mountains on three sides. Black Bear Road traverses the mountains from US-550, visible as a line in the valley at bottom.

Black Bear Road is open a few months of the year, from late summer (usually the last week of July) to early fall. The road is traveled only downhill from Red Mountain Pass — except for the annual Jeeper's Jamboree in which travel is reversed for one day only. The start of the trail was formerly marked along U.S. 550 with a sign that read:

TELLURIDE ➞
CITY OF GOLD
12 MILES - 2 HOURS
YOU DON'T HAVE TO BE
CRAZY TO DRIVE THIS
ROAD - BUT IT HELPS

JEEPS ONLY

After repeated thefts of the sign, the local authorities stopped replacing it.
