= Ardentiella =

Scientific classification
- Kingdom: Animalia
- Phylum: Arthropoda
- Class: Malacostraca
- Order: Isopoda
- Suborder: Oniscidea
- Family: Armadillidae
- Genus: Ardentiella; Kästle & Regalado Fernández, 2025

Genus of woodlice

Ardentiella is a genus of woodlice belonging to the family Armadillidae. The type species for this genus was originally described as Armadillo bicoloratus by Gustav Budde-Lund in 1885. This species was then re-described as Ardentiella bicolorata and designated the type species for this genus in 2025 by Benedikt Kästle and Omar Rafael Regalado Fernández. There are currently two official species in this genus.

== Description ==
The dorsal surface of Ardentiella sp. is smooth and covered with small setae. Their cephalothorax has a small sheid that protrudes past the head and has a small indentation. The epimera (side plate) of their first thoracic segment has a rounded lobe. The epimera of their second to seventh thoracic segments are rectangular and sometimes narrow toward the end. Their pleotelson is keeled or convex. Their uropod is subtly triangular. They have small bumps on their first and second thoracic segments that more or less equidistant between anterior and posterior margins with successive pairs progressively closer to posterior and lateral margin.

== Distribution ==
The species currently accepted in this genus has been found in Myanmar and Thailand. Additional species awaiting description were found in China, Laos, and Vietnam.

== Etymology ==
The genus name Ardentiella is derived from the word "ardens" (Latin: “burning, fiery, ardent”) due to the striking black, yellow, and red colors displayed by many members of the genus.

== Species ==
- Ardentiella bicolorata (Budde-Lund, 1895)
- Ardentiella caerulea (Collinge, 1916)
