= Rubber Duck (album) =

Studio album by C. W. McCall
- Released: 1976
- Genre: Country
- Label: Polydor
- Producers: Chip Davis, Don Sears

C. W. McCall chronology
Wilderness (1976)	Rubber Duck (1976)	Roses for Mama (1977)

Professional ratings
Review scores
Source	Rating
AllMusic	3/5 stars

Rubber Duck is an album by country musician C. W. McCall, released on Polydor Records in 1976. It is his fourth album, released the same year as Wilderness, but concentrating on the themes the McCall character was popular for – trucking, as opposed to the various depictions of nature that could be found in Wilderness. Among others, the album contains the song "'Round the World with the Rubber Duck", a sequel to McCall's earlier wildly popular hit "Convoy", with many humorous and absurd elements added. "Audubon" is a quasi-autobiographical song, while "Ratchetjaw" is a take on trucker slang, with a multitude of CB-related terminology included in the lyrics.

As with most works credited to C. W. McCall, all of the songwriting on the album is credited to Bill Fries (a former advertising executive who adopted the C. W. McCall persona) as lyricist and vocalist, and Chip Davis, who wrote the music.

== Track listing ==
1. "'Round the World with the Rubber Duck" (Bill Fries, Chip Davis) – 4:08
2. "Audubon" (Fries, Davis) – 3:41
3. "Super Slab Showdown" (Fries, Davis)
4. "Windshield Wipers in the Rain" (Fries, Davis) – 3:41
5. "Sing Silent Night" (Fries, Davis)
6. "Ratchetjaw" (Fries, Davis) – 2:38
7. "Nishnabotna" (Fries, Davis)
8. "Two-Way Lovin'" (Fries, Davis)
9. "Camp Bird Mine" (Fries, Davis) – 3:36
10. "Niobrara" (Fries, Davis)

== Personnel ==
- C. W. McCall – vocals, design
- Milt Bailey, Christopher Cable, Mike Hirsch, Ruth Horn, Gary Morris, Mel Olsen, Jan Sheldrick, Jerry Smithers, Dick Solowicz, Sarah Westphalen – vocals
- Chip Davis – vocals, drums, Indian Whittle, producer, arranger
- Bill Berg, Don Simmons, Terry Wadell – drums
- Joan Allen, Jackson Berkey – keyboards
- Jimmy Johnson, Chuck Sanders – bass
- Eric Hansen – bass, harmonica
- Ron Cooley, Ron Steele – 12-string guitar, electric guitar
- Larry Morton – electric guitar
- Stu Basore – steel guitar
- Bobbie Thomas – banjo
- Mortimer Alpert, Irene Berudt, Myrtle Bowman, Dorothy Brown, Hugh Brown, Miriam Dufflemeyer, Jinni Eldred, Lucinda Gladics, James Hammond, Joe Landes, Beth McCollum, Barbara Potter, Merton Shatzkin, Alex Sokol, Phillip Wachowski – strings

=== Additional personnel ===
- Don Sears – producer, engineer, design, photography
- John Boyd, Ron Ubel – engineers

== Charts ==
Chart (1976)	Peak position
US Hot Country LPs	29
