= Wolf Creek Pass =

Mountain pass in Colorado, US

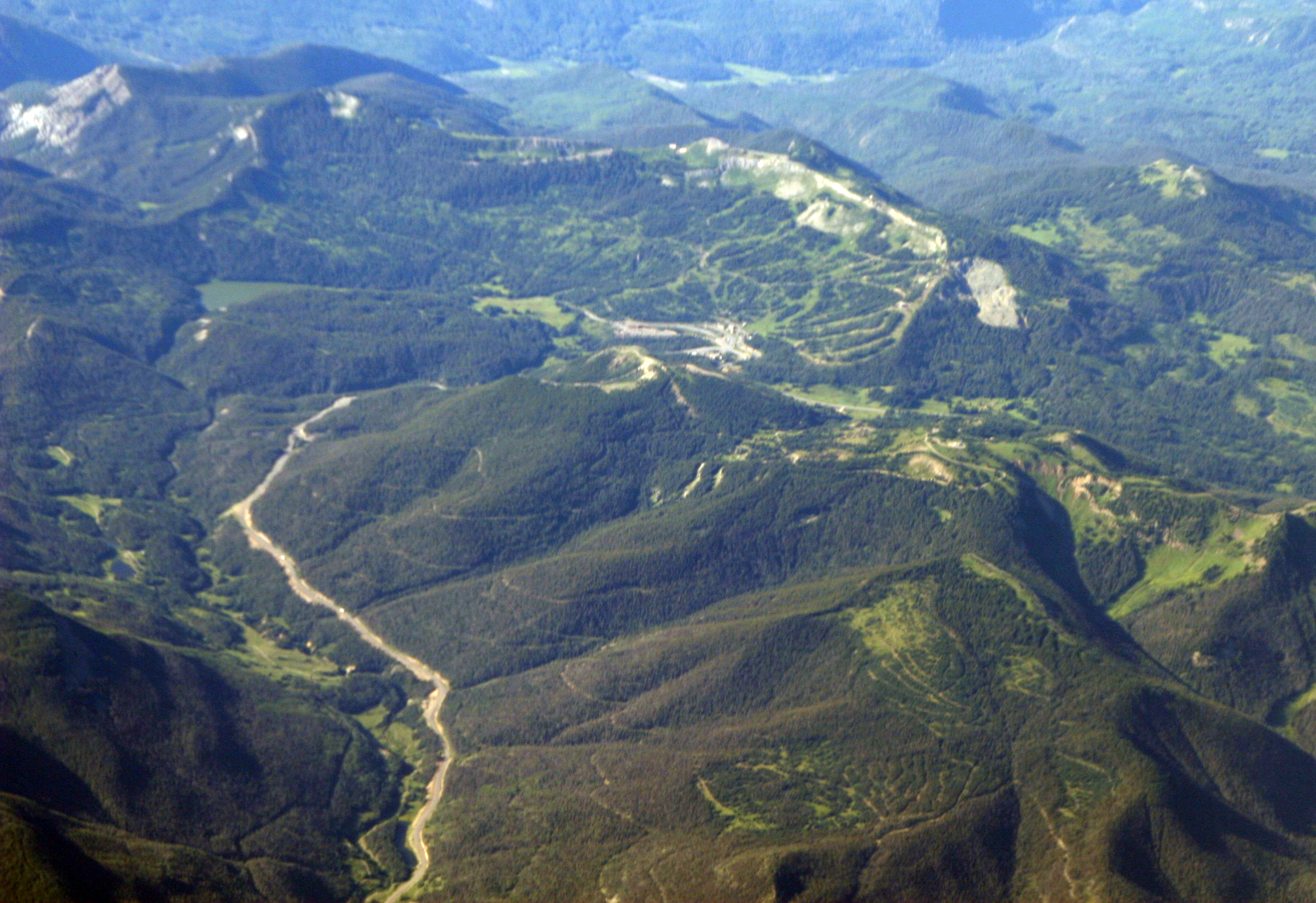
- Wolf Creek Pass and Ski Area, August 2008

- Location within Colorado
- Elevation: 10,857 ft (3,309 m)
- Traversed by: US 160

Location
- Location: Mineral County, Colorado, United States
- Range: San Juan Mountains
- Coordinates: 37°29′00″N 106°48′11″W
- Topo map: USGS Wolf Creek Pass

Wolf Creek Pass is a high mountain pass on the Continental Divide, in the San Juan Mountains of Colorado. It is the route through which U.S. Highway 160 passes from the San Luis Valley into southwest Colorado on its way to New Mexico and Arizona. The pass is notable as inspiration of a C. W. McCall song. The pass is significantly steep on either side (6.8% maximum grade) and can be dangerous in winter. There are two runaway truck ramps on the westbound side for truckers that lose control of their brakes.

== Expansion ==
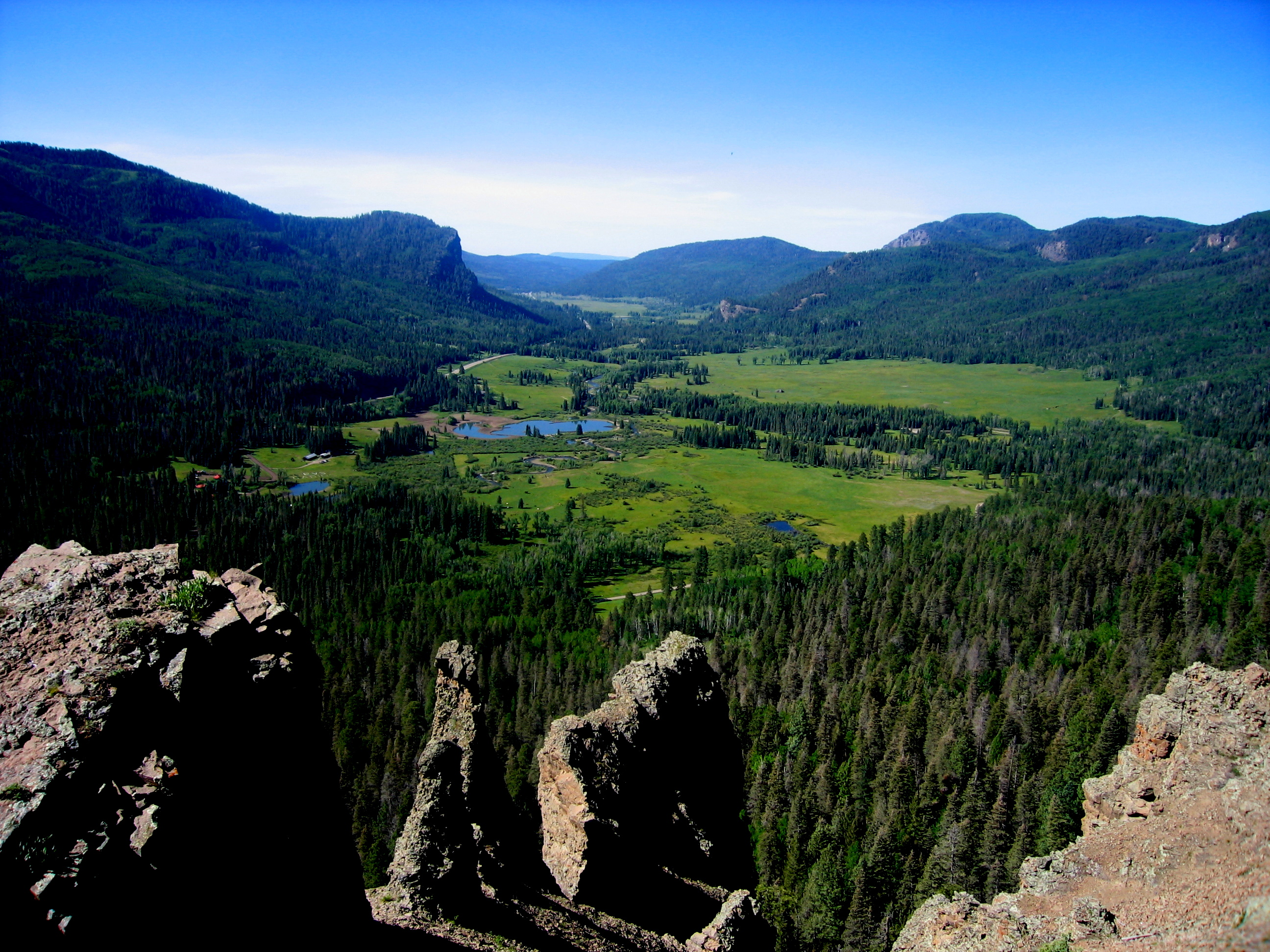
View to the south into the snaking West Fork of the San Juan River as seen from US 160, halfway up to the pass

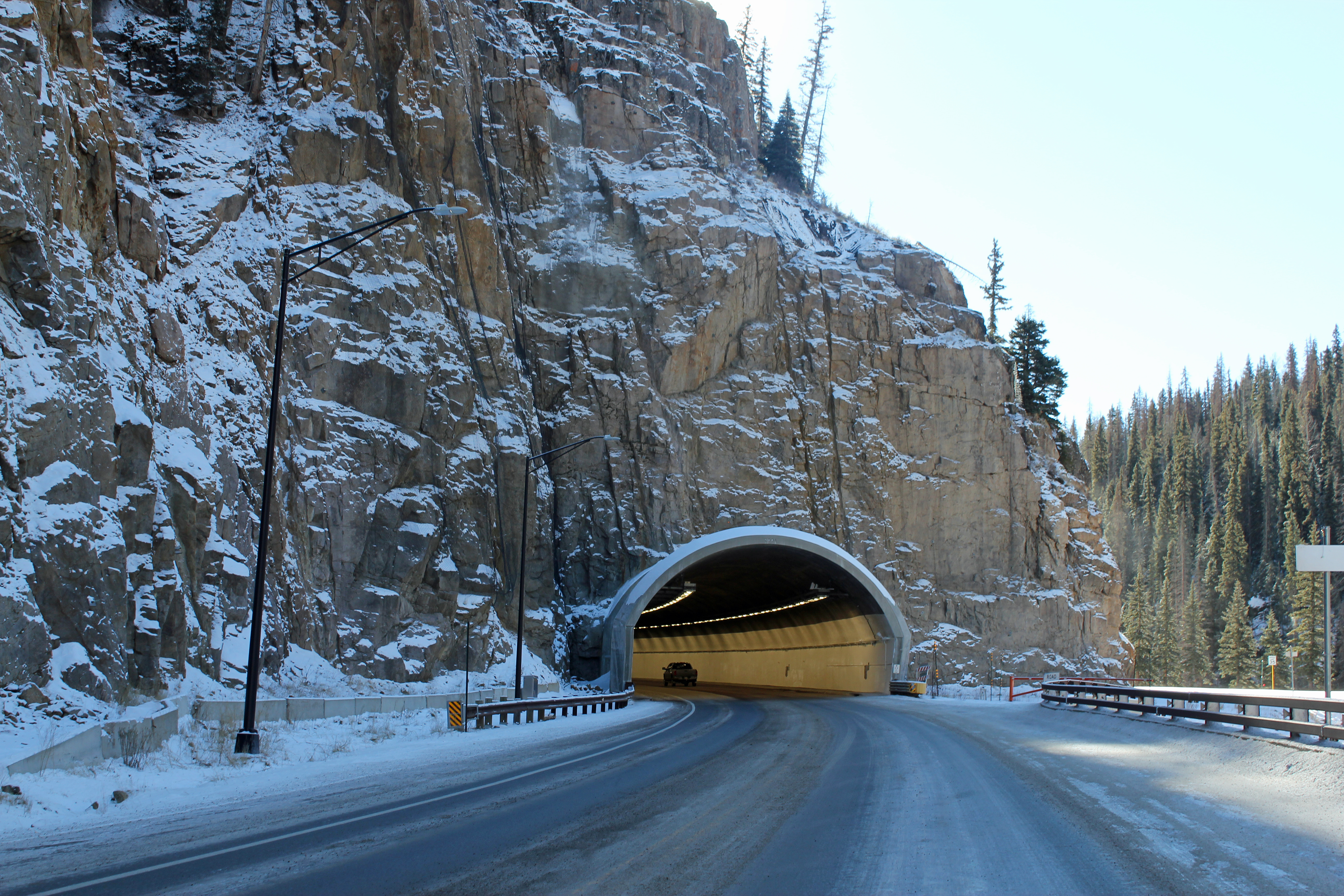
The tunnel on the east side of the pass, opened in 2005.

Wolf Creek Pass, once a two-lane road winding through the San Juan Mountains between South Fork, and Pagosa Springs, has been expanded into a multi-lane highway, greatly increasing the traffic capacity of the pass and making it more navigable in bad weather. It is the easiest access to southwest Colorado from the rest of the state, as all remaining overland routes require lengthy detours through New Mexico or over Lizard Head Pass, near Telluride, or the Red Mountain Pass, a two-lane road winding along sheer cliffs from Ouray to Silverton.

== History ==
The creation of the first road along Wolf Creek Pass began in 1911 and finished construction in 1916. The project's engineers were J. E. Maloney and Ed Riley. The 12-foot-wide (3.7 m) road was doubled in width in 1930 and was paved 20 years later.

A 900-foot (270 m) tunnel on the eastern portion was opened November 5, 2005. Construction was completed in the Summer of 2006, with the highway fully widened and drainage projects along the route completed.

== Attractions ==
The Lobo Overlook, at 11,760 feet (3,580 m) elevation on the north side of the pass, provides commanding views of the continental divide.

The pass is also home to Wolf Creek ski area on the eastern side of the Continental Divide on Highway 160. Also on the eastern side is one of the largest RV parks in the United States, located just a few miles west of South Fork.

Wolf Creek Pass is also an attraction for tourists, as it is known for the natural beauty of the wilderness that the highway passes through. Just west of the pass, Treasure Falls offers passersby a view of a mountain waterfall.

The main route of the Continental Divide Trail (CDT), which reaches from Mexico to Canada, passes through Wolf Creek Pass. North bound "thru hikers" usually hike through Wolf Creek Pass in June.

== Name ==
The pass was named for Wolf Creek, which starts near the top of the pass and flows down its western side to a confluence with the West Fork San Juan River in Mineral County.

== Controversy ==
For decades, a major resort project proposed by Texas billionaire Red McCombs has been causing controversy in the area. The proposed resort would be situated near the summit of the pass and support over 8,000 people. People familiar with the high alpine environment and water issues in the area question the wisdom of a resort style village at 10,000 feet (3,000 m) elevation. McCombs has been working with the Forest Service to acquire highway access to the property, which is an inholding.

Over several decades, the Forest Service has been the target of multiple lawsuits from community groups for incompletely assessing the environmental impacts of approving a highway access point to the property and withholding information requested through the Freedom of Information Act. Following the most recent lawsuit, the developers reached agreement not to break ground at the site until the case is resolved in court.

Opponents of the "Village" state that the development would likely harm a vital wildlife corridor between the Weminuche and South San Juan Wilderness areas, alter backcountry experiences on Wolf Creek Pass, compete with local businesses in nearby Pagosa Springs and South Fork, adversely affect rare fen wetlands, and stress water supplies in the Rio Grande watershed. Proponents claim the "Village" would improve the economics of the region.

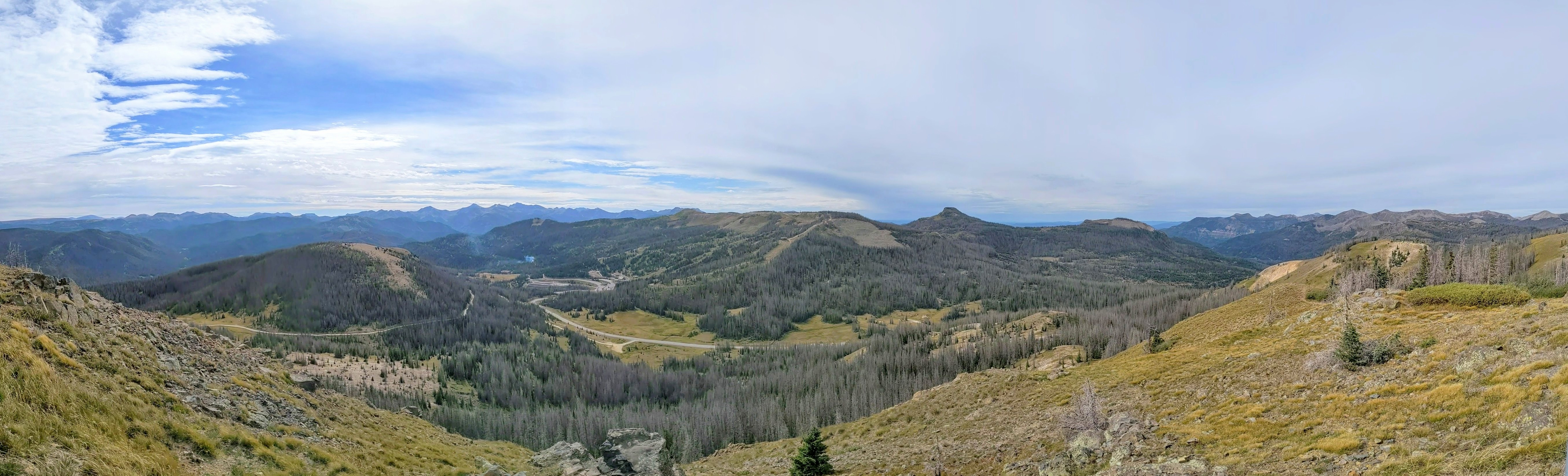
Panoramic view from the Lobo Overlook north of the pass, high on the continental divide, showing Highway 160 and the ski area

== C. W. McCall ==
Wolf Creek Pass was made famous in 1975 by country music artist C. W. McCall's spoken word song of the same name, in which the pass is described as "37 miles o' hell – which is up on the Great Divide." The song describes the truck careening down through a "tunnel" (losing several crates of chickens stacked on the back of the truck in the process) and eventually into a feed store in Pagosa Springs.

== Climate ==
Wolf Creek Pass has a subarctic climate (Dfc) with substantial precipitation year-round, though it may be called a subalpine climate due to it having a different climate than other climates on a similar latitude due to its high elevation. Summer usually consists of mild days and chilly nights. Winter consists of cold days with nightly lows close to zero lasting from early November to sometimes into April. Annual snowfall is heavy, averaging 392.1 inches (995.9 cm), one of the highest in the state, usually beginning by late September and not ceasing until early June. March averages the highest snowpack of the year at 67 inches (170 cm)).

Climate data for Wolf Creek Pass, Colorado, 1991–2020 normals, extremes 1986–present
Month	Jan	Feb	Mar	Apr	May	Jun	Jul	Aug	Sep	Oct	Nov	Dec	Year
Record high °F (°C)	50 (10)	54 (12)	63 (17)	64 (18)	74 (23)	78 (26)	82 (28)	77 (25)	74 (23)	65 (18)	65 (18)	54 (12)	82 (28)
Mean maximum °F (°C)	42.1 (5.6)	44.0 (6.7)	52.1 (11.2)	57.1 (13.9)	63.6 (17.6)	71.0 (21.7)	74.1 (23.4)	70.6 (21.4)	66.7 (19.3)	58.8 (14.9)	49.6 (9.8)	41.3 (5.2)	74.5 (23.6)
Mean daily maximum °F (°C)	28.7 (−1.8)	30.6 (−0.8)	38.2 (3.4)	44.0 (6.7)	52.2 (11.2)	61.5 (16.4)	65.7 (18.7)	63.3 (17.4)	56.6 (13.7)	46.4 (8.0)	35.4 (1.9)	27.4 (−2.6)	45.8 (7.7)
Daily mean °F (°C)	20.7 (−6.3)	21.7 (−5.7)	28.0 (−2.2)	33.7 (0.9)	42.1 (5.6)	51.1 (10.6)	55.5 (13.1)	53.8 (12.1)	48.0 (8.9)	38.2 (3.4)	27.3 (−2.6)	20.2 (−6.6)	36.7 (2.6)
Mean daily minimum °F (°C)	12.6 (−10.8)	13.0 (−10.6)	17.9 (−7.8)	23.2 (−4.9)	31.9 (−0.1)	40.8 (4.9)	45.3 (7.4)	44.2 (6.8)	39.0 (3.9)	30.0 (−1.1)	19.3 (−7.1)	12.8 (−10.7)	27.5 (−2.5)
Mean minimum °F (°C)	−4.9 (−20.5)	−3.4 (−19.7)	1.9 (−16.7)	9.2 (−12.7)	17.8 (−7.9)	30.1 (−1.1)	39.9 (4.4)	38.6 (3.7)	26.3 (−3.2)	13.5 (−10.3)	−0.2 (−17.9)	−7.4 (−21.9)	−10.7 (−23.7)
Record low °F (°C)	−25 (−32)	−21 (−29)	−14 (−26)	−1 (−18)	7 (−14)	17 (−8)	28 (−2)	24 (−4)	3 (−16)	−1 (−18)	−16 (−27)	−28 (−33)	−28 (−33)
Average precipitation inches (mm)	3.56 (90)	4.03 (102)	4.67 (119)	3.73 (95)	2.02 (51)	1.73 (44)	3.85 (98)	4.62 (117)	4.47 (114)	4.88 (124)	4.62 (117)	3.50 (89)	45.68 (1,160)
Average snowfall inches (cm)	57.7 (147)	63.6 (162)	66.7 (169)	46.9 (119)	12.3 (31)	0.6 (1.5)	0.0 (0.0)	0.0 (0.0)	4.2 (11)	27.0 (69)	57.4 (146)	55.7 (141)	392.1 (996.5)
Average extreme snow depth inches (cm)	72.5 (184)	88.7 (225)	92.5 (235)	83.8 (213)	66.3 (168)	25.1 (64)	1.3 (3.3)	1.7 (4.3)	2.5 (6.4)	10.0 (25)	28.6 (73)	58.6 (149)	97.0 (246)
Average precipitation days (≥ 0.01 in)	9.8	10.3	11.9	9.6	9.4	7.6	15.0	18.0	12.4	9.0	10.0	10.2	133.2
Average snowy days (≥ 0.1 in)	10.0	10.4	11.7	8.7	3.7	0.5	0.0	0.0	0.9	6.0	9.8	10.2	71.9
Source 1: NOAA (precip/precip days, snow/snow days 1981–2010)
Source 2: National Weather Service (snow depth 2006–2020)

The Upper San Juan SNOTEL weather station is situated nearby, to the south of Wolf Creek Pass's summit. Upper San Juan also has a subarctic climate (Köppen Dfc), but with a slightly lower average temperature and higher diurnal variation.

Climate data for Upper San Juan, Colorado, 1991–2020 normals, extremes 1983–present: 10200ft (3109m)
Month	Jan	Feb	Mar	Apr	May	Jun	Jul	Aug	Sep	Oct	Nov	Dec	Year
Record high °F (°C)	58 (14)	59 (15)	66 (19)	66 (19)	79 (26)	81 (27)	83 (28)	79 (26)	76 (24)	68 (20)	61 (16)	55 (13)	83 (28)
Mean maximum °F (°C)	49.4 (9.7)	49.1 (9.5)	54.8 (12.7)	59.6 (15.3)	66.3 (19.1)	74.1 (23.4)	76.7 (24.8)	73.8 (23.2)	70.3 (21.3)	62.9 (17.2)	55.1 (12.8)	49.5 (9.7)	77.3 (25.2)
Mean daily maximum °F (°C)	34.7 (1.5)	35.3 (1.8)	42.1 (5.6)	47.2 (8.4)	55.3 (12.9)	65.1 (18.4)	69.1 (20.6)	66.7 (19.3)	60.7 (15.9)	50.6 (10.3)	40.9 (4.9)	34.2 (1.2)	50.2 (10.1)
Daily mean °F (°C)	19.5 (−6.9)	20.4 (−6.4)	26.7 (−2.9)	32.8 (0.4)	41.3 (5.2)	49.5 (9.7)	54.5 (12.5)	52.9 (11.6)	46.9 (8.3)	37.6 (3.1)	26.8 (−2.9)	19.7 (−6.8)	35.7 (2.1)
Mean daily minimum °F (°C)	4.1 (−15.5)	5.4 (−14.8)	11.1 (−11.6)	18.4 (−7.6)	27.3 (−2.6)	34.0 (1.1)	39.8 (4.3)	39.1 (3.9)	33.1 (0.6)	24.4 (−4.2)	12.6 (−10.8)	5.1 (−14.9)	21.2 (−6.0)
Mean minimum °F (°C)	−13.1 (−25.1)	−12.2 (−24.6)	−7.3 (−21.8)	2.9 (−16.2)	14.9 (−9.5)	27.0 (−2.8)	34.0 (1.1)	33.1 (0.6)	23.4 (−4.8)	10.3 (−12.1)	−7.8 (−22.1)	−13.7 (−25.4)	−16.7 (−27.1)
Record low °F (°C)	−25 (−32)	−21 (−29)	−17 (−27)	−9 (−23)	1 (−17)	20 (−7)	27 (−3)	25 (−4)	13 (−11)	−7 (−22)	−20 (−29)	−29 (−34)	−29 (−34)
Average precipitation inches (mm)	6.03 (153)	6.14 (156)	5.08 (129)	3.68 (93)	2.85 (72)	1.08 (27)	2.42 (61)	3.55 (90)	3.55 (90)	4.35 (110)	4.85 (123)	5.86 (149)	49.44 (1,253)
Average extreme snow depth inches (cm)	71.4 (181)	87.6 (223)	88.8 (226)	72.7 (185)	45.2 (115)	9.4 (24)	1.5 (3.8)	1.7 (4.3)	3.6 (9.1)	7.7 (20)	23.1 (59)	58.9 (150)	94.3 (240)
Average precipitation days (≥ 0.01 in)	13.7	14.3	13.6	12.0	10.8	5.1	10.0	12.3	9.6	10.0	10.7	13.1	135.2
Source 1: XMACIS2 (snow depth 2006–2020)
Source 2: NOAA (Precipitation)
