= Wilderness (C. W. McCall album) =

Studio album by C. W. McCall
- Released: 1976
- Genre: Country
- Length: 33:37
- Label: Polydor
- Producer: Chip Davis, Don Sears

C. W. McCall chronology
| Black Bear Road (1975) | Wilderness (1976) | Rubber Duck (1976) |

Professional ratings
Review scores
| Source | Rating |
|---|---|
| Allmusic | 4/5 stars |

Wilderness is an album by country musician C. W. McCall, a pseudonym of singer and advertising executive Bill Fries, released on Polydor Records in 1976 (see 1976 in music). As its title suggests, it focuses on subjects connected with nature, the environment and humans' impact on them. "There Won't Be No Country Music (There Won't Be No Rock 'n' Roll)", for example, is a statement on the environment's bleak-looking future and the effects of over-commercialization bordering on propaganda. "Crispy Critters", on the other hand, is the humorous telling of a true tale involving a group of hippies riding into a town and being forced away and threatened by the mayor.

Like most works credited to C. W. McCall, Bill Fries provides vocals, and all songs are written by Fries and Chip Davis.

== Track listing ==
1. "Wilderness" (Bill Fries, Chip Davis) – 3:38
2. "Jackson Hole" (Fries, Davis) – 2:39
3. "Riverside Slide" (Fries, Davis) – 3:22
4. "Crispy Critters" (Fries, Davis) – 2:50
5. "Roy" (Fries, Davis) – 0:35
6. "The Little Brown Sparrow and Me" (Fries, Davis) – 3:57
7. "There Won't Be No Country Music (There Won't Be No Rock 'N' Roll)" (Fries, Davis) – 3:50
8. "Telluride Breakdown" (Fries, Davis) – 2:08
9. "Four Wheel Cowboy" (Fries, Davis) – 3:27
10. "Silver Iodide Blues" (Fries, Davis) – 1:17
11. "Columbine" (Fries, Davis) – 1:45
12. "Aurora Borealis" (Fries, Davis) – 4:09

== Personnel ==
- C. W. McCall - Vocals, Design
- Ron Agnew, Almeda Berkey, Gary Morris, Carol Rogers, Jan Sheldrick, Kris Sparks, Sarah Westphalen - Vocals
- Chip Davis - Vocals, Drums, Producer, Arranger
- Milt Bailey, Jackson Berkey - Vocals, Keyboards
- Ron Cooley - 12-String Guitar, Electric Guitar
- Eric Hansen - Bass
- Steve Hanson - Banjo
- Dick Solowicz - Pots and Pans
- Chris Stoval - Chimes
- Mortimer Alpert, Bruce Bransby, Ruth Bransby, Dorothy Brown, Hugh Brown, Miriam Dufflemeyer, Ginni Eldred, Lucinda Gladics, James Hammond, Jean Hassel, Joe Landes, Gary Lawrence, Beth McCollum, Martin Pearson, Gertrude Phalp, Barbara Potter, Merton Shatzkin, Alex Sokol - Strings
- Robert Jenkins, Willis Ann Ross - Woodwinds
- Gene Badgett, Michael Berger, Frank Franano, Steve Miller, David Reiswig, Richard Scott, Jim Schanilec, Jim Shoush, Dan Strom, Don Swaggard, Bill Trumbauer, Stephen Wager, Mike Young - Brass

=== Additional personnel ===
- Don Sears - Producer, Engineer, Design, Photography
- John Boyd - Engineer
- Dudycha, Schirck and Associates, Inc. - Art Direction and Production

== Charts ==
Album - Billboard (North America)

| Year | Chart | Position |
|---|---|---|
| 1976 | Country Albums | 9 |
| 1976 | Pop Albums | 143 |

Singles - Billboard (North America)

| Year | Single | Chart | Position |
|---|---|---|---|
| 1976 | "There Won't Be No Country Music (There Won't Be No Rock 'N' Roll)" | Country Singles | 19 |
| 1976 | "Old Home Filler-up an' Keep on a-Truckin' Cafe" | Pop Singles | 73 |
| 1976 | "Crispy Critters" | Country Singles | 32 |
| 1976 | "Four Wheel Cowboy" | Country Singles | 88 |
