= C. W. McCall & Co. =

Studio album by C. W. McCall
- Released: January 1979
- Genre: Country
- Label: Polydor Records
- Producer: Chip Davis, Don Sears

C. W. McCall chronology
Roses for Mama (1977)	C. W. McCall & Co. (1979)	C. W. McCall's Greatest Hits (1983)

C. W. McCall & Co. is country musician C. W. McCall's sixth and last album of original songs, released on Polydor Records in 1979 (see 1979 in music), before McCall (or, more accurately, Bill Fries, the man playing his role) announced his retirement from the music industry. Out of the ten tracks, only one ("The Little Things in Life") was written as a collaboration between McCall and Chip Davis, Fries's songwriting partner, while one other, "Silver Cloud Breakdown", was composed by Davis several years earlier and was featured in the movie Convoy, though it was not present on its soundtrack.

== Track listing ==
1. "Outlaws and Lone Star Beer" (Bob Duncan, John Durril) – 1:56
2. "Wheels of Fortune" (Terry Skinner, J.L. Wallace)
3. "City of New Orleans" (Steve Goodman)
4. "The Little Things in Life" (Bill Fries, Chip Davis) – 2:43
5. "The Cowboy" (Ron Agnew)
6. "Milton" (Agnew)
7. "Flowers on the Wall" (Lew DeWitt)
8. "Silver Cloud Breakdown" (Fries, Davis)
9. "I Wish There was More That I Could Give" (Walt Meskell, Tim Martin)
10. "Hobo's Lullaby" (Goebel Reeves)

== Personnel ==
- C. W. McCall - Vocals, Design
- Jackson Berkey, Walt Meskell, Ron Agnew, Gary Morris, Sarah Westphalen, Ruth Horn, Milton E. Bailey III Esq. - Vocals
- Chip Davis - Vocals, Drums, Percussion, Producer, Arranger
- Jackson Berkey - Keyboards
- Eric Hansen - Bass
- Ron Agnew - 6-String Guitar
- Walt Meskell - 6-String Guitar, National Guitar, Banjo
- Steve Hanson - Banjo
- Ron Cooley - 6-String Guitar, 12-String Guitar, Electric Guitar
- Steve Basore - Steel Guitar
- Steve Shipps, Sue Robinson, David Lowe, Dorothy Brown, Hugh Brown, Miriam Dufflemeyer, Lucinda Gladics, James Hammond, Joe Landes, Beth McCollum, Merton Shatzkin, Alex Sokol - Strings

=== Additional personnel ===
- Don Sears - Producer, Engineer
- Jim Wheeler, John Boyd, Ron Ubel - Engineers
- Dudycha & Associates, Inc. - Art Direction and Production

== Charts ==
Singles - Billboard (North America)

Year	Single	Chart	Position
1978	"Outlaws and Lone Star Beer"	Country Singles	81
