= Ardentiella caerulea =

Scientific classification
- Kingdom: Animalia
- Phylum: Arthropoda
- Clade: Pancrustacea
- Class: Malacostraca
- Order: Isopoda
- Suborder: Oniscidea
- Family: Armadillidae
- Genus: Ardentiella
- Species: A. caerulea

Binomial name
- Ardentiella caerulea (Collinge, 1916)

Synonyms
- Cubaris caerulea Collinge, 1916; Cubaris caeruleus Collinge, 1916

Species of woodlouse

Ardentiella caerulea is a species of woodlouse in the family Armadillidae, often referred to as the "yellow panda" in the pet trade. This species was officially described by Benedikt Kästle and Omar Rafael Regalado Fernández in 2025 from a specimen collected in 1914 by Walter Edward Collinge.

== Description ==
Reports differ but this species grows to a maximum length of between 12 and 14 millimeters. The anterior margin of their frontal shield is almost straight in dorsal view. Their second antennae segment is 2.5 times the length of first segment. The outer lobe of their maxilla is twice as wide as the inner lobe. The outer margin of their maxilliped is convexly rounded and its endite has three terminal setae. The epimera (side plates) of their first segment has an acutely rounded anterior corner and an acute posterolateral corner. The epimera of their second to seventh segments are rectangular with a rounded anterolateral corner and posterolateral corner that weakly projects posteriorly. The epimera of their third to fifth pleon segments are rectangular. Their pleotelson is strongly convex, with rounded posterolateral corners and a strongly conves posterior margin. Their uropod fills gap between their fifth pleon segment and their pleotelson. Their uropod protopodite is elongated, and is roughly 1.3 times as long as it is wide, with a rectangular distal portion. Uropod exopodite almost reaches the tip of protopodite. The uropod endopodite has a long terminal setae and almost reaches posterior tip of protopodite.

== Distribution ==
The species is native to Thailand and Myanmar. The type specimen for this species was captured in Kayin State in Myanmar.

== Pet Trade ==
Ardentiella caerulea like many other isopod species is a sought after organism in the pet trade. They come in several colour morphs that have a grey base and yellow and/or orangey red spots. As for many isopods in the pet trade, A. caerulea has not been assessed for IUCN protection and its wild population is not well monitored so it is not known if poaching is depleting wild numbers of this species.
