= Wolf Creek Pass (album) =

Studio album by C. W. McCall
- Released: January 1975
- Genre: Country
- Length: 29:10
- Label: MGM
- Producer: Chip Davis, Don Sears

C. W. McCall chronology
| Wolf Creek Pass (1975) | Black Bear Road (1975) |

Professional ratings
Review scores
| Source | Rating |
|---|---|
| Allmusic | 3/5 stars |

Wolf Creek Pass, The Old Home Filler-up an' Keep on a-Truckin' Cafe (and Other Wild Places.) is the debut album by country musician C. W. McCall, released in 1975 (see 1975 in music) on MGM Records. It was recorded after the success of a song included in the album, "Old Home Filler-up an' Keep on a-Truckin' Cafe", which was used in a popular television commercial that helped make McCall famous. McCall in the commercials was portrayed by a silent Jim Finlayson, with a first-person voiceover by Bill Fries; Fries, who had co-created the character with future Mannheim Steamroller founder Chip Davis, took over as the face and voice of the character with the album's release, taking on the stage name "C. W. McCall" for the rest of his life (Finlayson's character would change initials to "A.J." afterward). The album concentrated predominantly on themes related to trucking, with many of them based on events in Fries' life. The album also contained the eponymous song "Wolf Creek Pass", which helped popularize the actual mountain pass (located in Colorado) itself. The actual "Old Home Filler-up an' Keep on a-Truckin' Cafe" was located in Pisgah, Iowa.

== Track listing ==
All tracks composed by Bill Fries and Chip Davis

1. "Wolf Creek Pass" – 3:55
2. "Night Rider" – 2:30
3. "Classified" – 2:28
4. "Old 30" – 2:20
5. "I've Trucked All Over This Land" – 2:46
6. "Four Wheel Drive" – 2:58
7. "Rocky Mountain September" – 3:10
8. "Old Home Filler-up an' Keep on a-Truckin' Cafe" – 2:45
9. "Sloan" – 3:08
10. "Glenwood Canyon" – 3:10

== Personnel ==
- C. W. McCall - vocals, design
- Carol Rogers, Liz Westphalen (The Puffys) - vocals
- Terry Waddell, Bill Berg - drums
- Curtis McPeake, Bobbie Thomas - banjo
- Larry Morton, Ron Agnew - guitar
- Chuck Sanders, Eric Hansen - bass
- Ron Steele - 12-string, 6-string electric guitar
- Gregg Fox - 12-string guitar
- Jackson Berkey - keyboards
- Chip Davis - producer, arranger, drums, strings
- Don Sears - producer, engineer, design
- Ron Ubel - engineer
- Steve Kline - photography

The title track was covered by Australian singer Lester Coombs. Lyrics were changed to fit Australian geography. "Old 30" was covered in the mid-seventies by Australian radio DJ John Laws. His version was entitled "Old 31 One More Time" and also modified to provide a moving portrait of Australian scenery.

== Charts ==
=== Weekly charts ===
| Chart (1975) | Peak position |
|---|---|
| US Billboard 200 | 143 |
| US Top Country Albums (Billboard) | 4 |

=== Year-end charts ===
| Chart (1975) | Position |
|---|---|
| US Top Country Albums (Billboard) | 27 |

=== Singles ===
| Year | Single | Chart | Position |
|---|---|---|---|
| 1974 | "Old Home Filler-up an' Keep on a-Truckin' Cafe" | Country Singles | 19 |
| 1974 | "Old Home Filler-up an' Keep on a-Truckin' Cafe" | Pop Singles | 54 |
| 1974 | "Wolf Creek Pass" | Country Singles | 12 |
| 1974 | "Wolf Creek Pass" | Pop Singles | 40 |
| 1975 | "Classified" | Country Singles | 13 |
