= C. W. McCall =

American art director, singer-songwriter and mayor (1928–2022)

Background information
- Also known as: William Dale Fries Jr.
- Born: Billie Dale Fries; November 15, 1928; Audubon, Iowa, U.S.
- Died: April 1, 2022 (aged 93) Ouray, Colorado, U.S.
- Genres: Country; outlaw country; truck-driving country
- Occupations: Graphic artist; set designer; art director; singer-songwriter
- Years active: 1945–2022
- Labels: MGM; Polydor; Mercury; American Gramaphone

Mayor of Ouray, Colorado
- In office 1986–1992

William Dale Fries Jr. (November 15, 1928 – April 1, 2022) was an American commercial artist who won several Clio Awards for his advertising campaigns. He was also a musician remembered for his character C. W. McCall, a truck-driving country singer that he created for a series of bread commercials while working for an Omaha advertising agency as an art director. Fries performed as McCall in a series of outlaw albums and songs in the 1970s, in collaboration with co-worker Chip Davis who also founded Mannheim Steamroller.

McCall's most successful song was "Convoy", a surprise hit in 1975, reaching number one on the Billboard Hot 100 chart and number two in the UK Singles Chart in March 1976. After a successful spell of touring, Fries retired to Ouray, Colorado, where he was elected mayor, serving from 1986 to 1992. The "Convoy" song became an anthem for the Freedom Convoy protests in 2022 and Fries enjoyed this revival before he died of cancer at the age of 93.

== Early life ==
McCall was born Billie Dale Fries on November 15, 1928, in Audubon, Iowa, the son of William Dale "Billie" Fries Sr. and Margaret Fries. He later legally changed his name to William Dale Fries, Jr. One of his sons is now Bill Fries III.

His family was musical; Bill Sr., a farm equipment factory foreman by day, performed with his two brothers in The Fries Brothers Band and played the violin while Margaret played the piano and the two played ragtime together at dances. Bill Sr. frequently hauled prefabricated swine barns to customers, which introduced Bill Jr. to the world of trucking. Bill Jr. first performed at the age of three in a local talent contest, singing "Coming ' Round the Mountain" while his mother played the piano. He studied music at school, playing the clarinet and the music of John Philip Sousa and became the drum major for the school's marching band. As a child, he enjoyed listening to country music, but he was even more interested in art, having started copying the cartoon characters of Walt Disney as a child. He went to the Fine Arts School at the University of Iowa where he majored in commercial art and also performed in the university's symphony orchestra, but he had to leave the university after one year because he could not afford to compete with recently returned WWII veterans for jobs to pay tuition, as the many discharged soldiers were going through college on the GI Bill of Rights. He then returned to Audubon to work as a signwriter.

In 1950, he got a job as a commercial artist with KMTV in Omaha, Nebraska. He worked for them for ten years, doing graphic work, lettering and set design. He also supported the local ballet and opera societies, doing work which won an award from the Omaha Artists and Art Directors Club. This attracted the attention of Bozell & Jacobs which was a local advertising agency and they gave him a job as an art director, doubling his salary.

== Advertising ==
In 1973, while working for Bozell & Jacobs, Fries created a television advertising campaign for Old Home Bread. The bread was trucked across the Midwest from the Metz Baking Company plant in Sioux City, Iowa. As the big semi-trailer trucks carrying the Old Home Bread logo were a familiar sight on the highway, this suggested a trucking theme.

The advertisements were narrated by a trucker named "C. W. McCall," played by Jim Finlayson. The name was inspired by McCall's magazine, which Fries had on his desk at the time. A James Garner movie, Cash McCall, was also an influence. To complete the name, Fries added initials, shown embroidered on the trucker's shirt, and chose "C. W." for country and western.

In each commercial, the trucker's mission was to deliver a load of Old Home Bread to the Old Home Café, whose name expanded over time to become the "Old Home Fill 'Er Up An' Keep On a-Truckin' Café". There, a waitress named Mavis (played by Jean McBride Capps as a Marilyn Monroe bombshell) awaited the bread delivery. McCall would later joke that Capps "was built like a couple of cub scouts trying to put up a Sears Roebuck pup tent." The character Mavis was named after a real waitress at the White Spot café in Audubon where Fries grew up. At the end of the ad campaign of twelve different spots, the C. W. McCall character proposes marriage to Mavis, who accepts.

Each commercial featured a distinctive country spoken-word patter song full of folksy trucker jargon. Fries wrote the lyrics and recorded the vocals; Chip Davis, who wrote jingles at Bozell & Jacobs, composed the musical accompaniment. These pieces strongly foreshadowed, both in style and structure, the musical releases Fries would soon create as his C. W. McCall musician character.

The commercial won a Clio Award.

== Musical career ==
The success of the ad campaign led Fries to embark on a commercial recording career, cloaked in the identity of the McCall character from the Old Home Bread commercials. Fries first charted the song "Wolf Creek Pass", which reached No. 40 on the U.S. pop top 40 in 1975. Two other songs reached the Billboard Hot 100, "Old Home Filler-Up an' Keep on a-Truckin' Cafe", as well as the environmentally-oriented "There Won't Be No Country Music (There Won't Be No Rock 'n' Roll)".

Fries is best known for the 1976 No. 1 hit song, "Convoy" which was inspired by his own experience of driving in a growing group of vehicles out of Denver. In its style and composition, the song is a direct echo of Fries's Old Home Bread commercial songs: a first-person trucker spoken monologue, backed by a country arrangement and interspersed with a gentle choral call-and-response. But the theme is rebellious instead of sentimental: truckers coordinating by CB radio to rebel against the new federal speed limit of 55 mph. The mix of anti-authority feeling and country authenticity was immensely popular, and helped feed a nationwide craze for CB radios and trucker culture. The single sold over two million copies and was awarded a gold disc by the RIAA in December 1975. Classically-trained Chip Davis, who wrote the music to the song, won Country Music Writer of the Year in 1976 for his work with McCall, despite not liking the genre; the success allowed him to launch his instrumental project Mannheim Steamroller, which became particularly well-known for its Christmas records.

A dozen C. W. McCall songs appeared on Billboard's Hot Country Singles chart, including the sentimental "Roses for Mama" (1977). "Classified" and "'Round the World with the Rubber Duck" (a pirate-flavored sequel to "Convoy") bubbled under the Hot 100. The majority of McCall's hits were written by the team of Fries and Davis; only "Roses For Mama" and the low-charting "Outlaws And Lone Star Beer" were penned by outside writers.

In 1978, the movie Convoy was released, based on the C. W. McCall song. The film starred Kris Kristofferson, Ali MacGraw, Burt Young, and Ernest Borgnine and was directed by Sam Peckinpah. It featured a new version of the song, with lyrics written specifically for the plot of the film.

But by the time of the movie's release, the trucking fad was waning. In 1979, Fries retired from the music business, although he recorded a few songs in later years. He voiced more commercials, including ads for Kern's bread featuring the actors he had made popular with Old Home.

In addition to the "original six" McCall albums released between 1975 and 1979, two rare singles exist. "Kidnap America" was a politically/socially-conscious track released in 1980 during the Iran hostage crisis, while "Pine Tar Wars" referred to an event that actually happened in a New York Yankees–Kansas City Royals baseball game during 1983 (a dispute concerning the application of a large quantity of pine tar to a baseball bat used by George Brett, one of the Royals' players).

The song "Convoy" is featured in Grand Theft Auto V. In 2014, Rolling Stone ranked "Convoy" No. 98 on their list of 100 Greatest Country Songs.

== Politics and later life in Ouray ==
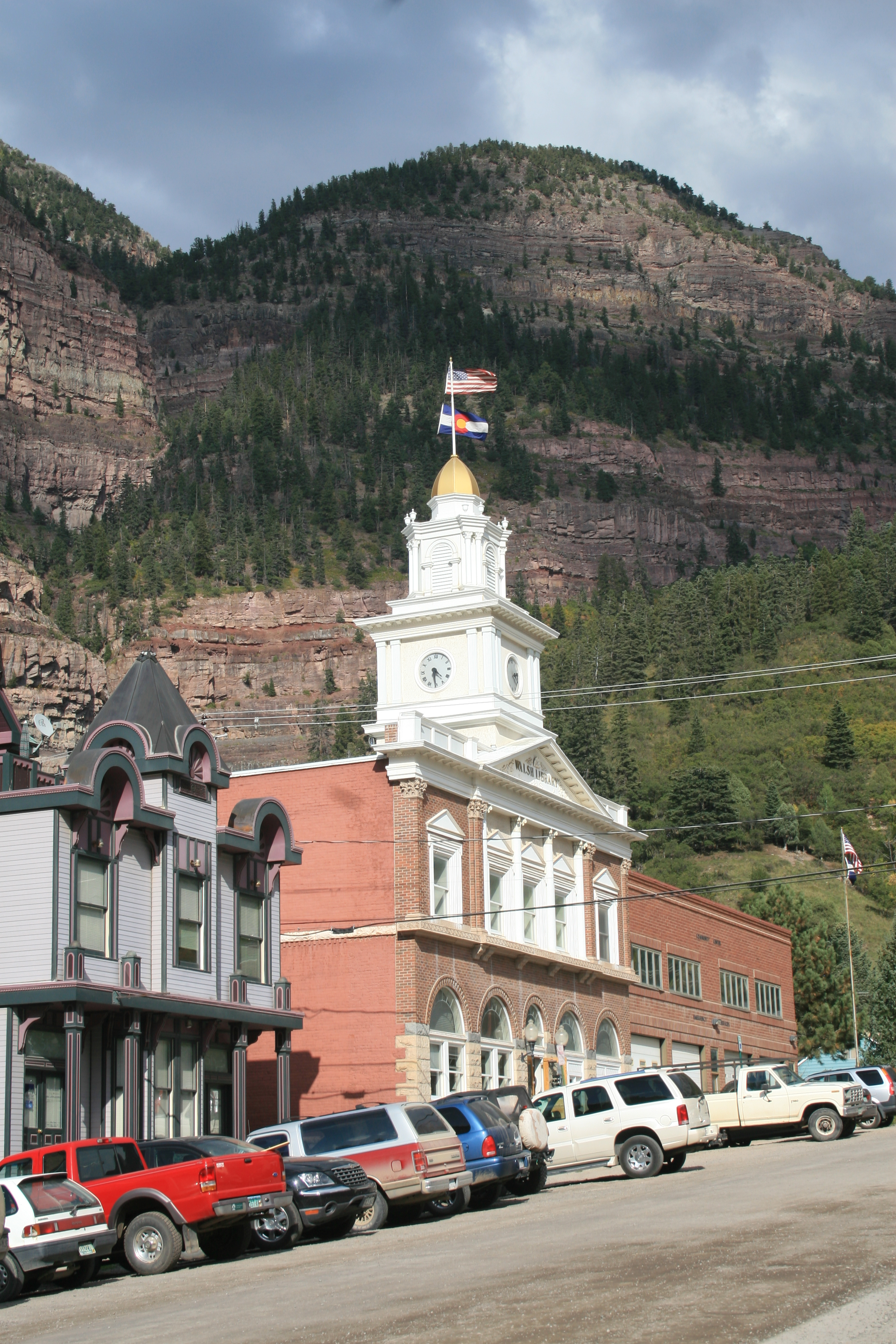
Ouray City Hall, which was created as a replica of Independence Hall, was restored after a fund-raising campaign led by Bill Fries as mayor

Fries and his family vacationed in Ouray, Colorado, during the 1960s. They then bought a summer home there after the financial success of "Convoy." When Fries stopped touring, he retired to Ouray with his family. In 1986, Fries was elected mayor of the town and served three terms of two years each. His main achievement as mayor was to restore the historic city hall, which had burned down in 1950. Another major project was the San Juan Odyssey. This was an audiovisual exhibition which had originally been a slide show at Wright's Opera House. C. W. McCall had provided the narration for this in 1979 and it was shown to hundreds of thousands of visitors until the show closed in 1996. He then revised and digitized the production so that it could be shown in modern formats such as DVD.

On February 9, 2022, while conducting what would be his final interview with The Drew and Mike Podcast, he gave his blessing for the use of his signature song "Convoy" for the Freedom Convoy protests in Canada, with Taste of Country noting that he was "energized and enthusiastic" about the revival of interest in the song and its message.

== Personal life ==
Fries married Rena Bonnema on February 15, 1952; the two remained married for 70 years. At the time of his death, he had three children, four grandchildren, six great-grandchildren and one great-great-grandchild. His hobbies included model railroading and working on his old military jeep.

Fries died from complications of cancer on April 1, 2022, at age 93.

== Discography ==
=== Studio albums ===
Year	Album details	Peak chart positions					Certification (sales threshold)
Year	Album details	US Country	US	AUS	CAN	NZ	Certification (sales threshold)
1975	Wolf Creek Pass: Released: January 1975; Label: MGM Records	4	143	—	—	—	
1975	Black Bear Road: Released: September 1975; Label: MGM Records	1	12	49	16	19	US certification: Gold
1976	Wilderness: Released: 1976; Label: Polydor Records	9	143	—	—	—	
1976	Rubber Duck: Released: 1976; Label: Polydor Records	29	—	—	—	—	
1977	Roses for Mama: Released: 1977; Label: Polydor Records	22	—	—	—	—	
1979	C. W. McCall & Co.: Released: 1979; Label: Polydor Records	—	—	—	—	—	
1990	The Real McCall: An American Storyteller: Released: 1990; Label: American Gramaphone	—	—	—	—	—	
2003	American Spirit (with Mannheim Steamroller): Released: May 20, 2003; Label: American Gramaphone	—	—	—	—	—	
"—" denotes releases that did not chart

=== Compilation albums ===
Year	Album details	Peak positions
Year	Album details	US Country
1978	C. W. McCall's Greatest Hits: Released: 1978; Label: Polydor Records	45
1989	Four Wheel Cowboy: Released: 1989; Label: PolyGram Records	—
1991	The Legendary C. W. McCall: Released: 1991; Label: PolyGram Records	—
1997	The Best of C. W. McCall: Released: 1997; Label: PSM Records	—
"—" denotes releases that did not chart

=== Singles ===
Year	Single	Peak chart positions									Album
Year	Single	US Country	US	CAN Country	CAN	CAN AC	UK	AUS	NZ	AUT	Album
1974	"Old Home Filler-Up an' Keep On-a-Truckin' Cafe"	19	54	12	44	44	—	—	—	—	Wolf Creek Pass
1974	"Wolf Creek Pass"	12	40	46	—	—	—	—	—	—	Wolf Creek Pass
1975	"Classified" (Shelby County Tribune)	13	101	45	—	—	—	—	—	—	Wolf Creek Pass
1975	"Black Bear Road"	24	—	42	—	—	—	—	—	—	Black Bear Road
1975	"Convoy"	1	1	4	1	13	2	1	1	19	Black Bear Road
1976	"There Won't Be No Country Music (There Won't Be No Rock 'n' Roll)"	19	73	8	77	37	—	77	—	—	Wilderness
1976	"Crispy Critters"	32	—	—	—	—	—	—	—	—	Wilderness
1976	"Four Wheel Cowboy"	88	—	—	—	—	—	—	—	—	Wilderness
1976	"'Round the World with the Rubber Duck"	40	101	40	—	—	—	—	—	—	Rubber Duck
1977	"Audubon"	56	—	—	—	—	—	—	—	—	Rubber Duck
1977	"Roses for Mama"	2	—	5	—	—	—	74	—	—	Roses for Mama
1978	"Outlaws and Lone Star Beer"	81	—	—	—	—	—	—	—	—	C. W. McCall & Co.
1980	"Kidnap America"	—	—	—	—	—	—	—	—	—	—
"—" denotes releases that did not chart

== Bibliography ==
- Bernhardt, Jack. (1998). "C. W. McCall" in The Encyclopedia of Country Music. Paul Kingsbury, Editor. New York: Oxford University Press. p. 333.
