= Roses for Mama (song) =

Single by C.W. McCall

from the album Roses for Mama
- Released: September 1977 (U.S.)
- Recorded: 1977
- Genre: Country
- Length: 3:24
- Label: Polydor 14420
- Songwriter(s): Johnny Wilson, Gene Dobbins, Wayne Sharpe

C.W. McCall singles chronology
"Audubon" (1977)	"Roses for Mama" (1977)	"Outlaws and Lone Star Beer" (1979)

"Roses for Mama" is a song recorded by country music artist C. W. McCall and covered by Red Sovine, and was a top 5 hit for McCall in 1977. The song was also covered, in German, by Austrian singer Jonny Hill in 1979.

One of McCall's numerous recitations released during the 1970s, "Roses for Mama" differed from his usual novelty-style tales. Instead, this song focuses on a traveller's kind-hearted actions toward a motherless boy.

== Content ==
The narrator is travelling to Florida to vacation with an old friend when he makes a stop in a small town in Georgia. During the stop, he calls his mother in Chapel Hill, Tennessee, to wish her a happy birthday and plans to wire her some roses. At the flower shop, he runs into a teary-eyed 5-year-old boy. The boy is upset because he cannot afford to purchase roses for his mother, whom he says he has not seen in almost a year.

The boy tells his story about living with his grandfather (grandmother in McCall's version) and that he had promised to purchase five roses (the number of his age) to celebrate his mother's birthday, but had only a dime to spend. The story touches the narrator's heart, and he agrees to fund the boy's purchase. The boy buys his bouquet and disappears from the shop, but then rushes back to thank the generous stranger.

Later, as the narrator is driving out of town, he sees the boy at an old cemetery, kneeling by what turns out to be his mother's grave. After the boy explains that "this is where my mother stays," the narrator decides that he is taking his own mother for granted and decides to take his rose bouquet to give to her in person.

== Chart performance ==
The McCall character was considered by some to be a one-hit wonder, for his 1975 hit "Convoy," despite his charting several other country hits during the same time period. However, "Roses for Mama" became a big hit in the fall of 1977, peaking at No. 2 on the Billboard magazine Hot Country Singles chart; it did not, however, cross over to the Hot 100 pop chart. "Roses for Mama" would be McCall's last top-40 country hit.

Chart (1977)	Peak position
Australia (Kent Music Report)	74
Canadian RPM Country Playlist	5
US Hot Country Songs (Billboard)	2
