= Convoy (1978 film) =

1978 film by Sam Peckinpah

- US film poster
- Directed by: Sam Peckinpah
- Screenplay by: B. W. L. Norton
- Based on: "Convoy" by Bill Fries; Chip Davis
- Produced by: Robert M. Sherman
- Starring: Kris Kristofferson; Ali MacGraw; Burt Young; Madge Sinclair; Franklyn Ajaye; Ernest Borgnine
- Cinematography: Harry Stradling, Jr.
- Edited by: John Wright; Garth Craven
- Music by: Chip Davis
- Production company: EMI Films
- Distributed by: United Artists
- Release dates: June 10, 1978 (Japan); June 28, 1978 (U.S.)
- Running time: 111 minutes
- Country: United States
- Language: English
- Budget: $12 million
- Box office: $45 million

Convoy is a 1978 American road action film directed by Sam Peckinpah from a screenplay by Bill L. Norton, and starring Kris Kristofferson, Ali MacGraw, Ernest Borgnine, Burt Young, Madge Sinclair and Franklyn Ajaye. The film is based on the 1975 country and western novelty song "Convoy" by C. W. McCall. The story initially concerns truck drivers being extorted by a sheriff in Arizona. One of them punches the sheriff during a brawl. Several rebellious truckers then attempt to cross the state line to New Mexico, while being pursued by the police. They also make plans to rescue an ally who is held captive in Texas, and who has been the victim of police brutality.

The film was first released in Japan on June 10, 1978, and it was released June 28, 1978 in the United States by United Artists. It received mixed reviews from critics; however, it was the most commercially successful film of Peckinpah's career.

Convoy was made when the CB radio/trucking craze was at its peak in the United States, and followed the similarly themed films Moonfire (1970), Duel (1971), Deadhead Miles (1973), Hijack (1973), White Line Fever (1975), Smokey and the Bandit (1977), La Menace (1977) and Breaker! Breaker! (1977).

== Plot ==
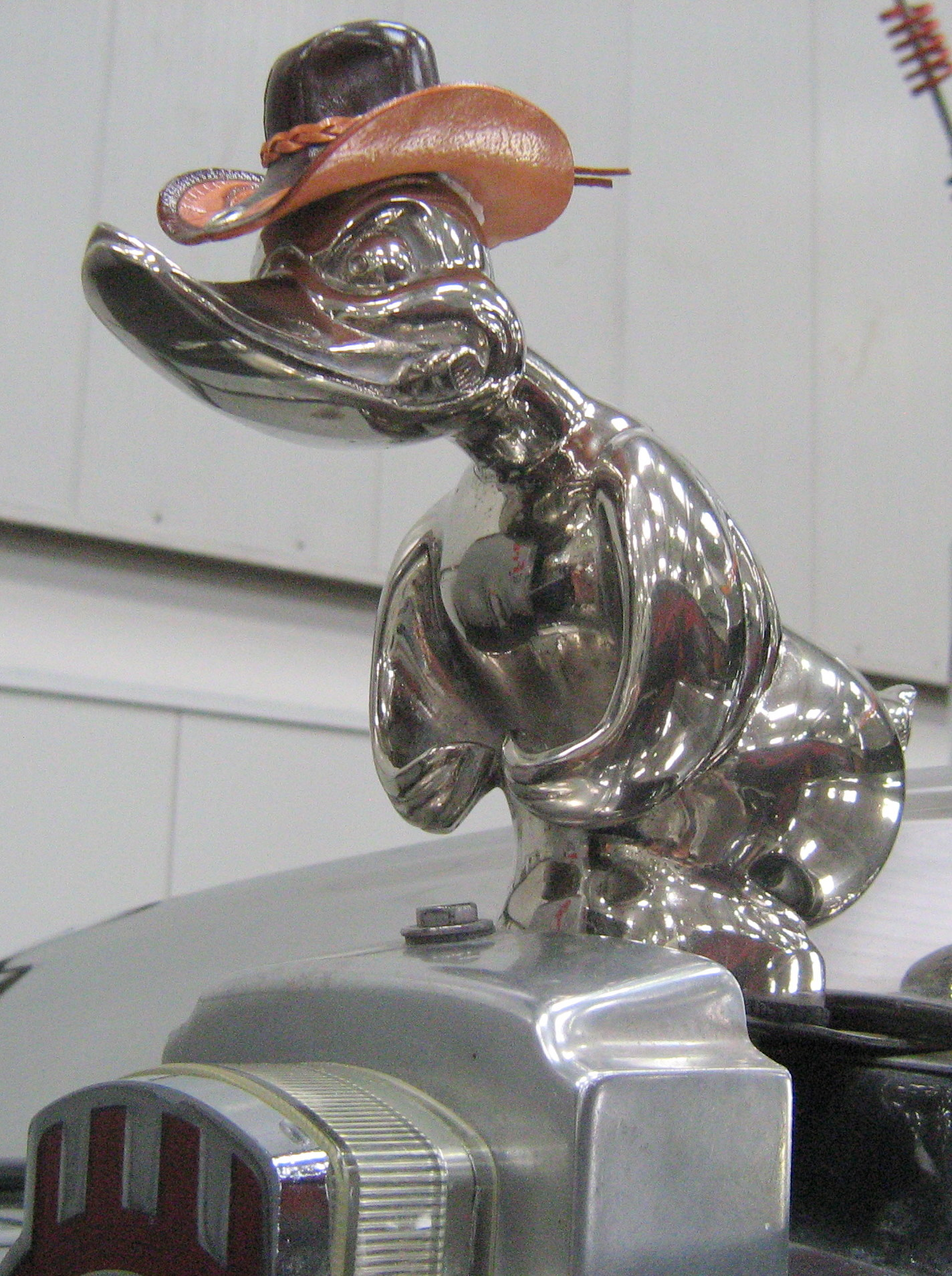
Replica of the hood ornament of Rubber Duck's truck

In the Arizona desert, truck driver Martin "Rubber Duck" Penwald is passed by a woman in a Jaguar XK-E, escapes being given a citation by the Arizona Highway Patrol thanks to the Jaguar, then runs into fellow truck drivers Pig Pen/Love Machine and Spider Mike. Another "trucker" had informed them over the CB radio that they are okay to increase their speed. The "trucker" turns out to be Sheriff "Dirty" Lyle Wallace, a long-time nemesis of the Duck, who extorts them for $70 each.

The truckers head on to Rafael's Glide-In where the Duck's sometime girlfriend, Violet, works as a waitress. Melissa, the driver of the Jaguar, is also there; her car broke down and she had to sell it and some of her belongings in an effort to reach Dallas, as she is on her way to look for a job. The Duck offers Melissa a ride; Violet is unimpressed and ushers him away to give him a special birthday present. While they are away, Wallace shows up at the Glide-In checking plates. Pig Pen and Spider Mike start making fun of Wallace over the diner's base-station CB radio, leading to Wallace attempting to falsely arrest Spider Mike for vagrancy. The Duck enters and tries to smooth things over, but Mike punches Wallace when he makes a crack about the father of the baby that Mike's pregnant woman is expecting. This leads to a brawl in the diner when some AHP state troopers arrive to assist Wallace. The assorted truckers prevail and decide to head for the state line to avoid prosecution while messing with the police cars while the cops are knocked out.

The truckers drive across Arizona and New Mexico, with Wallace in pursuit. Duck angers Wallace even further when he accidentally pushes him off the road and causes him to crash. When Wallace calls for reinforcements from the state police, Duck leads the truckers off the main highway and down a rough dusty desert trail, causing several of the police cars to crash, while Wallace's state police vehicle is crushed between Pig Pen and Spider Mike's rigs. As the rebellious truckers evade and confront the police, Rubber Duck becomes a reluctant hero.

The Governor of New Mexico, Jerry Haskins, meets Rubber Duck at his request, after being told that the Governor has ideas of using the National Guard on the convoy after Rubber Duck and his convoy manage to avoid a New Mexico State Police roadblock and then get their escort through town due to Rubber Duck carrying hazardous materials. About the same time, Wallace and a brutal Texas sheriff arrest Spider Mike (who had left the convoy to be with his wife after she gave birth to their son) in Alvarez, Texas. Wallace's plan is to use Mike as bait to trap Rubber Duck. A janitor at the jail, aware of the plan, sends messages by CB radio that Spider Mike has been wrongfully arrested and beaten. Various truckers relay the message to New Mexico.

Rubber Duck ends the meeting with Haskins and leaves to rescue Spider Mike. Several other truckers join him in heading east to Texas. The truckers eventually destroy half of the town and the jail and rescue Spider Mike. Knowing they will now be hunted by the authorities, the truckers head for the border of Mexico. On the way, Rubber Duck gets separated from the rest of the convoy when the others get stopped by a minor traffic accident involving Pig Pen/Love Machine. In a showdown near the United States-Mexico border, Rubber Duck is forced to face Wallace, the Texas Highway Patrol, and a National Guard unit stationed on a bridge. Firing an M60 machine gun, Wallace, the Texas DPS troopers, and the Guardsmen cause the truck's tanker trailer to explode, while Rubber Duck deliberately steers the tractor unit over the side of the bridge, plummeting into the churning river below, presumably sending Duck to his death. Melissa witnesses this from the shoreline once she realized Duck's intention after he had her get out of his truck and tossed out her luggage as well so she wouldn't be harmed, while Pig Pen/Love Machine and the other members of the convoy blare their horns in mourning. Even Wallace looks remorseful over the demise of his long-time adversary.

A public funeral is held for Rubber Duck. A distraught Melissa is led to a school bus with several "long-haired friends of Jesus" inside that had joined the convoy earlier. There she finds Rubber Duck in disguise sitting in the back - revealing that he had swum from the wreckage after the tractor sank into the river. The convoy takes to the road with the coffin in tow, presumably heading for Washington, D.C.. As the bus passes Wallace, he spots the Duck and bursts into laughter over seeing that his adversary survived.

== Cast ==
- Kris Kristofferson as Martin "Rubber Duck" Penwald
- Ali MacGraw as Melissa
- Ernest Borgnine as Sheriff Lyle "Cottonmouth" Wallace
- Burt Young as Bobby "Love Machine" / "Pig Pen"
- Madge Sinclair as Widow Woman
- Franklyn Ajaye as "Spider" Mike
- Brian Davies as Chuck Arnoldi
- Seymour Cassel as Governor Jerry Haskins
- Cassie Yates as Violet Wallace
- Walter Kelley as Agent Hamilton
- Billy Hughes as "Pack Rat"
- Jorge Russek as Sheriff "Tiny" Alvarez
- Patrice Martinez as Maria
- Donnie Fritts as Reverend Sloane
- Tommy Bush as Chief Stacey Love
- Spec O'Donnell as "18 Wheel Eddie"
- Bill Foster as "Old Iguana"

== Production ==
The film was mostly financed by Britain's EMI Films, who had invested in Peckinpah's Cross of Iron.

Convoy was filmed almost entirely in the state of New Mexico. Production began in 1977 when the CB radio/trucking craze was at its peak, made during the same period as such films as La Menace, Smokey and the Bandit, The Great Smokey Roadblock, Breaker! Breaker!, Handle with Care (1977 film) (all 1977), High-Ballin' and Steel Cowboy (both 1978), as well as the television series Movin' On (1974–1976) and B. J. and the Bear (1979–1981).

During this period of Sam Peckinpah's life, it was reported that he suffered from alcoholism and drug addiction. His four previous films, Cross of Iron (1977), The Killer Elite (1975), Bring Me the Head of Alfredo Garcia (1974), and Pat Garrett and Billy the Kid (1973), had struggled at the box office, and the director needed a genuine blockbuster success. Unhappy with the screenplay written by B. W. L. Norton, Peckinpah tried to encourage the actors to re-write, improvise and ad-lib their dialogue, with little success. In another departure from the script, Peckinpah attempted to add a new dimension to the film by casting a pair of black actors as members of the convoy: Madge Sinclair as Widow Woman and Franklyn Ajaye as Spider Mike. When the convoy made a sharp turn at an intersection, the white 1972 Brockway 361 truck of Widow Woman accidentally tipped over, nearly crashing into a car. The scene was added to the movie with a joke about colors, and Widow Woman had to carry on as passenger.

Peckinpah hired long-time friend James Coburn as a second-unit director; Coburn allegedly directed some scenes, filling in for Peckinpah when he was impaired by drugs or alcohol.

The original rough cut of Convoy, assembled by Peckinpah and his long-time editor Garth Craven in early 1978, had an estimated running time of 220 minutes. According to the book If They Move ... Kill 'Em!: The Life and Times of Sam Peckinpah by David Weddle and the Convoy documentary Passion & Poetry: Sam's Trucker Movie, Peckinpah's rough cut did not have any musical score other than the title song and "Blow The Gates To Heaven" by Richard Gillis (who had previously worked with Peckinpah on The Ballad of Cable Hogue). Jerry Fielding, who composed music for many of Peckinpah's previous films, was also hired to do the score for Convoy.

After a second screening of Peckinpah's rough cut, EMI executive Michael Deeley fired Peckinpah and Craven from the film in mid-March 1978 and promoted editor Graeme Clifford to supervising editor, to drastically reduce the running time of the film for a June 1978 release. Garner Simmons, author of Peckinpah: A Portrait in Montage, said that EMI and Clifford's version of Convoy "cut the guts out of it".

Questioned about the production of Convoy during an interview in July 1978, Peckinpah is quoted as saying: "In preparing Cross of Iron I kept hearing on Armed Forces radio this song about “We'll hit the gate goin' 98, Let them truckers roll, Ten-Four!” and I said “By God, I'd like to be out on that highway!” And so I got out there, but I ended up not being there at all."

The picture finished eleven days behind schedule at a cost of $12 million, more than double its original budget.

The famous scene where the tanker truck goes off a bridge and explodes was filmed in Needles, California, on a one-way bridge over the Colorado River between Arizona and California. The Needles City Fire Department provided fire protection during this scene. The bridge was removed soon afterward, as a new span connected the two sides of the river.

Peckinpah has a cameo as a sound man during an interview scene. Rubber Duck's truck is generally represented in the film as a 1977 Mack RS712LST, although several other Mack RS700L–series trucks were used as a double and as stationary props. The restored 'Second Unit' 1970 Mack RS731LST on-camera–double truck tractor and the only original remaining tank trailer were to return in late 2023 to be on display at the National Museum of Transportation in St. Louis, Missouri.

Pig Pen's truck is also generally represented in the film as a 1977 Mack Cruiseliner WL786LST, although a 1973 Kenworth K-123 was used as a stunt double.

== Release ==
The film was released in Japan in mid-June 1978 before opening in 700 theaters in the United States and Canada on June 28, 1978.

=== Critical reception ===
Though Convoy was a commercial success, and maintains a robust cult following, it received mixed reviews from critics upon its initial release. It holds an approval rating of 58% on Rotten Tomatoes, based on 19 reviews. On Metacritic, the film has a score of 47 based on 13 critics, indicating mixed or average reviews.

Vincent Canby of The New York Times wrote that the film "has been made before much less expensively and much more entertainingly by directors with no aspirations to be artists. 'Convoy' is a bad joke that backfires on the director. He has neither the guts to play the movie straight as melodrama nor the sense of humor to turn it into a kind of 'Smokey and the Bandit' comedy. The movie is a big, costly, phony exercise in myth-making, machismo, romance-of-the-open-road nonsense and incredible self-indulgence." Arthur D. Murphy of Variety wrote, "Sam Peckinpah's 'Convoy' starts out as 'Smokey And The Bandit,' segues into either 'Moby Dick' or 'Les Miserables,' and ends in the usual script confusion and disarray, the whole stew peppered with the vulgar excess of random truck crashes and miscellaneous destruction ... Every few minutes there's some new roadblock to run, alternating with pithy comments on The Meaning Of It All. There's a whole lot of nothing going on here." Gene Siskel of the Chicago Tribune gave the film 1.5 stars out of 4 and wrote, "Save for a car sailing through the roof of a barn, 'Convoy' is sluggish entertainment, the first road race film in which I rooted for the cops against the good guys. Kristofferson's getting caught would have made a shorter and better picture." Charles Champlin of the Los Angeles Times called the film "a multivehicle wreck of a movie" and "slack stuff, missing as a sizzling love story, missing as the kind of funny anti-authoritarian statement the song was, arriving well past the peak of the CB phenomenon, making no statement one way or the other about trucks or truckers." Gary Arnold of The Washington Post wrote that the film "suggests a shotgun misalliance of 'Billy Jack' and 'Smokey and the Bandit,'" and all Peckinpah could do with the "stupid material" was "to pretend he's getting somewhere by noisily spinning his wheels. More often than not even his visual pyrotechnics falls short, and he's left trying to rationalize nonsensical characters and conflicts by imposing his sentimentalities about men of war on them." John Pym of The Monthly Film Bulletin was generally positive, writing, "What sets this apart from other recent citizen-band road movies is the skill with which Peckinpah redefines the artifacts of the Western, which is what Convoy transparently remains. It has lines of cavalrymen, a cattle drive, a secret trail to Mexico, a circular camp site, innocent bar-room fisticuffs and a hero who, while caring nothing for women, at the same time reveres the married man and his homestead ... The adroitness of mood is perhaps best characterized by the moment when, his audience having been softened by the surrounding exuberance, Peckinpah slips into place such a poignantly sentimental moment as the departure of Spider Mike for his hometown."

Empire gave the film a 3 out of 5 stars, stating "A noisy but enjoyable destruction derby of a film, sadly with none of the subtlety, invention or skill of Spielberg's Duel."

=== Box office ===
The film grossed $4 million in Japan in its first nine days. Convoy was the highest grossing picture of Peckinpah's career, grossing $45 million at the United States and Canada box office.

The film was huge hit in the USSR (Soviet Union). It was released in November of 1985, with 39,500 tickets sold. Since then it has developed a cult status.

=== Home media ===
On April 28, 2015, Kino Lorber released Convoy on DVD and Blu-ray. It was eventually released again on 4K Ultra HD Blu-ray on August 5, 2025, by Kino Lorber. In 2024, Imprint released the film on 4K Ultra Blu-ray in Australia, which contains both theatrical and extended cuts of the film.

== Soundtrack ==
Features:

- "Convoy" by C. W. McCall (a new version, written especially for the film, with saltier language)
- "Lucille" by Kenny Rogers
- "Cowboys Don't Get Lucky All the Time" by Gene Watson
- "Don't It Make My Brown Eyes Blue" by Crystal Gayle
- "I Cheated on a Good Woman's Love" by Billy "Crash" Craddock
- "Okie From Muskogee" by Merle Haggard
- "Southern Nights" by Glen Campbell
- "Blanket on the Ground" by Billie Jo Spears
- "Keep on the Sunny Side" by Doc Watson
- "Walk Right Back" by Anne Murray

== Novelization ==
A paperback novelization of the film by screenwriter B.W.L. Norton (ISBN 9780440112983) was published in 1978. A more serious edge and less humor was given to the film's story and there are some changes and additions, such as no mention of Spider Mike being African-American, a definite hatred between Rubber Duck and Wallace, a fight between Rubber Duck and Wallace after Spider Mike is broken out of jail, Widow Woman getting married (for the fifth time) and a background story given to Melissa.
