= Black Bear Road (album) =

Studio album by C. W. McCall
- Released: September 1975
- Recorded: 1975
- Genre: Country
- Length: 28:49
- Label: MGM Records
- Producers: Chip Davis, Don Sears

C. W. McCall chronology
Wolf Creek Pass (1975)	Black Bear Road (1975)	Wilderness (1976)

Professional ratings
Review scores
Source	Rating
AllMusic	<refBlack Bear Road at AllMusic</ref>

Black Bear Road is an album by country musician C. W. McCall, released on MGM Records in 1975. It is largely considered the album which gave him the most significant boost of his career, almost entirely due to the hit novelty song, "Convoy", that reached number one on both the Billboard country and pop albums charts. The song itself was largely responsible for starting a nationwide citizens' band radio craze. The song "Black Bear Road" in turn popularized the now-infamous road itself, along with its "You don't HAVE to be crazy to drive this road - but it helps" sign.

== Track listing ==
All songs on the original LP release are credited as being written by "C.W. McCall - Bill Fries - Chip Davis". Bill Fries is the real name of C.W. McCall.

1. "Black Bear Road" – 2:00
2. "The Silverton" – 2:50
3. "Lewis and Clark" - 2:23
4. "Oregon Trail" - 2:54
5. "Ghost Town" – 3:42
6. "Convoy" – 3:48
7. "Long Lonesome Road" – 2:10
8. "Green River" – 3:10
9. "Write Me a Song" - 2:20
10. "Mountains on My Mind" - 3:56

== Personnel ==
- C. W. McCall - Vocals, Design
- Sarah Westphalen, Carol Rogers (The Puffys), Dick Solowicz, Milt Bailey, Dick Ronelle, Tom Sinclair - Background Vocals
- Ron Cooley - Guitar
- Bobbie Thomas - Guitar, 5-String Banjo, 4-String Banjo, Pedal Steel Guitar
- Ron Steele - Guitar, 4-String Banjo
- Steve Hanson - Mandolin, 5-String Banjo
- Jackson Berkey - Keyboards, Timpani, Percussion
- Eric Hansen, Jimmy Johnson, Brian Sampson - Bass
- Chip Davis - Drums, Producer, Arranger
- Bill Berg, Don Simmons - Drums
- Gene Badgett - Trumpet
- Dave Kappy - French Horn
- Bill Buntain - Bass Trombone
- Jim Schanilec - Tuba
- Hugh Brown, Dorothy Brown, Merton Shatzkin, Martin Pearson, Alex Sokol, Joe Landes, Beth McCollum, Miriam Duffelmeyer - Strings

=== Additional personnel ===
- Don Sears - Producer, Engineer, Design, Photography
- John Boyd - Engineer
- Sheri Leverich - Art Director
- Dudycha, Schirck & Assoc., Inc. - Art/Production

== Charts ==
=== Weekly charts ===
Chart (1975–1976)	Peak position
Australia Albums (Kent Music Report)	49
US Billboard 200	12
US Top Country Albums (Billboard)	1

=== Year-end charts ===
Chart (1976)	Position
US Top Country Albums (Billboard)	2
