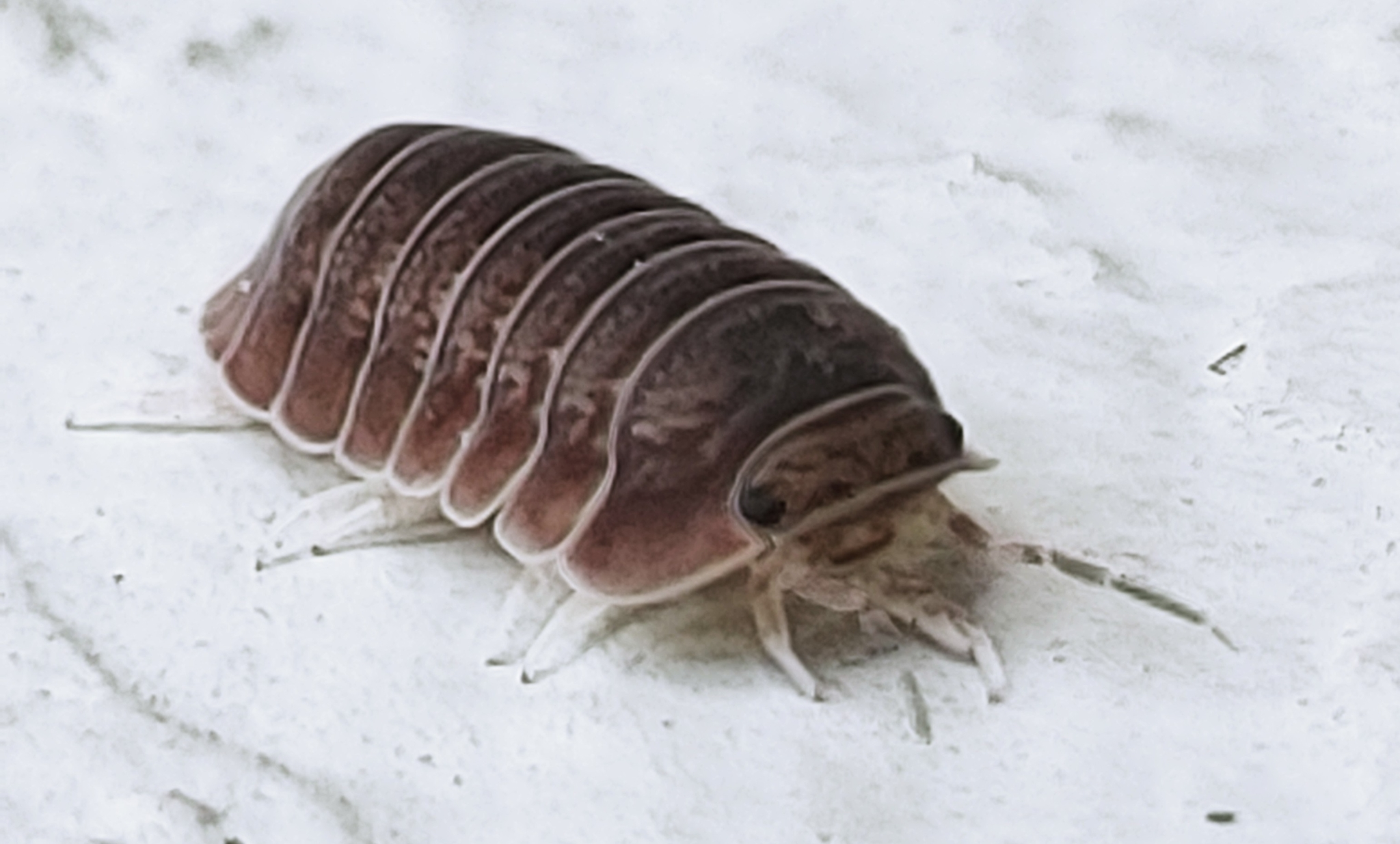

Scientific classification
- Kingdom: Animalia
- Phylum: Arthropoda
- Clade: Pancrustacea
- Class: Malacostraca
- Order: Isopoda
- Suborder: Oniscidea
- Family: Armadillidae
- Genus: Cubaris
- Species: C. murina

Binomial name
- Cubaris murina Brandt, 1833

= Cubaris murina =

Species of crustacean

Cubaris murina, commonly known as the little sea isopod or little sea roly poly, is a species of woodlouse in the family Armadillidae (genus Cubaris). It is found in North America, Africa, South America, Australasia, tropical Asia, and the Pacific Ocean.

== Description ==
Cubaris murina may reach a length of 11 millimeters and a width of 5 millimeters. It is capable of rolling into a ball when disturbed; this ability is known as conglobation.

== Distribution ==
C. murina is known to occur in Cuba, Puerto Rico, Jamaica, Saint Thomas Island in the U.S. Virgin Islands, and Oahu, in North America; Brazil and Cayenne, French Guiana in South America; the Seychelle Islands in the Indian Ocean, and Sumatra, Indonesia, in Southeast Asia. It is possible that the species was introduced to the Americas from Asia.

== As pets ==
Cubaris murina has become popular as a pet in the exotic animal hobby. They have practical applications in improving the health of terrariums by serving as a bioactive clean-up crew, and are also valued for the attractive appearance of some of its color morphs (slang for observed polymorphism). Known morphs of Cubaris murina in hobbyist collections include:

- Papaya - A dull pink variety that is believed by some to be the expression of some form of albinism
- Glacier - An almost completely white variety with white eyes, legs, and antennae
- Anemone - A variety with a calico or speckled visual pattern of orange and grey
- Florida Orange - An orange variety isolated from a few wild caught individuals in Florida, which gives them their name
