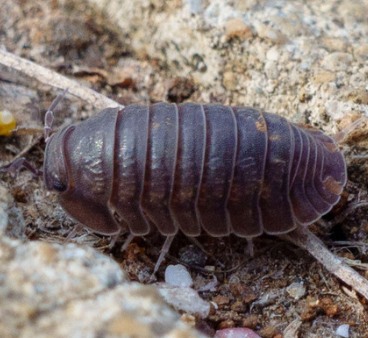
- Cubaris murina

Scientific classification
- Kingdom: Animalia
- Phylum: Arthropoda
- Clade: Pancrustacea
- Class: Malacostraca
- Order: Isopoda
- Suborder: Oniscidea
- Family: Armadillidae
- Genus: Cubaris; Brandt, 1833

Type species
- Cubaris murina

Diversity
- at least 100 species

= Cubaris =

Genus of woodlice

Cubaris is a genus of woodlice in the family Armadillidae. There are more than 100 described species in the genus Cubaris.

== Behavior and reproduction ==
Cubaris species have, on average, lower reproduction rates and longer lifespans than other genera of isopod.

Members of the genus Cubaris are well known for their ability to conglobate, or roll up into a ball, along with other genera such as Armadillidium.

== Classification ==
Cubaris was coined in 1833, from the type species Cubaris murina. In 1935, the genus Nesodillo was considered a synonym of Cubaris. Only in 1998 was Nesodillo re-established as a separate genus. The two genera still cause confusion when it comes to identification and classification, and there are likely species in each genus that belong in the other. Cubaris pronyensis, Cubaris plastica, Cubaris incisa, and Cubaris pacifica are a few examples of Cubaris species which were placed in Nesodillo at some point.

In recent years Cubaris has become a wastebasket taxon, resulting in many species being placed in the genus even when they do not necessarily fit the original description. This has resulted in Cubaris becoming a vague genus that often strays from its correct description. Researchers have recommended a comprehensive revision of the genus.

== As pets ==
Isopods considered part of Cubaris are often in fairly high demand within the pet isopod hobby. Many of the Cubaris species within the hobby are either undescribed or unidentified, and are referred to as "Cubaris sp.", though some have ended up being moved to other genera. One example of this is Nesodillo arcangelii, which was incorrectly identified as Cubaris sp.

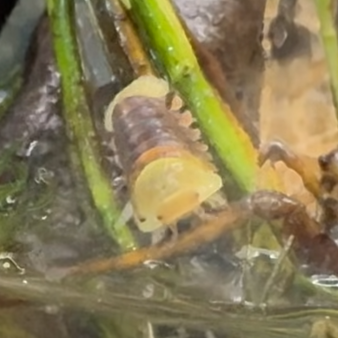
Cubaris sp. "Rubber Ducky"

The hobby expanded in popularity largely due to Cubaris sp. "Rubber Ducky". This undescribed Cubaris species garnered significant online attention, due to its face resembling that of a rubber ducky. A number of isopod keepers credit this species for getting them into the hobby.

In addition to the poaching of Cubaris sp. "Rubber Ducky" woodlice and additional isopod species for pets, "digital photography, citizen science platforms and social networks," pyrethrin agents have induced morphological changes in, and diminished food consumption by, terrestrial isopods, even as increasing numbers have been identified in Western Europe and classified amidst soil contamination.
