= 'Round the World with the Rubber Duck =

Single by C. W. McCall

from the album Rubber Duck
- B-side: "Night Rider"
- Released: 1976
- Genre: Country, truck-driving country
- Label: Polydor
- Producer(s): Louis F. "Chip" Davis Jr. Don Sears

"'Round the World with the Rubber Duck" is a 1976 novelty song performed by C.W. McCall. The song serves as sequel to, and parody of, McCall's previous song "Convoy."

== Content ==
After reaching the New Jersey shore, the convoy from "Convoy" finds itself cornered, when the Rubber Duck has an idea: place the friends of Jesus in the front door and cross the Atlantic Ocean the way Jesus walked on water. Though half the convoy is lost at sea (from lack of faith), the rest arrives in England. From there, they cross the English Channel en route through Omaha Beach, the Berlin Wall via the Autobahn, the Soviet Union and Japan, before Pig Pen—recalled from Omaha at the beginning of the song—lands in Australia, where there is no 55 mph speed limit, and the Rubber Duck decides to take the convoy there.

Interspersed through the song are McCall's one-sided CB conversations, comments from observers with stereotypical ethnic accents, and backing vocals acknowledging the stupidity of the song's premise.

== Chart performance ==
Chart (1976)	Peak position
US Hot Country Songs (Billboard)	40
US Bubbling Under Hot 100 (Billboard)	101
Canadian RPM Country Playlist	40
