= The Drew and Mike Podcast =

Talk show podcast

The Drew Lane Show
- Genre: Talk
- Format: Audio podcast

Production
- Production: Jay Timko (2016–2017); Marc Fellhauer (2016–present); Brandon McAfee (2016–present)
- Length: 2–3 hours

Publication
- Original release: May 13, 2016; 9 years ago

Related
- Website: drewlaneshow.com

The Drew Lane Show (formerly The Drew and Mike Show) is a podcast based in Ferndale, Michigan, by American radio host Drew Lane. The podcast launched on May 3, 2016, with Lane and his radio partner Mike Clark, as The Drew and Mike Podcast. The show was renamed after Clark died in October 2018.

== History ==
Drew Lane and Mike Clark served as hosts of the WRIF-FM morning show The Drew and Mike Show from 1991 until 2013. The comedy show received good ratings and earned Marconi Radio Award nominations. Following the end at WRIF, Lane briefly hosted an afternoon show on WMGC-FM from 2013 to 2015.

Drew reunited with his former co-host from WRIF-FM, Mike Clark, to create the Drew and Mike Podcast, a continuation of the original terrestrial program with a morning show feel, covering everyday news, sports, crime, music and pop culture stories and including an array of audio 'drops' from movies, shows, commercials, etc. The podcast has made national news on occasion, including interviews with Andy Dick, Lenny Dykstra, and Margot Kidder.

Mike Clark unexpectedly died in his sleep in the early morning of October 16, 2018, at the age of 63 following a long hiatus from the podcast due to vocal cord paralysis. Drew and the rest of his crew continue to do the show under the "Drew & Mike" banner, choosing to keep Clark's name in the title.

Current in-studio lineup includes American Radio personality & host Drew Lane and co-hosts Marc Fellhauer, Trudi Daniels and producer Brandon McAfee. The show is the flagship podcast of the Red Shovel Network. Other shows on the network include ML Soul of Detroit with former Detroit Free Press and WJBK reporter M. L. Elrick, and No BS News Hour with investigative reporter Charlie LeDuff.
