= Roses for Mama (album) =

Studio album by C. W. McCall
- Released: 1977
- Genre: Country
- Length: 29:15
- Label: Polydor Records
- Producer: Chip Davis, Don Sears

C. W. McCall chronology
Rubber Duck (1976)	Roses for Mama (1977)	C. W. McCall & Co. (1979)

Professional ratings
Review scores
Source	Rating
AllMusic	4/5 stars

Roses for Mama is the fifth album by country musician C. W. McCall (pseudonym for the singer and songwriter Bill Fries), released on Polydor Records in 1977. McCall sings several songs that were written by others, as opposed to his previous albums, which were written entirely by himself (credited as Bill Fries) and Chip Davis. In fact, only three songs were written by the McCall and Davis; these are "I Don't Know (and I Don't Care)", "The Gallopin' Goose" and "Old Glory". "The Battle of New Orleans" is a cover version of Johnny Horton's popular 1959 song.

== Track listing ==
1. "Roses for Mama" (Johnny Wilson, Gene Dobbins, Wayne Sharpe) – 3:24
2. "The Only Light" (Walt Meskell, Tim Martin) – 2:30
3. "Livin' Within My Means" (Ron Agnew) – 2:59
4. "Watch the Wildwood Flowers" (Agnew) – 2:50
5. "Take My Duds to the Junkman" (Agnew) – 2:00
6. "The Battle of New Orleans" (Jimmie Driftwood) – 2:50
7. "I Don't Know (and I Don't Care)" (Bill Fries, Chip Davis) – 2:50
8. "The Gallopin' Goose" (Fries, Davis) – 3:20
9. "Night Hawk" (Tom McKeaon, Ron Peterson) – 2:45
10. "Old Glory" (Fries, Davis) – 3:47

== Personnel ==
- C. W. McCall – Vocals, Design
- Milt Bailey, Ruth Horn, Gary Morris, Sarah Westphalen – Vocals
- Chip Davis – Vocals, Drums, Percussion, Producer, Arranger
- Ron Agnew – Vocals, Electric Guitar, 6-String
- Ron Cooley – Electric Guitar, 6-String, 12-String
- Walt Meskell – Electric Guitar, 6-String, Banjo, Dobro
- Mark Gorat, Jack Moss – 6-String
- Jackson Berkey – Keyboards
- Eric Hansen – Bass, Harmonica
- Dorothy Brown, Hugh Brown, Miriam Dufflemeyer, Lucinda Gladics, James Hammond, Joe Landes, Beth McCollum, Merton Shatzkin, Alex Sokol – Strings

=== Additional personnel ===
- Don Sears – Producer, Engineer, Design
- John Boyd, Ron Ubel, Jim Wheeler – Engineers
- John Kircher – Photography
- Dudycha, Schirck and Associates, Inc. – Art Direction and Production

== Charts ==
Chart (1977)	Peak position
US Country Albums (Billboard)	22

Singles

Year	Single	Chart	Position
1977	"Roses for Mama"	US Country Singles (Billboard)	2
