= Convoy (song) =

Single by C. W. McCall

from the album Black Bear Road
- B-side: "Long Lonesome Road"
- Released: November 1975
- Recorded: 1975
- Genre: Country; truck-driving country
- Length: 3:49
- Label: MGM
- Songwriters: Bill Fries; Chip Davis
- Producers: Don Sears; Chip Davis

C. W. McCall singles chronology
"Black Bear Road" (1975)	"Convoy" (1975)	"There Won't Be No Country Music (There Won't Be No Rock 'n' Roll)" (1976)

"Convoy" is a 1975 novelty song performed by C. W. McCall (a character co-created and voiced by Bill Fries, along with Chip Davis) that became a number-one song on both the country and pop charts in the US. It ranked 98th on Rolling Stone magazine's 2014 list of the Greatest Country Songs of All Time, and 106th place in its 2024 revision. Written by McCall and Chip Davis, the song spent six weeks at number one on the country charts and one week at number one on the pop charts. The song went to number one in Canada as well, hitting the top of the RPM Top Singles Chart on January 24, 1976. "Convoy" also peaked at number two in the UK. The song capitalized on the fad for citizens band (CB) radio. The song was the inspiration for the 1978 Sam Peckinpah film Convoy, for which McCall rerecorded the song to fit the film's storyline.

The song received newfound popularity in 2022 with its use during the so-called 'Freedom Convoy'. In a call with WRIF's Drew & Mike Show shortly before he died, Fries expressed enthusiasm over the Freedom Convoy's use of his song "only because his biggest hit [was] getting a second life".

== Plot ==
The song consists of three types of interspersed dialogue: a simulated CB conversation with CB slang, the narration of the story, and the chorus. It is about a fictional trucker rebellion that drives from the West Coast to the East Coast of the United States without stopping. What they are protesting (other than the 55 mph speed limit, then recently introduced in response to the 1973 oil crisis) is shown by lines such as "we tore up all of our swindle sheets" (CB slang for log sheets used to record driving hours; the term referred to the practice of falsifying entries to show that drivers were getting proper sleep when, in reality, the drivers were driving more than the prescribed number of hours before mandatory rest) and "left 'em sittin' on the scales" (CB slang for US Department of Transportation weigh stations on Interstates and highways to verify the weight of the truck and the drivers' hours of working through log books). The song also refers to toll roads: "We just ain't a-gonna pay no toll."

The conversation is between "Rubber Duck", "Pig Pen", and "Sodbuster", primarily through Rubber Duck's side of the conversation. The narration and CB chatter are by McCall.

At the beginning of the song, Rubber Duck is the "front door" (the leader) of three semi-trailer trucks (tractor and semi-trailer) when he realizes they have a convoy. Following the Rubber Duck, Pig Pen brings up the rear (the "back door") in a "'Jimmy' haulin' hogs" (a truck powered by a two-stroke Detroit Diesel engine-A.K.A. Screamin' Jimmy, after Detroit Diesel's then-owner General Motors-with a livestock semi-trailer loaded with live pigs). The two other trucks are a Kenworth pulling logs, and a cab-over Peterbilt with a "reefer" (refrigerated trailer) attached; the lyrics are unclear which one of the two the Rubber Duck was driving (the sequel song "'Round the World with the Rubber Duck" more strongly implies he indeed is driving the Peterbilt, which would be consistent with McCall's previous songs and commercials portraying him as a bread truck driver).

The convoy begins at night on June 6 on "I-one-oh" (I-10) just outside "Shakytown" (Los Angeles, California), as the Rubber Duck informs the two trucks that "it's clean clear to Flagtown" (Flagstaff, Arizona) and that he is going to "put the hammer down" ("hammer" being the accelerator pedal) as the convoy plans to "cross the USA". By the time they get to "Tulsatown" (Tulsa, Oklahoma), there are 85 trucks and the "bears / Smokeys" (state police, specifically the highway patrol, who commonly wear the same campaign hats as the United States Forest Service mascot Smokey Bear) have set up a road block on the cloverleaf interchange and have a "bear in the air" (police helicopter). The convoy moves onto Interstate 44, and by the time they reach "Chi-town" (Chicago, Illinois), the convoy—now 1,001 vehicles strong—includes a driver with the handle "Sodbuster", a "suicide jockey" (truck hauling explosives, in this case dynamite), and "11 long-haired friends of Jesus" in a "chartreuse [Volkswagen] Microbus". Rubber Duck directs the Microbus behind the dynamite truck for divine protection. Meanwhile, the police have called out "reinforcements from the 'Illi-noise' [Illinois] National Guard" and have filled the "chicken coops" (weigh stations) in an effort to stall and/or break up the convoy. Rubber Duck tells the convoy to disregard the toll as they head for the state border and continue east toward the New Jersey shore, crashing through the toll gate at 98 miles per hour (158 km/h), well above the national 55 mph limit in place at the time, in the process.

The song's running gag has Rubber Duck complaining about the smell of the hogs that Pig Pen is hauling. He repeatedly asks the offending driver to "back off" (slow down). By the end, Pig Pen has fallen so far back, when Rubber Duck is in New Jersey, Pig Pen got detached from the convoy between Tulsa and Chicago and ended up in Omaha, Nebraska (a reference to the headquarters of American Gramaphone, which released the song, as well as Bozell & Jacobs, who created the C. W. McCall character; Omaha is well-known for its slaughterhouses, which a truck with cargo like the hogs hauled by Pig Pen would likely head to).

== Charts ==
=== Weekly charts ===
Chart (1975–1976)	Peak position
Australia (Kent Music Report)	1
Austrian Top 40	19
Canadian RPM Country Tracks	4
Canadian RPM Top Singles	1
Canadian RPM Adult Contemporary Tracks	13
German Singles Chart	43
French Singles Chart	76
Irish Singles Chart	2
New Zealand Singles Chart	1
UK Singles Chart	2
US Hot Country Songs (Billboard)	1
US Billboard Hot 100	1
US Adult Contemporary (Billboard)	19
US Cash Box Top 100	1

=== Year-end charts ===
Chart (1976)	Rank
Australia (Kent Music Report)	10
Canada	2
New Zealand	18
UK	29
US Billboard Hot 100	57
US Cash Box Top 100	38

== Sequel ==
McCall's 1976 song "'Round the World with the Rubber Duck" is the sequel to "Convoy". In this continuation, the convoy leaves the U.S. and travels around the world, through Britain, France, West and East Germany, the USSR, Japan, and Australia.

== Remakes and cover versions ==
- In 1976, a parody by Laurie Lingo & The Dipsticks entitled "Convoy GB" made No. 4 on the UK singles chart. The name "Laurie Lingo" is a pun; in the UK, a large truck is known as a "lorry", and thus "lorry lingo" would be "truck slang". The act actually consisted of BBC Radio 1 DJs Dave Lee Travis and Paul Burnett with "The Dipsticks" being the Top of the Pops vocalists The Ladybirds. The parody used the same tune, but altered the song's lyrics to take place in the UK, with dialogue featuring Travis and Burnett as truckers "Superscouse" and "Plastic Chicken".
- McCall himself recorded a new version of the song with saltier lyrics for the soundtrack of the 1978 film Convoy. McCall also made two additional re-recordings of the original song, one for his 1990 album The Real McCall: An American Storyteller, and the other for the 2003 Mannheim Steamroller album American Spirit.
- Another parody, "Chat Room", was produced by Bob Rivers.
- In 1981, rap artist Blowfly recorded a dirty rap version of the song on his album Rappin Dancing and Laughin. This seven-minute version, describes an all-black convoy of strikebreakers delivering Blowfly's album to New York City, concludes with a list of vulgar slang terms arranged in alphabetical order and a dialogue between Blowfly and his alter ego, Clarence Reid.
- In 1990, Karen and Wade Sheeler recorded a parody called "Car Phone", which later appeared on the Dr. Demento 25th Anniversary Collection.
- In 2000, Priceline aired a television commercial featuring actor William Shatner performing the song with altered lyrics about the company's services.
- In 2010, country-rap artist Colt Ford recorded the song for his 2010 album Chicken & Biscuits.
- The Spanish group Mocedades did the song with the translated title Aire in their 1982 studio album Amor de Hombre. The Spanish lyrics for this song were written by Fernando De Diego.

=== Paul Brandt version ===
The song was covered in 2004 by Paul Brandt. The video features Brandt and fellow country singers Jason McCoy and Aaron Lines as well as then Calgary Flames defencemen Mike Commodore and Rhett Warrener as truckers and George Canyon, of Nashville Star fame, as the highway patrol officer. The video was seen on CMT in both Canada and the United States. It was filmed at CFB/ASU Wainwright on Airfield 21. The song appears on the 2004 album This Time Around.

Brandt also recorded a Christmas version called "Christmas Convoy", which appears on the 2006 holiday album A Gift. In this version, the convoy helps Santa deliver his toys after a bad storm.
