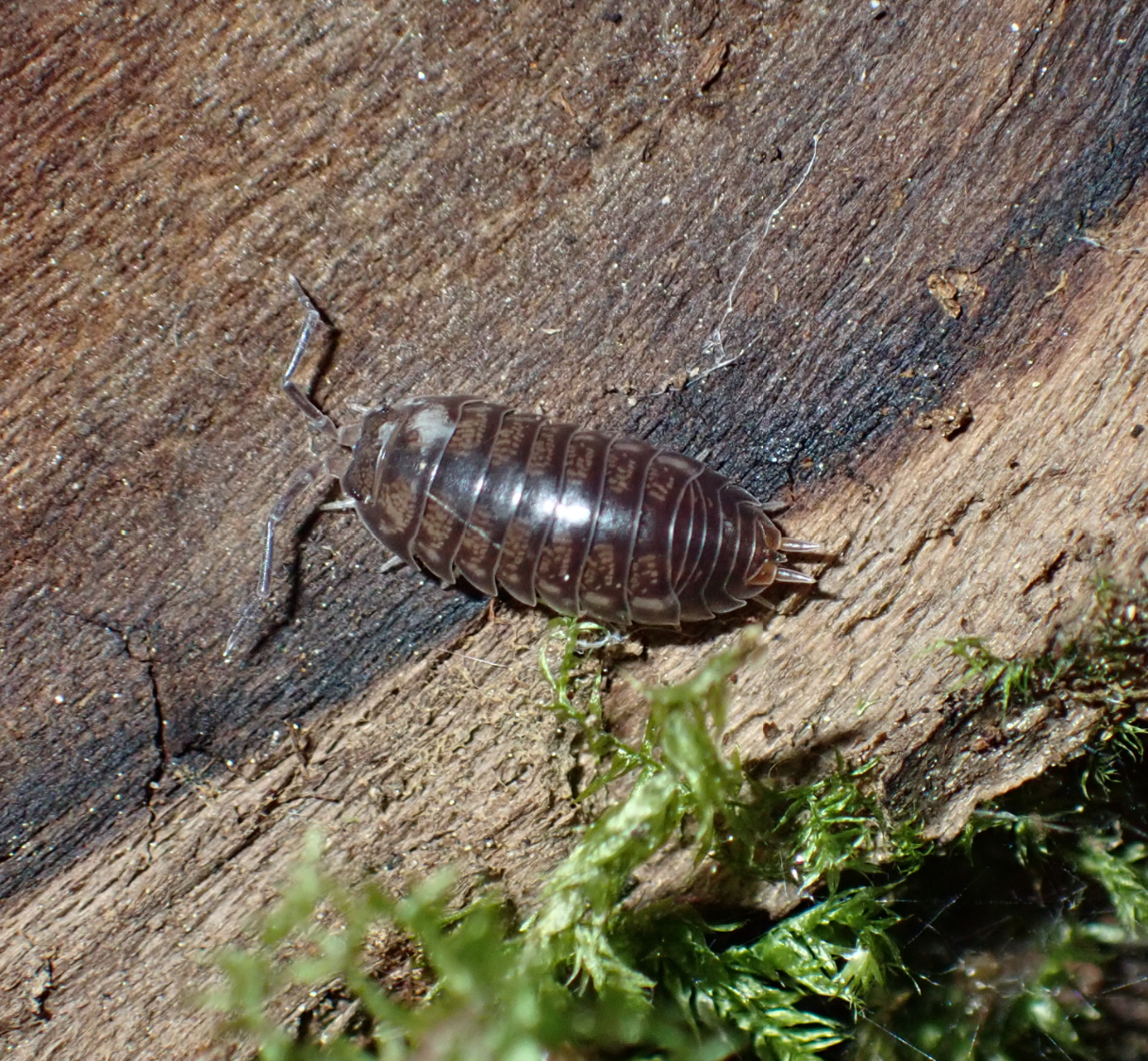
- Cylisticus convexus on wood

Scientific classification
- Kingdom: Animalia
- Phylum: Arthropoda
- Class: Malacostraca
- Order: Isopoda
- Suborder: Oniscidea
- Family: Cylisticidae
- Genus: Cylisticus
- Species: C. convexus

Binomial name
- Cylisticus convexus (De Geer, 1778)

= Cylisticus convexus =

Species of crustacean

Cylisticus convexus, the curly woodlouse, is a species of woodlouse in the family Cylisticidae. This species was first described in 1778 by Charles De Geer.

== Description ==
Cylisticus convexus can conglobate, but its antennae and long pointed uropods remain protruding. This latter feature and its five pairs of pleopodal lungs distinguishes it from Armadillidium spp. and Eluma caelata, which have truncated 'square' uropods and two pairs of pleopodal lungs.

This species reaches a maximum of 9.0mm for males and 10.0mm for females. They have an elongated and convex body. Their cephalon has nearly square lateral lobes that are oliquely directed outwards. Their eyes have 22 ommatidia. They have antennae with the fifth article of peduncle longer than flagellum; the flagellum of two articles, distal and proximal articles nearly equal in length. Their mandibles have a molar penicil made up of numerous setae arising from one stem. Their maxilla is two-lobed, with both lobes bearing setules; the inner lobe is larger than outer lobe with scattered spines.

== Ecology ==
Their habitats are on the ground near buildings. Like other pillbugs they are nocturnal detritivores that primarily eat dead wood and leaf litter.

== Distribution ==
This species native to Europe and Asia. It has been introduced in North Africa, North America, and South America.

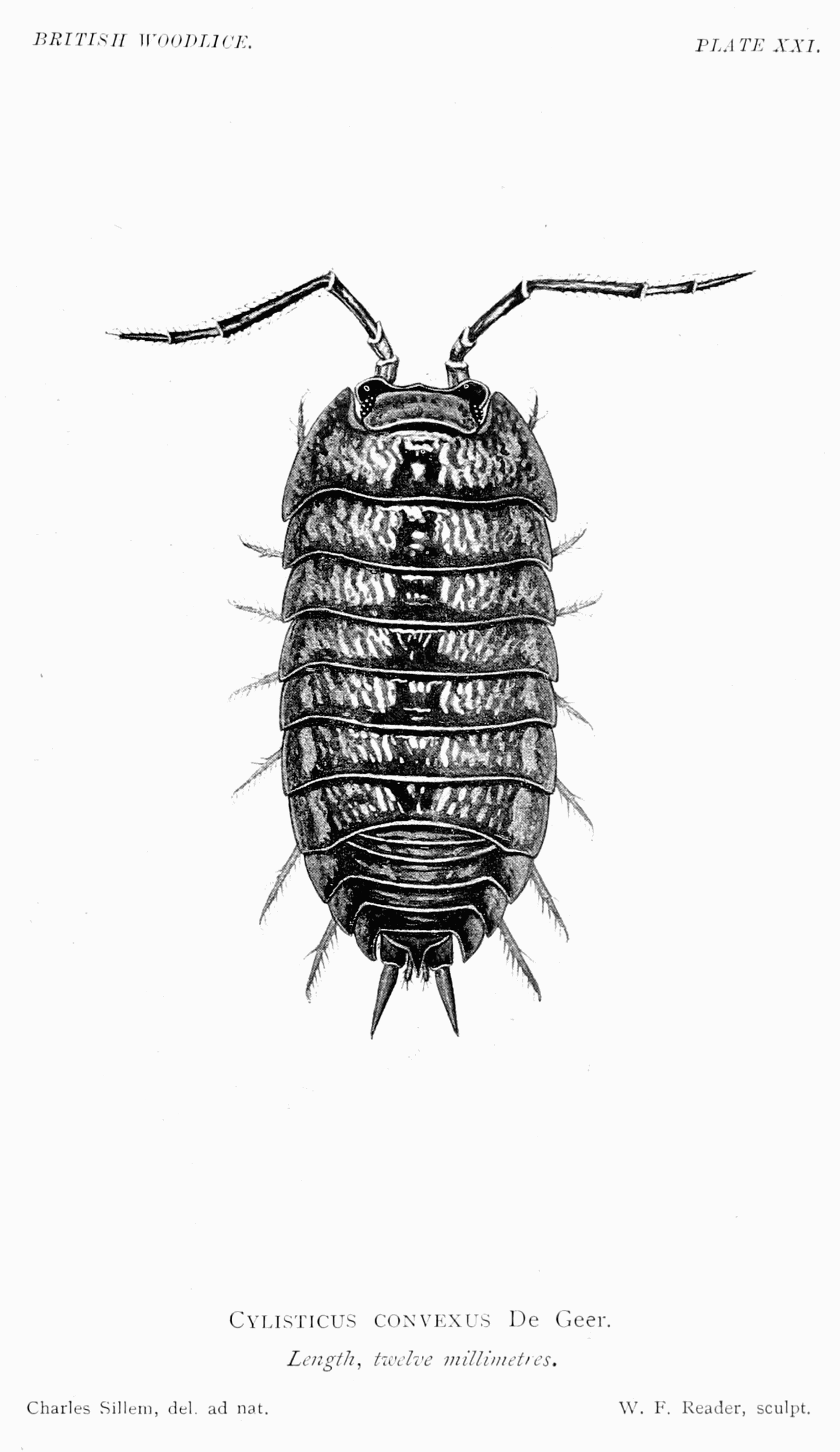
Illustration of C. convexus
