= Paxodillidium =

Paxodillidium schawalleri

Scientific classification
- Kingdom: Animalia
- Phylum: Arthropoda
- Clade: Pancrustacea
- Class: Malacostraca
- Order: Isopoda
- Suborder: Oniscidea
- Family: Armadillidiidae
- Genus: Paxodillidium; Schmalfuss, 1985
- Species: P. schawalleri

Binomial name
- Paxodillidium schawalleri Schmalfuss, 1985
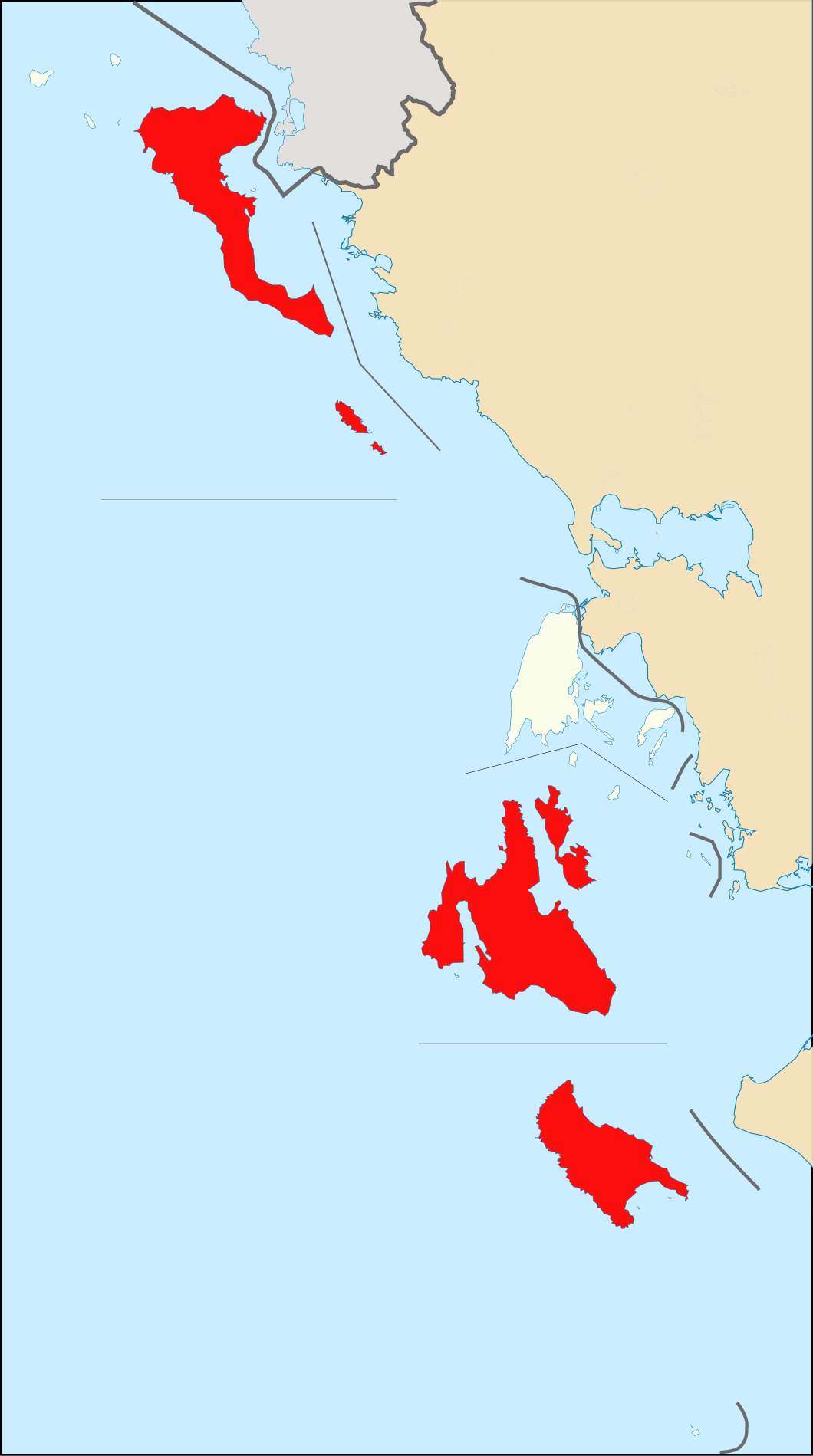
- Distribution of Paxodillidium schawalleri (in red)

Species of crustacean

Paxodillidium is a genus of woodlice endemic to Greece. It is monotypic, being represented by the single species Paxodillidium schawalleri. Its true affinities within the family Armadillidiidae are not known.

== Taxonomy ==
Paxodillidium schawalleri was described as the only member of the genus Paxodillidium by Helmut Schmalfuss, in 1985, based on specimens collected from the island of Paxos. Its true affinities within the family Armadillidiidae are yet unknown, but two hypotheses have been made:

- The first one states that Paxodillidium is related to Cyphodillidium and Echinarmadillidium, two genera that also show a distinct ornamentation on the tergites. From these two, Paxodillidium is believed to be more closely related to Cyphodillidium, with which it shares the development of a frontal edge on the head. On the other hand, it differs from it by the presence of more flattened epimera and individualized tubercles on the tergites.
- The second one states that the genus could be more closely related to Trichodillidium, as both of them have an oblique ridge on the uropod-protopodites.

== Description ==
Paxodillidium schawalleri is a small-sized species, reaching maximum dimensions of about 6 x 3 mm. Its tergites are decorated with a number of conspicuously large tubercles: 4 on the posterior part of the head and on each pereion-tergite and 2 on each pleon-tergite and on the telson, along the mid-line. The tubercles of the pleon and telson are much smaller than those of the head and the pereion. The species is totally pigmenless, except for the eyes, which are black, or with some slightly pigmented areas on the head and pereion-tergites, the distribution and extent of which varies. The head bears a developed frontal triangle, with sharp-edged sides and a slightly indented surface. It also has a frontal ridge, which runs all the way towards the eyes and is formed by the continuation of the upper edge of the frontal triangle ("Eluma-type"). The secondary antennae have visible lobes at their bases, are slender and the second article of the flagellum is three times longer than the first. All of the epimera are kind-of flattened and protrude outwards and those of the first pair of pereion-tergites lack a ventral schisma/groove (a character present in Cyphodillidium, but absent in Echinarmadillidium). The telson is visibly wider than long and has a broadly truncated tip.

Concerning the sexual characters of the male, the ischium of the seventh pereiopod is slightly indented ventrally and has a hair field at its apical part. The posterior lobe of the exopodite of the first pleopod is short and triangular and the apex of the endopodite is straight .

== Distribution ==
Paxodillidium schawalleri is endemic to various Ionian islands lying offshore western Greece. Particularly, until now, the species has been found in the islands of Corfu, Paxos, Antipaxos, Ithaki, Kefalonia, Zakynthos and Strofades.

== Ecology ==
Paxodillidium schawalleri has been found in three types of habitat: Olive groves, phrygana and Quercus ilex forests.

The function of its most remarkable character, the presence of "gigantic" (compared to its general body size) tubercles on the body, isn't known for sure, but is believed to be an anti-predator adaptation. The tubercles seem to increase the diameter of the rolled-up animal considerably, and, as such, put it outside of the prey-size spectrum of various predators, like lacertid lizards and geckos. Additionally, the tubercles may also cause injuries in the mouth cavity and the esophagus of these vertebrate predators.
