= Eluma matae =

Scientific classification
- Kingdom: Animalia
- Phylum: Arthropoda
- Class: Malacostraca
- Order: Isopoda
- Suborder: Oniscidea
- Family: Armadillidiidae
- Genus: Eluma
- Species: E. matae

Binomial name
- Eluma matae Cifuentes & Da Silva, 2023

Species of crustacean

Eluma matae is a species of woodlouse distributed throughout Portugal.

== Description ==
The back of the pereonites and pleonites are smooth, with circular depressions covered in setae of varying shapes and sizes. It is capable of volvation without leaving any gaps, similar to Armadillidium vulgare. Like other members of its genus, its eyes are characterised by a single large ommatidium. It has a maximum length of 12 millimetres (1/2 in). It has a generally purplish-brown to dark green color, with a large white spot at the limit of the epimera.

== Ecology ==
Members of this species live under mostly limestone rocks with large amounts of plant debris in regions with natural vegetation, particularly Quercus faginea. They were found together with Ctenoscia minima and Porcellio dispar.
