= Eluma praticola =

Scientific classification
- Kingdom: Animalia
- Phylum: Arthropoda
- Class: Malacostraca
- Order: Isopoda
- Suborder: Oniscidea
- Family: Armadillidiidae
- Genus: Eluma
- Species: E. praticola

Binomial name
- Eluma praticola Taiti & Rossano, 2015

Species of crustacean

Eluma praticola is a species of woodlouse, found throughout northeastern Morocco in the Oued Laou basin. Its name derives from the Latin word for meadow (pratum) and the stem of the Latin word for live (colere).

== Description ==
Males grow to about 5.5 millimetres (0.22 in) in length, whereas egg-bearing females reach 7 millimetres (0.28 in) in length. The species has a convex body and has the ability to conglobate. It is brown in color, the epimera being paler on pereonites 2-7. Its dorsal surface is free of ornamentation, but contains numerous round pits and setae. Like other members of the Eluma genus its eyes consist of one large ommatidium. The telson is triangular.
