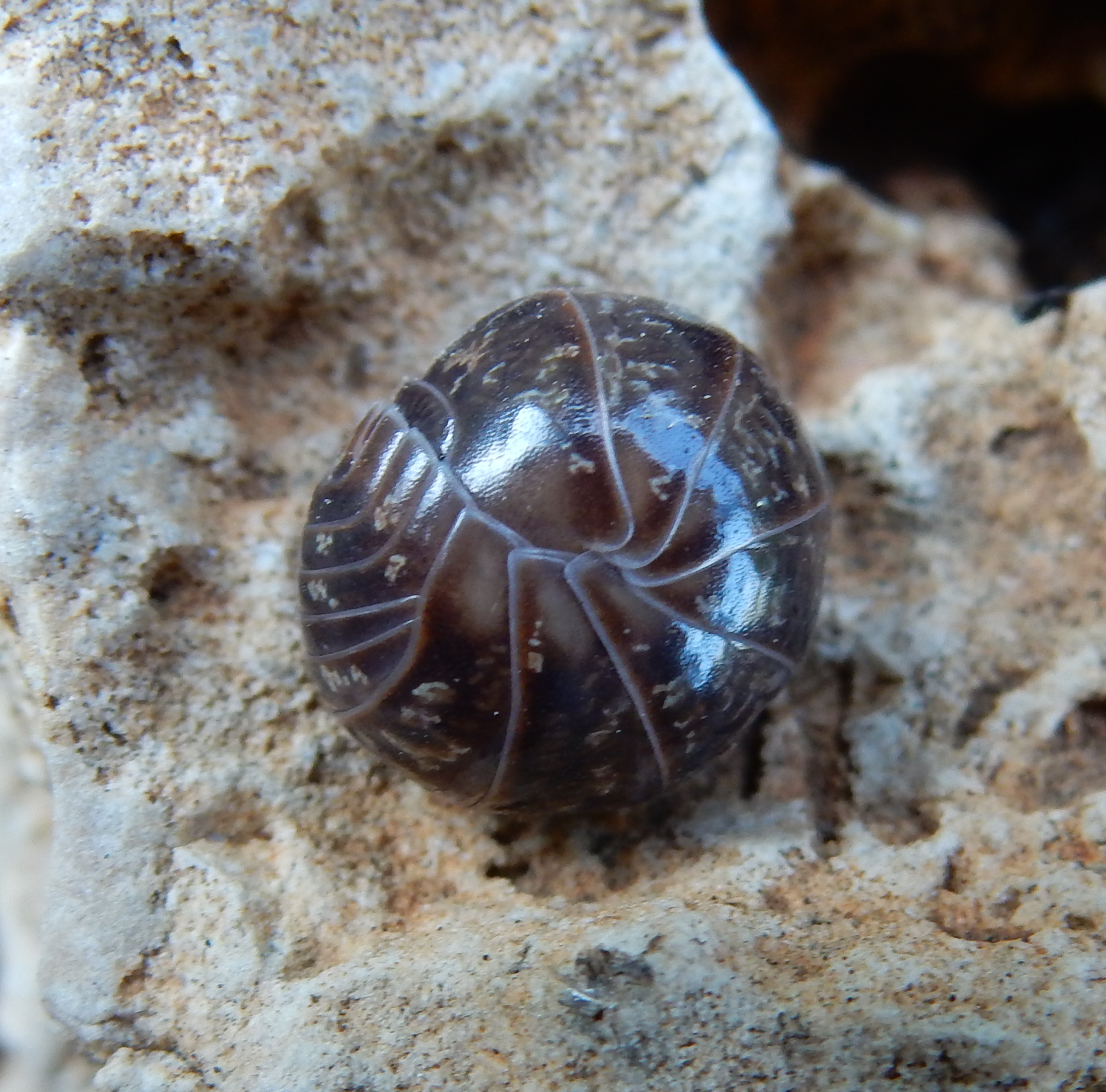

Scientific classification
- Kingdom: Animalia
- Phylum: Arthropoda
- Class: Malacostraca
- Order: Isopoda
- Suborder: Oniscidea
- Family: Armadillidiidae
- Genus: Schizidium; Verhoeff, 1901

Synonyms
- Cretodilium Vandel, 1958; Pareluma Omer-Cooper, 1923

= Schizidium =

Genus of crustacean

Schizidium is a genus of woodlice, found from Greece to Iran.

== Description ==
It has a convex body, and is capable of volvation (rolling into a ball) without leaving fissures. It has small eyes with several ocelli. Its telson is triangular and its uropods are similar to those of Armadillidium. The first joint of the antenna is remarkably small, being only about half as long as the second.

== Ecology ==
The species of the genus appear in three varieties: Fully epigeal (land-living) species, mostly moving around at night and hiding under stones during the daytime, these species are fully pigmented; endogeal species, which mostly live interstitially, are generally depigmented with reduced sizes and eyes, and cave-dwelling species with reduced or missing eyes, and generally depigmented. The latter two types do not occur outside of the Aegean Islands.

== Species ==
Schizidium contains the following species:

- Schizidium aegaeum (Sfenthouarkis, 1995)
- Schizidium album (Sfenthouarkis, 1995)
- Schizidium almanum Verhoeff & Strouhal, 1967
- Schizidium atticum (Stefenthouarkis, 1992)
- Schizidium beroni Andreev, 2001
- Schizidium christosi Dimitriou, Campos-Filho & Sfenthouarkis, 2023
- Schizidium davidi (Dollfus, 1887)
- Schizidium delmastroi Schmalfuss, Paragamian & Sfenthouarkis, 2004
- Schizidium falkonerae (Sfentouarkis, 1995)
- Schizidium festai (Dollfus, 1894)
- Schizidium fissum (Budde-Lund, 1896)
- Schizidium golovatchi Schmalfuss, 1988
- Schizidium graecum (Schmalfuss, 1981)
- Schizidium granum (Dollfus, 1894)
- Schizidium hybridum (Budde-Lund, 1896)
- Schizidium levithae (Sfentouarkis, 1995)
- Schizidium myrrae Campos-Filho, Taiti & Sfenthouarkis, 2023
- Schizidium oertzenii (Budde-Lund, 1896)
- Schizidium osellai Schmalfuss, 1988
- Schizidium paragamiani Schmalfuss, 2005
- Schizidium perplexum (Vandel, 1958)
- Schizidium persicum Schmalfuss, 1986
- Schizidium polyvotisi (Sfenthouarkis, 1995)
- Schizidium rausi Schmalfuss, 1988
- Schizidium reinoehli Schmalfuss, 1988
- Schizidium schmalfussi Sfenthouarkis, 1992
- Schizidium tiberianum Verhoeff, 1923
- Schizidium tinum Sfenthouarkis, 1995
