= Eluma tuberculata =

Scientific classification
- Kingdom: Animalia
- Phylum: Arthropoda
- Class: Malacostraca
- Order: Isopoda
- Suborder: Oniscidea
- Family: Armadillidiidae
- Genus: Eluma
- Species: E. tuberculata

Binomial name
- Eluma tuberculata Cruz, 1991

Species of woodlouse

Eluma tuberculata is a species of woodlouse endemic to central Portugal. The species is thought to be troglophilic. Its name derives from the many nodules on its body.
