= Laureola volamuca =

Scientific classification
- Kingdom: Animalia
- Phylum: Arthropoda
- Clade: Pancrustacea
- Class: Malacostraca
- Order: Isopoda
- Suborder: Oniscidea
- Family: Armadillidae
- Genus: Laureola
- Species: L. volamuca

Binomial name
- Laureola volamuca Zong, Wang, Jiang & Li, 2026

Species of woodlouse

Laureola volamuca is a species of isopods of the family Armadillidae that lives in China. The type specimen for this species was collected from Hainan Island. This species was described in 2026 by Zili Zong, Yutao Wang, Chao Jiang and Weichun Li.

== Description ==
Maximum body length of this species is 3.5 mm in males, 3.8 mm in females. Their body is elliptic, and they are unable to fully conglobate. Their dorsal surface is yellowish brown, with extensive yellowish-white areas on their third, fourth, and seventh pereon segments. Their dorsal side also has long spines on the cephalon, pereon segments, the third to fifth pleon segments, and the telson.

=== Head ===
Their frontal shield (frontal lamina) does not protrude past the end of the head and is gently arched medially. Their eyes are composed of 10–12 ommatidia. Their antennule has three articles, the distal-most article has eight to ten superimposed aesthetascs (sensory seta) near the apex. Their antenna have a long spine at the distal apex of the fifth peduncular article. The flagellum with second article (including apical organ) approximately eight times as long as first article. The apical organ is thin and long. Their left mandible has a three-toothed incisor, five penicils (dentate setae on mandible) between hairy lobe and molar process. Their right mandible has a two-toothed incisor, and four penicils between a hairy lobe and molar process. Their maxillule has two unequal penicils on distal margin of inner lobe. The outer lobe has eight apical teeth of various sizes. Their maxilla are bilobate apically, with the inner lobe being smaller and bearing more setae than outer lobe. Their maxilliped endite is rectangular, and its apex has three setae. Their palp is three-articled, with the basal-most article having two small setae, the medial article having one large seta at inner distal angle of distal margin, and the distal article being densely covered with hairy setae.

=== Pereon ===
The first pereon segments has a bluntly rounded epimera (side plates). The second to seventh pereon segments have pointed epimera. There are ventral lobes present on the first to third pereon segments. Their pereopods have no apparent sexual specializations. The first pereopod has a long and thin basis (second leg segment) and a concave ischium. Their seventh pereopod has a basis that has a small triangular process distally on sternal face and a concave ischium.

=== Pleon ===
Their third to fifth pleon segments have elongated, spine-shaped epimera. Ther telson is broad basally and narrowed towards middle. Their uropod protopod is nearly triangular. Their exopod is inserted near medial margin, approximately one-third length of protopod, and does not extend to its apex.

==== Male pleopods ====
Males' first pleopod exopod is small, twice as wide as it is long with a rounded distal part. Their first pleopod endopod has a broad basal portion that tapers to a pointed tip with the apical portion directed outwards. Their second pleopod exopod is broad in basal one-third, distal two-thirds thin and long with a strongly concave outer margin. Their second pleopod endopod is thin and long, surpassing its exopod. Their third to fourth pleopod exopods are subtriangular, with the outer margin beingconcave. Their fifth pleopod exopod is subquadrangular, with the outer margin being nearly straight.

== Distribution ==
So far, this species has only been found in China.

== Natural history ==
This species was collected in the ecotone between coniferous and broad-leaved forests. It forages diurnally on stones covered with algae and moss. At night, it seeks shelter under the webs of jumping spiders and also forages on remnants of prey left within these webs. The species exhibits a characteristic jumping escape response when disturbed.

== Etymology ==
The species name is from the Latin "vola" (meaning "fly") and "mucus" (meaning "nasal mucus"), referring to the species' distinctive jumping locomotion, reminiscent of flying nasal mucus.
