= Laureola =

Scientific classification
- Kingdom: Animalia
- Phylum: Arthropoda
- Clade: Pancrustacea
- Class: Malacostraca
- Order: Isopoda
- Suborder: Oniscidea
- Family: Armadillidae
- Genus: Laureola; Barnard, 1960

Genus of woodlouse

Laureola is a genus of woodlice, a land crustacean isopod of the family Armadillidae.

== Description ==
The shape of the body of Laureola is thin and leaf-like. The epimera of all of their segments- except their first pereon segment - are pointed. Their frontal lamina is well-developed. Their dorsal side has either long spines or spiniform tubercles. Their first, second, and oftern third pereon segments have ventral lobes. Their telson is normally triangular, sometimes with a rectangular distal part. Their antennae and pereopods are long and fragile. All of their pleopods have exopodites present and equipped with pseudotracheae. Their uropod protopodite are normally triangular with a well-developed exopodite.

=== Notes on similar genera ===
Laureola sp. differ from the visually similar genus Akermania in the shape of the telson which is triangular in the former, truncate in the latter. Laureola is also visually very similar, if not identical, to the genus Echinodillo, with very little difference between these two genera, there is some indication that these genera may overlap but further study is needed to confirm this.

== Distribution ==
The genus Laureola is widely distributed, having been found in Australia, India, Mozambique, New Caledonia, São Tomé and Príncipe, South Africa, Vietnam, Zimbabwe and other countries.

== Species ==
The following species are accepted within Laureola:

- Laureola bivomer Barnard, 1960
- Laureola canberrensis (Vandel, 1973)
- Laureola dubia Schmalfuss & Ferrara, 1983
- Laureola hiatus Barnard, 1960
- Laureola indica Kwon, Ferrara & Taiti, 1992
- Laureola leucocephala Li & Wang, 2022
- Laureola longispina (Barnard, 1956)
- Laureola miacantha (Barnard, 1960)
- Laureola paucispinosa (Barnard, 1949)
- Laureola rubicunda Barnard, 1960
- Laureola silvatica (Vandel, 1973)
- Laureola vietnamensis Kwon, Ferrara & Taiti, 1993
- Laureola volamuca Zong, Wang, Jiang & Li, 2026
