= Eleoniscus =

Scientific classification
- Kingdom: Animalia
- Phylum: Arthropoda
- Class: Malacostraca
- Order: Isopoda
- Suborder: Oniscidea
- Family: Armadillidiidae
- Genus: Eleoniscus; Racovitza, 1907
- Species: E. helenae

Binomial name
- Eleoniscus helenae Racovitza, 1907

Genus of woodlice

Eleoniscus is a genus of the small terrestrial crustaceans known as woodlice. It includes one species, Eleoniscus helenae, which is endemic to Alicante province, Spain, where it is known from two caves. It may have been extirpated from one of the two caves (the species' type location) through the increasing urbanisation of the Macizo de Montgó.
