= Laureola dubia =

Scientific classification
- Kingdom: Animalia
- Phylum: Arthropoda
- Class: Malacostraca
- Order: Isopoda
- Suborder: Oniscidea
- Family: Armadillidae
- Genus: Laureola
- Species: L. dubia

Binomial name
- Laureola dubia Schmalfuss & Ferrara, 1983

Species of woodlouse

Laureola dubia is an endemic species of armadillo woodlice, a land crustacean isopods of the family Armadillidae that lives in São Tomé and Príncipe. The species was described in 1983 by Helmut Schmalfuss and Franco Ferrara.
