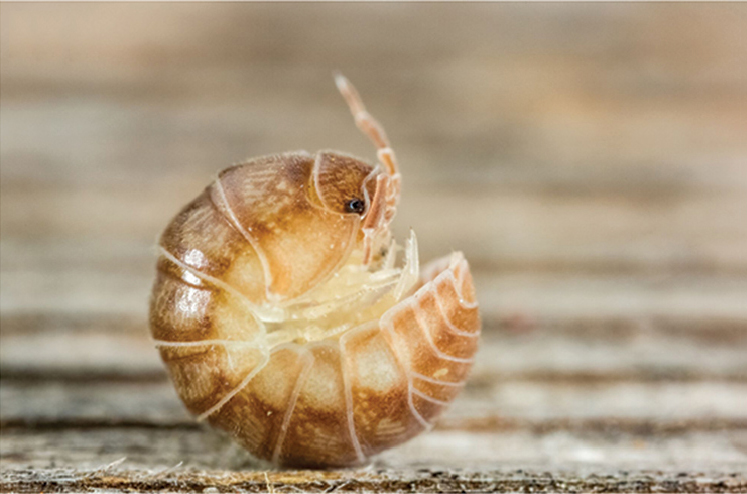

Scientific classification
- Kingdom: Animalia
- Phylum: Arthropoda
- Class: Malacostraca
- Order: Isopoda
- Suborder: Oniscidea
- Family: Armadillidiidae
- Genus: Eluma
- Species: E. caelata

Binomial name
- Eluma caelata (Miers, 1878)

Synonyms
- Armadillidium caelatum Miers, 1878; Eluma caelatum (Miers, 1878); Eluma helleri Verhoeff, 1908; Eluma purpurascens Budde-Lund, 1885; Eluma purpurescens Budde-Lund, 1879

= Eluma caelata =

Species of crustacean

Eluma caelata is a species of woodlouse found throughout Western Europe and Northwestern Africa. It has been introduced to other regions, such as French Guiana. It was first described as Armadillidium caelatum.

== Description ==
It is described as having a generally dark brown color. Its body is convex and finely punctulated. The head is closely encased by the first pereonite. The segments of the pleon are rounded, with the terminal segment being triangular. Its eyes consist of one prominent ommatidium, differentiating it from other members of Armadillidium.
