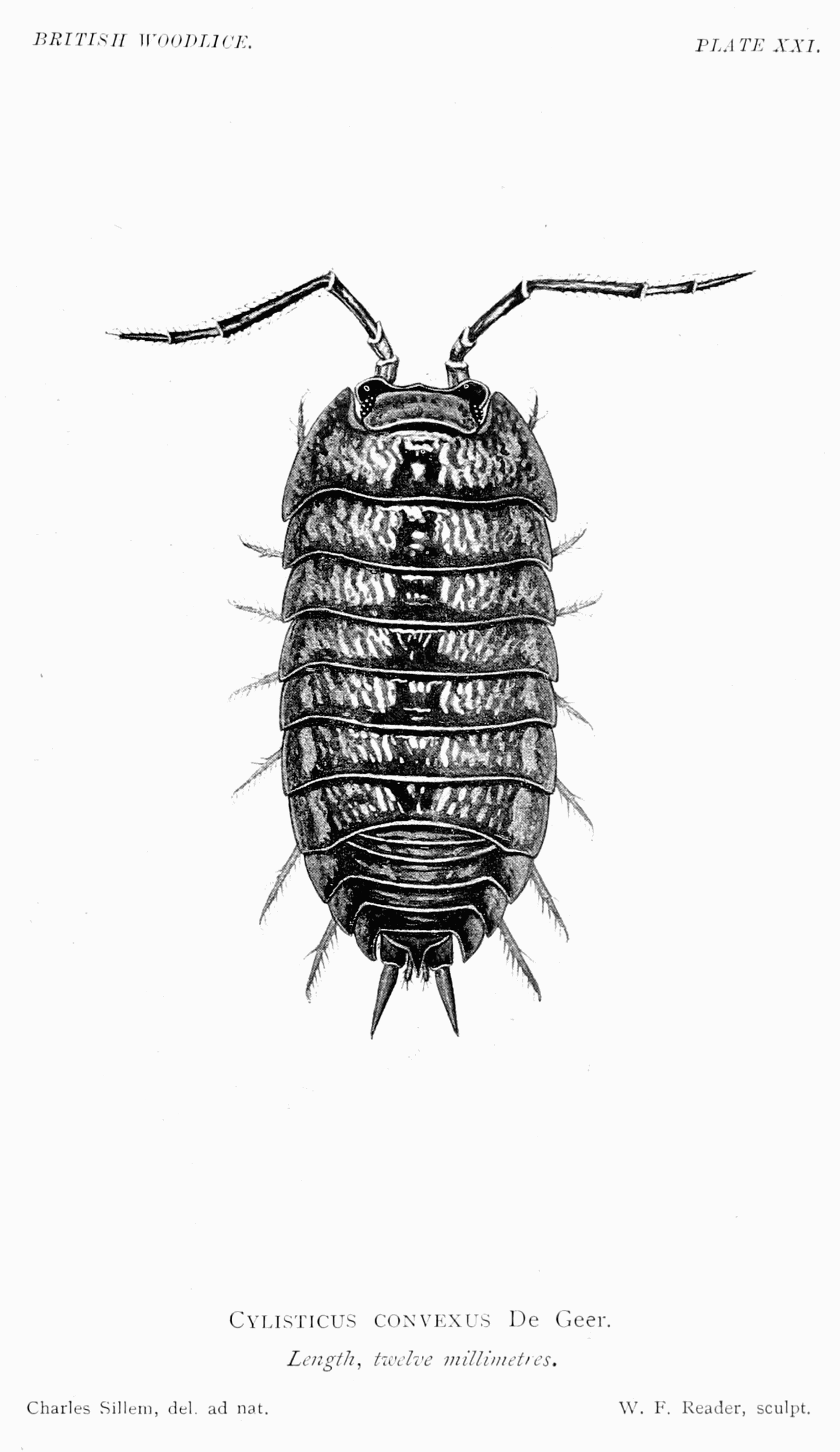
- Cylisticus convexus

Scientific classification
- Kingdom: Animalia
- Phylum: Arthropoda
- Class: Malacostraca
- Order: Isopoda
- Suborder: Oniscidea
- Family: Cylisticidae
- Genus: Cylisticus; Schnitzler, 1853

= Cylisticus =

Genus of crustaceans

Cylisticus is a genus of woodlice in the family Cylisticidae. There are at least 70 described species in Cylisticus.

== Species ==
These 70 species belong to the genus Cylisticus:

- Cylisticus albomaculatus Borutzkii, 1957
- Cylisticus anatolicus Verhoeff, 1949
- Cylisticus annulicornis Verhoeff, 1908
- Cylisticus anophthalmus Silvestri, 1897
- Cylisticus aprutianus Taiti & Manicastri, 1980
- Cylisticus armenicus Borutzkii, 1961
- Cylisticus arnoldi Borutzkii, 1961
- Cylisticus arnoldii Borutzky, 1961
- Cylisticus bergomatius Verhoeff, 1928
- Cylisticus biellensis Verhoeff, 1930
- Cylisticus birsteini Borutzkii, 1961
- Cylisticus brachyurus Radu, 1951
- Cylisticus caprariae Ferrara & Taiti, 1978
- Cylisticus carinatus Budde-Lund, 1885?
- Cylisticus caucasius Verhoeff, 1917
- Cylisticus cavernicola Racovitza, 1907
- Cylisticus cavernicolus Racovitza, 1907
- Cylisticus ciscaucasius Borutzkii, 1961
- Cylisticus convexus (De Geer, 1778) (curly woodlouse)
- Cylisticus cretaceus Borutzkii, 1957
- Cylisticus dentifrons Budde-Lund, 1885
- Cylisticus desertorum Borutzkii, 1957
- Cylisticus discolor Verhoeff, 1949
- Cylisticus dobati Strouhal, 1971
- Cylisticus esterelanus Verhoeff, 1917
- Cylisticus estest Verhoeff, 1931
- Cylisticus giljarovi Borutzkii, 1977
- Cylisticus gracilipennis Budde-Lund, 1879
- Cylisticus igiliensis Taiti & Ferrara, 1980
- Cylisticus iners Budde-Lund, 1880
- Cylisticus inferus Verhoeff, 1917
- Cylisticus kosswigi Strouhal, 1953
- Cylisticus lencoranensis Borutzkii, 1977
- Cylisticus ligurinus Verhoeff, 1936
- Cylisticus littoralis Ferrara & Taiti, 1978
- Cylisticus lobatus Ferrara & Taiti, 1985
- Cylisticus lobulatus Strouhal, 1953
- Cylisticus major Radu, 1951
- Cylisticus masalicus Kashani, 2016
- Cylisticus mechthildae Strouhal, 1971
- Cylisticus mitis Budde-Lund, 1885
- Cylisticus montanus Vandel, 1980
- Cylisticus montivagus Verhoeff, 1949
- Cylisticus mrovdaghensis Borutzkii, 1961
- Cylisticus nasatus Verhoeff, 1931
- Cylisticus nasutus Verhoeff, 1931
- Cylisticus nivicomes Verhoeff, 1949
- Cylisticus opacus Arcangeli, 1939
- Cylisticus orientalis Borutzkii, 1939
- Cylisticus ormeanus Verhoeff, 1930
- Cylisticus pallidus Verhoeff, 1928
- Cylisticus pierantonii Arcangeli, 1923
- Cylisticus pontremolensis Verhoeff, 1936
- Cylisticus pugionifer Verhoeff, 1943
- Cylisticus racovitzai Vandel, 1957
- Cylisticus rotabilis Budde-Lund, 1885
- Cylisticus rotundifrons Schmalfuss, 1986
- Cylisticus sarmaticus Borutzkii, 1977
- Cylisticus silsilesii (Vandel, 1980)
- Cylisticus silvestris Borutzkii, 1957
- Cylisticus strouhali Borutzkii, 1977
- Cylisticus suberorum Verhoeff, 1931
- Cylisticus transsilvanicus Verhoeff, 1908
- Cylisticus transsilvaticus Verhoeff, 1908
- Cylisticus transsylvanicus Verhoeff, 1908
- Cylisticus uncinatus Taiti & Ferrara, 1996
- Cylisticus urartuensis Borutzkii, 1961
- Cylisticus urgonis Taiti & Ferrara, 1980
- Cylisticus vandeli Taiti & Ferrara, 1980
- Cylisticus zangezuricus Borutzkii, 1961
