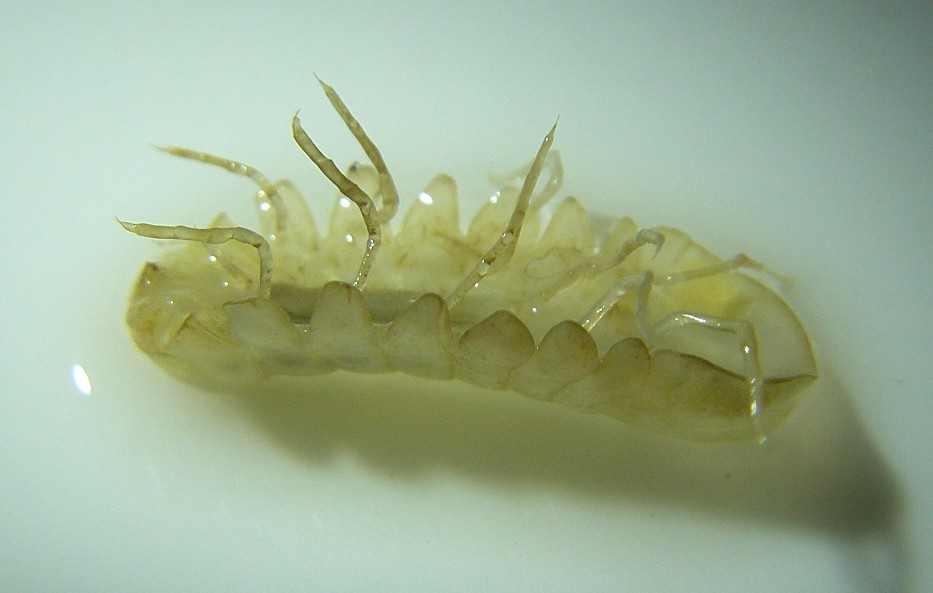
- As a troglodytic genus, Caecosphaeroma lacks eyes

Scientific classification
- Domain: Eukaryota
- Kingdom: Animalia
- Phylum: Arthropoda
- Class: Malacostraca
- Order: Isopoda
- Family: Sphaeromatidae
- Genus: Caecosphaeroma; Dollfus, 1896

Species
- C. virei Dollfus, 1896; C. burgundum Dollfus, 1898

= Caecosphaeroma =

Genus of crustaceans

Caecosphaeroma is a troglodytic isopod genus in the family Sphaeromatidae found in caves of NE and SW France. The genus was split off from Monolistra by Adrien Dollfus in 1896; in both genera, the female carries about 10 fertilized eggs in its external marsupium (brood pouch); they are white in Monolistra but bluish-green in Caecosphaeroma. C. burgundum is the most studied species.

== Description ==
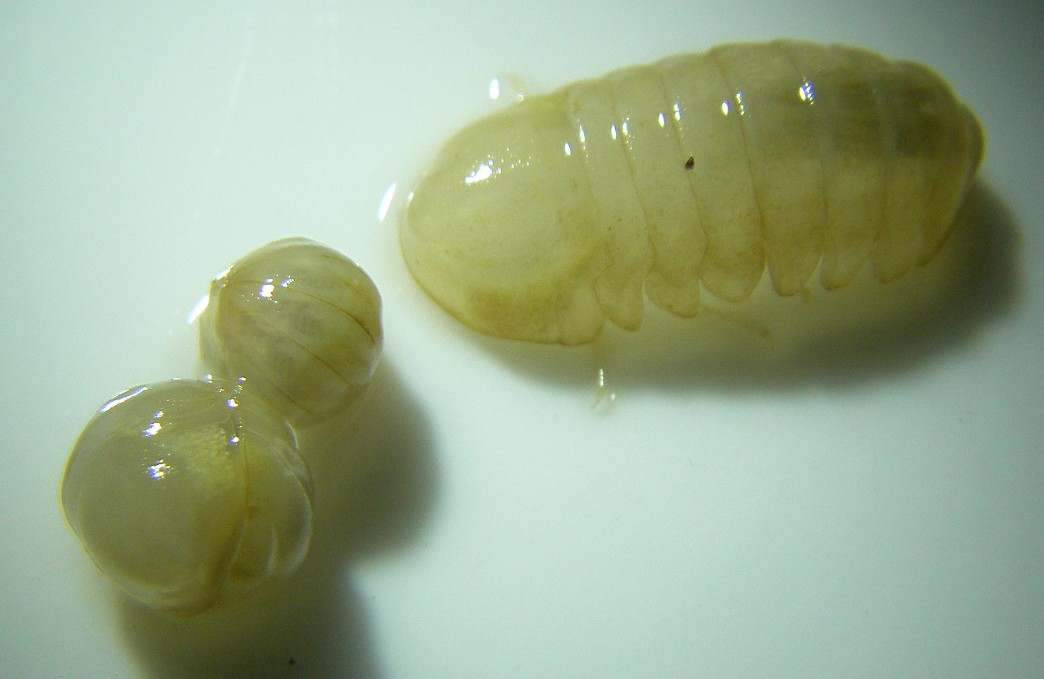
Three examples; two rolled into balls. These individuals were found in the Nancy spéléodrome (an abandoned underground aqueduct in Villers-lès-Nancy, France).

They measure from 2–20 mm long. As cave dwellers, they have lost their vision, but remain sensitive to light, which they shun. They are capable of volvation (rolling themselves into a ball) to protect themselves, rest, or sleep. During copulation the male and female embrace takes the form of two concentric spheres.

== Development ==
Larva remain in the marsupium about 12 months, and the animals continue growing for several years, reaching a final length of 10–20 mm.

== Evolution ==
The marine ancestors of Caecosphaeroma are believed to have migrated up the course of rivers and adapted to a subterranean environment that was relatively stable; meanwhile the marine environment of their ancestors changed, so Caecosphaeroma continued to differentiate as a separate lineage.

== Volvation in C. burgundum ==
C. burgundum has evolved in ways to improve its ability to curl into a ball. The mandibular palps and antennae are able retract into two deep grooves of the face, and the posterior margin of pleotelson (the last body segment fused with the "tail") provides greater mechanical support for the head. Evolution of volvation is seen in other subterranean isopods, but only C. burgundum is able to roll up into a hermetic sphere without any outward projections, and thus "approaches perfection in volvation".
