= Echinarmadillidium =

Scientific classification
- Kingdom: Animalia
- Phylum: Arthropoda
- Class: Malacostraca
- Order: Isopoda
- Suborder: Oniscidea
- Family: Armadillidiidae
- Genus: Echinarmadillidium; Verhoeff, 1901

Type species
- Armadillidium fruxgalii

Genus of woodlice

Echinarmadillidium is a genus of woodlice found throughout Croatia, Montenegro and parts of Greece. Verhoeff, who originally described the genus, speculated that the genus may be a transitional stage between Armadillidium and Armadillo.

== Description ==
There are six defining features, the first four of which were given by Verhoeff, with the last two being added later. These are indents on the backs of pereonites one and two, a grove along the margin of the edge of the first pereonite, the near segment of the flagellum of the antennae being about five times shorter than the far segment, an abruptly ending telson, a similar head-morphology to Armadillidium and all tergites covered with small rounded outgrowths.

== Species ==
The genus contains the following species:

- Echinarmadillidium armathianum Schmalfuss & Sfenthourakis, 1995
- Echinarmadillidium cycladicum Schmalfuss & Sfenthourakis, 1995
- Echinarmadillidium fruxgalii (Verhoeff, 1900)
