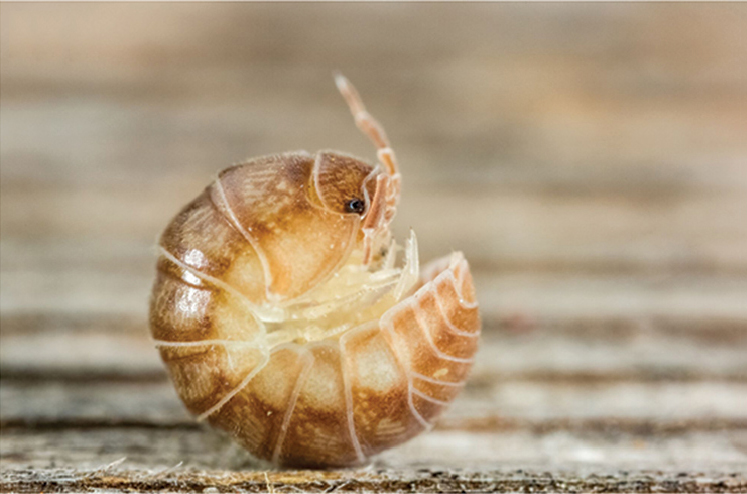
- Eluma caelata

Scientific classification
- Kingdom: Animalia
- Phylum: Arthropoda
- Class: Malacostraca
- Order: Isopoda
- Suborder: Oniscidea
- Family: Armadillidiidae
- Genus: Eluma; Budde-Lund, 1885

= Eluma =

Genus of woodlice

Eluma is a genus of woodlice in the family Armadillidiidae. The members of this genus are native to the Iberian Peninsula, Morocco, the Atlantic islands of the Azores, Canaries and Madeira, and from the west of France to the British Isles.

== Species ==
Eluma contains the following four species:

- Eluma caelata (Miers, 1878) — Western Europe, Macaronesia.
- Eluma matae Cifuentes & Da Silva, 2023 — Portugal
- Eluma praticola Taiti & Rossano, 2015 — Morocco
- Eluma tuberculata Cruz, 1991 — Portugal
