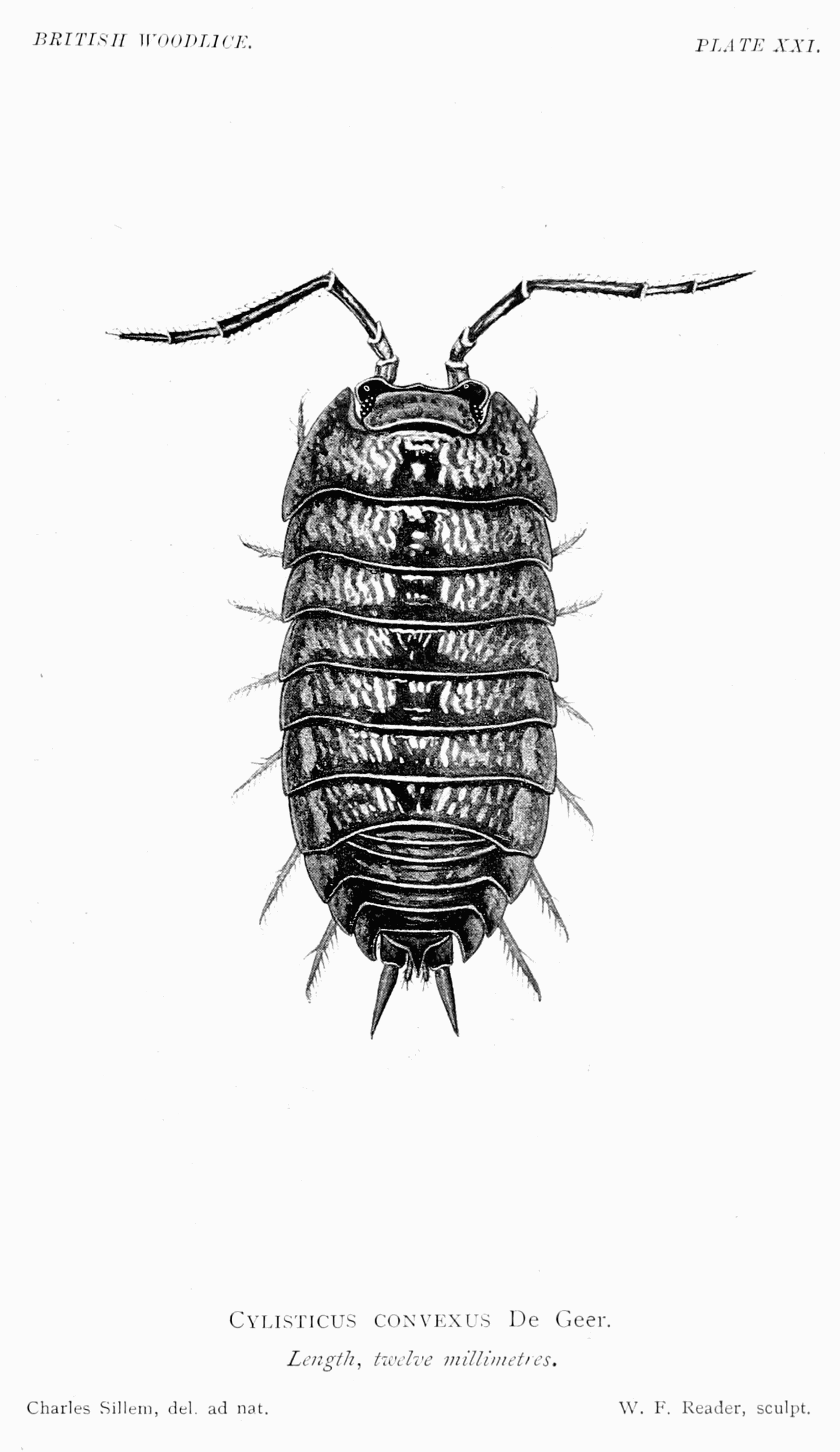
- Cylisticus convexus

Scientific classification
- Kingdom: Animalia
- Phylum: Arthropoda
- Class: Malacostraca
- Order: Isopoda
- Suborder: Oniscidea
- Infraorder: Holoverticata
- Family: Cylisticidae; Verhoeff, 1949

= Cylisticidae =

Family of crustaceans

Cylisticidae is a family of woodlice in the order Isopoda. There are at least 4 genera and more than 60 described species in Cylisticidae.

== Genera ==
These four genera belong to the family Cylisticidae:

- Cylisticus Schnitzler, 1853 (53 species)
- Lepinisticus Manicastri & Taiti, 1983 (monotypic)
- Parcylisticus Verhoeff, 1943 (10 species)
- Troglocylisticus Ferrara & Taiti, 1983 (monotypic)
