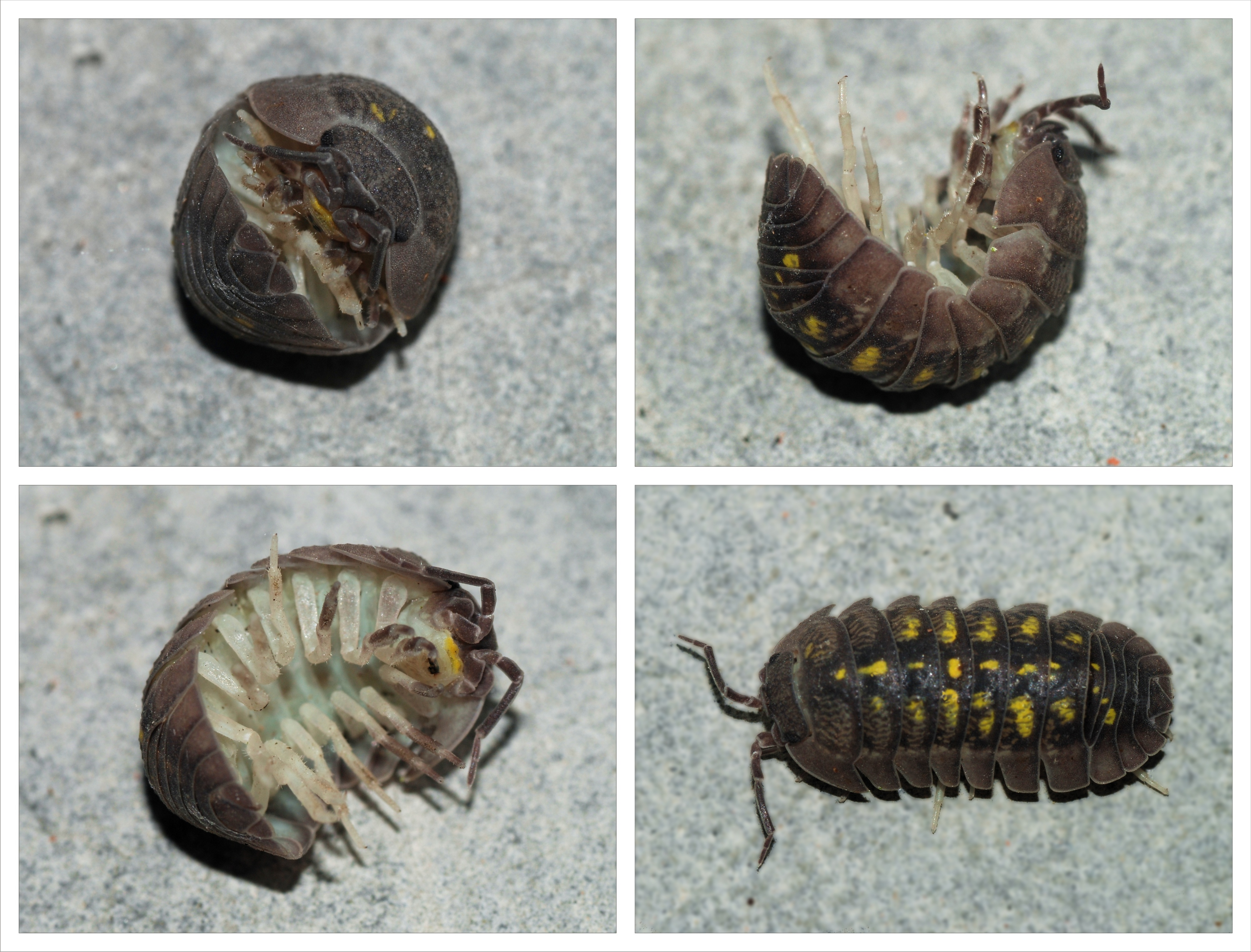
- An Armadillidium granulatum in various stages of conglobation, i.e., "rolling up"

Scientific classification
- Kingdom: Animalia
- Phylum: Arthropoda
- Clade: Pancrustacea
- Class: Malacostraca
- Order: Isopoda
- Suborder: Oniscidea
- Section: Crinocheta
- Family: Armadillidiidae; Brandt, 1833

Genera
- See text

= Armadillidiidae =

Armadillidiidae Temporal range: Chattian–present

Family of woodlice, a terrestrial crustacean group in the order Isopoda

Armadillidiidae is a family of woodlice in the order Isopoda. Members of the family are commonly known as pill bugs or roly-polies. They are distinguished from other woodlouse families by features including a two-segmented antennal flagellum, the form of the uropods, and their ability to roll the body into a ball.

This rolling behaviour, known as conglobation, is used as a defence against predators and can also reduce water loss. Similar behaviour evolved independently in several other animal groups, including the outwardly similar pill millipedes. Armadillidiids typically inhabit cool, damp and shaded places with decaying organic matter. Their diet consists largely of decomposing plant material, although they may also feed on living plants and other organic matter; some can become agricultural pests under favourable conditions.

== Common names ==
Name	Region
Basketball bug	US
Bed pisser Pissebed/Bedpisser	Netherlands / Belgium
Bench biter	Denmark
Bicho bolita	Argentina
Carpenter	Canada, US (certain regions)
Cellar bug	Germany
Cement bug	Canada
Cheesy bug	UK (parts of)
Chiggy pig	UK (Devon)
Chuckie pig	US (South)
Cochinilla	Mexico
Curly bug	Canada
Dangomushi (dumpling bug)	Japan
Doodlebug, doodle bug	US
Fat Pig	Ireland
Gramersow	UK (Cornwall)
Gray sow	Sweden
Gongbeolle (ball bug), jwimyeoneuri (rat’s daughter-in-law)	Korea
Chanchito (little pig)	South America (certain countries)
Little soil pig/small creature/Saint Anthony's little pig(porcellino di terra/onisco/porcellino di Sant' Antonio)	Italy
Marranito	Colombia
Parsons pig	UK
Pill bug	Global
Possibly "closed door" Cloporte	Francophone regions
Potato bug	UK, Canada, US
Roll-up bug	US
Rollie Pollie, Roly Poly	US, Canada, Australia
Slater bug	Australia
Slater	Australia, New Zealand, Scotland, Ireland (Ulster)
Sowbug, sow bug	US, Canada
Tatu bolinha	Brazil
Twiddle bug	US
Uri Kadoori (sphere-like "Uri")	Israel
Woodbug	Canada
Woodlouse	UK, Australia, US

== Ecology and behavior ==
Pill bugs in the family Armadillidiidae are able to form their bodies into a ball shape, in a process known as conglobation. Conglobation has evolved independently in several families; this behaviour is shared with pill millipedes (which are often confused with pill bugs), armadillos, cuckoo wasps, and some extinct trilobites. It may be triggered by stimuli such as vibrations or pressure, and is a key defense against predation; it may also reduce respiratory water losses. This defense mechanism is possible because of their segmented body structure. Armadillidiidae have overlapping plates called tergites that are connected by flexible joints. The tergites allow the body to roll up inwards. To roll up, they have muscles called pleopods that contract the abdominal tergites inwards.

The diet of pill bugs is largely made up of decaying or decomposed plant matter such as leaves and, to a lesser extent, wood fibers. Pill bugs also eat living plants, especially in wet conditions, sometimes consuming leaves, stems, shoots, roots, tubers, and fruits. Some species of pill bugs are known to eat decaying animal flesh or feces. They will also eat shed snakeskin and dead bugs, if necessary. This diet has a secondary effect of accelerating the breakdown of litter, aiding in the retention of organic material in the soil. This helps in balancing the carbon content in the soil. Pill bugs also contribute to their ecosystem as detritivores.

Pill bugs are often found in damp places with ample amounts of decaying matter, such as leaf litter and compost piles. Pill bugs are usually found in cool, damp, shaded places such as beneath rocks, logs, fallen leaves, and mulch, and they are most active at night. However, pill bugs can be serious pests in certain agricultural systems, particularly in areas that are prone to heavy rains and flood conditions.

Pill bugs will feed on numerous crop plants including corn, beans, squash, peas, melon, chard, beet, cucumber, potato, spinach, lettuce, and strawberry, with potential for significant yield loss in strawberry in particular. Since they are attracted to decaying plant matter, they are often found on farms eating the crop residue, which can lead them to start eating emerging seedlings. This has started to pose agricultural problems in Southern Australia. Farmers in the United States and Argentina have also reported increased rates of pill bugs destroying seed oil and soybean crops. They have also been observed eating wood supports in houses, making them a house pest.

== Classification ==
The family Armadillidiidae is differentiated from other woodlouse families by the two-segmented nature of the antennal flagellum, by the form of the uropods, and by the ability to roll into a ball.

Within the family Armadillidiidae, 18 genera are currently recognized:

Seventeen of these are:

- Alloschizidium Verhoeff, 1919 (13 species)
- Armadillidium Brandt, 1831 (more than 200 species)
- Ballodillium Vandel, 1961 (monotypic)
- Cristarmadillidium Arcangeli, 1936 (4 species)
- Cyphodillidium Verhoeff, 1939 (monotypic)
- Echinarmadillidium Verhoeff, 1901 (3 species)
- Eleoniscus Racovitza, 1907 (monotypic)
- Eluma Budde-Lund, 1885 (5 species)
- Estenarmadillidium Cifuentes, 2021 (monotypic)
- Paraschizidium Verhoeff, 1919 (5 species)
- Paxodillidium Schmalfuss, 1985 (monotypic)
- Platanosphaera Strouhal, 1956 (6 species)
- Schizidium Verhoeff, 1901 (26 species)
- Trichodillidium Schmalfuss, 1989 (3 species)
- Troglarmadillidium Verhoeff, 1900 (8 species)
- Trogleluma Vandel, 1946 (2 species)
- Typhlarmadillidium Verhoeff, 1900 (4 species)

A 2022 study of myrmecophilous populations indicated that these represented a new species of Cristarmadillidium, and three new species within a new genus, Iberiarmadillidium.
