= Volvation =

Defensive reaction of certain animals

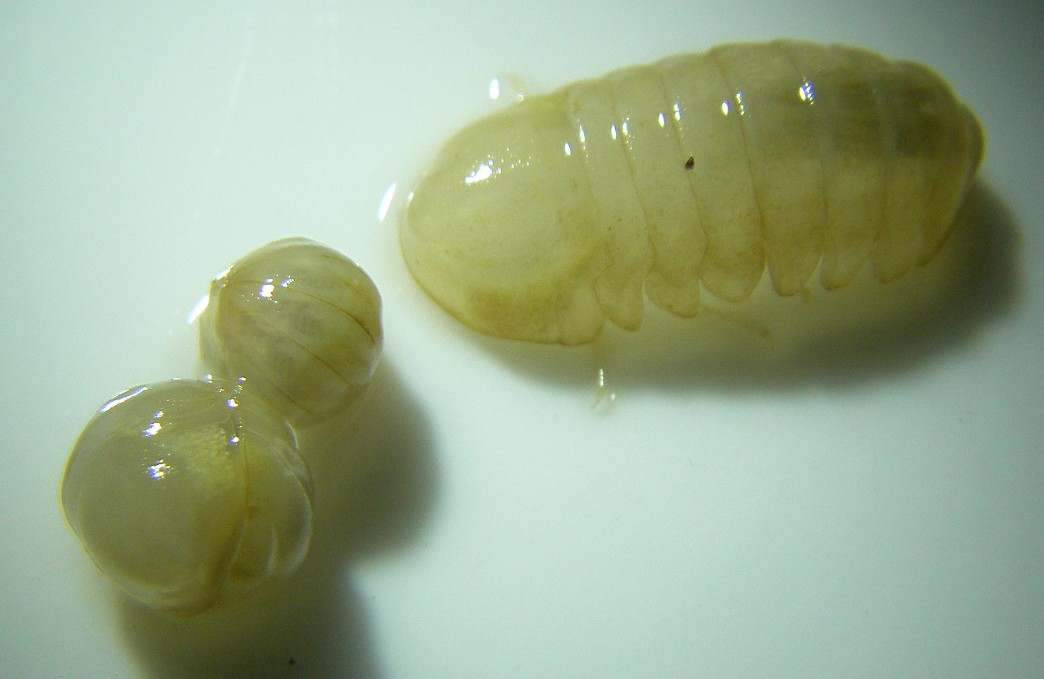
Caecosphaeroma burgundum: two of three isopods exhibiting volvation

Volvation (from Latin volvere "roll", and the suffix -(a)tion; sometimes called enrolment or conglobation) is a mainly defensive behavior of certain animals in which the animal rolls its body into a ball, presenting only the hardest parts of its integument (the animal's "armor") or its spines to predators. The behaviour can also be to conserve moisture, rather than primarily for defence, in some species such as members of the earthworms and woodlouse.

== Examples and variation ==
Mammals such as pangolins (Manidae) and hedgehogs (Erinaceidae) exhibit the ability to conglobate. Armadillos in the genus Tolypeutes (South American three-banded armadillos) are able to roll into a defensive ball, but the nine-banded armadillo and other species have too many plates to do so.

Earthworms may volvate during periods of extreme heat or drought. Among pill millipedes, volvation is a protection against both external threats and against dehydration. At least eight families of flat-backed millipedes are known to practice true volvation; these are described as oniscoid (woodlouse-like).

The pauropod family Sphaeropauropodidae has the ability to coil completely into a tight sphere.

Woodlice curl themselves into spheres or spheroids not primarily for defense, but to conserve moisture while resting or sleeping, because they must keep their pseudotrachaea ("gills") wet. Volvation is common for subterranean isopods, but only Caecosphaeroma burgundum is able to roll into a hermetic sphere without any outward projections. The common name pillbugs is used for members of the woodouse family Armadillidae, as they are thought to resemble pills when curled.

Multi-shelled chitons also volvate, although evidence suggests that they do not use this behavior as an anti-predatory defense but rather as a form of locomotion.

In vertebrates, an animal's decision to volvate is mediated by the periaqueductal gray region.

== Gallery ==
Examples of species that practice volvation:

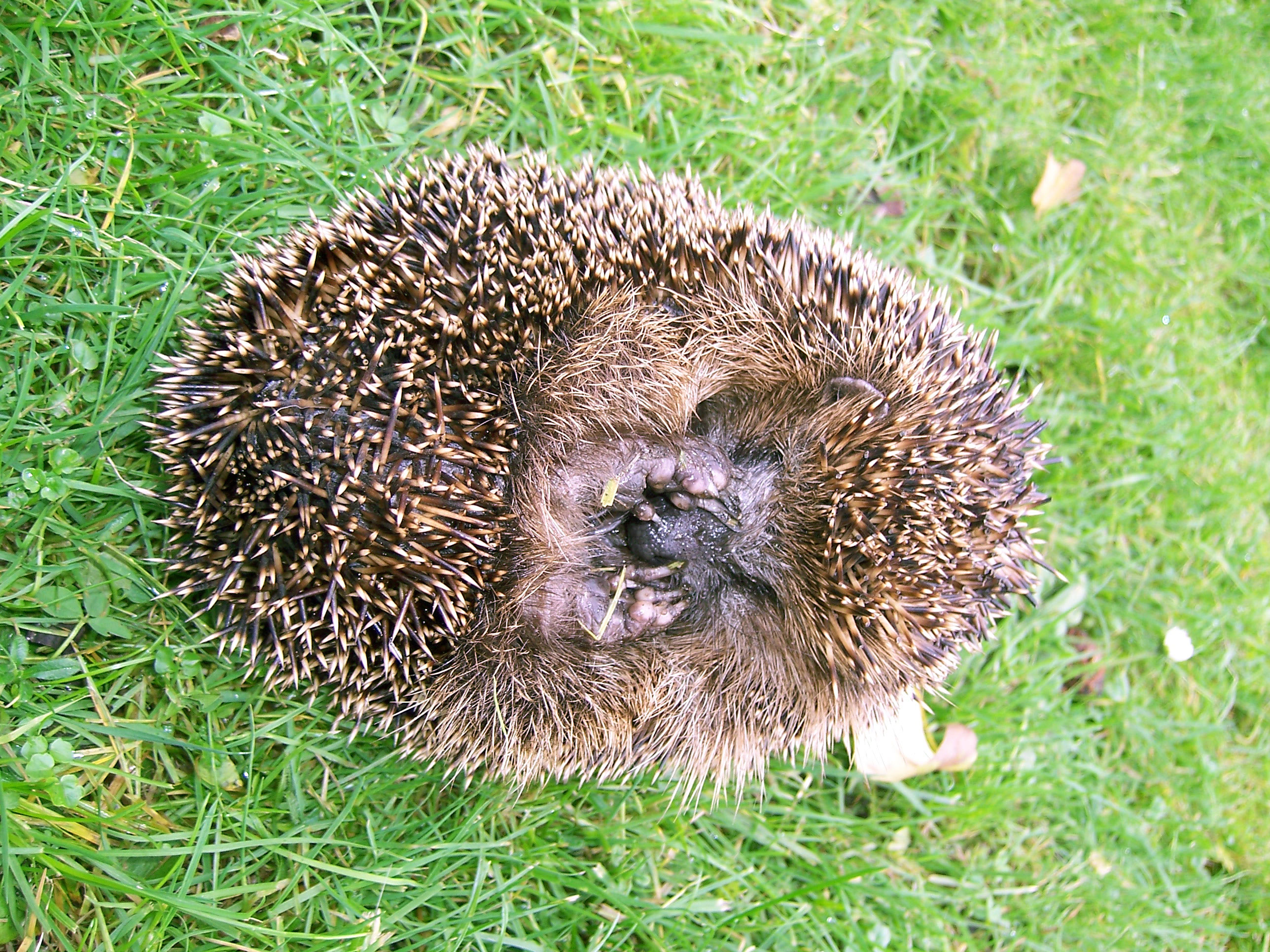
The European hedgehog (Erinaceus europaeus).

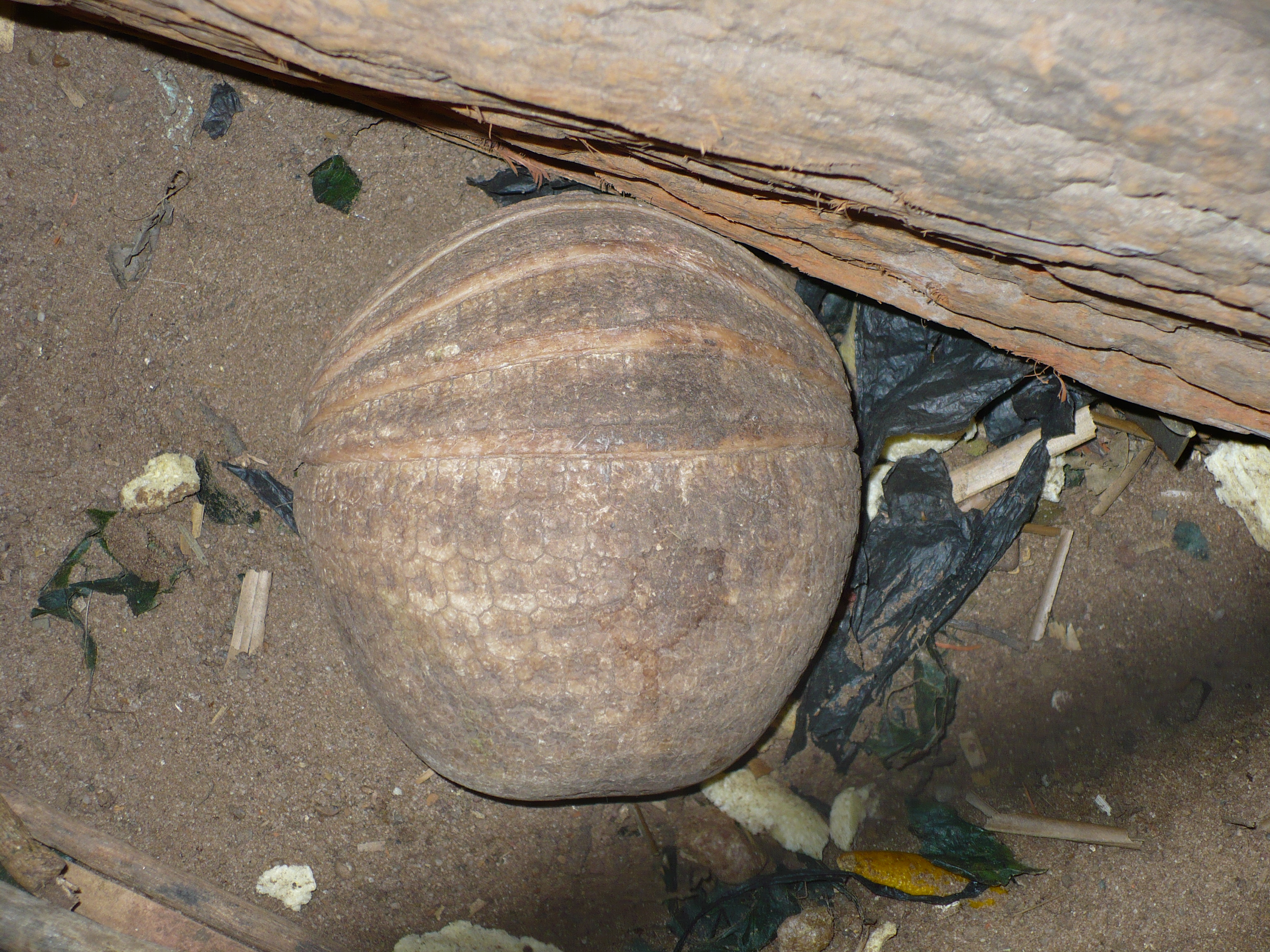
The Southern three-banded armadillo (Tolypeutes matacus).

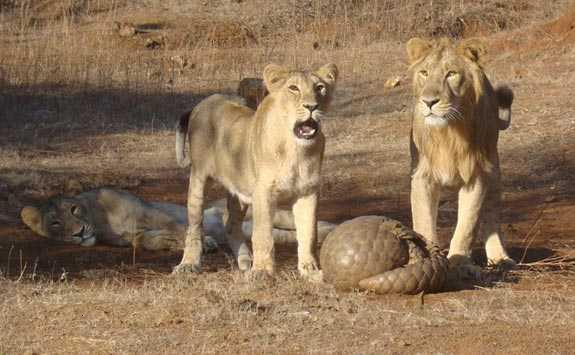
An Indian pangolin (Manis crassicaudata) defending itself against Asiatic lions (Panthera leo leo).

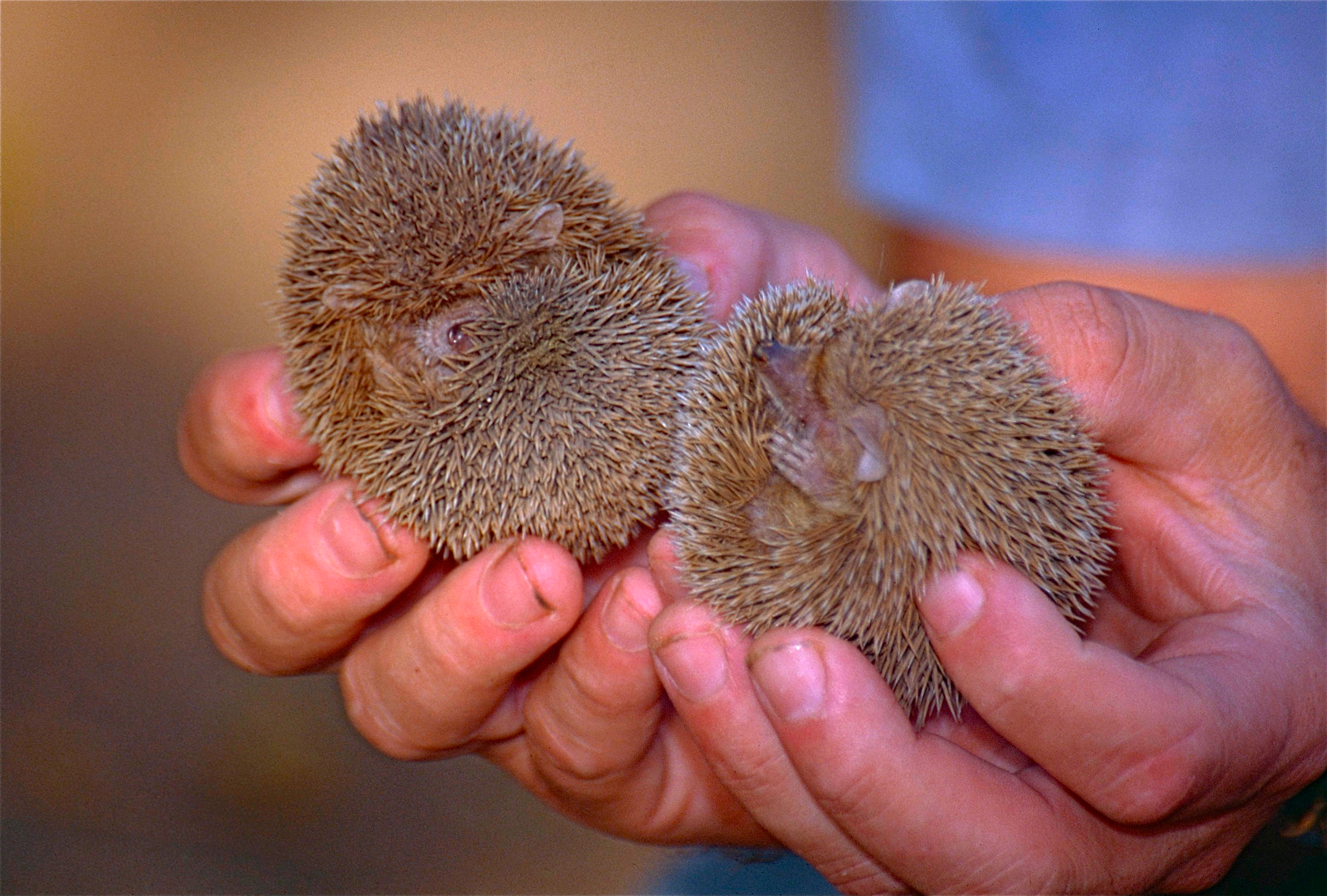
Two lesser hedgehog tenrecs (Echinops telfairi).

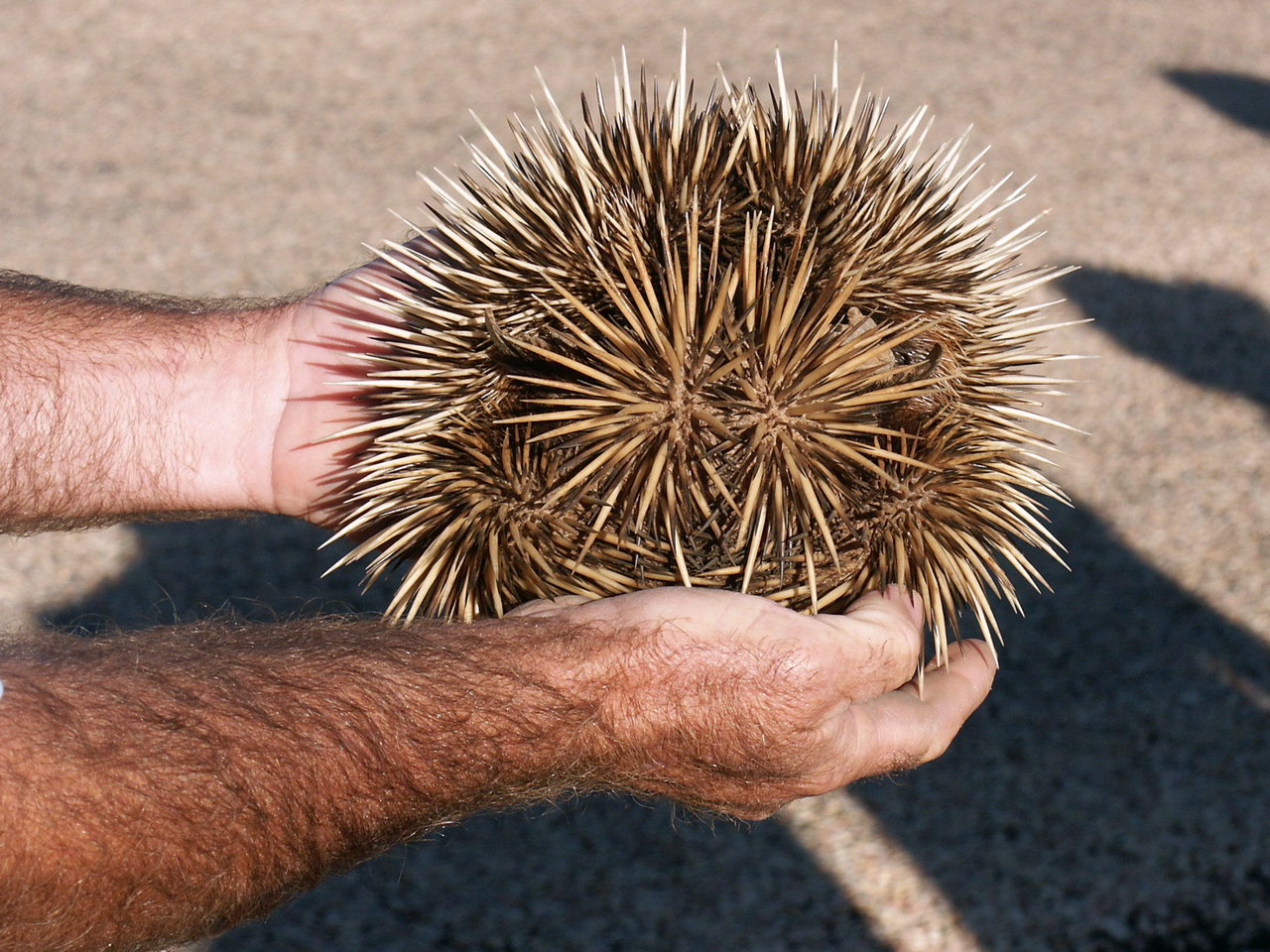
Short-beaked echidna (Tachyglossus aculeatus) curling into a ball.
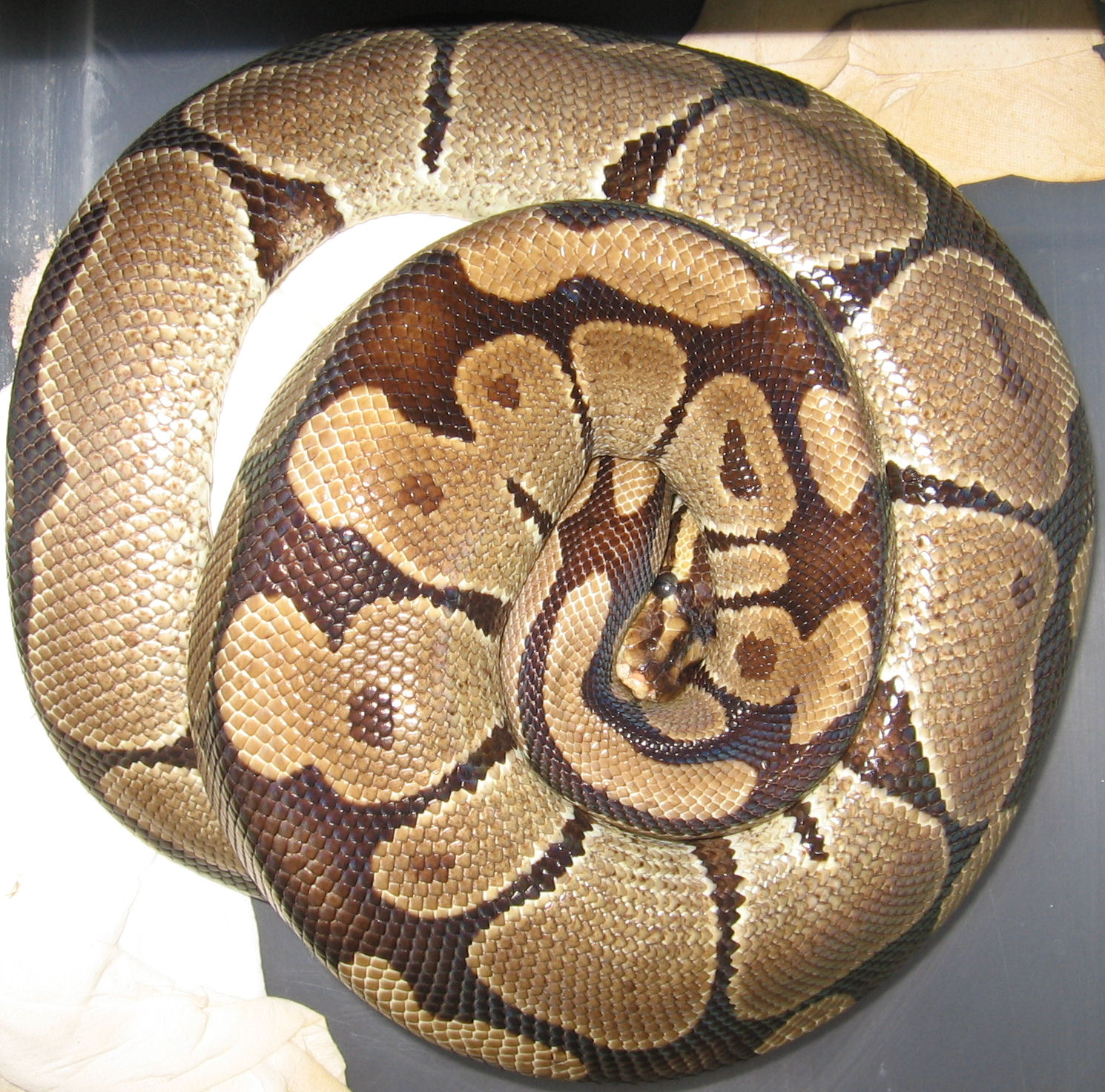
The ball python (Python regius) curls into a ball when stressed or frightened.

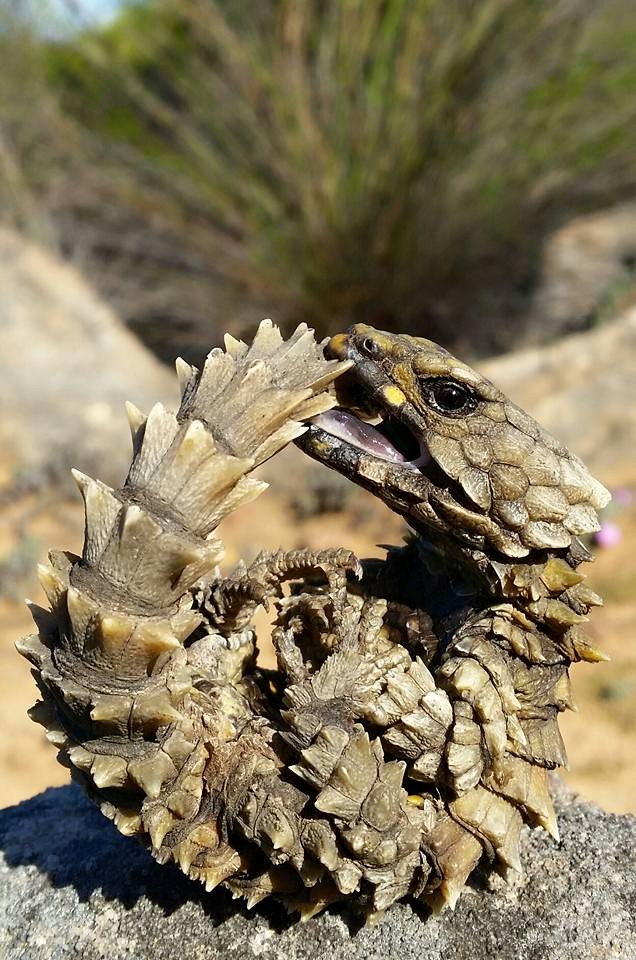
The armadillo girdled lizard (Ouroborus cataphractus).

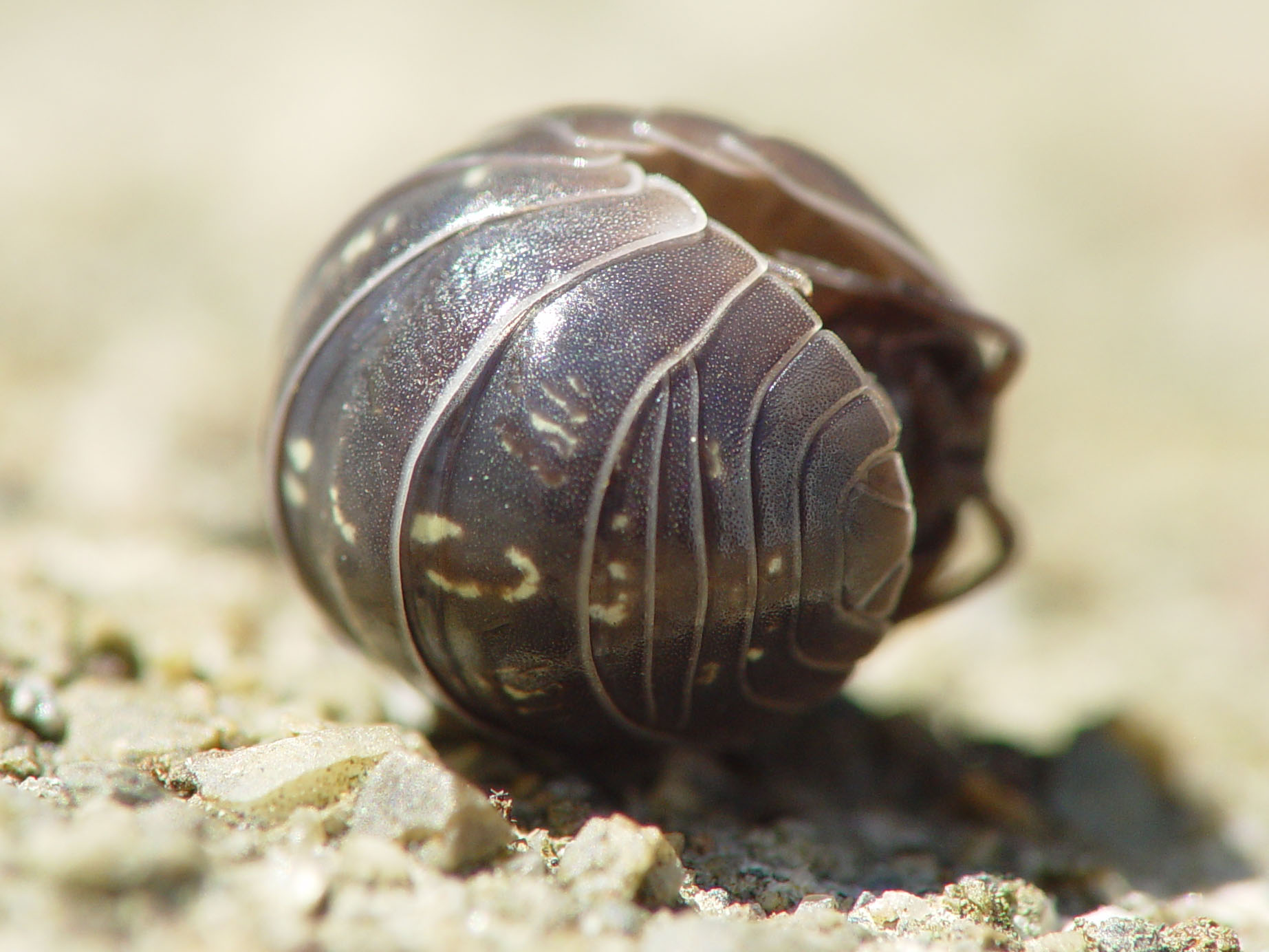
The common pillbug (Armadillidium vulgare) is so named because it assumes a pill-like form when volvating.

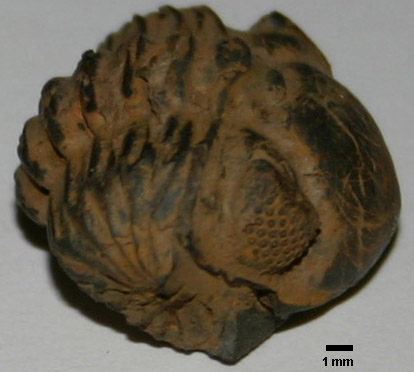
Phacops rana, a trilobite from the Devonian period.

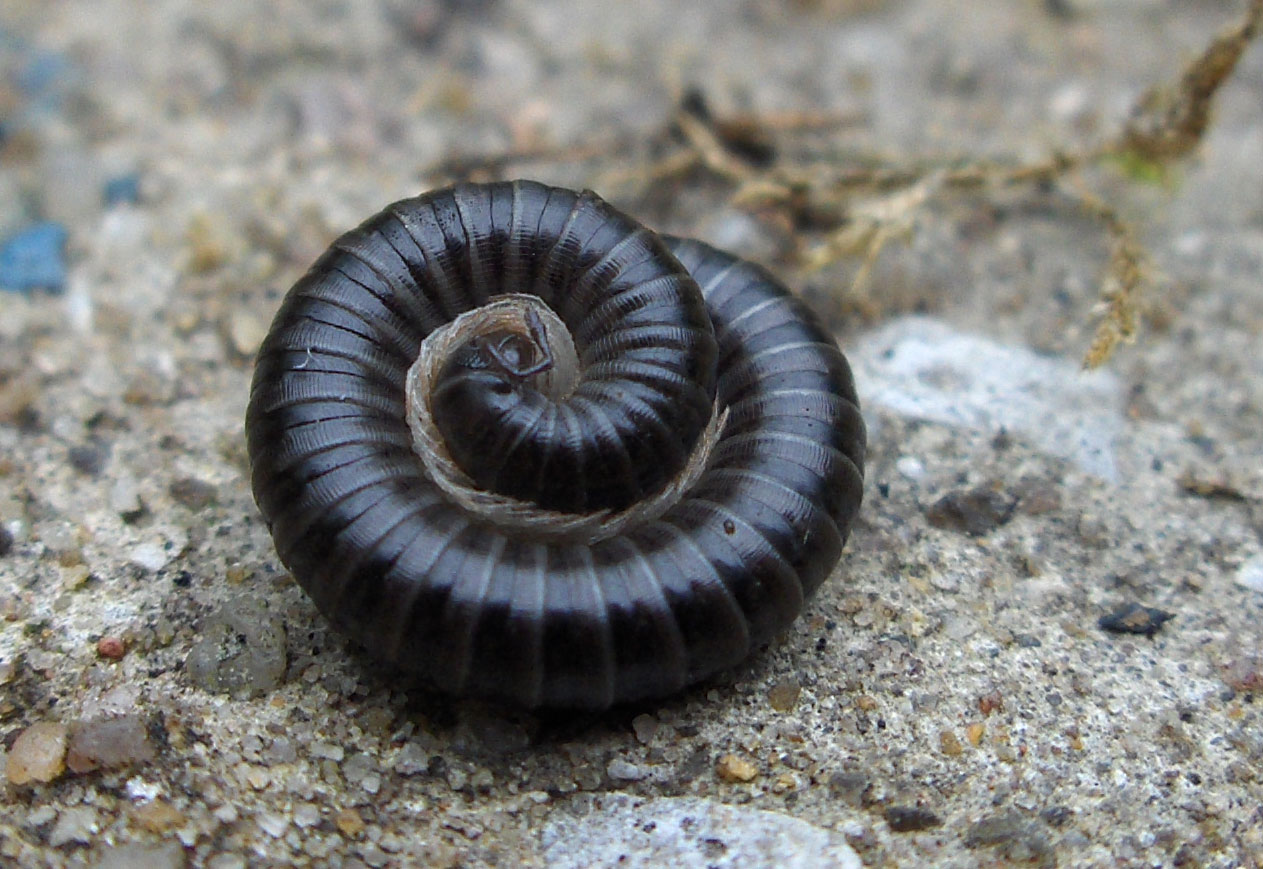
Tachypodoiulus niger, a millipede, with legs on the inside and head in the center.
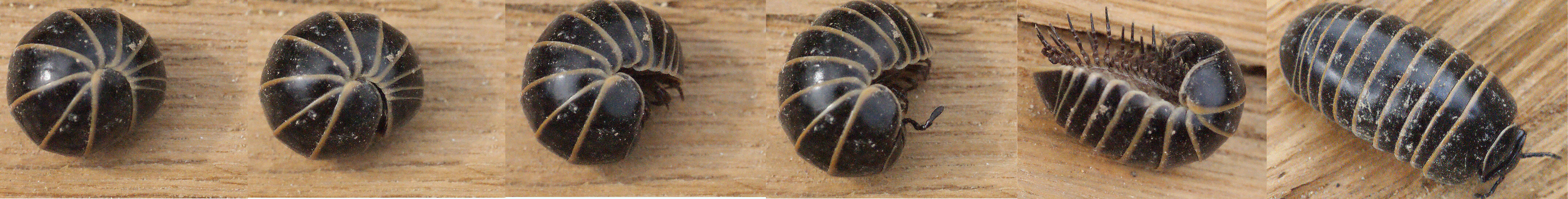
Stages of a pill millipede (Glomeris marginata) unrolling.

== See also ==
- Rotating locomotion in living systems
