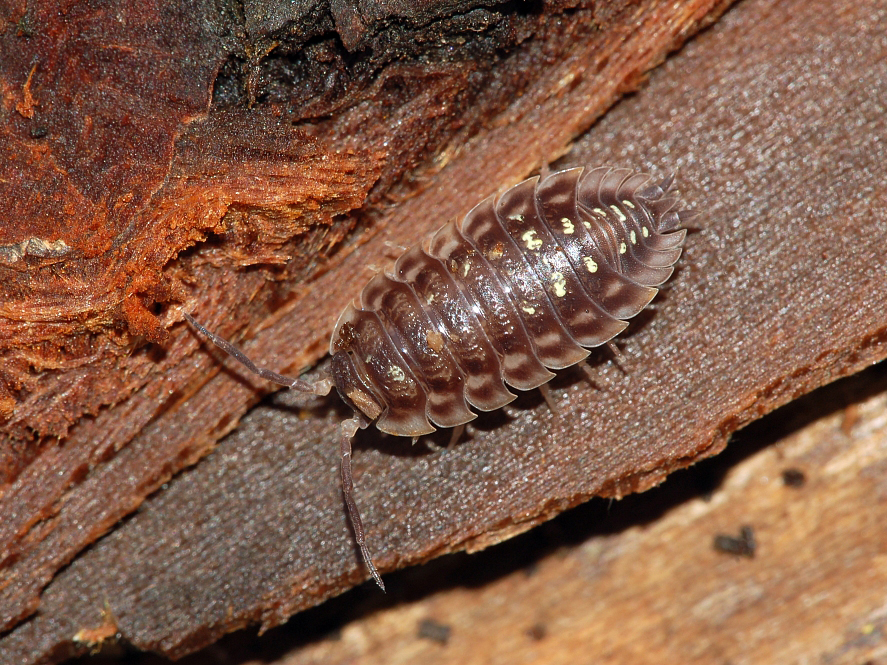
- Oniscus asellus

Scientific classification
- Kingdom: Animalia
- Phylum: Arthropoda
- Clade: Pancrustacea
- Class: Malacostraca
- Order: Isopoda
- Suborder: Oniscidea
- Section: Crinocheta
- Superfamily: Oniscoidea; Latreille, 1802

Families
- 15; see text

= Oniscoidea =

Superfamily of isopod crustaceans

Oniscoidea is a superfamily of isopod crustaceans, which includes most of the land-living woodlice. It includes the "common woodlouse", Oniscus asellus, in the namesake family Oniscidae.

== Families ==
Fifteen families are recognised in the superfamily :

- Bathytropidae Vandel, 1952
- Berytoniscidae Vandel, 1973
- Detonidae Budde-Lund, 1906
- Halophilosciidae Verhoeff, 1908
- Olibrinidae Vandel, 1973
- Oniscidae Latreille, 1802
- Philosciidae Kinahan, 1857
- Platyarthridae Vandel, 1946
- Pudeoniscidae Lemos de Castro, 1973
- Rhyscotidae Budde-Lund, 1908
- Scyphacidae Dana, 1852
- Speleoniscidae Vandel, 1948
- Sphaeroniscidae Vandel, 1964
- Stenoniscidae Budde-Lund, 1904
- Tendosphaeridae Verhoeff, 1930
