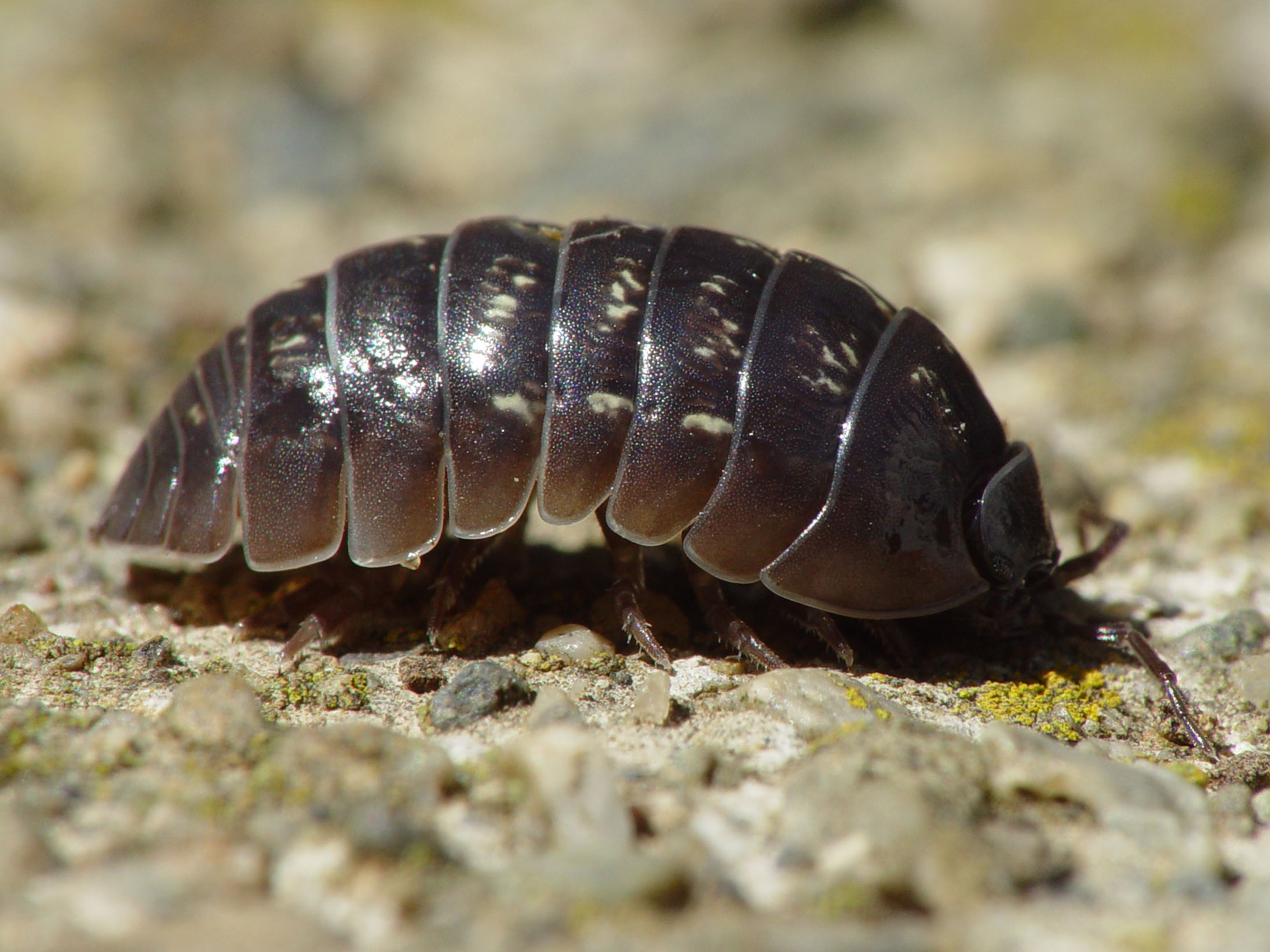
- Armadillidium vulgare

Scientific classification
- Kingdom: Animalia
- Phylum: Arthropoda
- Clade: Pancrustacea
- Class: Malacostraca
- Order: Isopoda
- Suborder: Oniscidea
- Parvorder: Orthogonopoda
- Section: Crinocheta; Legrand, 1946

= Crinocheta =

Type of isopods

Crinocheta is a clade of woodlice. It is the most diverse group of land-dwelling isopods (Oniscidea). Crinocheta is regarded as monophyletic and the sister group of the clade Synocheta. Some researchers refer to the group of the clades Crinocheta, Synocheta, and Microcheta as Orthogonopoda.

== Description ==
The plesiomorphic form of Crinocheta has two transverse lines present on the cephalothorax (linea frontalis or the linea supraantennalis), a "marginal line" that can be found on the vertex of the head (linea marginalis) and is a "runner" morphotype. Some families have lost the linea frontalis and/or the linea supraantennalis but all members have retained the linea marginalis.

Crinocheta have a large number of ommatidia compared to other oniscidean clades. Some reports claim up to 200 ommatidia can be present in some genera but many dispute this claim and maximum of 80. The majority of species have no more than 30 ommatidia.

The second antennae of this clade appear to be made of only five articles because the basal-most article is fused with the head capsule. The distal end of these antennae also bare a tuft that acts as a sensory organ.

In almost all Crinocheta the legs of the first thoracic segment have a distal end with a brush for cleaning the antennae.

Many Crinocheta can conglobate but not all.

== Etymology ==
This clade was first introduced by Jean-Jacques Legrand in 1946. The origin of the name Crinocheta is not certain but it may refer to the forked penes present in this group.

== Families ==
There are currently 31 families that are considered part of this clade.

- Agnaridae Schmidt, 2003
- Alloniscidae Schmidt, 2003
- Armadillidae Brandt in Brandt & Ratzeburg, 1831
- Armadillidiidae Brandt, 1833
- Balloniscidae Vandel, 1963
- Bathytropidae Vandel, 1952
- Berytoniscidae Vandel, 1955
- Bisilvestriidae Verhoeff, 1938
- Cylisticidae Verhoeff, 1949
- Delatorreiidae Verhoeff, 1938
- Detonidae Budde-Lund, 1904
- Dubioniscidae Schultz, 1995
- Eubelidae Budde-Lund, 1899
- Halophilosciidae Verhoeff, 1908
- Hekelidae Ferrara, 1977
- Olibrinidae Budde-Lund, 1912 *
- Oniscidae Latreille, 1802
- Paraplatyarthridae Javidkar & King, 2015
- Philosciidae Kinahan, 1857
- Platyarthridae Verhoeff, 1949
- Porcellionidae Brandt in Brandt & Ratzeburg, 1831
- Pudeoniscidae Lemos de Castro, 1973
- Rhyscotidae Budde-Lund, 1904
- Scleropactidae Verhoeff, 1938
- Scyphacidae Dana, 1853
- Spelaeoniscidae Vandel, 1948
- Stenoniscidae Budde-Lund, 1904
- Tendosphaeridae Verhoeff, 1930
- Thrakosphaeridae Giurginca in Giurginca, Mîrleneanu & Baba, 2025
- Trachelipodidae Strouhal, 1953

*These families' places in this clade have been occasionally disputed.
