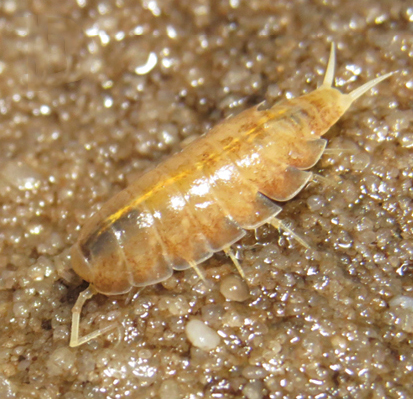
- Trichoniscus tabulae
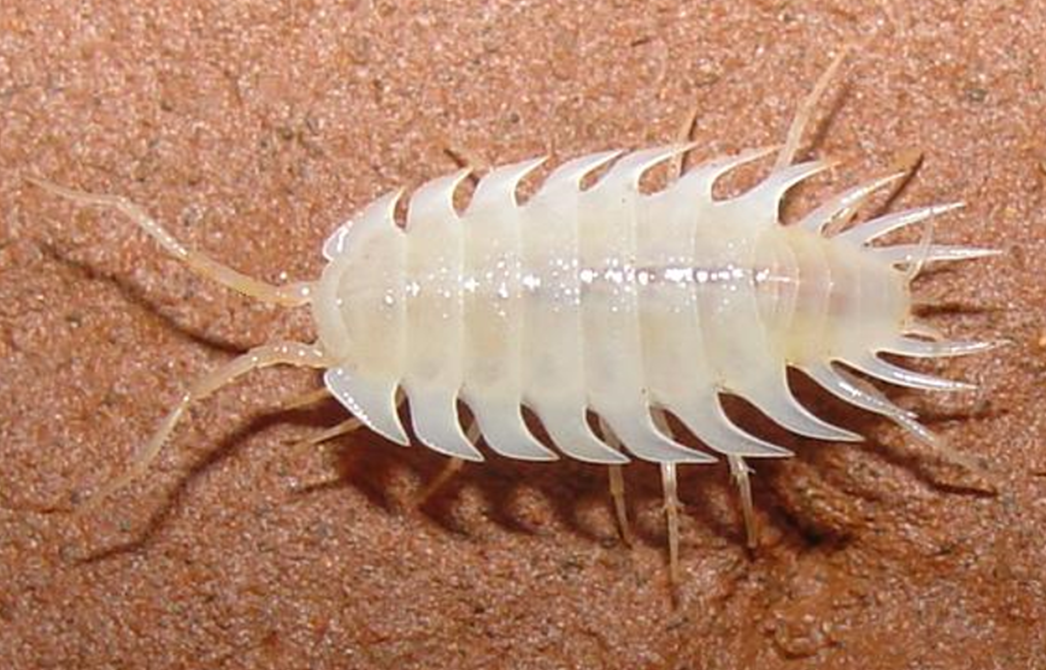
- Iuiuniscus iuiuensis

Scientific classification
- Kingdom: Animalia
- Phylum: Arthropoda
- Clade: Pancrustacea
- Class: Malacostraca
- Order: Isopoda
- Suborder: Oniscidea
- Parvorder: Orthogonopoda
- Section: Synocheta; Legrand, 1946

= Synocheta =

Monophyletic section of isopods

Synocheta is a major monophyletic section of small, often frail-appearing isopods in the suborder Oniscidea. It is currently considered closely related to the smaller section Microcheta, which together form the clade Monospermophora, although some workers consider it to be closer to the much larger section Crinocheta. All three sections form the monophyletic supersection Orthogonopoda, which contains the vast majority of the diversity within Oniscidea.

== Description ==
The section Synocheta is mainly defined by the fusion of the ejaculatory ducts in the male genital apophysis, resulting in a single spermatophore being produced. In Microcheta, a single spermatophore is also produced but the ducts remain separate, while in Crinocheta two spermatophores are produced from distantly-placed ducts. In addition, many members of Synocheta generally have 3 or less ommatidia, and the pleopod protopod remoter muscles M9, M11 and M13 have 2 strands instead of 3.

== Taxonomy ==
There are 5-6 families in Synocheta split between 2 superfamilies, Styloniscoidea and Trichoniscoidea. The family Buddelundiellidae is often placed as a subfamily of the family Trichoniscidae, although some authors dispute this and raise it to family level.

This section includes the following families:

- Buddelundiellidae Verhöeff, 1930
- Schoebliidae Verhöeff, 1938
- Styloniscidae Vandel, 1952
- Trichoniscidae Sars, 1899
- Titanidae Verhöeff, 1938
- Turanoniscidae Borutzky, 1969
