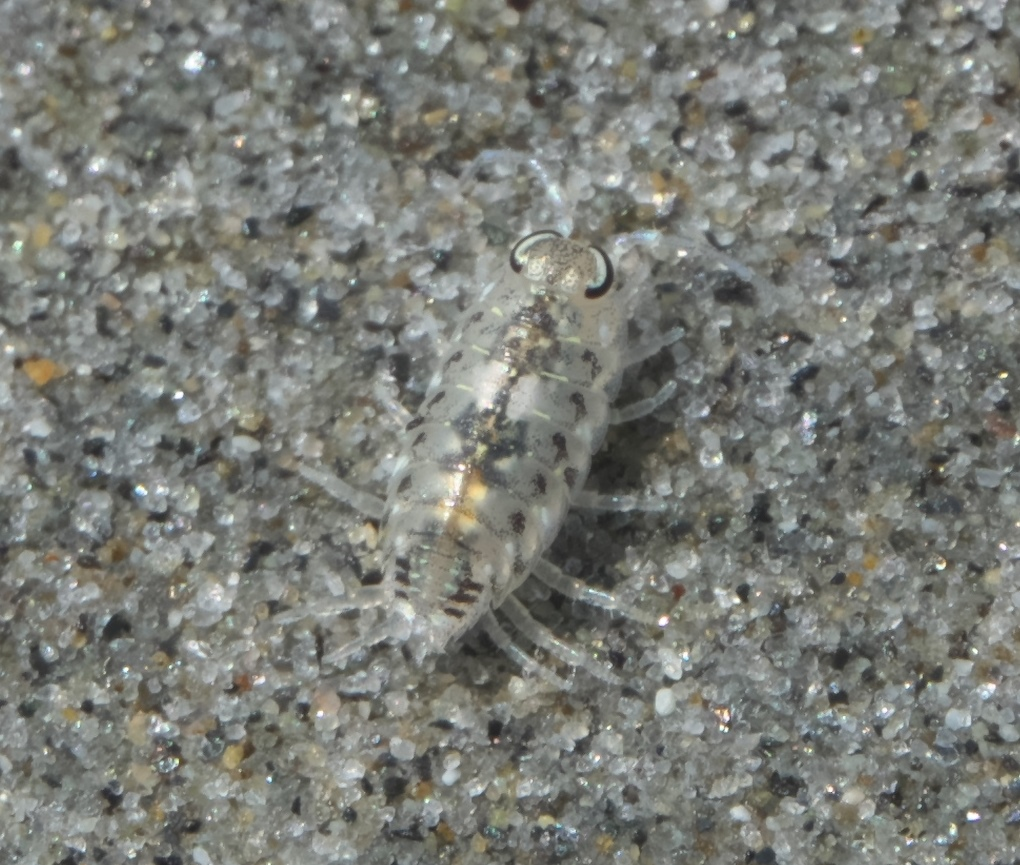

Scientific classification
- Kingdom: Animalia
- Phylum: Arthropoda
- Clade: Pancrustacea
- Class: Malacostraca
- Order: Isopoda
- Suborder: Oniscidea
- Family: Scyphacidae
- Genus: Scyphax
- Species: S. ornatus

Binomial name
- Scyphax ornatus Dana, 1853

= Scyphax ornatus =

Species of isopod

Scyphax ornatus is a species of Isopoda endemic to New Zealand.
