= Rhyscotus =

Scientific classification
- Kingdom: Animalia
- Phylum: Arthropoda
- Clade: Pancrustacea
- Class: Malacostraca
- Order: Isopoda
- Suborder: Oniscidea
- Family: Rhyscotidae
- Genus: Rhyscotus; Budde-Lund, 1885

Genus of woodlice

Rhyscotus is a genus of crinochetan isopods in the family Rhyscotidae. It was first described in 1885 by Gustav Budde-Lund.

The genus comprises the following species:

- Rhyscotus albidemaculatus Budde-Lund, 1908
- Rhyscotus australis Lewis, 1998
- Rhyscotus bicolor Barnard, 1924
- Rhyscotus colimensis Mulaik, 1960
- Rhyscotus globiceps Budde-Lund, 1908
- Rhyscotus jacksoni Arcangeli, 1931
- Rhyscotus nasutus Budde-Lund, 1908
- Rhyscotus rotundatus Schmalfuss & Ferrara, 1978
- Rhyscotus somaliensis Ferrara, 1972
- Rhyscotus sphaerocephalus Budde-Lund, 1893
- Rhyscotus texensis (Richardson, 1905)
- Rhyscotus turgifrons Budde-Lund, 1885
