= Rhyscotus rotundatus =

Scientific classification
- Kingdom: Animalia
- Phylum: Arthropoda
- Clade: Pancrustacea
- Class: Malacostraca
- Order: Isopoda
- Suborder: Oniscidea
- Family: Rhyscotidae
- Genus: Rhyscotus
- Species: R. rotundatus

Binomial name
- Rhyscotus rotundatus Schmalfuss & Ferrara, 1978

Species of woodlouse

Rhyscotus rotundatus is a species land isopod in the family Rhyscotidae. It is endemic to the island of São Tomé in São Tomé and Príncipe. The species was described in 1978 by Helmut Schmalfuss and Franco Ferrara.
