= Scyphax =

Scientific classification
- Kingdom: Animalia
- Phylum: Arthropoda
- Clade: Pancrustacea
- Class: Malacostraca
- Order: Isopoda
- Suborder: Oniscidea
- Family: Scyphacidae
- Genus: Scyphax; Dana, 1853

Type species
- Scyphax ornatus Dana, 1853

Genus of isopods

Scyphax is a genus of woodlice in the family Scyphacidae. It contains three species, with Scyphax ornatus being its type species.

== Species ==
Scyphax contains the following species:

- Scyphax crescentia Lewis, 1998
- Scyphax ornatus Dana, 1853
- Scyphax setiger Budde-Lund, 1885
