= Sphaeroniscidae =

Scientific classification
- Domain: Eukaryota
- Kingdom: Animalia
- Phylum: Arthropoda
- Class: Malacostraca
- Order: Isopoda
- Suborder: Oniscidea
- Superfamily: Oniscoidea
- Family: Sphaeroniscidae

Family of crustaceans

Sphaeroniscidae is a family of crustaceans belonging to the order Isopoda.

Genera:

- Amazoniscus Lemos de Castro, 1967
- Circoniscus Pearse, 1917
- Neosanfilippia Brian, 1957
- Protosphaeroniscus Schmalfuss, 1980
- Richardsoniscus Vandel, 1963
- Scleropactes Budde-Lund, 1885
- Sphaeroniscus Gerstäcker, 1854
- Spherarmadillo Richardson, 1907
