= Metaperiscyphops =

Scientific classification
- Kingdom: Animalia
- Phylum: Arthropoda
- Class: Malacostraca
- Order: Isopoda
- Suborder: Oniscidea
- Family: Eubelidae
- Genus: Metaperiscyphops
- Species: M. insulanus

Binomial name
- Metaperiscyphops insulanus Schmalfuss & Ferrara, 1976

Genus of crustaceans

Metaperiscyphops insulanus is an endemic species of armadillo woodlice, land crustacean isopods of the family Eubelidae. It occurs on the island of Príncipe in São Tomé and Príncipe. It is the only species of the genus Metaperiscyphops. The genus and the species were described in 1976 by Helmut Schmalfuss and Franco Ferrara.
