= Velika peć na Rogu =

Cave on Mount Medvednica

- Velika peć na Lipi, Velika peč, Velika pećina, Topla peć, Topla peč, Topla špilja
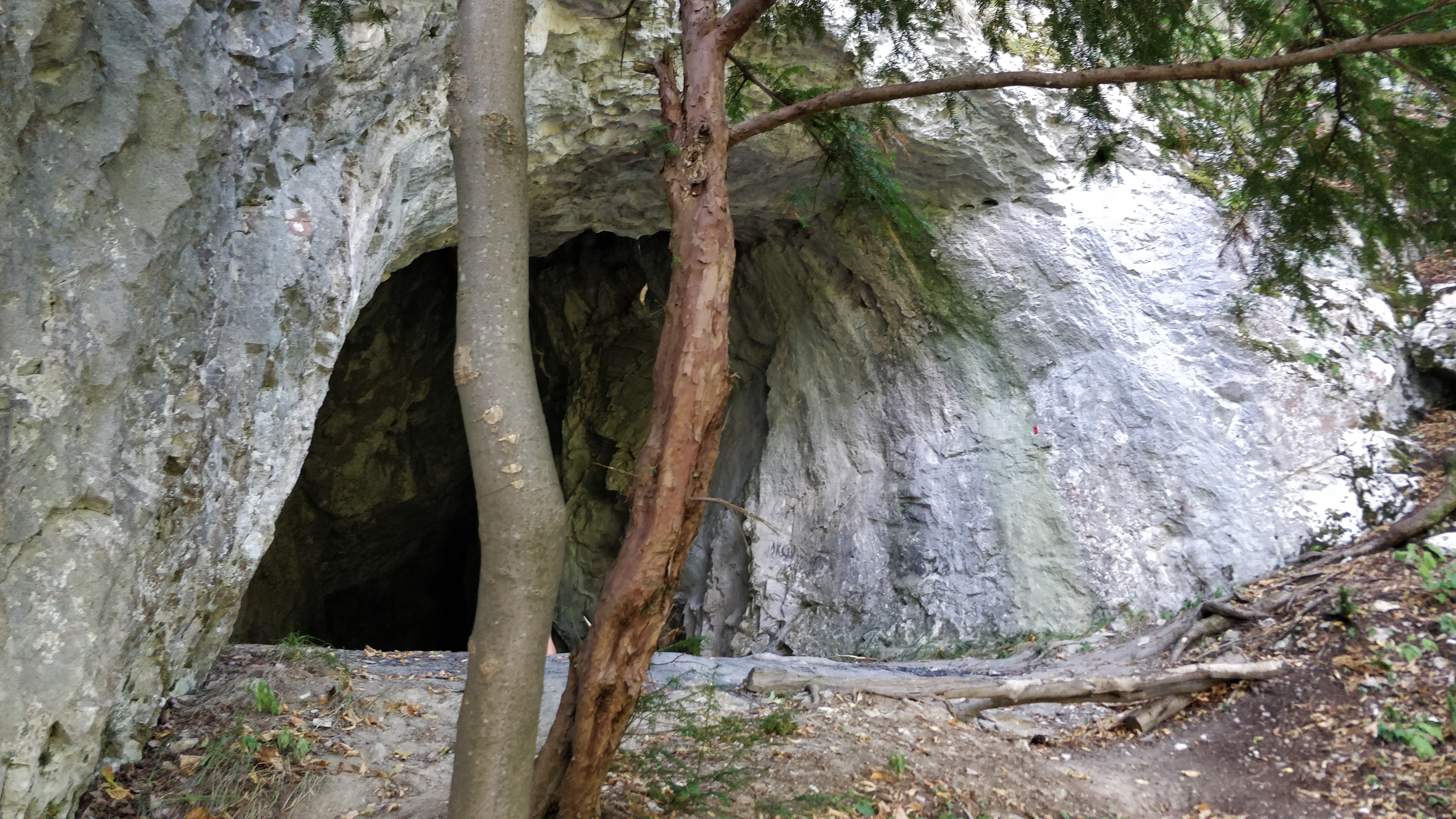
- Entrance with yew

- Location within Croatia
- Interactive map of Velika peć na Rogu
- Location: Čučerje, Sesvete
- Coordinates: 45.937560°N 16.062021°E
- Depth: 0 metres (0 ft)
- Length: 35 metres (0.022 mi)
- Elevation: 675.5 metres (2,216 ft)
- Discovery: n/a
- Geology: Karst cave
- Entrances: 1
- Access: Closed to public
- Cadastral code: HR02303

Velika peć na Rogu, also known as Velika peć na Lipi or Topla peć, is a cave on Zagrebačka gora. Along with Šupljasta pećina, it has one of the largest openings on the mountain, and has been described as its "most imposing entrance". It is also currently its 9th longest by horizontal passage length. It is far removed from most other caves on Zagrebačka gora, and situated in an older layer than most other caves thereon. It is also situated at a higher elevation than most, and about 1 kilometre (0.62 mi) as the crow flies from the peak of Rog na Lipi (709 metres (2,326 ft)). The total length of the cave is 35 metres (115 ft), with an internal vertical difference of 8 metres (26 ft).

== Etymology ==
The name Velika peć, sometimes written in its Kajkavian form Velika peč, means "Large Cave". The need to distinguish it from caves with the same name led some sources to append the epithet na Rogu, meaning "on Rog". The name Topla peć, sometimes written in its Kajkavian form Topla peč, means "Warm Cave". Sometimes the name is given with the full form of the word for "cave", {{wikt:pećina|pećina}}.

== Description ==
The cave is on a steep slope at high elevation relative to the Turopolje plain below, making access difficult and likely explaining the scarcity of human remains. The path was partly a goat path and partly nonexistent before the advent of alpinism. The entrance faces north, creating moisture issues for would-be inhabitants. Because the entrance is visible from afar within its valley, it is often visited or at least enumerated among the more notable caves of Zagrebačka gora, beginning with Dragutin Hirc in 1905, and continuing in SFRJ times, and beyond in RH times, both from a tourist perspective and from a speleological perspective.

The cave consists of two parts:

1. The entrance chamber is 20 metres (66 ft) long, 6 metres (20 ft) wide at the entrance but narrowing to 2.5 metres (8.2 ft) at the end, with similarly variable ceiling height, 9 metres (30 ft) at the entrance but 1.5 metres (4.9 ft) at the end.
2. The second part of the cave consists of a passage and appendix chambers.
  1. The passage is reached by crossing a natural step. It is narrow and low, 7.5 metres (25 ft) long, 1.5 metres (4.9 ft) wide at the beginning but 36 centimetres (14 in) wide at the end, and 1 metre (3.3 ft) high at the beginning but 30 centimetres (12 in) at the end.
  2. The appendix chambers are elongated and the second chamber switches back toward the entrance. Both are very moist, with speleothems including curtains, serrated curtains, stalactites and stalagmites. The speleothems are small, but untouched during the 1933 Poljak exploration, which did not note any footprints and concluded they were the first that far back in the cave. The first is 3 metres (9.8 ft) long, 1.6 metres (5.2 ft) wide, and about 4.2 metres (14 ft) tall. The second is 6 metres (20 ft) long, up to 2 metres (6.6 ft) wide, and 2.4 metres (7.9 ft) tall.

A map was published by Josip Poljak in 1933, and another map was made in 1960 during a cave mapping course held by the Speleološki odsjek PD "Zanatlija" (Zagreb) that year. Some of the earliest photographs of the cave were published by Josip Poljak in 1933, Željko Poljak in 1960, Mirko Malez in 1991, and so on. In the late 1980s, the local mountaineering society PD Lipa published 5 issues of a periodical titled Lipin list, which included information on the cave.

The cave is protected as part of the Medvednica Nature Park as cave number S18. Despite being legally closed to the public, the entrance is along a 4.84 miles (7.79 km) established trail (the Službeni planinarski put 31/32), with both a safer and a more dangerous approach to the cave. The path to the cave is marked by a sign, so it continues to be visited in that context, and is prominently featured on some tourist maps. But the cave had already been popular with caving societies when they were first being formed in Zagreb, beginning with the visit led by Vlado Horvat for the PD "Zagreb", which took place in 1947. It is also more specifically within the Significant environment Područje Lipa-Rog na Medvednici (br. 716).

== Climatology ==
The entrance chamber is large enough to be strongly influenced by external temperature variations. In September, the temperature at the back of the appendix was measured at 12 °C in 1933.

=== Hydrology ===
The appendix is characterised by constant dripping of water from the ceiling.

== Geology ==
Velika peć formed in a layer of highly folded semicrystalline Carboniferous dolomite. The floor follows the layering, with vertical and atmospheric erosion from younger layers in the geological column. In Poljak's judgement, the cave is tectonic in origin, expanding with groundwater flow.

The cave floor sediment is yellowish loess, mixed with. The floor is gently inclined from entrance to end, here and there with small stones and irregular concretions of tufa.

Near Velika peć in the same cliff face there are several crevices large enough for a human to fit in. The cliff is not tall, but high enough to have been used occasionally for bouldering, although legal measures to prevent this are in the process of being adopted.

== Paleontology ==
The cave was first excavated in 1957 and 1961 by a team led by Mirko Malez, then again in 1987. Only 1 square metre (11 ft^{2}) was excavated. The ornithofauna was identified in 1975 by Vesna Malez-Bačić, and the rest was identified by Mirko Malez and colleagues in 1991. A new archaeological survey was made in 1994.

=== Anthropology ===
During the initial excavations, a human phalanx was unearthed. There are signs the cave was used by humans as a temporary dwelling, along with a prehistoric (predating antiquity) fortification on the plateau above it.

=== Paleofauna ===
Fossil remains have been unearthed of rodents, bats, birds, and frogs belonging to 9 families, 15 genera, and 14 species. The postglacial fauna include: Apodemus sylvaticus, Arvicola terrestris, Clethrionomys glareolus, Lagopus lagopus, Lagopus muta, Microtus subterraneus, Rattus norvegicus, Rattus rattus, Stenocranius gregalis, Myotis myotis, Coccothraustes coccothraustes, Columba livia, Picus canus, Sylvia borin, Turdus viscivorus, and Rana arvalis. These had arrived by the Oldest Dryas or the Bølling–Allerød Interstadial. The vertebrate assemblage in this period was almost identical to that found at Veternica and Mačkova špilja, except for the presence of the Mediterranean species C. livia present thanks to the high elevation and cliff warmth. No older remains have yet been found, although the unearthed specimens have yet to be radiocarbon dated.

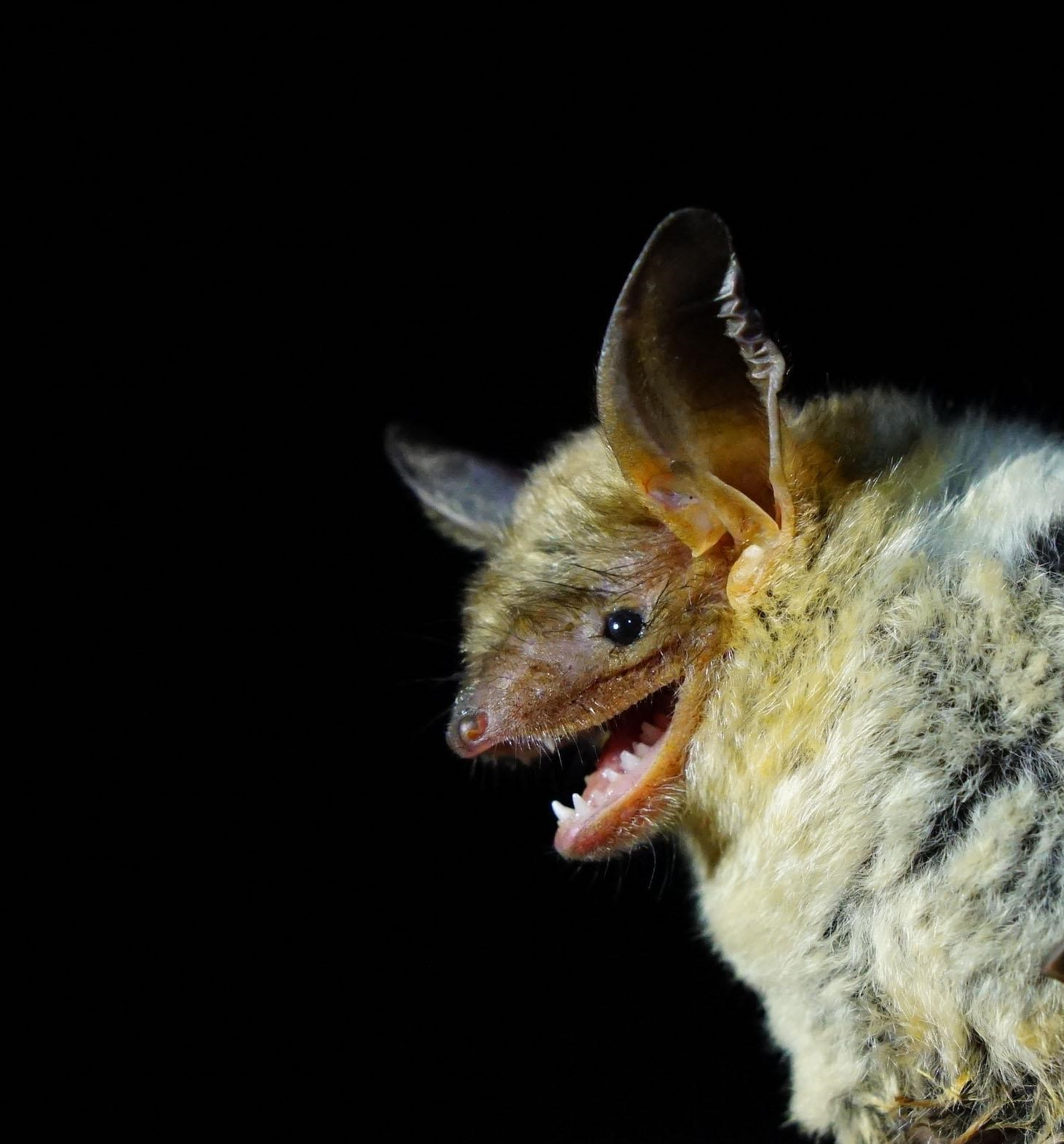
Myotis myotis

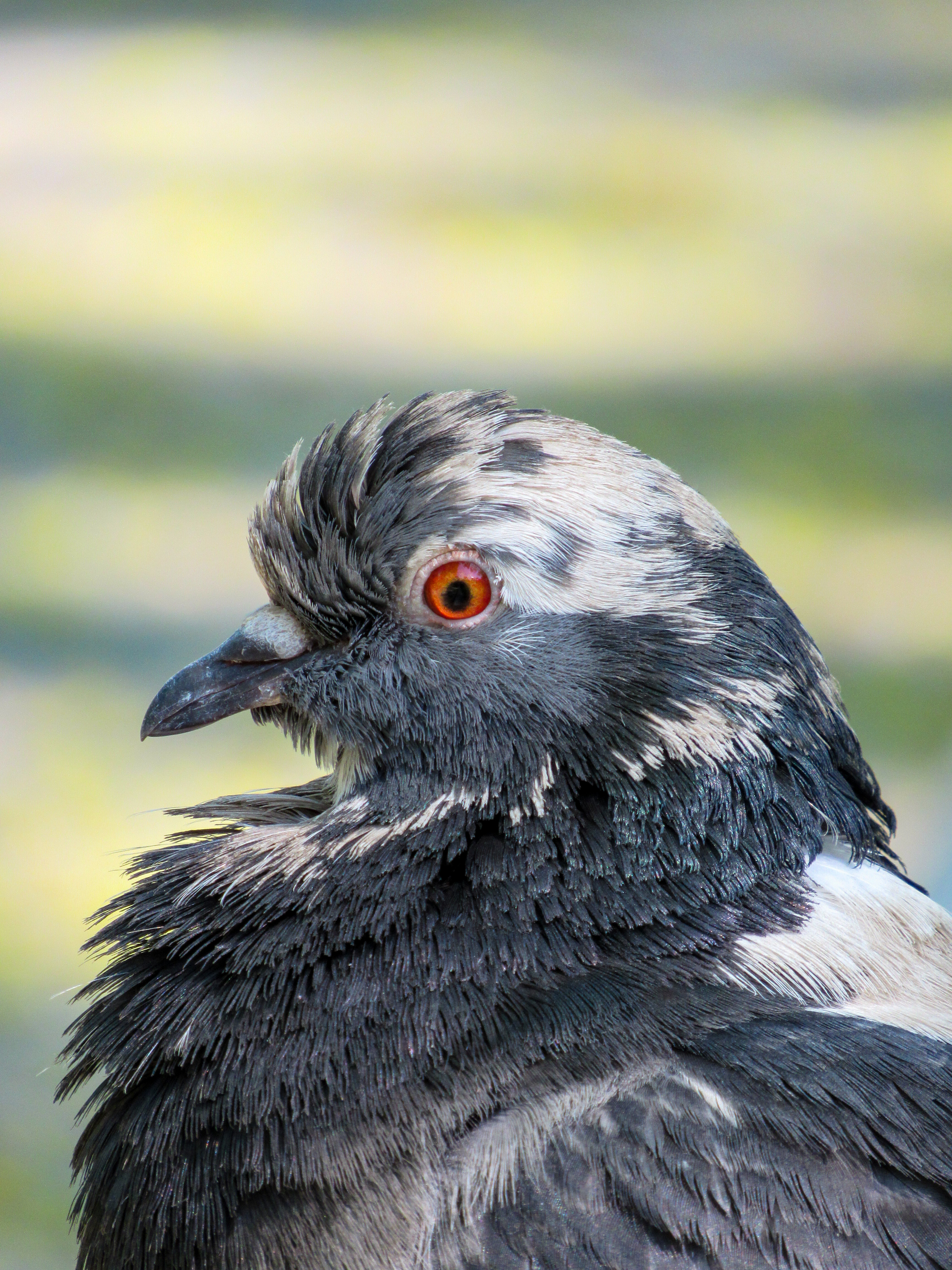
Columba livia

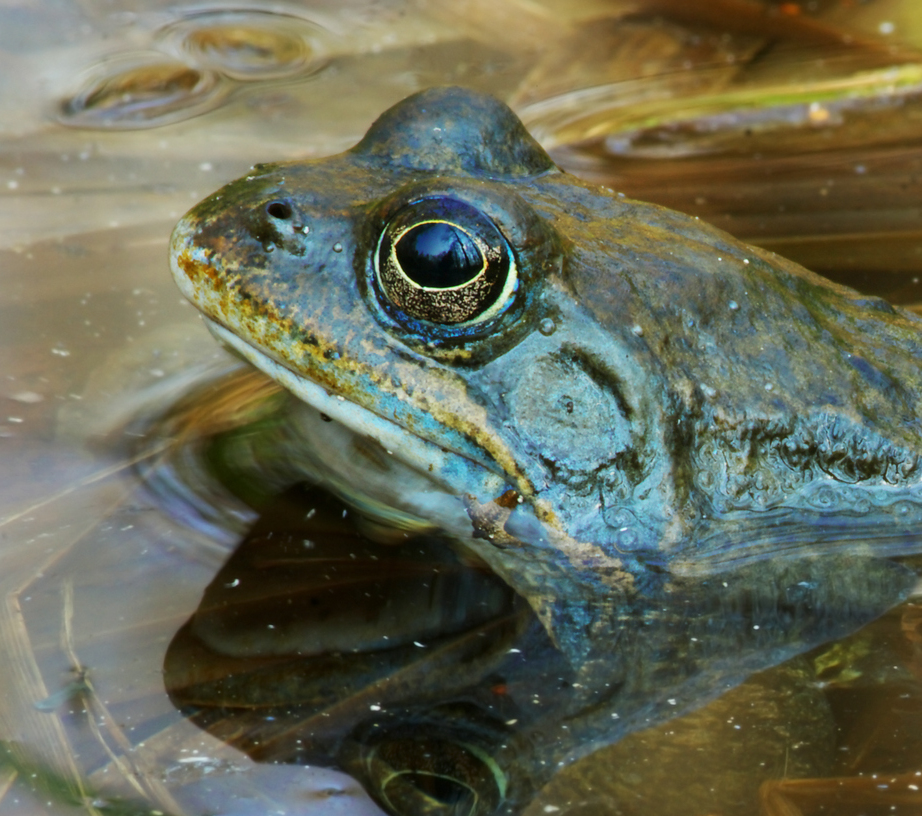
Rana arvalis

== Biology ==
The entrance of the cave is home to one of the largest Taxus baccata populations on Zagrebačka gora, which as of 1998 were mostly bushy or windswept in form, including one in front of and one right next to the entrance, as well as many along the path to the cave. These trees grow as part of the Tilio-Taxetum Glavač 1959 association.

The entrance flora of the cave was studied in 2011.

The cave is a locality for Mesoniscus graniger Frivaldsky, collected by the Croatian Biospeleological Society.

== Selected works ==
=== General ===
- Abramović, B. (1988). "Sesvetske spilje i vrtače". Sesvetske novine. No. 200. p. 10. ISSN 0351-7705.
- Lipin list.
- Poljak, Željko (2008). 50 najljepših planinarskih izleta u Hrvatskoj. ISBN 9789530615205.

=== Paleontology ===
- Malez, Mirko (1974). "Noviji rezultati istraživanja paleolitika u Velikoj pećini, Veternici i Šandalji" [Newer Results of Paleolithic Explorations in Velika pećina, Veternica and Šandalja]. Arheološki radovi i rasprave. 7: 7–44. ISSN 0570-8958.
