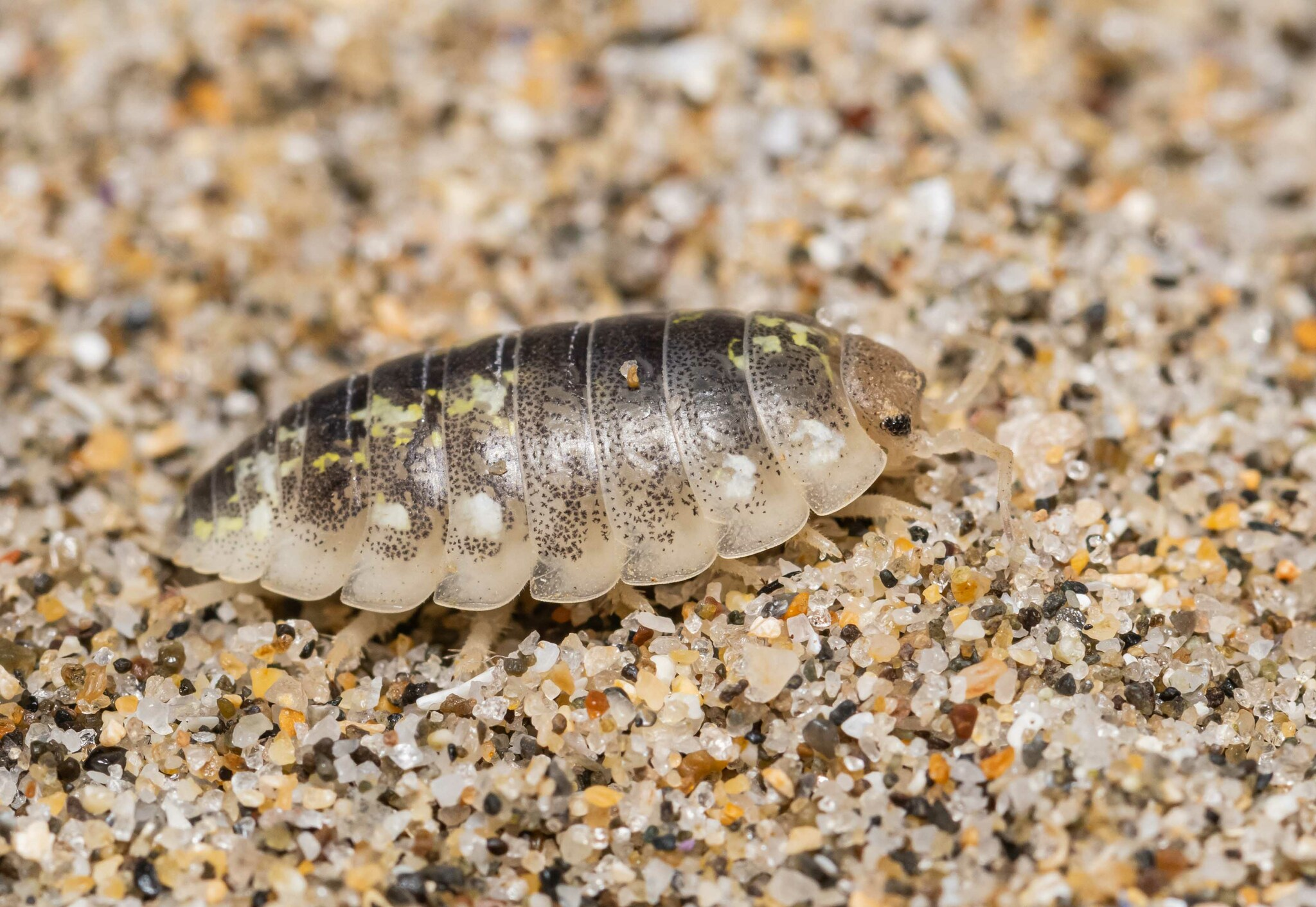

Scientific classification
- Kingdom: Animalia
- Phylum: Arthropoda
- Class: Malacostraca
- Order: Isopoda
- Suborder: Oniscidea
- Family: Alloniscidae
- Genus: Alloniscus
- Species: A. perconvexus

Binomial name
- Alloniscus perconvexus Dana, 1856

= Alloniscus perconvexus =

Species of woodlouse

Alloniscus perconvexus is a species of woodlouse in the family Alloniscidae. It is found in North America.
