= Bioactive terrarium =

Terrarium housing an ecosystem with living plants, animals and micro-organisms

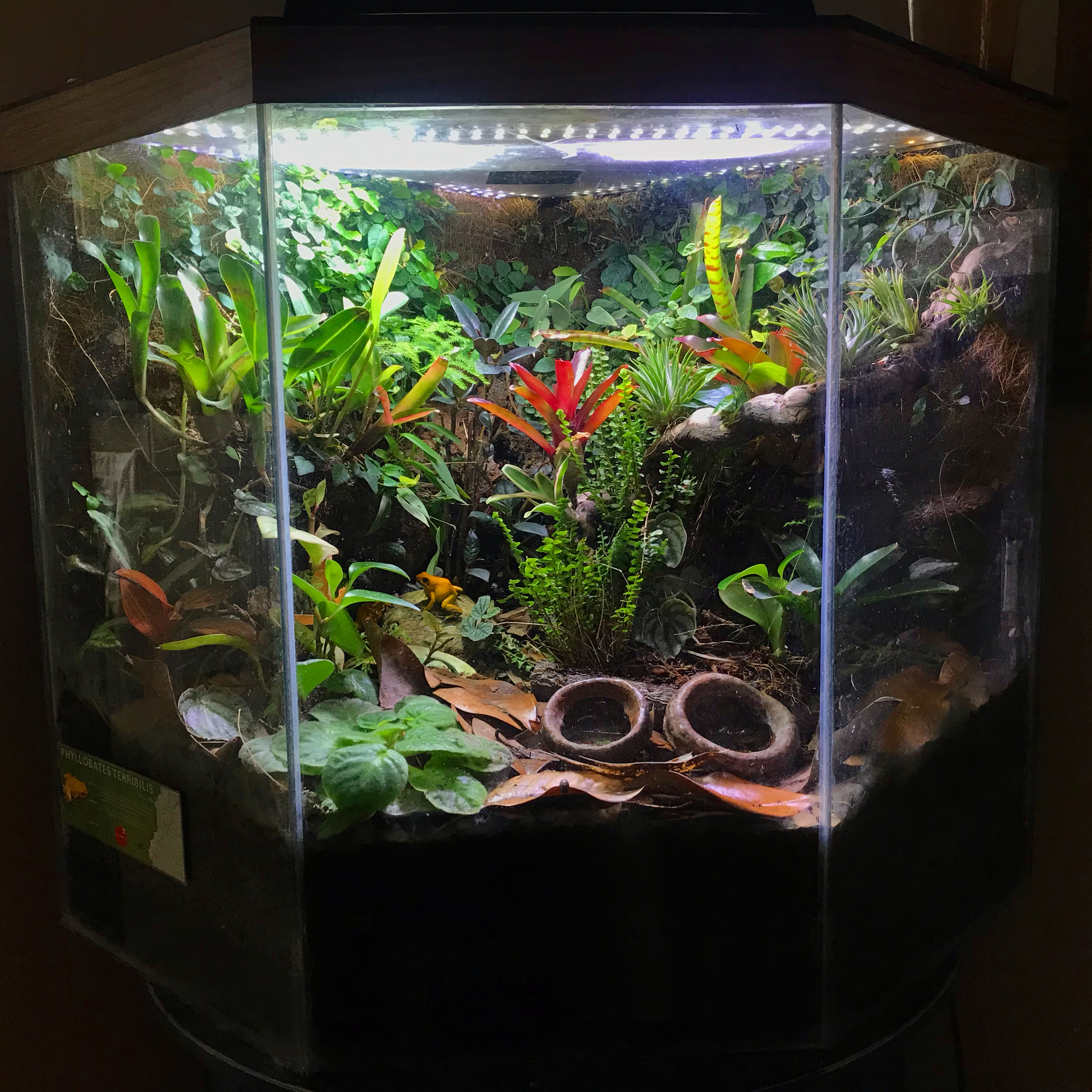
Dart frogs housed in a heavily planted bioactive display terrarium

A bioactive terrarium (or vivarium) is a terrarium for housing one or more terrestrial animal species that includes live plants and populations of small invertebrates and microorganisms to consume and break down the waste products of the primary species. In a functional bioactive terrarium, the waste products will be broken down by these detritivores, reducing or eliminating the need for cage cleaning. Bioactive vivariums are used by zoos and hobbyists to house reptiles and amphibians in an aesthetically pleasing and enriched environment.

== Enclosure ==
Any terrarium can be made bioactive by addition of the appropriate substrate, plants, and detritivores. Bioactive enclosures are often maintained as display terraria constructed of PVC, wood, glass and/or acrylic. Bioactive enclosures in laboratory "rack" style caging are uncommon.

== Cleanup crew ==
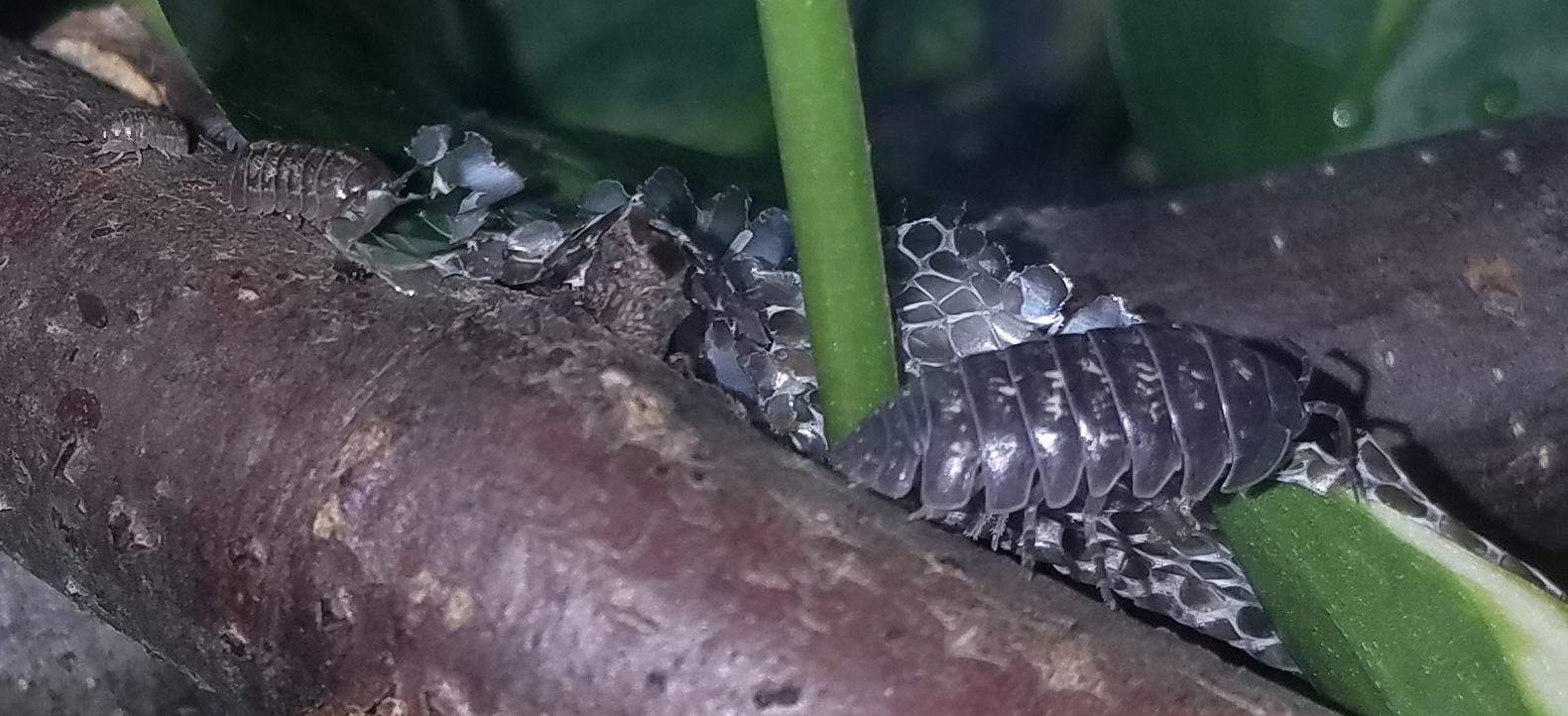
Isopods consuming a snake's shed skin in a bioactive terrarium

Waste products of the primary species are consumed by a variety of detritivores, referred to as the "cleanup crew" by hobbyists. These can include woodlice, springtails, earthworms, millipedes, and various beetles, with different species being preferred in different habitats - the cleanup crew for a tropical rainforest bioactive terrarium may rely primarily on springtails, isopods, and earthworms, while a desert habitat might use beetles. If the primary species is insectivorous, they may consume the cleanup crew, and thus the cleanup crew must have sufficient retreats to avoid being completely depopulated.

Additionally, bioactive terraria typically have a flourishing population of bacteria and other microorganisms which break down the wastes of the cleanup crew and primary species. Fungi may occur as part of the terrarium cycle and will be consumed by the cleanup crew.

== Substrate ==
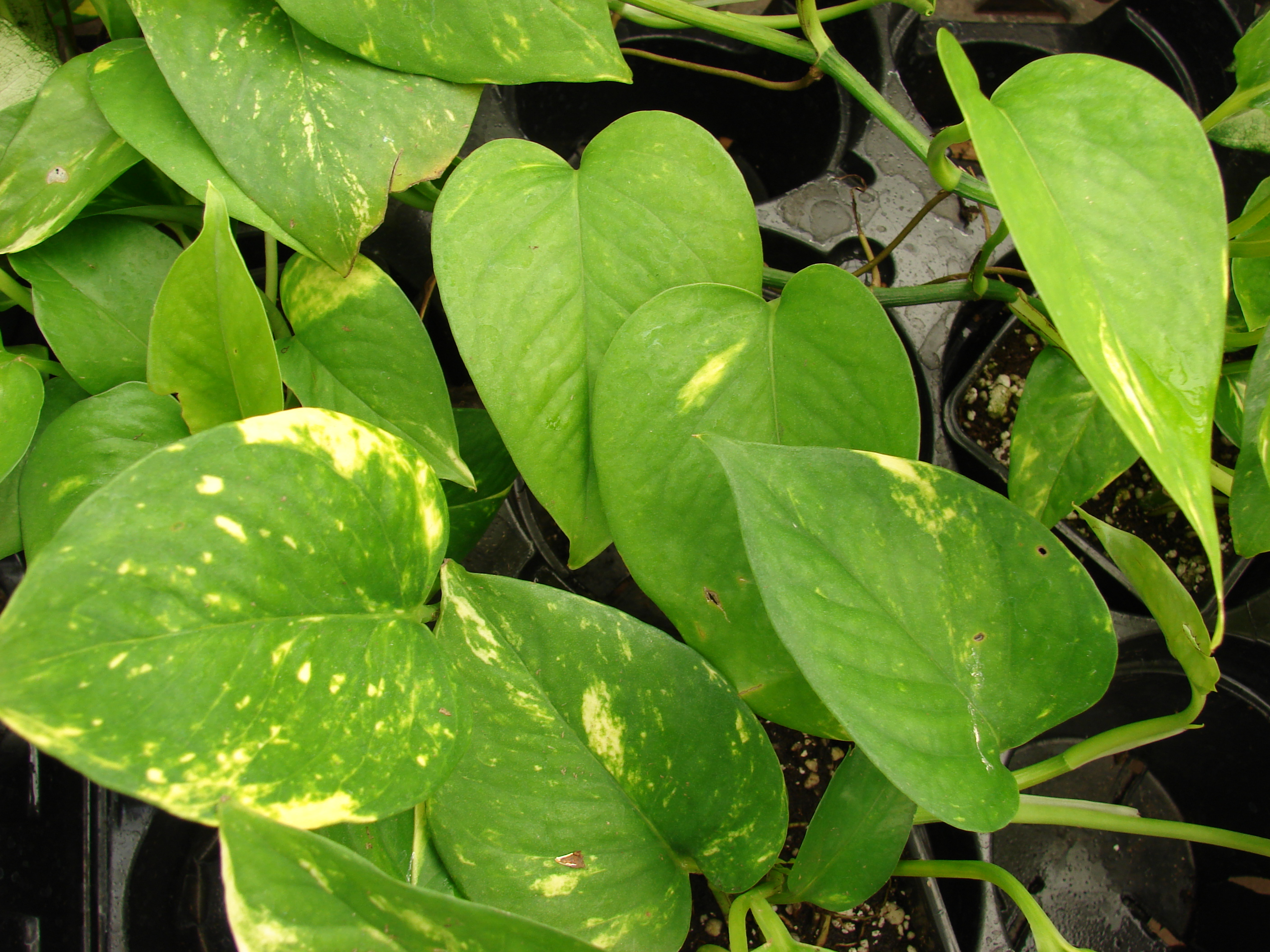
Golden Pothos (Epipremnum aureum) is frequently used in bioactive terrariums due to its hardiness and ability to remove nitrogenous waste

Bioactive enclosures require some form of substrate to grow plants and to provide habitat for the cleanup crew. The choice of substrate is typically determined by the habitat of the primary species (e.g. jungle vs desert), and created by mixing a variety of components such as organic topsoil (free of pesticides and non-biological fertilizers), peat, coco fiber, sand, long-fiber sphagnum moss, cypress mulch, and orchid bark in varying proportions.

In wet habitats, there is typically a drainage layer beneath the substrate to allow water to pool without saturating the substrate. The drainage layer may be constructed via coarse gravel, stones, expanded clay aggregate, or may be wholly synthetic; the drainage layer is typically separated from the overlying substrate with a fine plastic mesh. Additionally, some bioactive terraria include leaf-litter, which can serve as food and microhabitat for the cleanup crew.

== Plants ==
The use of live plants in a bioactive terrarium provides cover for animals inhabiting the enclosure, is aesthetically pleasing in a display enclosure, and can help to absorb nitrogenous wastes that could otherwise build up in a system. Providing a variety of plants that will grow in and be clipped back during maintenance provides hiding spots for terrarium inhabitants that change over time. This is a form of enrichment recommended for keeping reptiles.

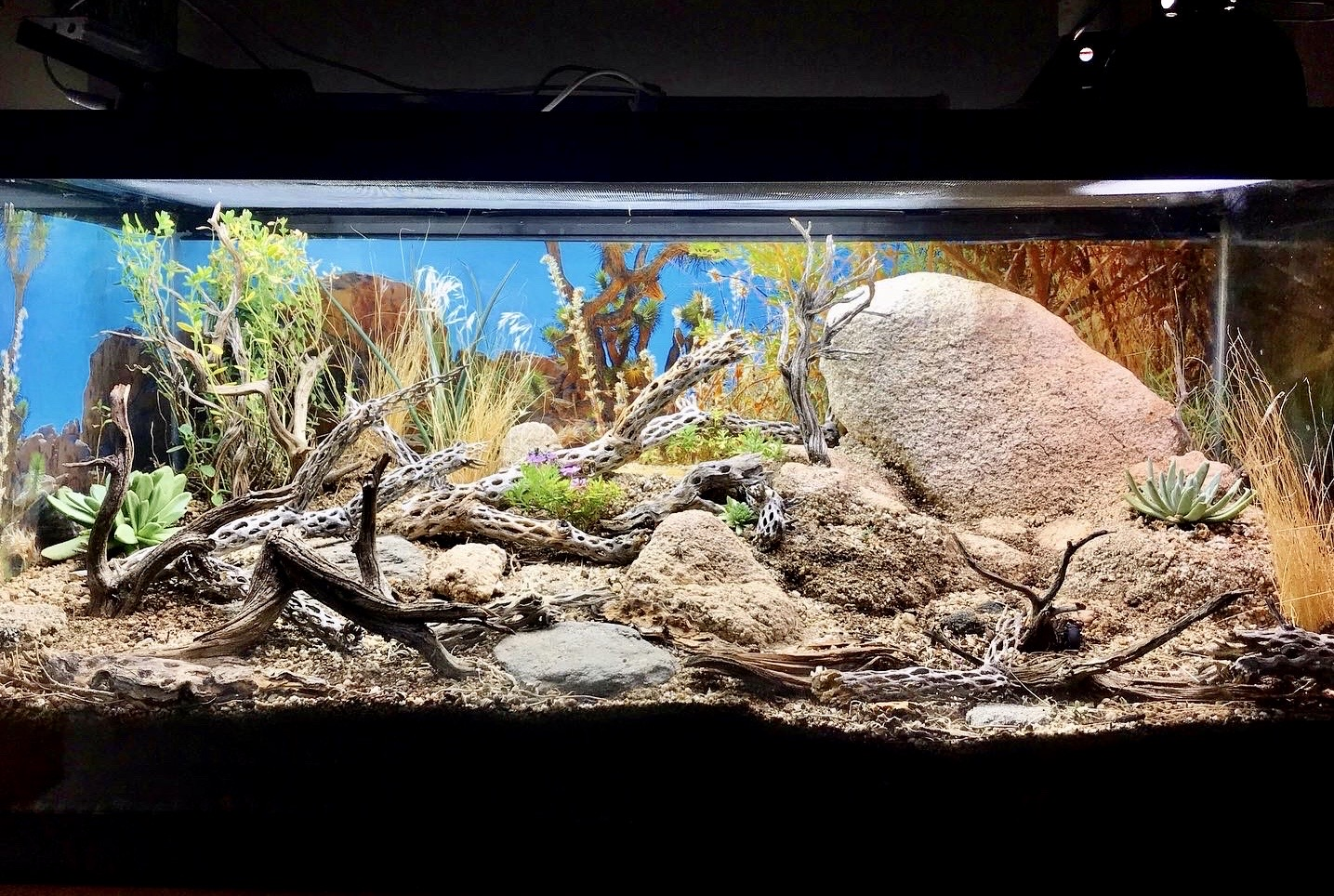
A bioactive arid vivarium for housing leopard geckos
