= Turanoniscus =

Scientific classification
- Kingdom: Animalia
- Phylum: Arthropoda
- Clade: Pancrustacea
- Class: Malacostraca
- Order: Isopoda
- Suborder: Oniscidea
- Family: Turanoniscidae; Borutzky, 1969
- Genus: Turanoniscus; Borutzky, 1969
- Species: T. anacanthotermitis

Binomial name
- Turanoniscus anacanthotermitis Borutzky, 1969

Genus of crustaceans

Turanoniscus is a monotypic genus of isopods belonging to the monotypic family Turanoniscidae. The only species is Turanoniscus anacanthotermitis. The species, genus, and family were described in 1969 by Russian zoologist Evgenii Vladimirovich Borutzky.
