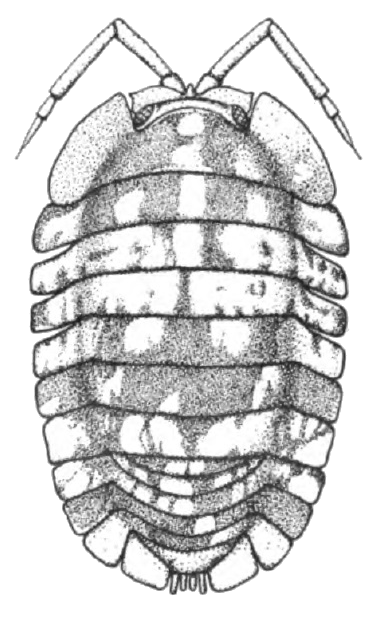
- Illustration of Adinda dollfusi

Scientific classification
- Domain: Eukaryota
- Kingdom: Animalia
- Phylum: Arthropoda
- Class: Malacostraca
- Order: Isopoda
- Suborder: Oniscidea
- Family: Eubelidae; Budde-Lund, 1899

= Eubelidae =

Family of crustaceans

Eubelidae is a family of woodlice. Its members are mostly distributed in African tropical forests, and partially throughout South-East Asia and the Arabian Peninsula.

== Genera ==
Eubelidae contains the following genera:

- Aethiopopactes Ferrara & Taiti, 1982
- Ambounia Dollfus, 1895
- Angaribia Barnard, 1932
- Ankaratridium Paulian de Félice, 1950
- Aschismatius Verhoeff, 1942
- Atracheodillo Arcangeli, 1950
- Benechinus Budde-Lund, 1910
- Congethelum Ferrara & Schmalfuss, 1985
- Dioscoridillo Ferrara & Taiti, 1996
- Elumoides Taiti & Ferrara, 1983
- Ethelum Budde-Lund, 1899
- Ethelumoides Ferrara & Taiti, 1989
- Eubelinum Taiti, 2014
- Eubelum Budde-Lund, 1885
- Gelsana Budde-Lund, 1910
- Hiallelgon Paulian de Félice, 1945
- Hiallides Richardson, 1909
- Hiallum Budde-Lund, 1899
- Ignamba Budde-Lund, 1910
- Kameruthelum Verhoeff, 1942
- Kenyoniscus Schmölzer, 1974
- Kivudillo Ferrara & Taiti, 1976
- Koweitoniscus Vandel, 1975
- Lobethelum Ferrara & Taiti, 1989
- Mesarmadillo Dollfus, 1892
- Metaperiscyphops Ferrara & Schmalfuss, 1976
- Microcercus Budde-Lund, 1910
- Myrmecethelum Verhoeff, 1942
- Omanodillo Taiti, Ferrara & Davolos, 2000
- Oropactes Ferrara & Taiti, 1982
- Orothelum Paoli, Ferrara & Taiti, 2002
- Panningillo Verhoeff, 1942
- Paraperiscyphops Ferrara & Schmalfuss, 1976
- Parelumoides Ferrara & Schmalfuss, 1983
- Periscyphis Gerstaecker, 1873
- Periscyphoides Arcangeli, 1950
- Periscyphops Hilgendorf, 1893
- Pseudoaethiopopactes Ferrara, 1974
- Rufuta Taiti & Ferrara, 1981
- Saidjahus Budde-Lund, 1904
- Schoutedenillo Arcangeli, 1950
- Somalodillo Taiti & Ferrara, 1982
- Somalodilloides Taiti & Ferrara, 2004
- Somaloniscus Ferrara & Taiti, 1996
- Stegosauroniscus Schmölzer, 1974
- Synarmadilloides Nobili, 1906
- Tritracheodillo Ferrara & Taiti, 1982
- Trogleubelum Arcangeli, 1950
- Tropethelum Verhoeff, 1942
- Xeroniscus Ferrara & Taiti, 1990
