= Schoeblia =

Scientific classification
- Kingdom: Animalia
- Phylum: Arthropoda
- Clade: Pancrustacea
- Class: Malacostraca
- Order: Isopoda
- Suborder: Oniscidea
- Family: Schoebliidae; Verhoeff, 1938
- Genus: Schoeblia; Budde-Lund, 1909

Type species
- Schoeblia circularis Budde-Lund, 1909

Species
- S. circularis Budde-Lund, 1909; S. fulleri (Silvestri, 1918)

Synonyms
- Schöblia Budde-Lund, 1909; Termitoniscus Silvestri, 1918

Genus of crustaceans

Schoeblia is a genus of isopods belonging to the monotypic family Schoebliidae. The genus was described by Danish zoologist Gustav Budde-Lund in 1909 with Schoeblia circularis as the type species.

== Species ==
This genus includes the following species:

- Schoeblia circularis Budde-Lund, 1909
- Schoeblia fulleri (Silvestri, 1918)
