= Balloniscidae =

Scientific classification
- Domain: Eukaryota
- Kingdom: Animalia
- Phylum: Arthropoda
- Class: Malacostraca
- Order: Isopoda
- Suborder: Oniscidea
- Family: Balloniscidae

Family of crustaceans

Balloniscidae is a family of crustaceans belonging to the order Isopoda.

Genera:

- Balloniscus Budde-Lund, 1908
- Plataoniscus Leistikow, 2001
- Plataoniscus Vandel, 1963
