= Berytoniscus =

Scientific classification
- Kingdom: Animalia
- Phylum: Arthropoda
- Class: Malacostraca
- Order: Isopoda
- Suborder: Oniscidea
- Section: Crinocheta
- Family: Berytoniscidae
- Genus: Berytoniscus; Vandel, 1955
- Species: B. singularis

Binomial name
- Berytoniscus singularis Vandel, 1955

Genus of crustaceans

Berytoniscus is a monotypic genus of crustaceans belonging to the monotypic family Berytoniscidae. The only species is Berytoniscus singularis.
