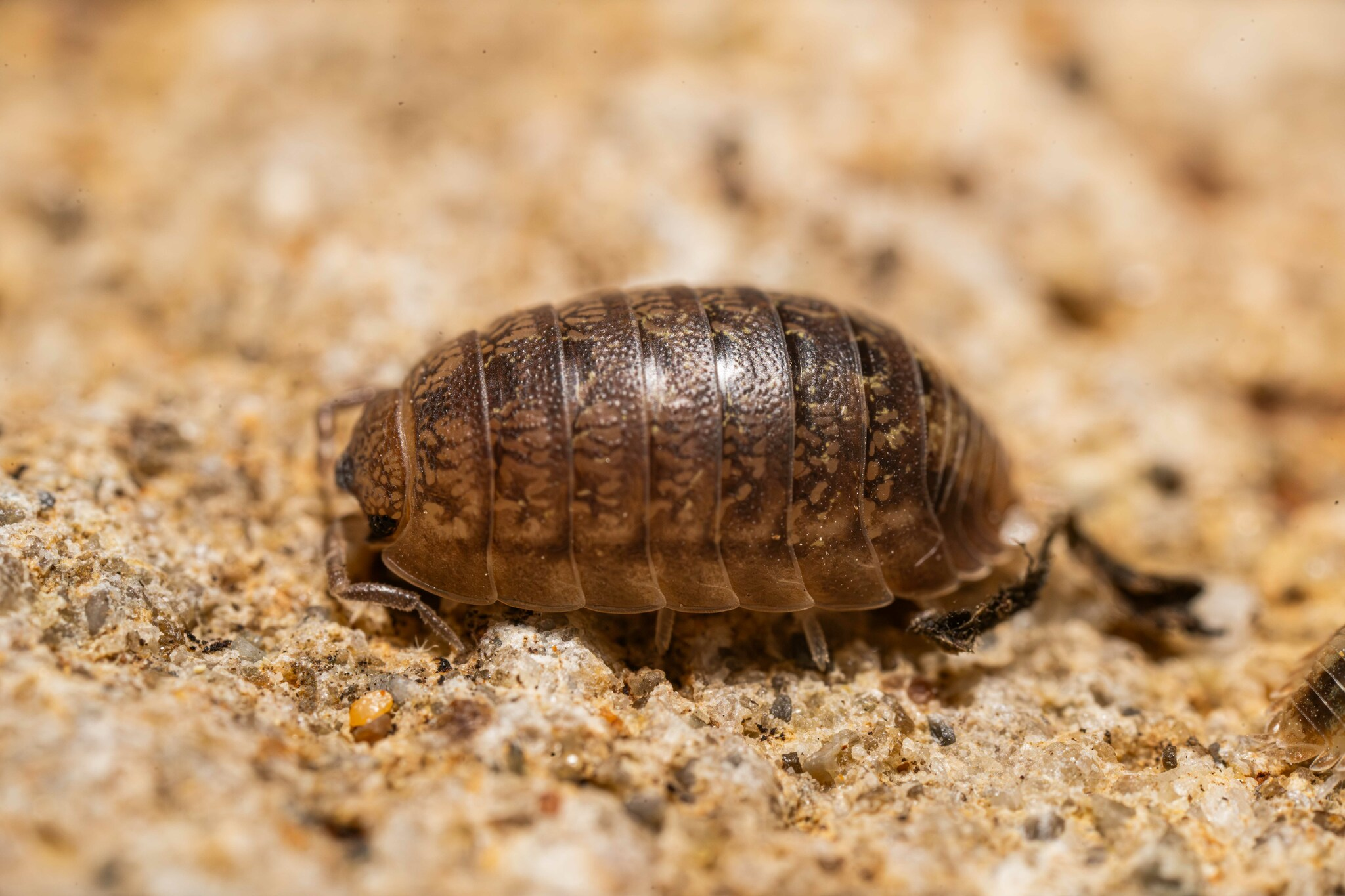
- Alloniscus mirabilis

Scientific classification
- Kingdom: Animalia
- Phylum: Arthropoda
- Class: Malacostraca
- Order: Isopoda
- Suborder: Oniscidea
- Family: Alloniscidae; Schmidt, 2003
- Genus: Alloniscus; Dana, 1854

= Alloniscus =

Genus of woodlice

Alloniscus is the sole genus in the woodlice family Alloniscidae. There are more than 20 described species in Alloniscus.

== Species ==
These 23 species belong to the genus Alloniscus:

- Alloniscus allspachi Nunomura, 2001
- Alloniscus balssii (Verhoeff, 1928)
- Alloniscus boninensis Nunomura, 1984
- Alloniscus gerardi Arcangeli, 1960
- Alloniscus maculatus Nunomura, 1984
- Alloniscus marinus Collinge, 1920
- Alloniscus mirabilis (Stuxberg, 1875)
- Alloniscus nacreus Collinge, 1922
- Alloniscus nicobaricus Budde-Lund, 1885
- Alloniscus oahuensis Budde-Lund, 1885
- Alloniscus pallidulus (Budde-Lund, 1885)
- Alloniscus pardii Arcangeli, 1960
- Alloniscus perconvexus Dana, 1856
- Alloniscus pigmentatus Budde-Lund, 1885
- Alloniscus porcellioides Budde-Lund, 1904
- Alloniscus priolensis Arcangeli, 1960
- Alloniscus robustus Ferrara, 1974
- Alloniscus ryukyuensis Nunomura, 1984
- Alloniscus saipanensis Nunomura, 2001
- Alloniscus salinarum Vandel, 1968
- Alloniscus schadleri Arcangeli, 1960
- Alloniscus silvestrii Arcangeli, 1960
- Alloniscus thalassophilus Rioja, 1964
