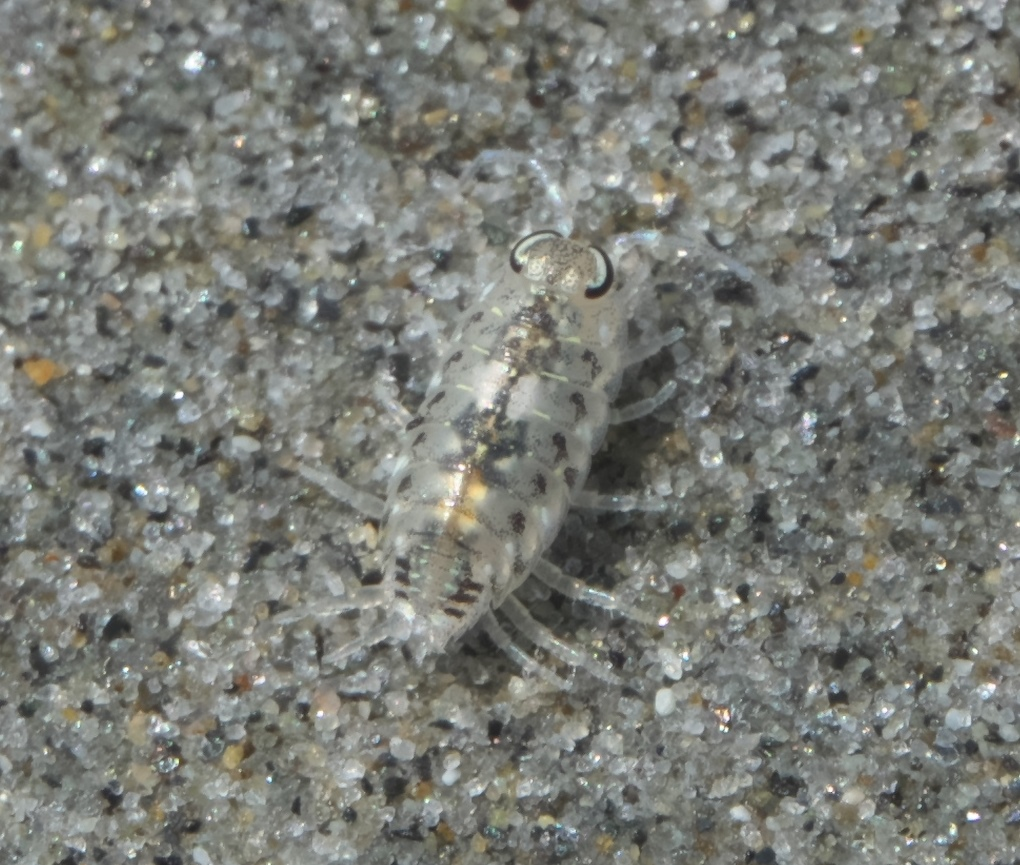
- Scyphax ornatus, New Zealand

Scientific classification
- Kingdom: Animalia
- Phylum: Arthropoda
- Clade: Pancrustacea
- Class: Malacostraca
- Order: Isopoda
- Suborder: Oniscidea
- Parvorder: Orthogonopoda
- Section: Crinocheta
- Family: Scyphacidae; Dana, 1853

Type genus
- Scyphax Dana, 1853

Synonyms
- Scyphacinae Dana, 1853; Actaeciidae Vandel, 1964

= Scyphacidae =

Family of woodlice

Scyphacidae is a family of woodlice in the order Isopoda. It contains 6 genera and about 20 described species in Scyphacidae.

== Genera ==
These six genera belong to the family Scyphacidae:

- Actaecia Dana, 1853
- Marioniscus Barnard, 1932
- Quelpartoniscus Kwon, 1995
- Scyphacella Smith, 1873
- Scyphax Dana, 1853
- Scyphoniscus Chilton, 1901

== Taxonomy ==
The genus Scyphoniscus was moved by Schmidt (2002) from Scyphacidae to Detonidae, and this combination was reflected in a catalogue by Schmalfuss (2003). However, in a more recent paper (Schmidt & Leistikow 2004: Catalogue of genera of the terrestrial Isopoda. - Steentstrupia 28: 1-118) the genus was included again in Scyphacidae.
