= Tendosphaeridae =

Scientific classification
- Domain: Eukaryota
- Kingdom: Animalia
- Phylum: Arthropoda
- Class: Malacostraca
- Order: Isopoda
- Suborder: Oniscidea
- Family: Tendosphaeridae

Family of crustaceans

Tendosphaeridae is a family of crustaceans belonging to the order Isopoda.

Genera:

- Macrotelsonia Arcangeli, 1939
- Tendosphaera Verhoeff, 1930
- Thrakosphaera Schmalfuss, 1998
