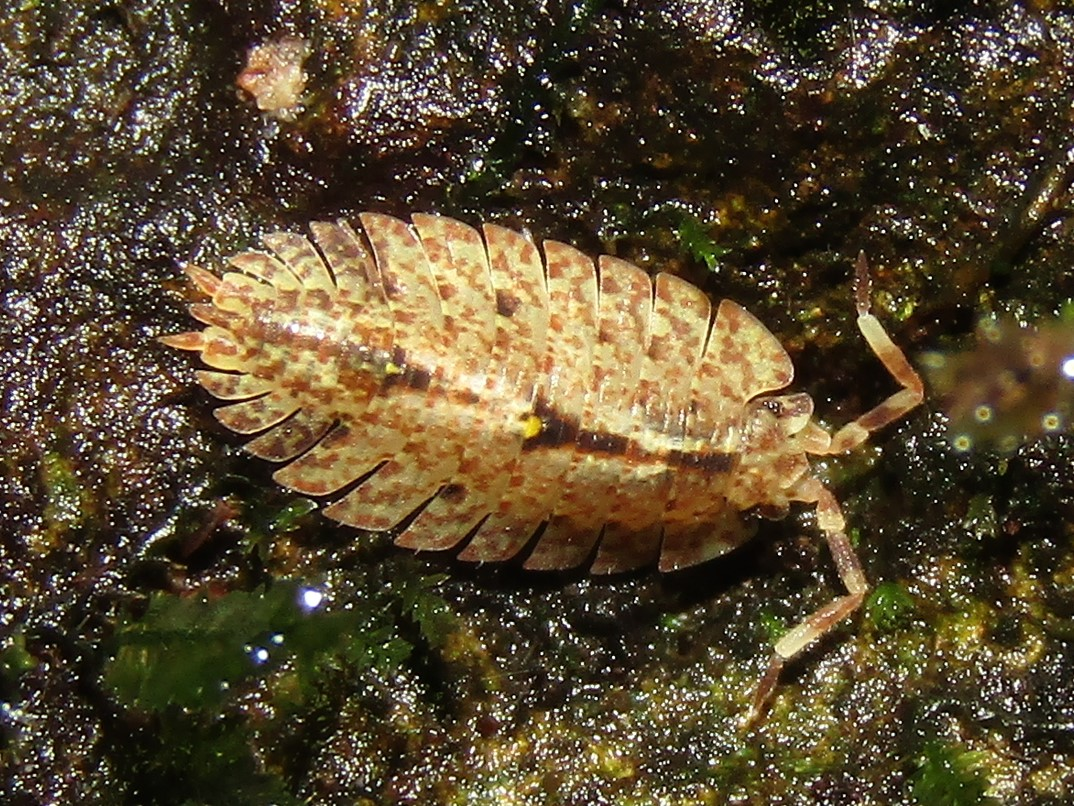
- Monitus sp.

Scientific classification
- Domain: Eukaryota
- Kingdom: Animalia
- Phylum: Arthropoda
- Class: Malacostraca
- Order: Isopoda
- Suborder: Oniscidea
- Family: Bathytropidae; Vandel, 1952

= Bathytropidae =

Family of crustaceans

Bathytropidae is a family of crustaceans belonging to the order Isopoda.

Genera:

- Australoniscus Vandel, 1973
- Bathytropa Budde-Lund, 1885
- Cubanoscia Vandel, 1981
- Dumetoniscus Taiti & Checcucci, 2009
- Laninoniscus Reca, 1973
- Monitus Lewis, 1998
- Myrmekiocellio Verhoeff, 1936
- Neotroponiscus Arcangeli, 1936
- Rhabdoniscus Vandel, 1981
