= Spelaeoniscidae =

Scientific classification
- Kingdom: Animalia
- Phylum: Arthropoda
- Clade: Pancrustacea
- Class: Malacostraca
- Order: Isopoda
- Suborder: Oniscidea
- Family: Spelaeoniscidae

Synonyms
- Speleoniscidae

Family of crustaceans

Spelaeoniscidae is a family of crustaceans belonging to the order Isopoda.

== Genera ==
Genera:

- Albertosphoera Caruso & Lombardo, 1983
- Atlantoniscus Vandel, 1959
- Barbarosphaera Vandel, 1948
