= Olibrinidae =

Scientific classification
- Domain: Eukaryota
- Kingdom: Animalia
- Phylum: Arthropoda
- Class: Malacostraca
- Order: Isopoda
- Suborder: Oniscidea
- Family: Olibrinidae

Family of crustaceans

Olibrinidae is a family of crustaceans belonging to the order Isopoda.

Genera:

- Adoniscus Vandel, 1955
- Namboniscus Schmidt, 2001
- Namiboniscus Schmidt, 2001
- Olibrinus Budde-Lund, 1913
- Palaeolibrinus Broly, 2018
- Paradoniscus Taiti & Ferrara, 2004
