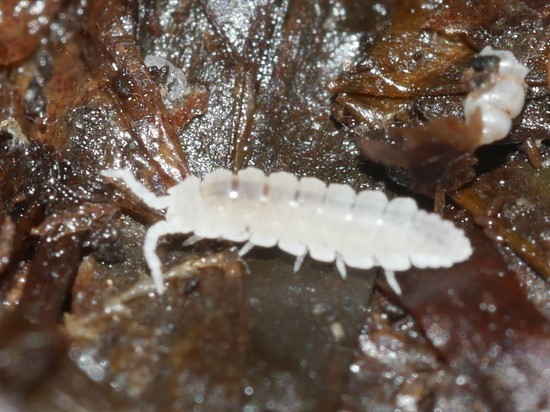
- Stenoniscus nestori

Scientific classification
- Kingdom: Animalia
- Phylum: Arthropoda
- Class: Malacostraca
- Order: Isopoda
- Suborder: Oniscidea
- Family: Stenoniscidae; Budde-Lund, 1904

= Stenoniscidae =

Family of crustaceans

Stenoniscidae is a family of crustaceans belonging to the order Isopoda.

Genera:

- Archeostenoniscus Broly, 2018
- Metastenoniscus Taiti & Ferrara, 1982
- Stenoniscus Aubert & Dollfus, 1890
