= Pudeoniscidae =

Scientific classification
- Kingdom: Animalia
- Phylum: Arthropoda
- Clade: Pancrustacea
- Class: Malacostraca
- Order: Isopoda
- Suborder: Oniscidea
- Family: Pudeoniscidae; Lemos de Castro, 1973

Family of woodlice

Pudeoniscidae is a family of malacostracans in the order Isopoda.

== Genera ==
- Brasiloniscus Lemos de Castro, 1973
- Iansaoniscus Campos-Filho, Bichuette, Montesanto, Araujo & Taiti, 2017
- Oxossioniscus Campos-Filho, Lisboa & Cardoso, 2018
- Pudeoniscus Vandel, 1963
