= Rhyscotidae =

Scientific classification
- Kingdom: Animalia
- Phylum: Arthropoda
- Clade: Pancrustacea
- Class: Malacostraca
- Order: Isopoda
- Suborder: Oniscidea
- Family: Rhyscotidae; Budde-Lund, 1908

Genera
- Rhyscotoides; Rhyscotus

Family of woodlice

Rhyscotidae is a family of terrestrial isopod crustaceans containing two genera.

== Description ==
Members of Rhyscotidae have multiple unique traits, including hermaphroditism, an inflated frons, modified mouthparts, and a fixed number of long stick-like marsupial larvae.
