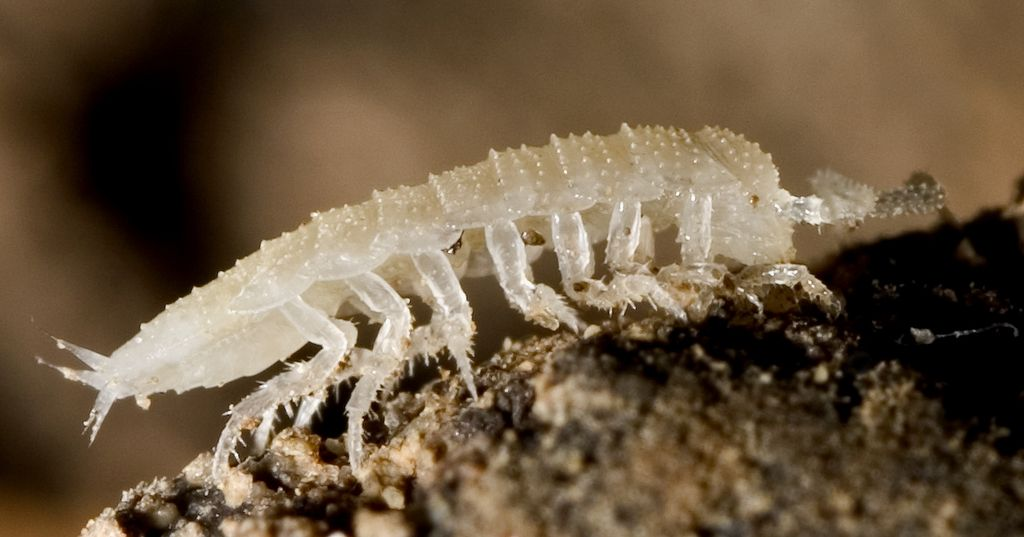
- Mesoniscus graniger

Scientific classification
- Kingdom: Animalia
- Phylum: Arthropoda
- Clade: Pancrustacea
- Class: Malacostraca
- Order: Isopoda
- Suborder: Oniscidea
- Section: Microcheta; Schmalfuss, 1989
- Family: Mesoniscidae; Verhoeff, 1908
- Genus: Mesoniscus; Carl, 1906

Species
- Mesoniscus alpicolus (Heller, 1858); Mesoniscus graniger (Frivaldsky, 1865)

= Mesoniscus =

Genus of woodlice

Mesoniscus is a genus of woodlice, placed in its own family, Mesoniscidae, and section, Microcheta. It contains two species – Mesoniscus alpicolus and Mesoniscus graniger – that live in Central and Eastern Europe, mostly in and around caves.

== Distribution ==
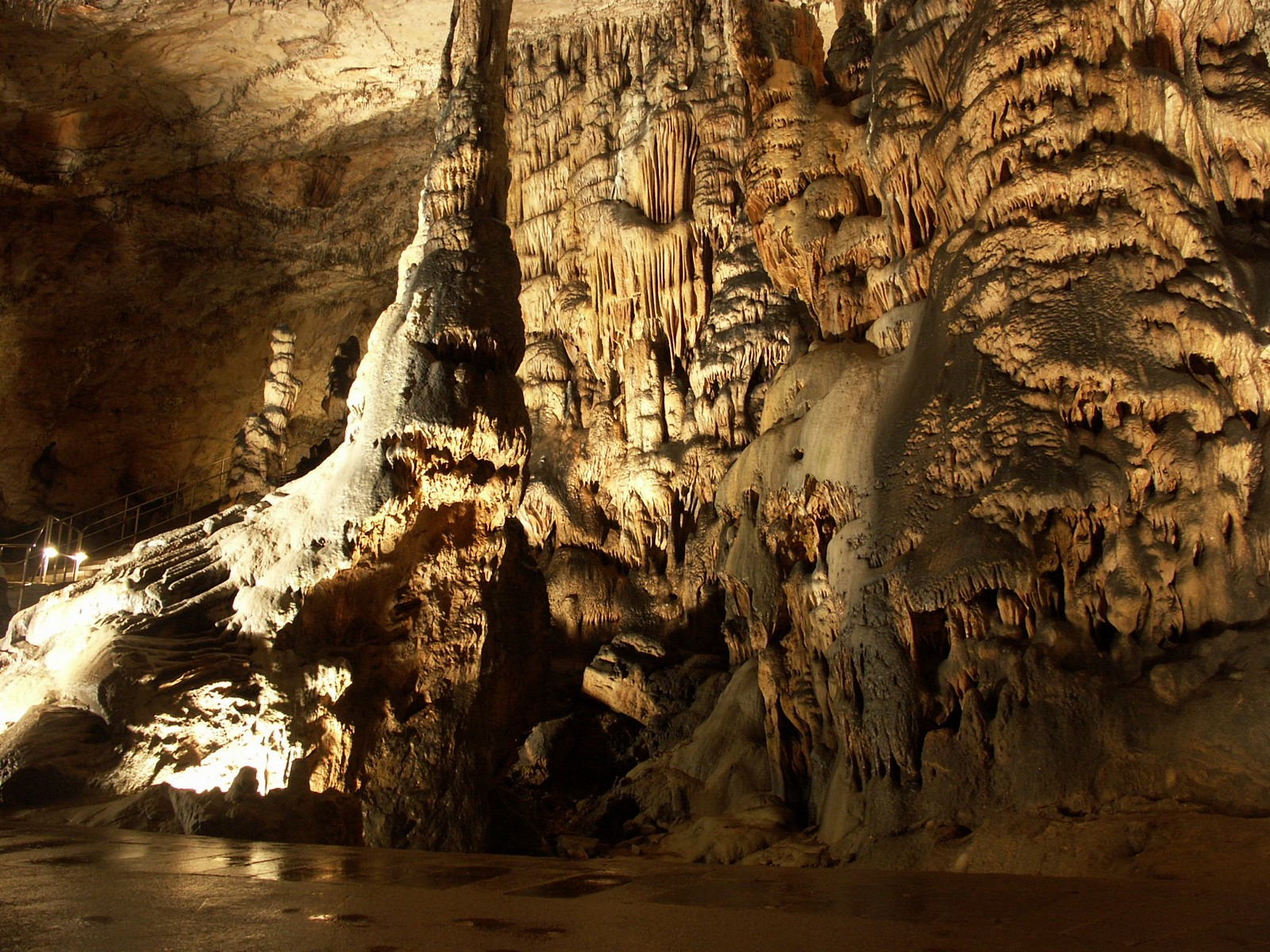
The Baradla cave in north-eastern Hungary is home to a population of Mesoniscus graniger.

Mesoniscus is restricted to Central Europe and the Balkan Peninsula; the ranges of its two species do not overlap.

Mesoniscus alpicolus is found in Lombardy and the Northern Calcareous Alps. In Austria, its range extends from the Karwendel near Innsbruck to the eastern edge of the Wienerwald, although it is also found in isolated pockets of Triassic and Silurian–Devonian limestone in Styria.

Mesoniscus graniger has a wider distribution than its congener; it is found in much of the Carpathians, including the Bihor and Banat mountains, and in the Dinaric Alps and Julian Alps. It is also found in the Caves of Aggtelek Karst in Hungary.

== Taxonomy ==
The first description of a woodlouse now in the genus Mesoniscus was in 1858, when Camill Heller described "Titanethes alpicolus" in 1858. This was followed in 1865 by the description by János Frivaldszky (Ján Frivaldský) of the subspecies "Titanethes alpicolus graniger".

Mesoniscus is the only genus in the family Mesoniscidae, and is considered so distinct from other woodlice that the family is placed in a separate section, named Microcheta.

== Ecology ==
Mesoniscus species lack the pleopodal lungs found in many other woodlice, and are restricted to damp environments. Their bodies are small and fragile relative to the average terrestrial woodlice, and they lack eyes. The damp cave environments in which they are found are at a constant low temperature of around 10 °C (50 °F).
