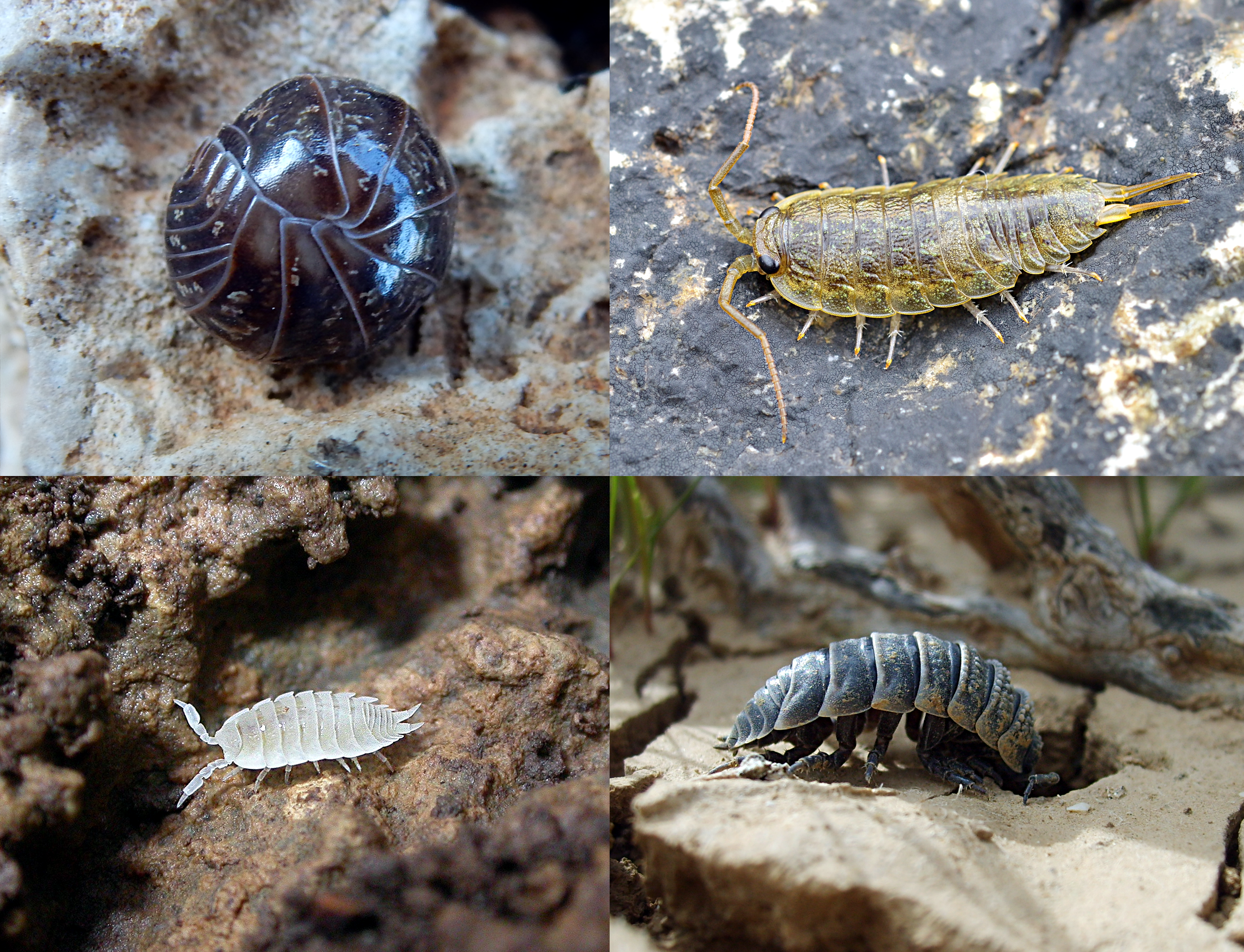
- Clockwise from top left: Schizidium tiberianum, Ligia oceanica, Hemilepistus reaumuri, and Platyarthrus hoffmannseggii

Scientific classification
- Kingdom: Animalia
- Phylum: Arthropoda
- Clade: Pancrustacea
- Class: Malacostraca
- Order: Isopoda
- Suborder: Oniscidea; Latreille, 1802

Sections
- Diplocheta; Tylida; Microcheta; Synocheta; Crinocheta

= Woodlouse =

Woodlice Temporal range: Cretaceous – present, 113–0 Ma Suggested late Paleozoic origin based on molecular clock

Suborder of terrestrial isopods

Woodlice, also known as slaters, sowbugs and roly-polys, are terrestrial isopods in the suborder Oniscidea. Their name is derived from being often found in old wood, and from louse, a parasitic insect, although woodlice are neither parasitic nor insects. They have an abundance of regional names common names due to their familiarity.

Woodlice are suggested to have colonised land during the late Paleozoic based on molecular clock analysis, though the oldest known fossils are from the mid-Cretaceous period around 100 million years ago.

Woodlice have many common names and although often referred to as terrestrial isopods, some species live in semiaquatic environments like those of the genus Ligia. Woodlice in the families Armadillidae, Armadillidiidae, Eubelidae, Tylidae and some other genera can roll up into a roughly spherical shape (conglobate) as a defensive mechanism or to conserve moisture; others have partial rolling ability, but most cannot conglobate at all.

Woodlice are primarily detritivorous, and are a major contributor to the humification process by breaking down litter via ingestion. By reingesting their own faeces (coprophagy) they gain more nutrients from poor-quality leaf litter and increase the rate at which plant debris are transformed in humus.

Woodlice have a basic morphology of a segmented, dorso-ventrally flattened body with seven pairs of jointed legs, and have some or all five pairs of their pleopods (swimming legs) adapted for respiration. Like other peracarids, female woodlice carry fertilised eggs in their marsupium, through which they provide developing embryos with water, oxygen and nutrients. The immature young hatch as mancae and receive further maternal care in some species. Juveniles then go through a series of moults before reaching maturity. Mancae are born with six pereon (thoracic) segments and gain an additional one after their first moult.

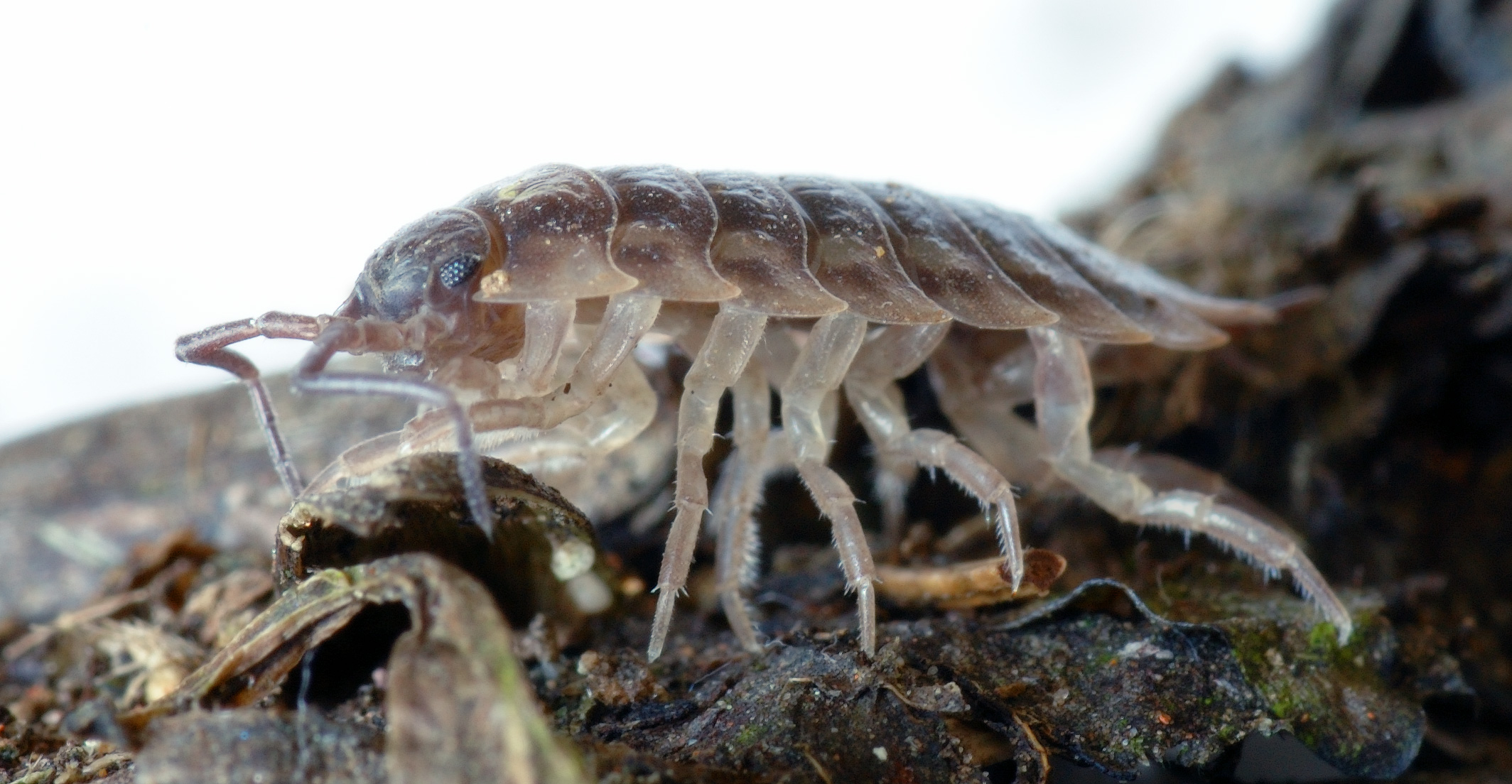
The woodlouse Oniscus asellus showing the head with eyes and antennae, carapace and relatively uniform limbs

Key adaptations to terrestrial life have led to a highly diverse set of animals. From the marine littoral zone and subterranean lakes to arid deserts and desert slopes 4,725 m (15,500 ft) above sea-level, woodlice can be found in every continent other than Antarctica, in almost all kinds of terrestrial and coastal habitats, being absent only from polar regions and very high altitudes. Due to the permeability of their exoskeletons, woodlice are susceptible to water loss and can often be found beneath surfaces such as the underside of logs and rocks to avoid desiccation under sunlight.

Woodlice are widely studied in the contexts of evolutionary biology, behavioural ecology, and nutrient cycling. They are popular as pets often favoured because of their varied colour and texture forms, ease of care, or for the purpose of serving as a terrarium cleanup crew.

== Biology ==
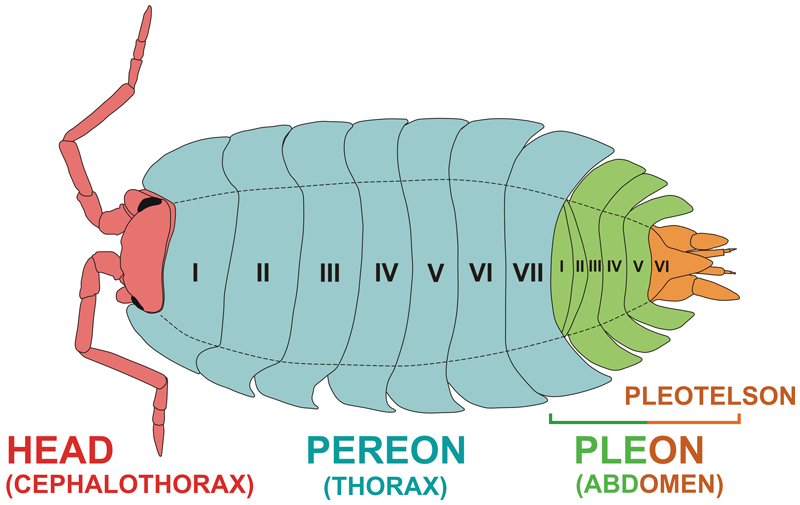
Basic body regions of the woodlouse

=== Description ===
Most woodlouse are between 1.2-30 mm in length, their shape taking a generally flattened appearance. Their basic morphology can be divided into the head, pereon (thorax), and pleon (abdomen) sections. The head bears flagellate antennae. The pereon is constituted by seven segments of chitinous cuticle, each segment bears a pair of legs, making fourteen legs in total. The pleon is constitued by five segments, beneath each pleon is a pleopod which may bear pseudo-trachea through which the woodlouse breathes, the number of pseudo-trachea varying by species.

The woodlouse has a shell-like exoskeleton, which it must progressively shed as it grows. The moult takes place in two stages: the back half is lost first, followed a few days later by the front, so that moulting individuals have a curious appearance. This method of moulting is different from that of most arthropods, which shed their cuticle in a single process. It is postulated that maintaining partial mobility make woodlice less vulnerable to predators during ecdysis, and that biphasic moult favours calcium conservation in a terrestrial environment where calcium availability is limited compared to marine habitats.

Woodlice are susceptible to water loss, with evaporation occurring from the cuticle at a high rate, as a result they have developed morphological, physiological, and behavioural traits to avoid desiccation.

A close up video showing Porcellio scaber moving and using its antennae to feel the environment, at the end of the video the woodlouse retreats into a crevice

Woodlice are attracted to small narrow places such as crevices or the underside of rocks in order to minimise water loss, likewise they are repulsed by bright light to avoid desiccation under sunlight.

Antennae are used to help feel the environment to aid in navigation, and also allow the woodlouse to detect chemical odours which may identify predators; mechanoreceptors, hygroreceptors, and chemoreceptors on the antennae and cuticle enable the woodlouse to detect small changes in the texture of a surface they encounter as well as the presence of chemical odours.

They are usually nocturnal and are detritivores, feeding mostly on dead plant matter, preferring partially decayed or broken down material such as brown leaves. They break the plant material down by ingesting it, then later excrete it as faeces, and may return to eat the faeces in turn (coprophagy), once bacteria and fungi have further broken them down.

=== Pill bugs and pill millipedes ===
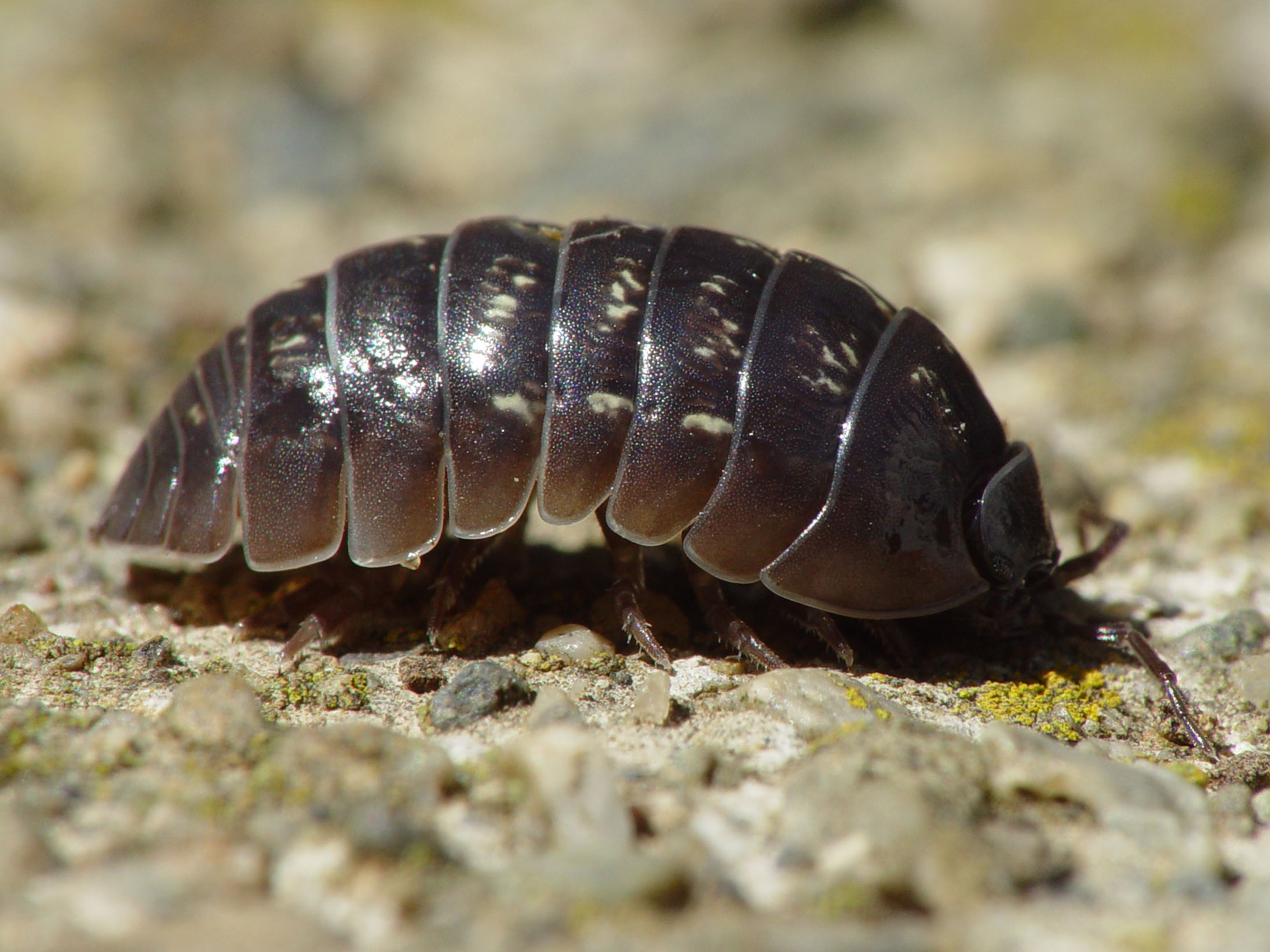
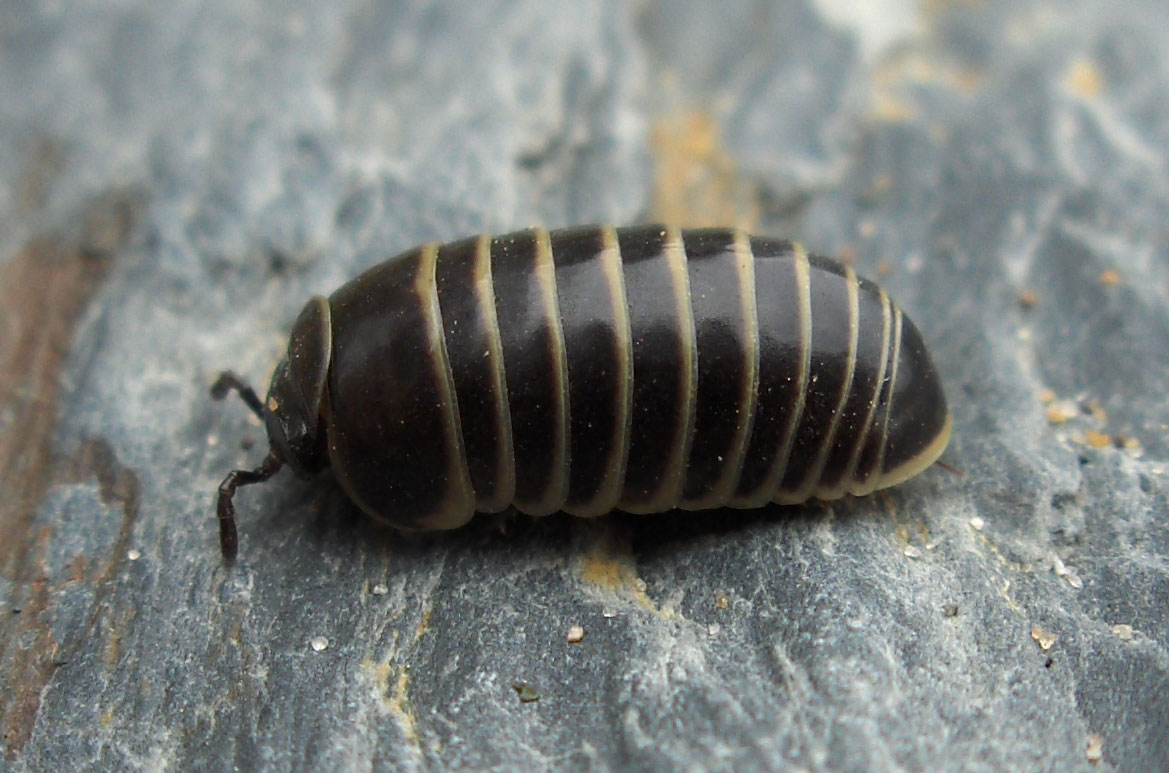
Comparison of the pill bug Armadillidium vulgare (left) and the pill millipede Glomeris marginata (right)

Pill bugs (woodlice of the families Armadillidiidae and Armadillidae) can be confused with Pill millipedes of the order Glomerida. Both of these groups of terrestrial segmented arthropods are about the same size. They live in very similar habitats, share a similar diet, and conglobate as a defence mechanism. Pill millipedes and pillbugs appear superficially similar to the naked eye. This is an example of convergent evolution.

These two groups can be distinguished in several ways. Glomeris millipedes have 19 (males) or 17 (females) pairs of legs as adults, while adult pill bugs only have 7 pairs of legs. Additionally, pill bugs have a thorax consisting of 7 body segments, 5 abdominal segments, and a pleotelson, while Glomeris millipedes lack a visually defined thorax and have 12 body segments in total. While the uropods of pillbugs are relatively quite small, flipping a pill bug over will reveal the small uropod overlapping the pleotelson.

=== Life cycle ===
A female woodlouse will keep fertilised eggs (around 40 eggs, 400 to 600 µm in diameter, for Porcellio scaber) in a marsupium on the underside of her body, which covers the under surface of the thorax and is formed by overlapping plates attached to the bases of the first five pairs of legs. They hatch into mancae that look like small white woodlice curled up in balls, although initially without the last pair of legs. The mother then appears to "give birth" to her offspring. A few species are also capable of reproducing asexually by parthenogenesis, e.g. Trichoniscus pusillus.

Eggs, such as those of Porcellio scaber, typically develop for 1-2 months before hatching, with post embryonic woodlouse taking between 2-3 months to fully mature.

=== Distribution ===
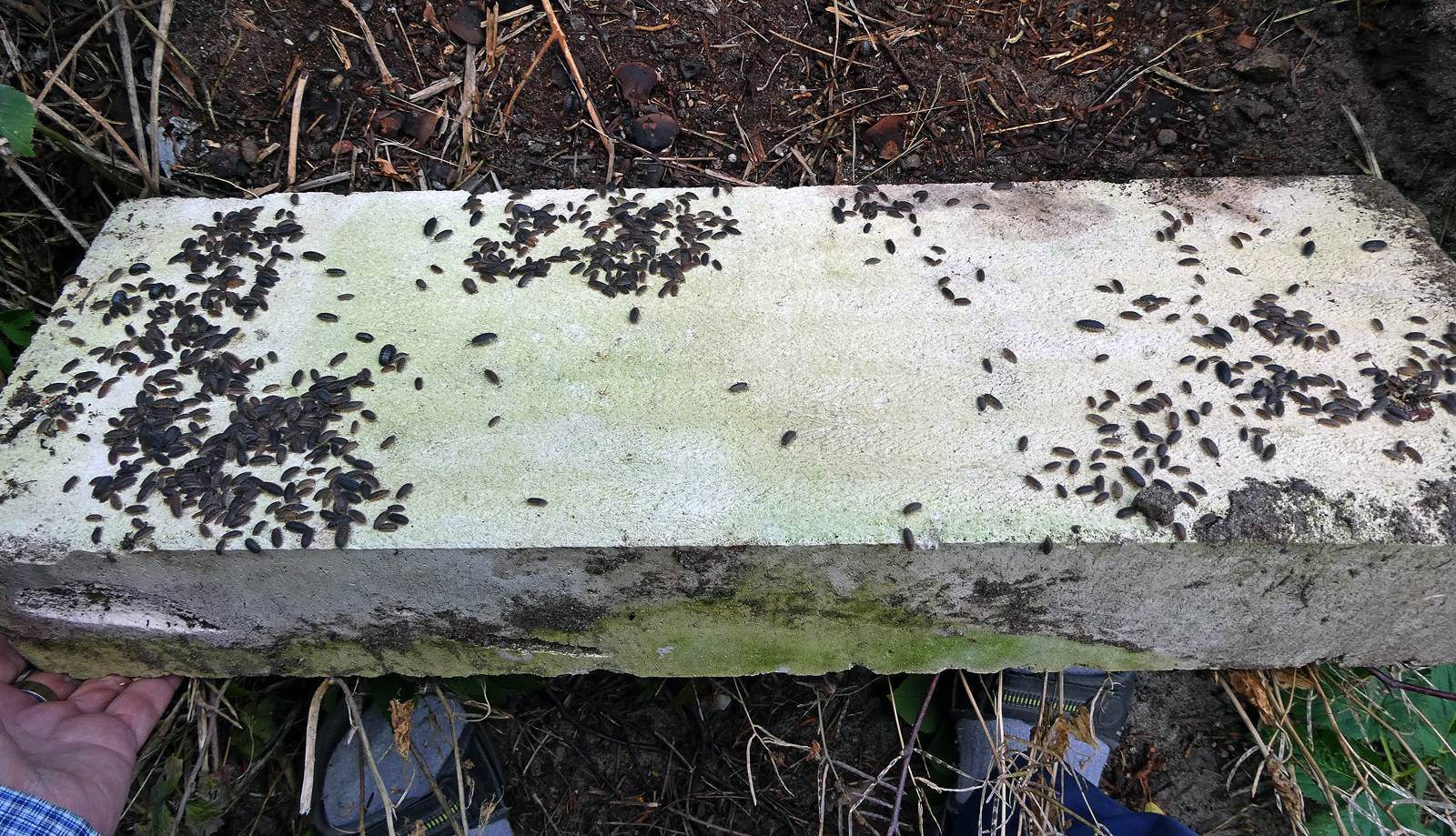
Woodlice under a concrete block

Woodlice can be found in every continent other than Antarctica, in almost all kinds of terrestrial and coastal habitats, being absent only from polar regions and very high altitudes. A poleward expansion of woodlice populations has been observed and attributed to global climate warming in Britain, like many other plant and animal taxa, but this postulate is still awaiting confirmation from dispersal studies, because several other mechanisms can interfere. Some species, like Hyloniscus riparius, are moving out of their original western European range, and are now invasive in a number of Russian ecosystems.

Woodlice are commonly found under stones or under the bark of decaying logs, in the moss at the base of trees, and they have been observed to climb on trees at night. Some species are commonly found on concrete and limestone walls and even on rooftops. By staying under rocks and logs during the day, they avoid desiccation in the sun, favouring to come out at night and during the morning or evening when the humidity is high enough.

Ancestral Oniscidea species are littoral, such as the marine-intertidal sea slater Ligia oceanica. They rely on gills (pleopodal endopods) for respiration and require moisture, whether by staying close to water or by living underground. Other examples include some Haloniscus species from Australia (family Scyphacidae), and in the northern hemisphere several species of Trichoniscidae, e.g. Brackenridgia heroldi, and Thailandoniscus annae (family Styloniscidae). Species for which aquatic life is assumed include Typhlotricholigoides aquaticus (Mexico) and Cantabroniscus primitivus (Spain).

Many members of Oniscidea live in terrestrial, non-aquatic environments, breathing through pleopodal lungs (paddle-shaped posterior appendages) with pseudotrachea (branched air tubules). The pseudotrachea structure is well described in Porcellio scaber. Some Crinocheta members evolved to have spiracles that control airflow into their pleopodal lungs. Many woodlice still retain the gill-like endopod structures that continue to serve osmoregulatory functions. Woodlice need moisture because they rapidly lose water by excretion and evaporation through their cuticle, and so are usually found in damp, dark places, such as under rocks and logs, although one species, the desert-dwelling Hemilepistus reaumuri, inhabits "the driest habitat conquered by any species of crustacean". Pericyphis is another xerophillic isopod with unique pseudotrachea structure, extending from the pleopods into their body cavity.

=== Behaviour ===
==== Kinesis and taxis ====
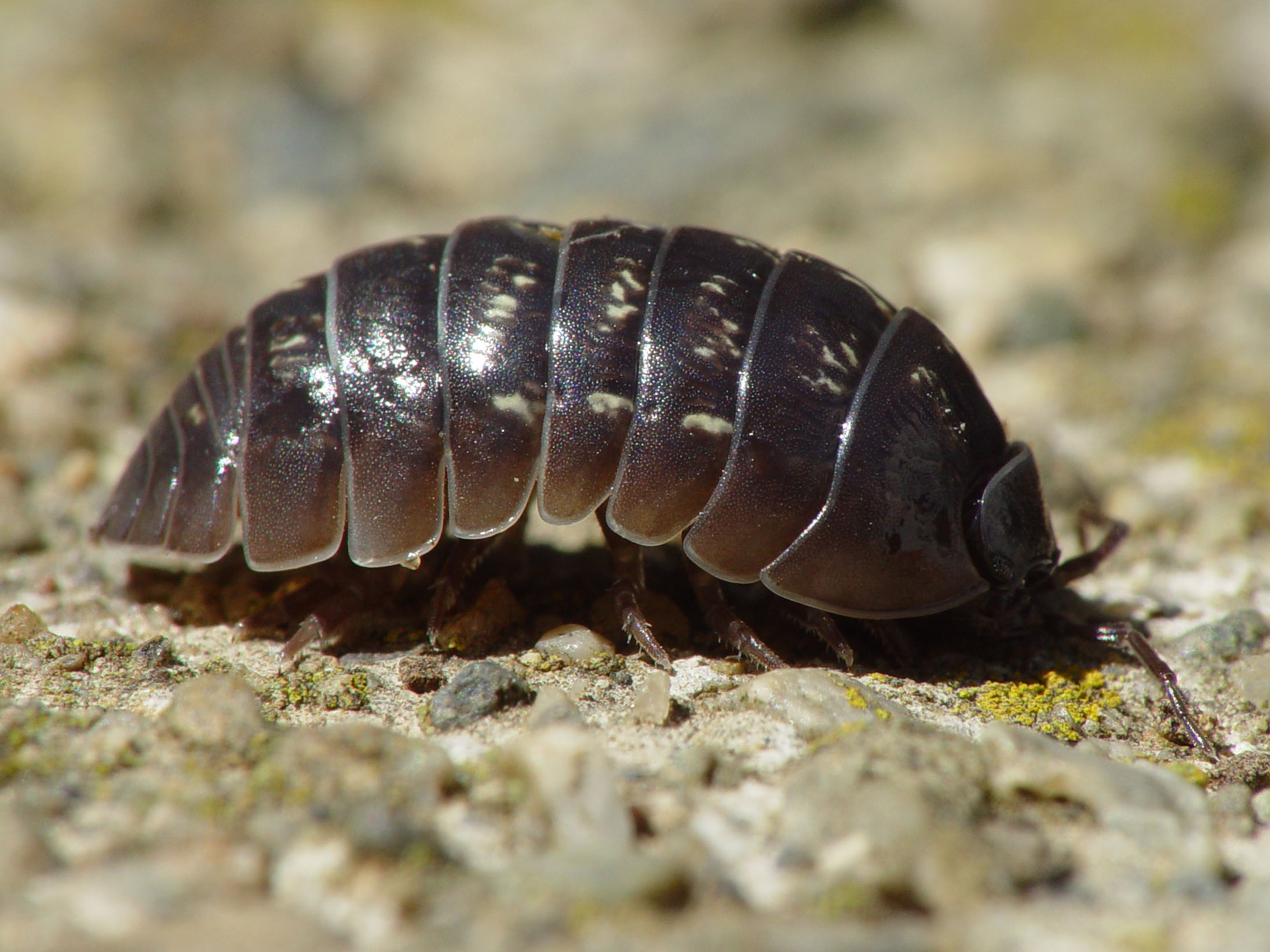
Armadillidium vulgare on the move...

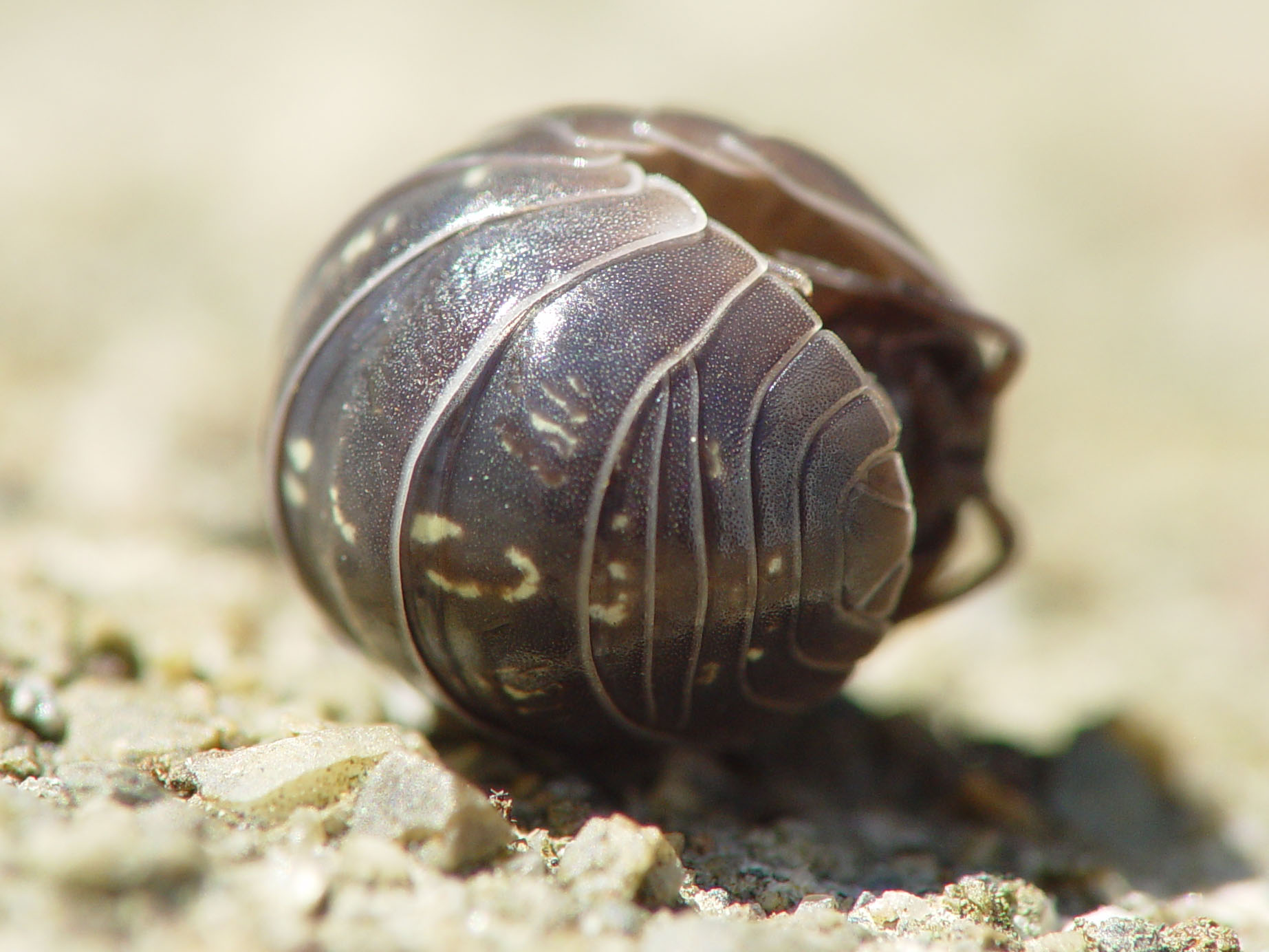
...and rolled into a ball.

Studies have been done on the locomotion and stimulus response in woodlouse since Robert Hughes' seminal studies on the adaptive function of response alternation in Porcellio scaber. Woodlice move towards preferred (dark and humid) environments by a combination of directional movements (taxis) and random turning movements (kinesis). Simple experiments for classrooms demonstrate that woodlice are able to choose within ten minutes the dark side (against the light side) of a petri dish, negative photokinetic response to light being reinforced by thigmotaxis when individuals stop moving when close to each other, resulting in rapid aggregation in the favourable environment. Learning capacity was demonstrated in behavioural processes involved in spatial navigation. In an experiment, Porcellio scaber exposed to 'rotational stress', by being rotated rapidly, exhibited stress behaviour such as a notable reduction in exploratory locomotion, however if the woodlouse had previously been exposed to the experiment they would exhibit these behaviours far less than they had after the initial exposure, a case of non-associative learning (habituation).

==== Aggregation ====
Aggregation mediated by pheromones and environmental heterogeneity is commonplace in woodlice, much is still unknown about the nature of the pheromones used. The behaviour is thought to be the result of several adaptive functions. Individuals huddle closely together thereby minimising the gaps through which moisture can escape, reducing the chance of desiccation in low humidity. In winter the same behaviour may reduce heat loss from the body of individuals (kleptothermy). The close proximity of individuals of the same species also increases the rate of successful mating. Groups preferentially aggregate in locations with suitable conditions, and with food sources nearby. The information exchanged between individuals during aggregation is still awaiting to be documented.

==== Conglobation ====
Some species of Woodlouse are capable of either partial or complete conglobation, which is the ability to roll up into a ball often referred to as volvation in animals. Families with members capable of either partial or complete conglobation include Armadillidae, Armadillidiidae, Eubelidae, and Tylidae. Armadillidium vulgare in particular can draw its antennae inwards during conglobation, this may make Armadillidiidae the only family with members capable of complete conglobation without interruption of appendages. Conglobation can protect against predators by covering the soft underside of the body and exposing the thick outer cuticle to predators, and can also help conserve moisture in conditions of low humidity or high temperature when no shelter is available. Armadillidium nasatum and Armadillidium vulgare have been observed to conglobate at 40°C under laboratory conditions with reduced water loss compared to experiments where it was prevented from conglobating by being suspended in place with metal wire, although in these experiments it was noted that the wire may have damaged the cuticle in some cases and accelerated water loss.

== Ecology ==
Environmental extremes

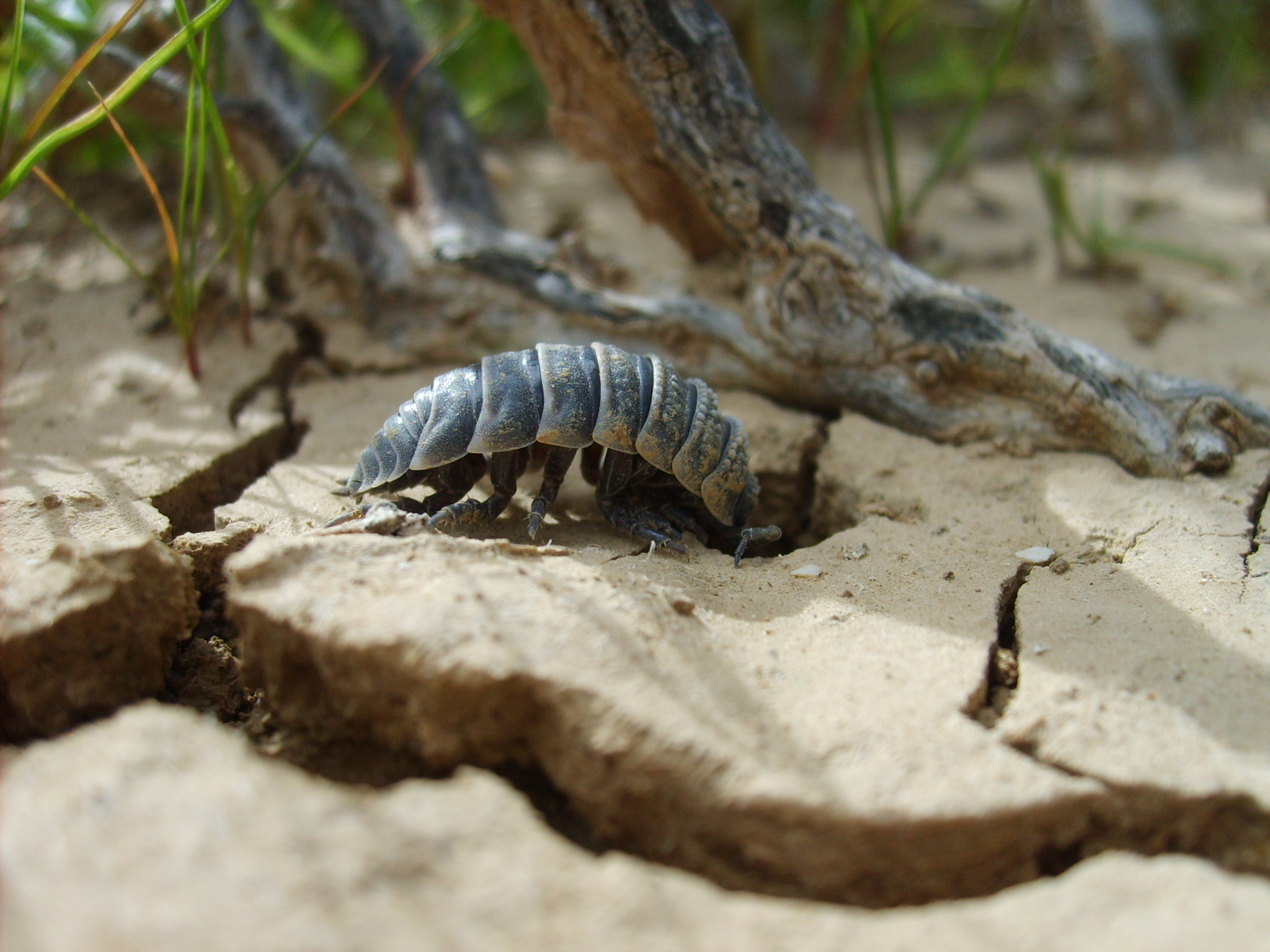
Hemilepistus reaumuri lives in "the driest habitat conquered by any species of crustacean".

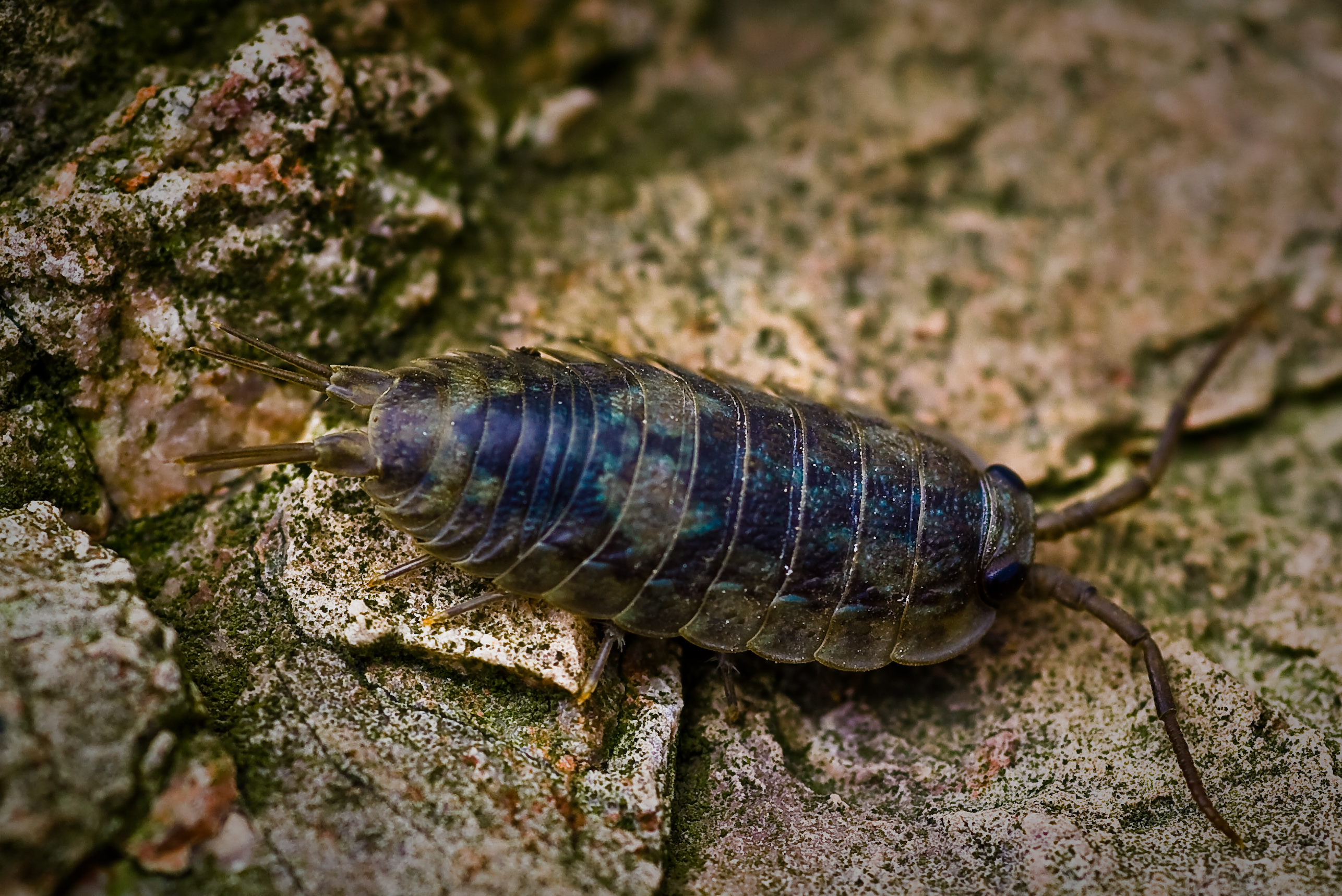
Ligia oceanica lives in the littoral zone.

Woodlice are a major contributor to the humification process by helping to turn dead plant matter into soil. However, and contrary to earthworms, they fragment in small pieces but do not grind finely the ingested plant matter, thus poorly contributing to its mineralization.

Heavy metal intake, such as zinc, cadmium, lead and copper, is studied in woodlice because it is accumulated in their tissues, particularly the hepatopancreas, at higher concentrations than most other terrestrial animals.

Woodlice are eaten by a wide range of insectivores, including spiders of the genus Dysdera, such as the woodlouse spider Dysdera crocata, and multiple species of land planarians such as Luteostriata ernesti. Woodlice use different strategies to escape predators, varying according to species and their functional traits and habits, e.g. by secreting noxious or repulsive compounds, aggregating, jumping, running, clinging, conglobating, stridulating or just by staying inactive (the "to not be seen" strategy).

Platyarthrus hoffmannseggii is a species of woodlice that is often found in ant nests (myrmecophily), feeding off their excreta or those (honeydew) of mutualistic aphids or even feeding on mutualistic fungi. Other woodlice species are also sometimes found in ants nests, including Porcellio scaber.

Woodlice are sensitive to agricultural pesticides, but can tolerate some toxic heavy metals (e.g. copper from copper-treated orchards and vineyards, including those under organic farming), which they accumulate in the hepatopancreas. Thus they can be used as bioindicators of heavy metal pollution.

== Evolution ==
=== Taxonomy ===
While the broader phylogeny of the Oniscideans has not been settled, eleven infraorders/sections are agreed on with 3,937 species validated in scientific literature in 2004 and 3,710 species in 2014, out of an estimated total of 5,000–7,000 species extant worldwide. The earliest oniscid fossils are from Early Cretaceous.

The most recent isopod phylogeny based on 148 isopods across 12 genes support the monophyly of the Oniscidea clade and a single terrestrialisation event. This is in opposition to previous research which has suggested grouping as traditionally defined may not be monophyletic, with some taxa like Ligia and possibly Tylidae more closely related to other marine isopod groups, though the majority of woodlice probably do constitute a clade. Movement further inland by Ligia or Tylos-like ancestors is likely to have occurred multiple times independently.

There is general agreement that there are five main lineages in suborder Oniscidea, although the phylogenetic relationships between them are unsettled. Two main schemes for the classification differ in which group is considered sister to the remaining oniscideans. One places Ligiidae in section Diplocheta, with the remaining families divided between four sections in infraorder Holoverticata. The other places Tylidae in infraorder Tylomorpha, with the remaining families placed in three sections in infraorder Ligiamorpha. The former scheme is presented below.

- Infraorder/section Diplocheta
  - Ligiidae
- Infraorder Holoverticata
- Section: Tylida
  - Tylidae
- Section: Microcheta
  - Mesoniscidae
- Section: Synocheta
  - Schoebliidae
  - Styloniscidae
  - Titaniidae
  - Trichoniscidae
  - Turanoniscidae
- Section: Crinocheta
  - Agnaridae
  - Alloniscidae
  - Armadillidae
  - Armadillidiidae
  - Balloniscidae
  - Bathytropidae
  - Berytoniscidae
  - Cylisticidae
  - Delatorreiidae
  - Detonidae
  - Eubelidae
  - Halophilosciidae
  - Olibrinidae
- Crinocheta (cont'd)
  - Oniscidae
  - Philosciidae
  - Platyarthridae
  - Porcellionidae
  - Pudeoniscidae
  - Rhyscotidae
  - Scleropactidae
  - Scyphacidae
  - Spelaeoniscidae
  - Stenoniscidae
  - Tendosphaeridae
  - Trachelipodidae

Beyond these, some genera are of uncertain familial assignment such as:

- Exalloniscus
- Sunniva

etc.

=== Evolutionary history ===
Woodlice are widely regarded as a model taxon for studying group behaviour and the evolutionary transition from water to land.

The oldest fossils of woodlice are known from the mid-Cretaceous around 100 million years ago, from amber deposits found in Spain, France, and Myanmar. These include a specimen of living genus Ligia from the Charentese amber of France, the genus Myanmariscus from the Burmese amber of Myanmar, which belongs to the Synocheta and likely the Styloniscidae, Eoligiiscus tarraconensis which belongs to the family Ligiidae, Autrigoniscus resinicola which belongs to the family Trichoniscidae, and Heraclitus helenae which possibly belongs to Detonidae all from Spanish amber, and indeterminate specimens in Charentese amber. The widespread distribution and apparent diversification of woodlice in the mid-Cretaceous implies that the origin of woodlice predates the breakup of Pangaea in the late Paleozoic, likely during the Carboniferous.

Woodlice themselves are thought to have evolved from ancestors that lived on the sea-bed, by way of intertidal forms which developed the ability to survive out of the water for longer and longer periods. The most primitive kinds of woodlice, Ligia for example, have evolved very little from this intertidal condition.

== Relationship to humans ==
=== Common names ===
Common names for woodlice vary widely throughout the English-speaking world, a number making reference to the fact that some species can roll up into a ball, others comparing the woodlice to a pig.

Common names include:

- armadillo bug
- boat-builder (Newfoundland, Canada)
- butcher boy or butchy boy (Australia, mostly around Melbourne)
- carpenter or cafner (Newfoundland and Labrador, Canada)
- cheeselog (Reading, England)
- cheesy bobs (Guildford, England)
- cheesy bug (North West Kent, Gravesend, England)
- chisel pig
- chucky pig (Devon, Gloucestershire, Herefordshire, England)
- chuggy pig (Devon, England)
- doodlebug
- fat pig (Ireland)
- gramersow (Cornwall, England)
- hog-louse
- mochyn coed ('tree pig'), pryf lludw ('ash bug'), granny grey in Wales
- pill bug
- potato bug
- roll up bug
- roly-poly
- slater (Scotland, Ulster, New Zealand and Australia)
- sow bug
- wood bug (British Columbia, Canada)
- wood pig (mochyn coed, Welsh)

=== As pests ===
Although woodlice, like earthworms, are generally considered beneficial in gardens for their role in controlling certain pests, producing compost and overturning the soil (bioturbation), some species like those of the genus Armadillidium have also been known to feed on cultivated plants, such as ripening strawberries and tender seedlings.

Woodlice can also invade homes in groups searching for moisture, and their presence can indicate dampness problems. They are not generally regarded as a serious household pest as they do not spread disease, do not bite or sting, and do not damage sound wood or structures. They can be easily removed with the help of vacuum cleaners, chemical sprays, insect repellents, and insect killers, or (best) by removing the dampness as a cause of their attraction to the house interior.

=== As food ===
The taste of foraged woodlice has been described as similar to that of other crustaceans. However, woodlice can also have a "strong urine" taste likely due to high concentrations of uric acid in some species.

=== As bioindicators ===
Woodlice often reside within leaf and needle litter, making them good bioindicators for habitat quality in agricultural landscapes, decreasing in abundance and species diversity when land changes from permanent to temporary grasslands and then to 'artificial' grasslands.

Woodlice have been suggested as bioindicators of trace element contamination due to their ability to accumulate heavy metals in vesicles (lysosomes) within their body, in particular in the hepatopancreas. However, the fact that metal accumulation efficiency declines under highly contaminated conditions, stemming in nonlinear relationships between environmental and body metal concentrations, limits their quantitative applicability.

=== As pets ===
Woodlice have become a popular household pet for children as well as a hobby for invertebrate and insect enthusiasts or collectors.

While some isopod species are kept purely as pets, some can also be used as an addition to bioactive terrariums, due to their ability to break down decaying organic materials.

==== Hobby morphs ====
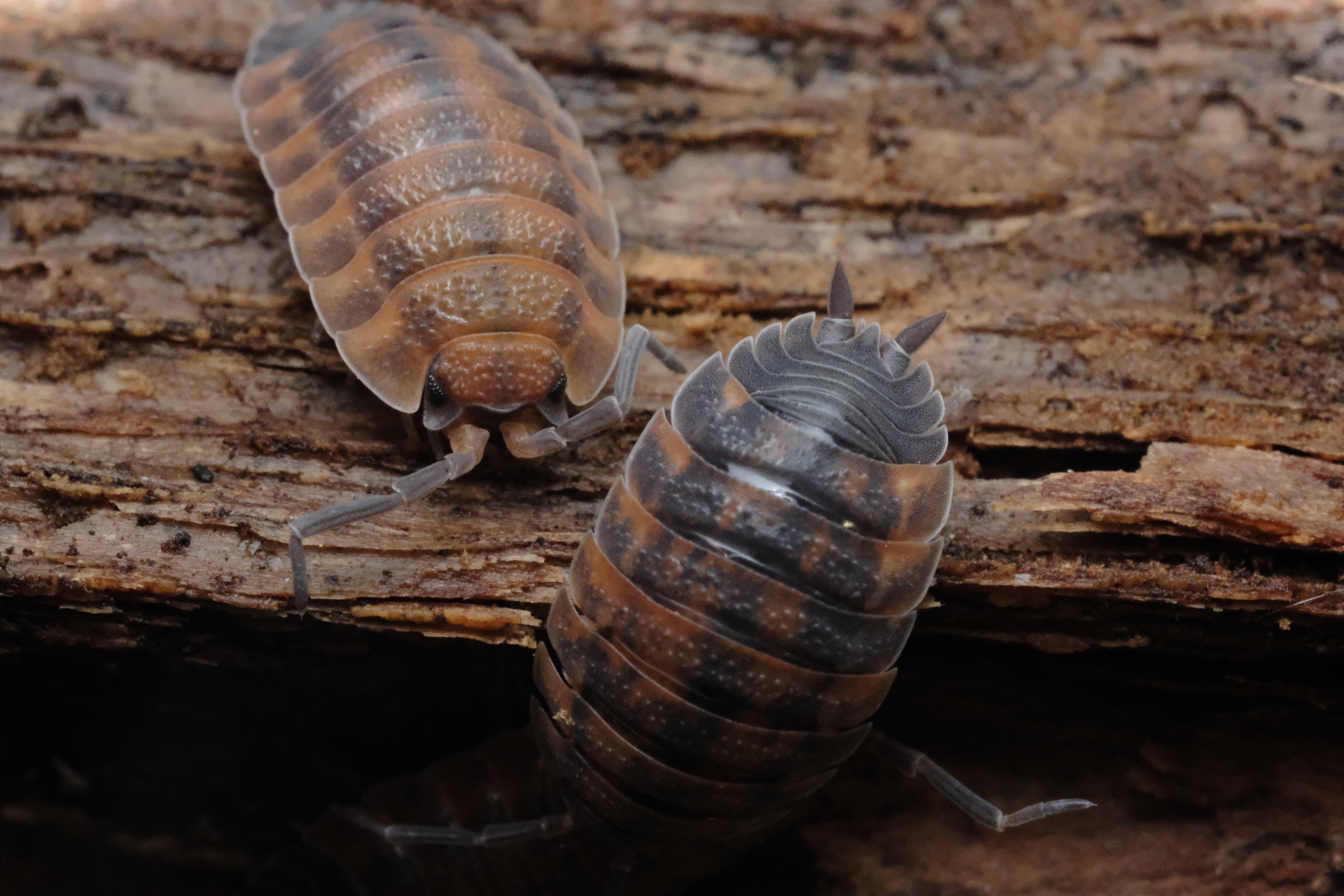
Porcellio scaber 'lava' morph

As isopods are bred in captivity, some hobbyists will discover a new mutation, or they will selectively breed isopods for a specific colour pattern expression. These populations with unique appearances are referred to as 'morphs'. Morphs are given nicknames, usually by the breeder who discovered/created the morph. The standard appearance of an isopod species is often referred to as 'wild type'. Some isopod morphs are characterized by polygenic traits, such as 'Orange Vigor' (Armadillidium vulgare) and 'Pink Rubber Ducky' (Cubaris sp. "Rubber Ducky"), the result of selectively breeding isopods that best match the desired appearance. These traits can vary significantly. Other morphs are the result of dominant or recessive mutations affecting pigmentation, examples include albino morphs, as well as morphs with prominent colours such as red, orange, or yellow.

== See also ==
- Invertebrate iridescent virus 31 – a species of virus hosted by woodlice
- List of woodlice of the British Isles
