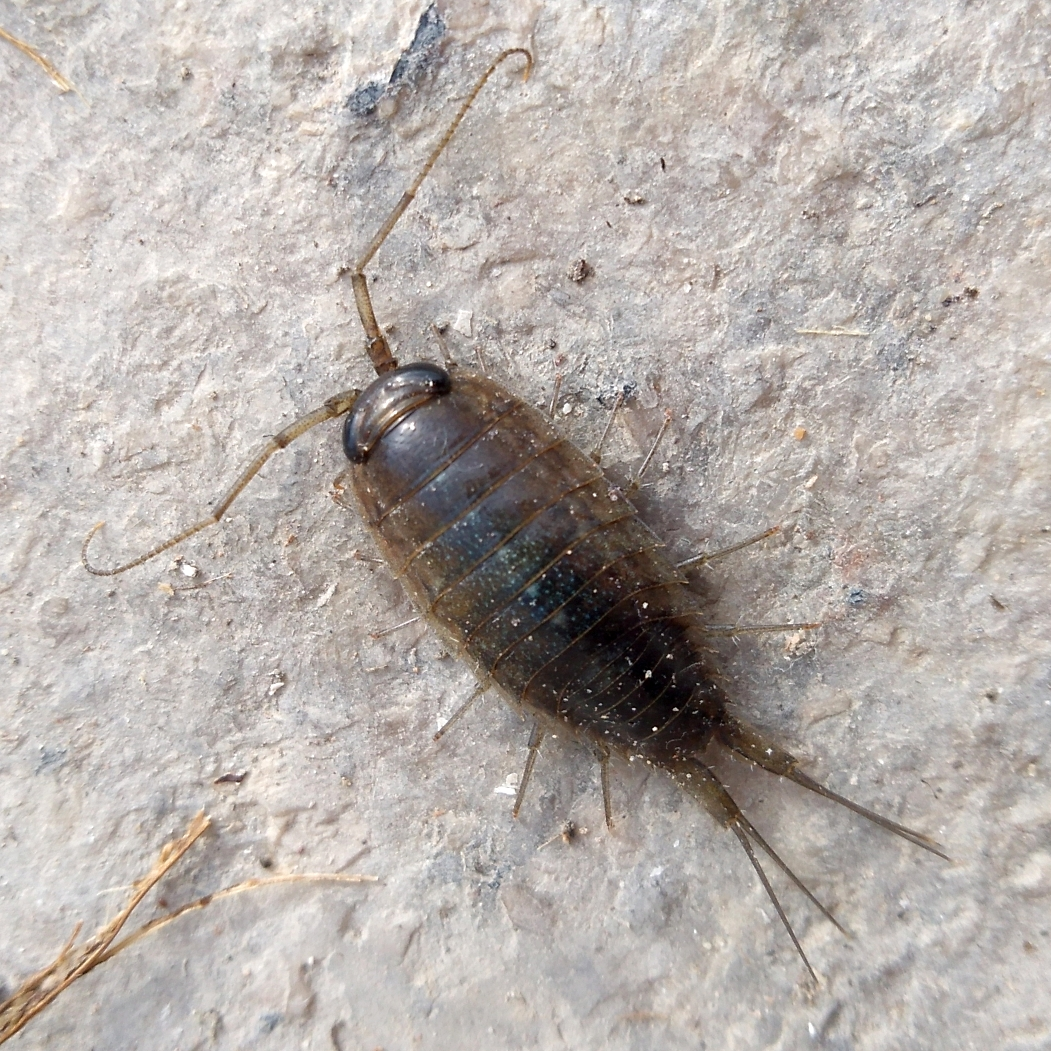

Scientific classification
- Kingdom: Animalia
- Phylum: Arthropoda
- Clade: Pancrustacea
- Class: Malacostraca
- Order: Isopoda
- Suborder: Oniscidea
- Family: Ligiidae
- Genus: Ligia
- Species: L. cinerascens

Binomial name
- Ligia cinerascens Budde-Lund, 1885
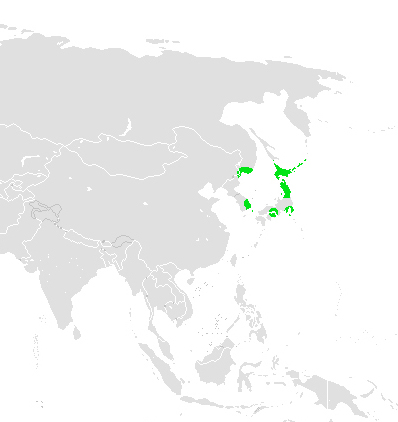
- Distribution of L. cinerascens based on available literature

= Ligia cinerascens =

Species of woodlouse

Ligia cinerascens is a woodlouse in the family Ligiidae.

== Description ==
L. cinerascens is very similar to L. occidentalis with more antenna segments, but shorter overall antennal length. It can be distinguished from L. exotica by its shorter antennae and uropods, as well as its uniformly gray color and granular texture. The species name cinerascens comes from the Latin for "ashy," referring to the gray color of this species.

== Life cycle ==
In the wild, L. cinerascens usually lives about a year (overwintering once), but occasionally lives up to 2.5 years (overwintering twice). Females breed in their first year for five months, then die before the second winter, typically producing one brood or two at the most. Reared in the lab, L. cinerascens has a longer lifespan and may produce three or more broods in a lifetime.

L. cinerascens is parasitized by Thinoseius setifer, a mite attaching to the woodlouse's pleopods.

== Distribution ==
G. H. A. Budde-Lund found samples of L. cinerascens on a long ocean exploration, and when he returned, he could not remember if they had come from Japan, Manila, or Chile, limiting current knowledge of the full range of the species. It has also been found on Kuril Islands (specifically Kunashir Island) and Peter the Great Gulf in far western Russia. It is one of four Ligia species to be found on Japanese coasts. Specifically, it is found mainly on Hokkaido, with a separate population in Tokyo Bay.
