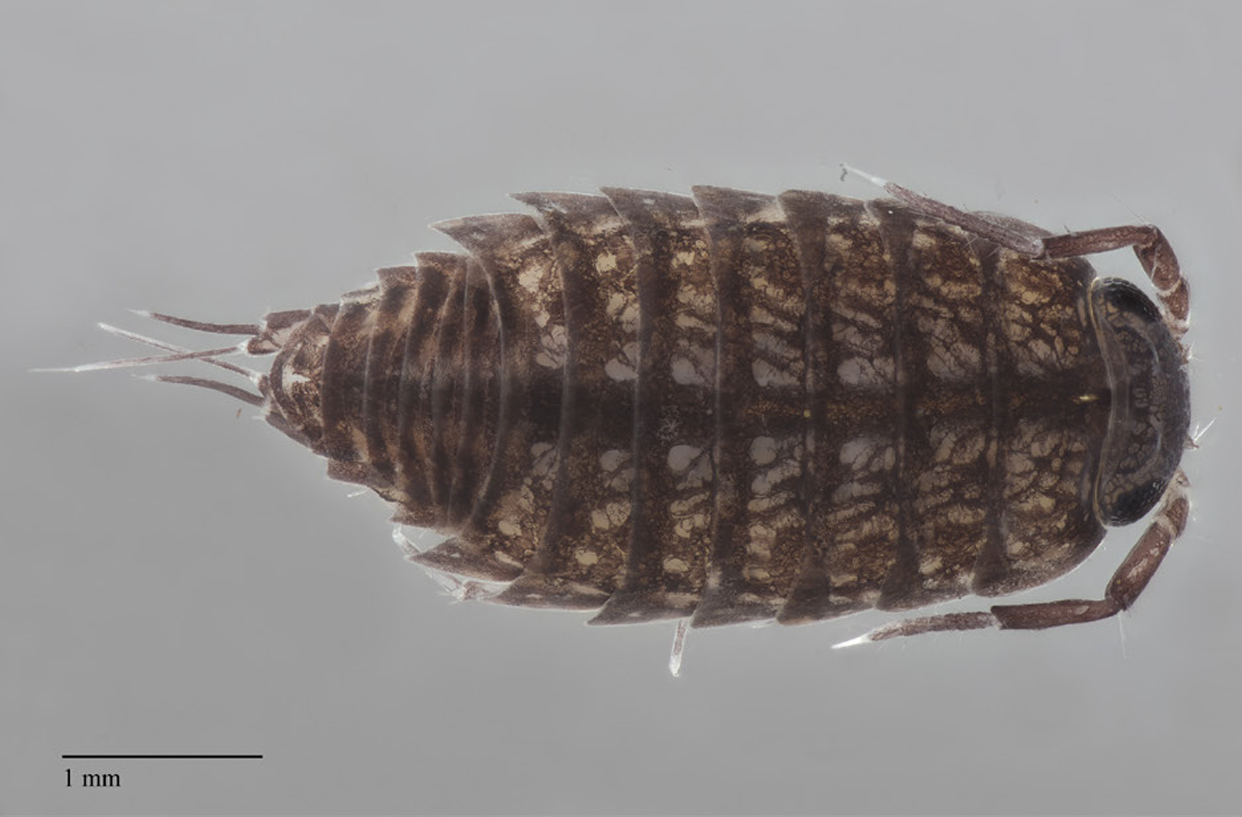

Scientific classification
- Kingdom: Animalia
- Phylum: Arthropoda
- Clade: Pancrustacea
- Class: Malacostraca
- Order: Isopoda
- Suborder: Oniscidea
- Family: Ligiidae
- Genus: Ligidium
- Species: L. blueridgensis

Binomial name
- Ligidium blueridgensis Schultz, 1964

= Ligidium blueridgensis =

Species of woodlouse

Ligidium blueridgensis is a species of terrestrial isopod in the family Ligiidae, found in the United States. It is known from the southern Blue Ridge Mountains of Georgia, North Carolina, South Carolina, and Tennessee. The species was originally described in 1964 by George Schultz from two females and one male collected under a rotten log in northern Georgia just south of Highlands, North Carolina. Ligidium blueridgensis spans several biogeographical barriers across its distribution that other southern Appalachian Ligidium do not cross. Despite this, the species shows deeply divergent mitochondrial lineages delineated by these barriers, suggesting an old presence and diversification within the southern Blue Ridge Mountains.

Ligidium blueridgensis is morphologically very similar to Ligidium pacolet and Ligidium whiteoak. It can be distinguished from these two species by the slender projection on the end of the male second pleopod endopodite rising from the inner tip corner from the dorsal surface and pointing caudally and inwards. Additionally, the male pleopod endopodite broadens in the final third of its length in Ligidium pacolet, but remains the same width in Ligidium blueridgensis.
