= Cockroaches of the sea =

Cockroaches of the sea may refer to:

- Ligia oceanica, an isopod also known as a "sea slater"
- Ligia exotica, an isopod also known as a "sea roach"
- Crab, a family of marine crustaceans
- Lobster, a family of marine crustaceans
- A description of minke whales by whaling official Masayuki Komatsu
