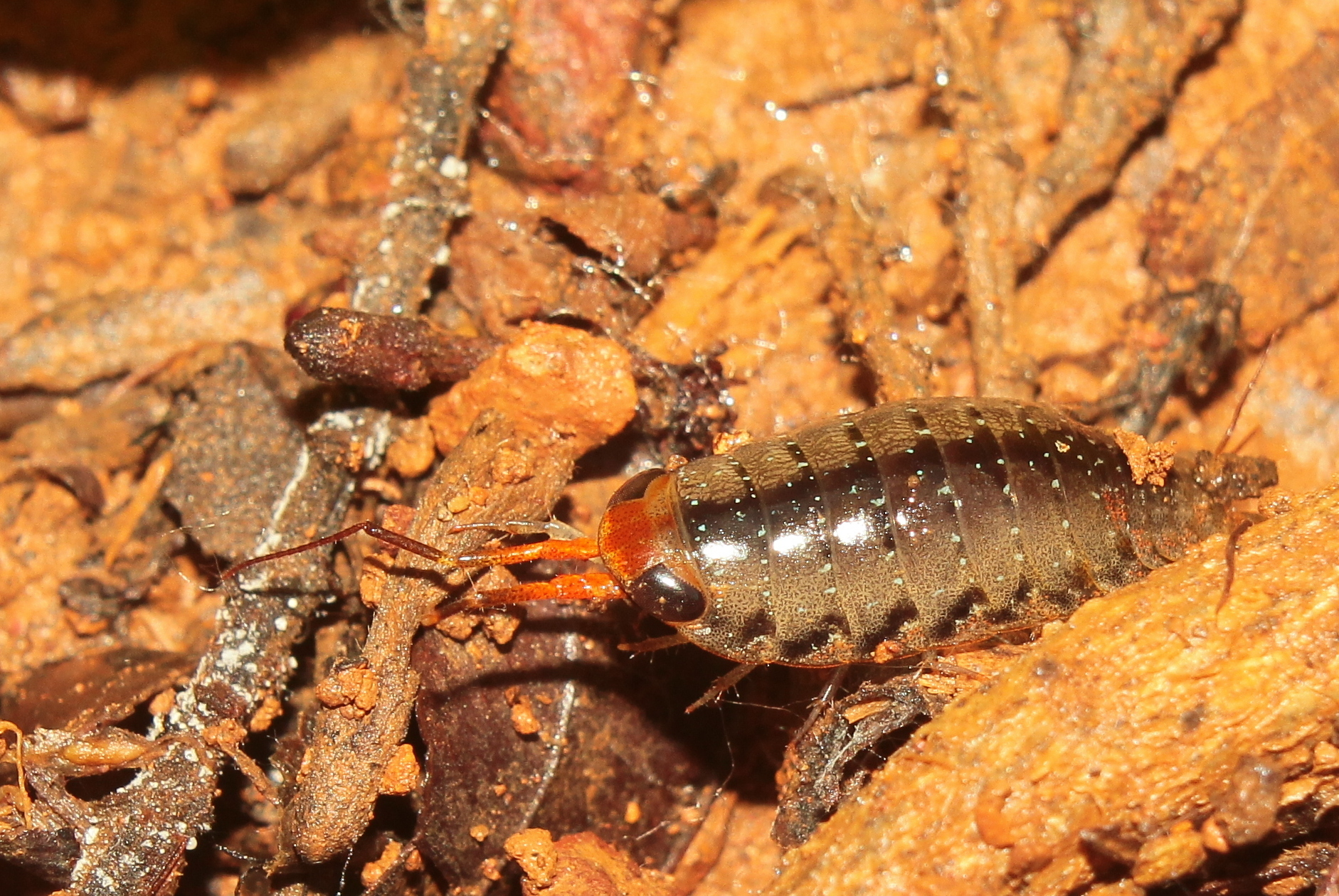

Scientific classification
- Kingdom: Animalia
- Phylum: Arthropoda
- Clade: Pancrustacea
- Class: Malacostraca
- Order: Isopoda
- Suborder: Oniscidea
- Family: Ligiidae
- Genus: Ligia
- Species: L. platycephala

Binomial name
- Ligia platycephala (Van Name, 1925)

= Ligia platycephala =

Species of woodlouse

Ligia platycephala is a species of isopod from the genus Ligia.

== Description ==
When seen from above, L. platycephala resembles L. exotica, in the soft, weakly articulated body and the posteriorly narrowing outline at the back tropics. However, the abdomen is proportionally smaller in Ligia platycephala. Also, the L. platycephala is considerably smaller than L. exotica. In the original description, the properties of this species are described by comparing to L. exotica.

It will suffice to mention the remaining differences between this species and L. exotica. If we may judge by the specimens available, it is considerably smaller; the largest one (a female with well-developed marsupial plates bearing a considerable number of rather large eggs or embryos) is a little less than 18 mm. long. The largest male is about 16.5 mm. long. The colors are brighter and more variegated, though due to similar minute irregularly stellate or branching blackish pigment spots on a yellowish ground color. They are however so distributed in the present species as to form a distinct, broad, blackish median stripe on both the thorax and abdomen, and on the thorax also a series of large, somewhat rectangular obliquely placed blackish spots at the junction of the epimeral portion of the segments with the main portion. These give the appearance of lateral longitudinal dark stripes when not too closely inspected; between these lateral and the median stripes there are on each side one or two small transverse dark markings on the rear edges of the thoracic segments. Elsewhere on the upper parts, as well as below and on the legs, the minute pigment spots are more thinly scattered and do not much obscure the strongly yellowish ground color. The body surface is very smooth, exhibiting no granulation or minute tuberculation on magnification. The head is much longer and is rather flattened, exhibiting in a dorsal view a strongly convex anterior border and a concave posterior border that is considerably set back into the thorax. The eyes are more elongate and much less bulging. The second antennae are shorter than in L. exotica. They are longer in the male specimens where they reach to or even a very little way along the abdomen when well drawn back, than in the females, where they can only reach the sixth or seventh thoracic segment. (The male specimens have 16 or 17 articles on the flagellum, the females 15 or 16, but the male has the peduncular part more elongated than the female). The thoracic segments differ from those of L. exotica in having the epimera smaller and completely fused with the main portion in both sexes. Their posterior corners are angular; the last three sharply so; the others a trifle rounded at the apex. The legs are long and well developed. No sexual differences were found in the structure of the first leg (fig. 70 would represent the first leg of either sex) which much resembles that of the female exotica. This species differs greatly from L. exotica in the peculiar outline of the rear end of the telson. It lacks the backwardly directed points at the lateral corners and on the median line; the former are merely bluntly angular, and at the median line there is a small notch between two small obtuse projections. The styloid appendages of the pleopoda of the male are very straight and slender and reach nearly to the end of the telson. Each process has a broad shallow groove along its ventral aspect. As the tip is approached the sides of the groove draw together, and curving toward the median side join to form a short obliquely projecting claw-like point (fig. 69). In the female the uropoda, inclusive of the inner branch, which is the longest, project beyond the telson a distance about equal to two-thirds the length of the body and head; this measurement is exclusive of a fairly long movable spine or bristle borne on the end of the inner branch. In the male the uropoda are proportionately a little longer than in the female.

L. playcephala resembles L. exotica
Ligia platycephala	Ligia exotica

== Taxonomy ==
The species was originally described by W.G. van Name in 1925 by its basionym Ligyda platycephala. It is part of the genus Ligia. The type specimen is located at the American Museum of Natural History

== Habitat ==
The habitat of this species is deadwood in damp forest.

== Range ==
The species' descriptions position it in Guyana. Specimens have been collected in the jungle of Kartabo. More recent observations aggregated in the Global Biodiversity Information Facility suggest that the species can also be found in Suriname, Trinidad and Tobago, and Venezuela
