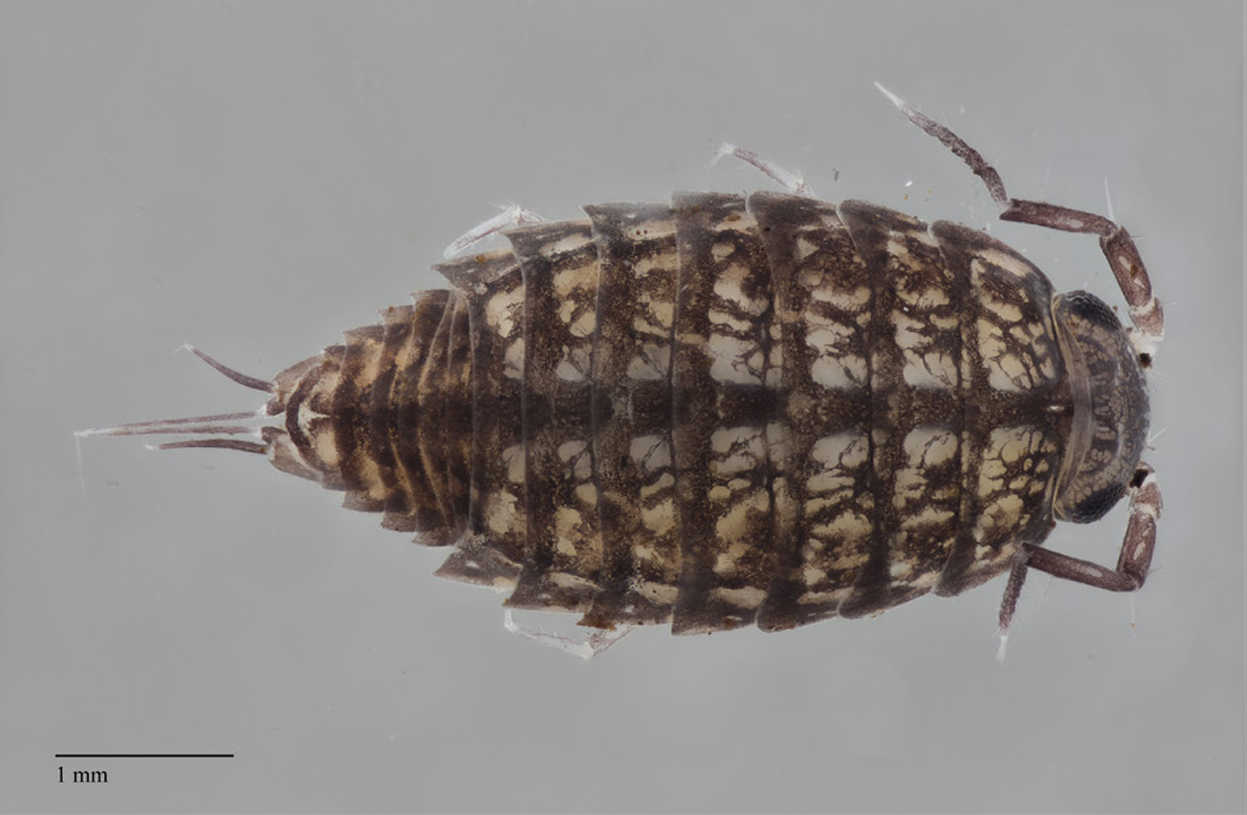

Scientific classification
- Kingdom: Animalia
- Phylum: Arthropoda
- Class: Malacostraca
- Order: Isopoda
- Suborder: Oniscidea
- Family: Ligiidae
- Genus: Ligidium
- Species: L. schultzi

Binomial name
- Ligidium schultzi Recuerdo & Caterino, 2025
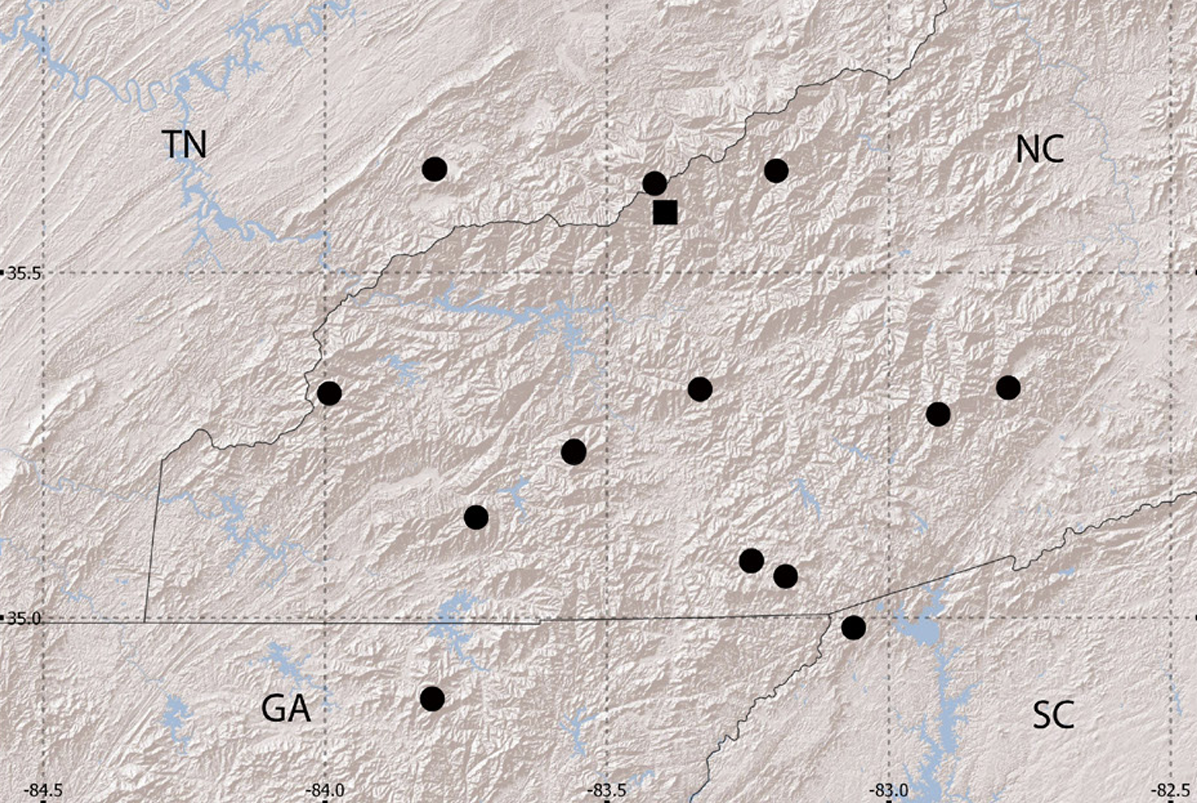
- Holotype location marked with a square, other known locations marked with circles

= Ligidium schultzi =

Species of woodlouse

Ligidium schultzi is a species of terrestrial isopod in the family Ligiidae, found in the United States. It is known from the southern Blue Ridge Mountains of Georgia, North Carolina, South Carolina and Tennessee. The species name schultzi honors George Schultz for his contributions to knowledge of Ligidium in North America. Additionally, Schultz discovered and illustrated Ligidium schultzi in 1982 but incorrectly identified it as a variant of Ligidium elrodii. Its habitat consists of moist leaf litter in conifer and deciduous forests, as well as under logs and stones.

Ligidium schultzi can be distinguished from closely related species by the distally broadened male second pleopod endopodite, with a small notch on the tip. The size of adult males ranges from 4.6–5.7 mm (0.18–0.22 in) in length and 2.5–2.8 mm (0.098–0.110 in) in width, and the size of adult females ranges from 4.7–5.7 mm (0.19–0.22 in) in length and 2.6–2.9 mm (0.10–0.11 in) in width.
