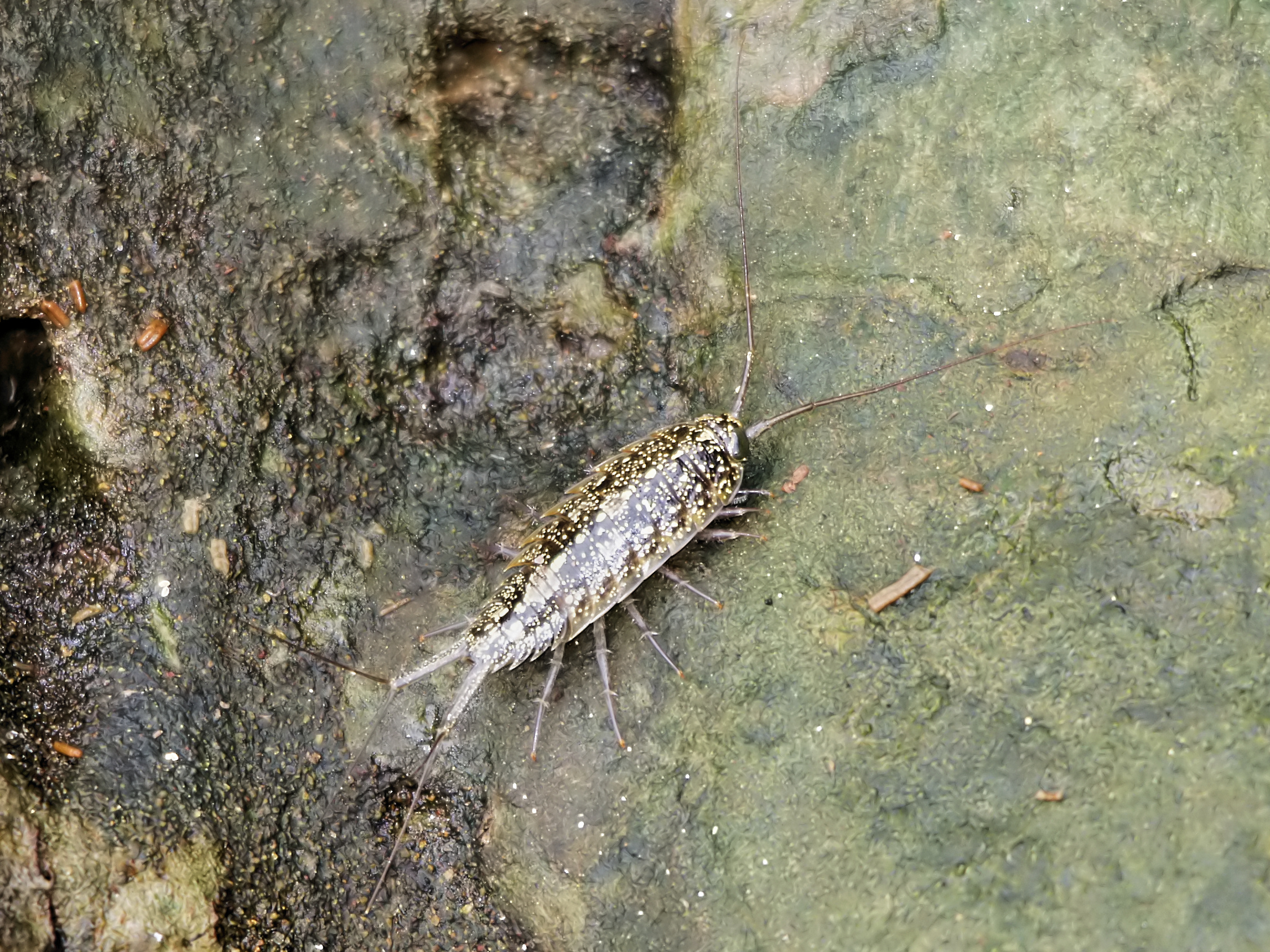

Scientific classification
- Kingdom: Animalia
- Phylum: Arthropoda
- Clade: Pancrustacea
- Class: Malacostraca
- Order: Isopoda
- Suborder: Oniscidea
- Family: Ligiidae
- Genus: Ligia
- Species: L. baudiniana

Binomial name
- Ligia baudiniana H. Milne-Edwards, 1840
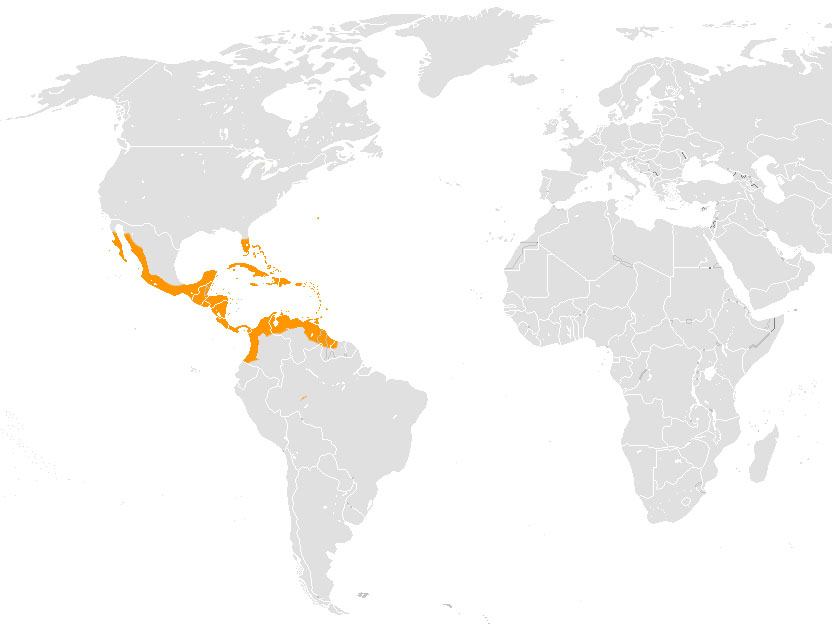
- Distribution of L. baudiniana based on available literature

= Ligia baudiniana =

Species of woodlouse

Ligia baudiniana is a woodlouse in the family Ligiidae. It has a coarsely granular surface and large eyes that are very close together.

== Distribution ==
L. baudiniana has been found from Bermuda to the Yucatán Peninsula and south to Panama.

== Behavior ==
They venture out in great numbers in the intertidal zone at low tide, then they retreat as the water returns, but they need the water to keep their gills warm and have never found more than 70 feet (21 m) from shore. They cannot live in seawater for extended periods, as can L. oceanica, for example. They survive best in moist environments, but cannot survive in fresh water, most likely due losing their vital salts via dilution.

To hydrate, they turn away from the water and dip their uropods in the water and oscillate the distance between the uropodal spines to draw water up onto their gills. When it rains, they come out en masse several feet from the shore.

L. baudiniana feeds primarily on the unicellular green algae that coat intertidal rocks, rasping them off with a vertical movement of the front half of its body.

L. baudiniana changes coloring, lighter or darker, based on its background.
