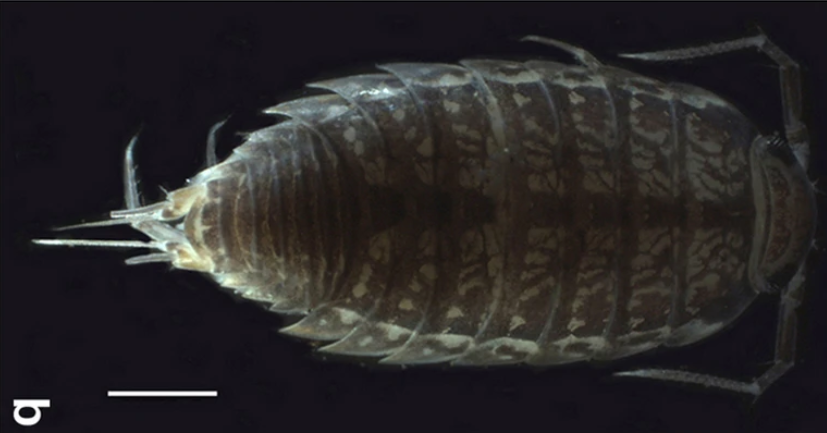

Scientific classification
- Kingdom: Animalia
- Phylum: Arthropoda
- Class: Malacostraca
- Order: Isopoda
- Suborder: Oniscidea
- Family: Ligiidae
- Genus: Ligidium
- Species: L. acuminatum

Binomial name
- Ligidium acuminatum Li, 2022

= Ligidium acuminatum =

Species of woodlouse

Ligidium acuminatum is a species of terrestrial isopod in the family Ligiidae, found in China. It is only known from a single location in Deqin County, Yunnan. The species name acuminatum refers to the acuminate tip of the male second pleopod endopodite. The only known specimens were collected in an alpine meadow near a stream at 2,650 m (8,690 ft) above sea level.

Ligidium acuminatum is dark grey with white markings. Males range in size from 6.0–7.5 mm (0.24–0.30 in) in length and females range from 6.0–9.0 mm (0.24–0.35 in) in length. It is very similar to Ligidium rotundum in that the male second pleopod endopodite is narrowed toward the tip. Ligidium acuminatum can be distinguished from this species by the lack of any ornamentations on the endopodite.
