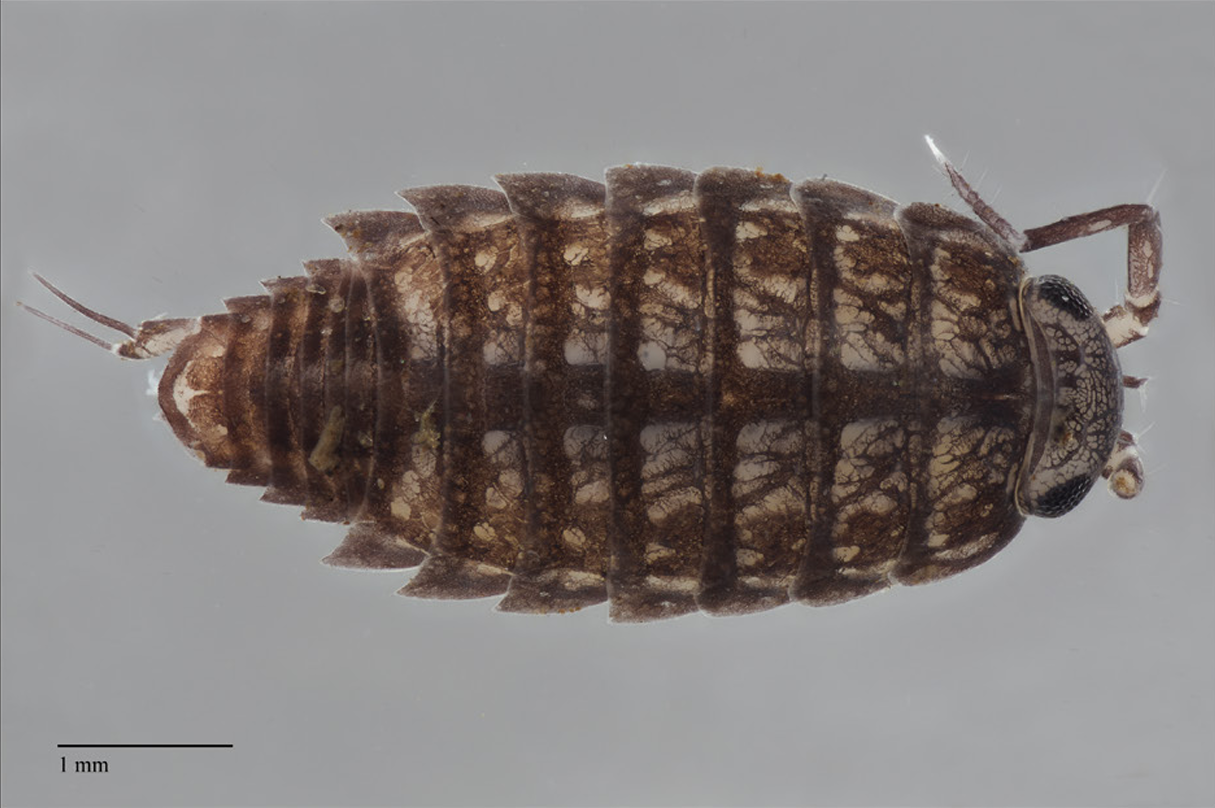

Scientific classification
- Kingdom: Animalia
- Phylum: Arthropoda
- Class: Malacostraca
- Order: Isopoda
- Suborder: Oniscidea
- Family: Ligiidae
- Genus: Ligidium
- Species: L. nantahala

Binomial name
- Ligidium nantahala Recuerdo & Caterino, 2025

= Ligidium nantahala =

Species of woodlouse

Ligidium nantahala is a species of terrestrial isopod in the family Ligiidae, found in the United States. It is only known from a single location in Clay County, North Carolina. The species name nantahala refers to Nantahala National Forest, where the only specimens of Ligidium nantahala have so far been collected. Its habitat consists of broad-leaf forest leaf litter.

Ligidium nantahala can be distinguished from closely related species by the male second pleopod endopodite with a robust projection occupying the inner part of the tip and projected outwards, as well as the triangular profile of the first male pleopod endopodite. The body length of adult males ranges from 4.9–5.5 mm (0.19–0.22 in), and 2.4–2.6 mm (0.094–0.102 in) in width.
