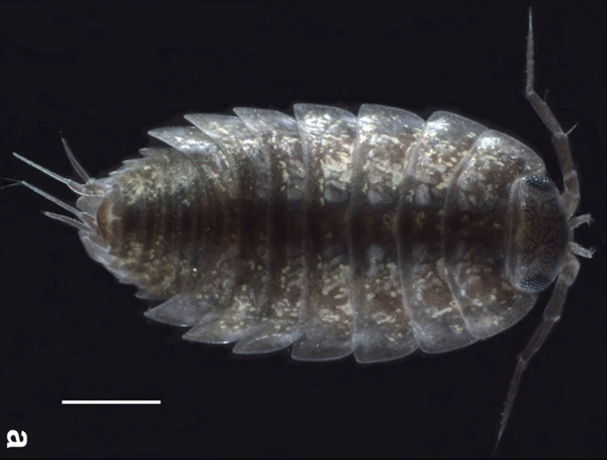

Scientific classification
- Kingdom: Animalia
- Phylum: Arthropoda
- Class: Malacostraca
- Order: Isopoda
- Suborder: Oniscidea
- Family: Ligiidae
- Genus: Ligidium
- Species: L. duospinatum

Binomial name
- Ligidium duospinatum Li, 2022

= Ligidium duospinatum =

Species of woodlouse

Ligidium duospinatum is a species of terrestrial isopod in the family Ligiidae, found in China. It is only known from a single location near Dongbacai Village in the Tibet Autonomous Region. The species name duospinatum refers to the diagnostic two spines on the apex of the male second pleopod endopodite, which distinguishes it from closely related species. The only known specimens were collected from beside a stream at 3,496 m (11,470 ft) above sea level.

Ligidium duospinatum is dark grey with white markings and yellowish green spots. Males range in size from 2.5–4.5 mm (0.10–0.18 in) in length and females range from 3.5–5.0 mm (0.14–0.20 in) in length. It is very similar to Ligidium inerme in overall appearance but can be separated by the flagellum having seven segments, and the presence of the namesake two spines on the male second pleopod endopodite.
