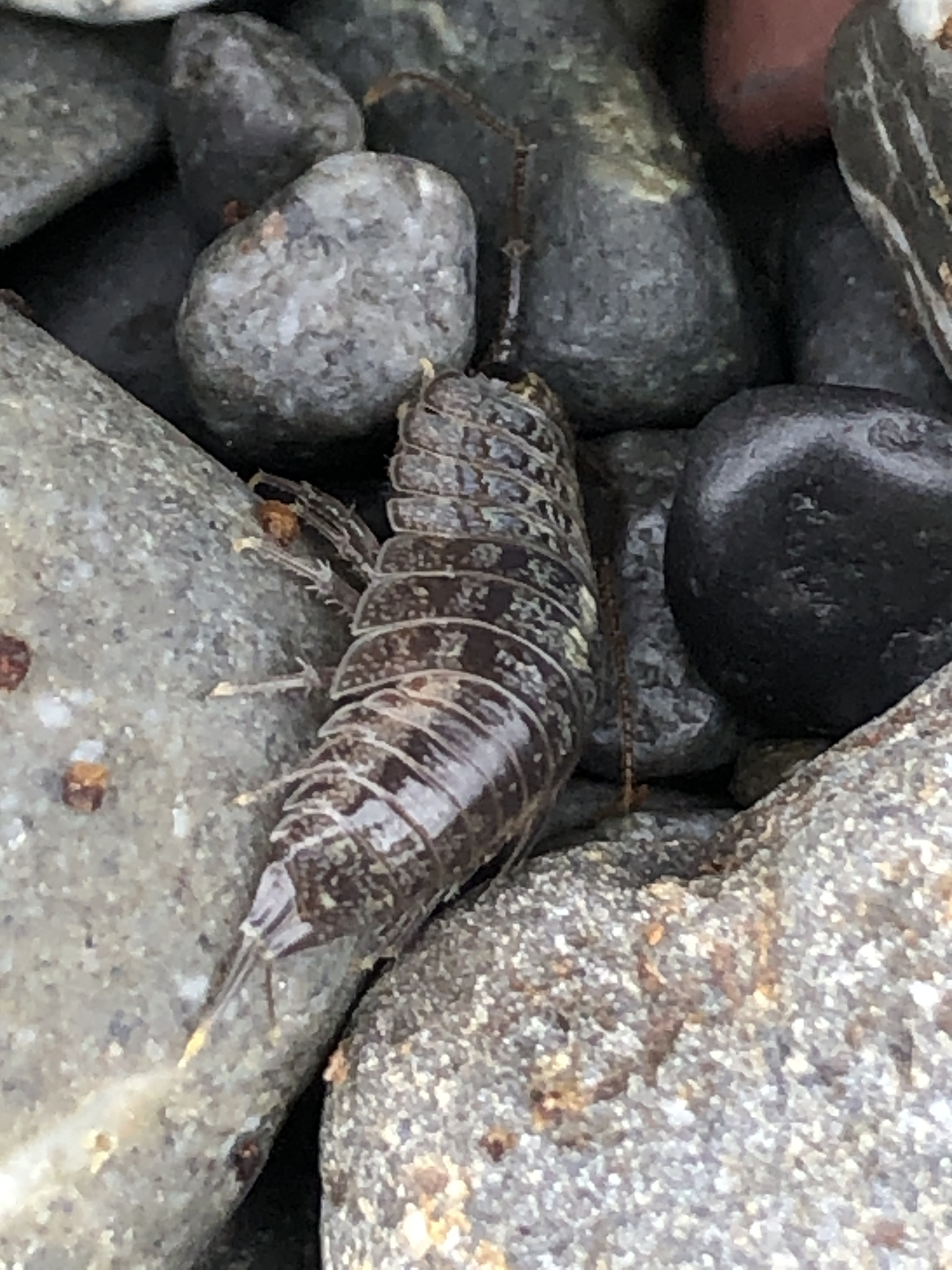
- Ligia novizealandiae in gravel

Scientific classification
- Kingdom: Animalia
- Phylum: Arthropoda
- Class: Malacostraca
- Order: Isopoda
- Suborder: Oniscidea
- Family: Ligiidae
- Genus: Ligia
- Species: L. novizealandiae

Binomial name
- Ligia novizealandiae (Dana, 1853)

= Ligia novizealandiae =

Species of crustacean

Ligia novizealandiae is a species of sea slater, endemic to New Zealand. It was described from the Bay of Islands. It lives on the shore, and can be found under kelp.
