= Ligia australiensis =

Scientific classification
- Kingdom: Animalia
- Phylum: Arthropoda
- Clade: Pancrustacea
- Class: Malacostraca
- Order: Isopoda
- Suborder: Oniscidea
- Family: Ligiidae
- Genus: Ligia
- Species: L. australiensis

Binomial name
- Ligia australiensis Dana, 1853
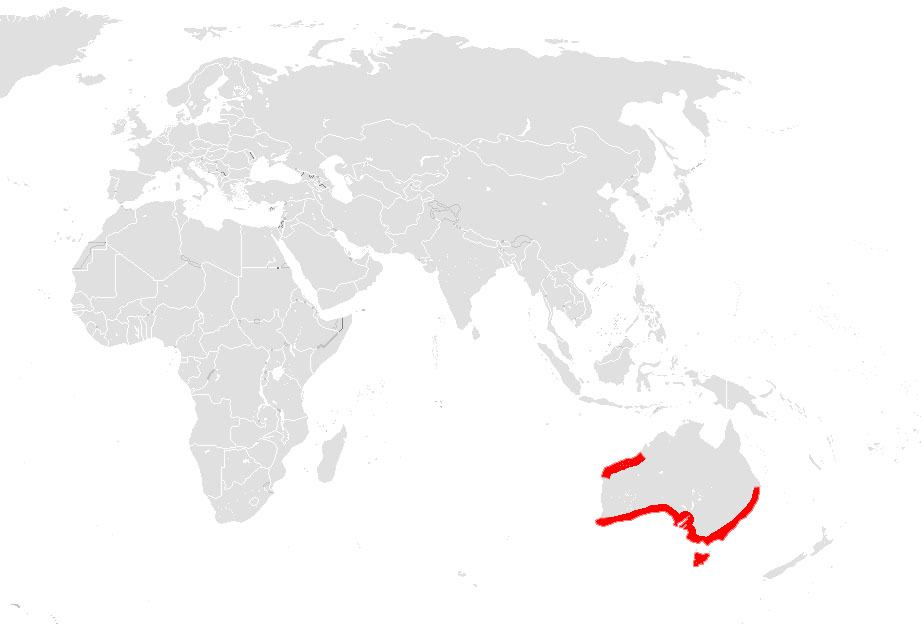
- Distribution of L. australiensis based on available literature

Species of woodlouse

Ligia australiensis, the Australian marine slater, is a woodlouse in the family Ligiidae.

== Range ==
It can be found quite readily along the southern coast of Australia, including Tasmania, hiding under a huge variety of cover. It is not found as often on the coast of New South Wales, although it can be found in abundance in estuaries.

== Predation ==
L. australienses is a frequent meal for the burrowing shore crab (Leptograpsodes octodentatus), occasionally for the sacred kingfisher (Todiramphus sanctus), and possibly the Pedra Branca skink (Niveoscincus palfreymani).
