= Ligidium lapetum =

Scientific classification
- Kingdom: Animalia
- Phylum: Arthropoda
- Class: Malacostraca
- Order: Isopoda
- Suborder: Oniscidea
- Family: Ligiidae
- Genus: Ligidium
- Species: L. lapetum

Binomial name
- Ligidium lapetum S. Mulaik & D. Mulaik, 1942

Species of woodlouse

Ligidium lapetum is a species of rock slater in the family Ligiidae. It is found in North America.
