= Ligia cajennensis =

Scientific classification
- Kingdom: Animalia
- Phylum: Arthropoda
- Clade: Pancrustacea
- Class: Malacostraca
- Order: Isopoda
- Suborder: Oniscidea
- Family: Ligiidae
- Genus: Ligia
- Species: L. cajennensis

Binomial name
- Ligia cajennensis Koch, 1847

Species of woodlouse

Ligia cajennensis is a woodlouse in the family Ligiidae. It has a relatively narrow body with a rough, grainy texture. It's a dark yellow/rust color, with lighter antennae and legs. Its eyes are brownish black.

== Distribution ==
L. cajennensis is known from the coast of French Guiana.

Only one specimen has been found for this species, in 1847, and since then, other authors have considered it too insufficiently described to comment further on it.
