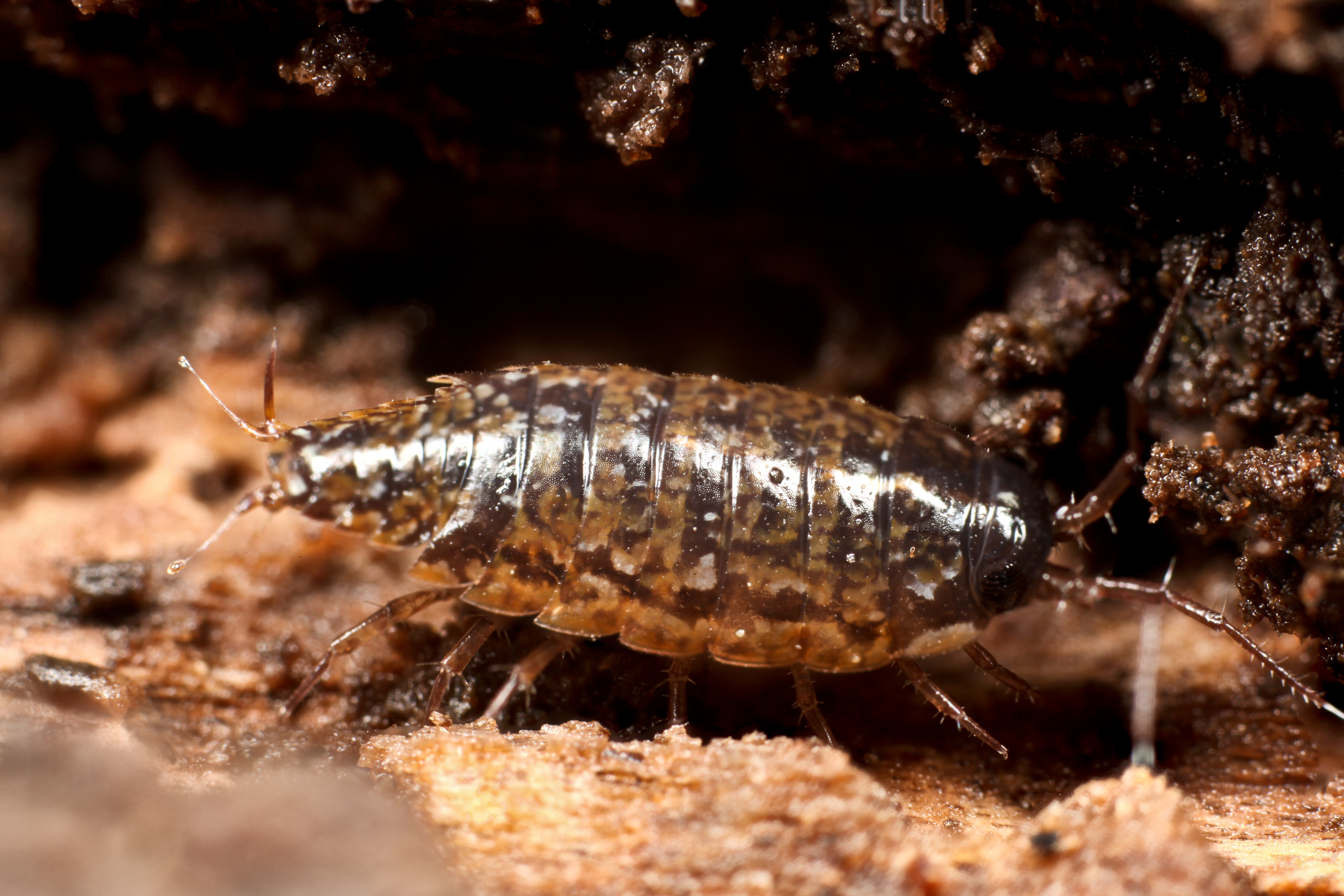

Scientific classification
- Kingdom: Animalia
- Phylum: Arthropoda
- Class: Malacostraca
- Order: Isopoda
- Suborder: Oniscidea
- Family: Ligiidae
- Genus: Ligidium
- Species: L. hypnorum

Binomial name
- Ligidium hypnorum (Cuvier, 1792)

Synonyms
- Ligia melanocephala C. Koch, 1838; Ligidium agile (Persoon, 1793); Ligidium amethystinum Schöbl, 1861; Ligidium carpathicum Verhoeff, 1937; Ligidium cursorium Budde-Lund, 1885; Ligidium melanocephalum (C. Koch, 1838); Ligidium paludicola (C. Koch, 1841); Ligidium persoonii Brandt, 1833; Ligidium silvaenigrae Verhoeff, 1937; Oniscus agilis Persoon, 1793; Oniscus hypnorum Cuvier, 1792; Zia agilis C. Koch, 1841; Zia melanocephala C. Koch, 1841; Zia paludicolia C. Koch, 1841; Zia saundersi Stebbing, 1873

= Ligidium hypnorum =

Species of woodlouse

Ligidium hypnorum is a species of woodlouse found across Europe and western Asia. It is a fast-moving, active species that rarely grows longer than 9 mm (0.35 in). It is dark and shiny, and is similar in appearance to the common species Philoscia muscorum, and also the rarer Oritoniscus flavus. In Great Britain, it was first discovered at Copthorne Common, Surrey, in 1873, and most later records are also from South East England. It is considered a good indicator species for ancient woodland.

== Disease ==
Prior to the recognition of Invertebrate iridescent virus 31 (IIV-31) in 1980, blue individuals of L. hypnorum had been discovered, which were interpreted to be new subspecies, and were described as such: L. hypnorum coeruleum Lereboullet 1843 and L. hypnorum amethystinum Schöbl 1861 (in reference to cerulean and amethyst, respectively). These cases have since been reinterpreted, not as distinct taxonomic entities, but as historical findings of individuals infected with IIV-31.

== See also ==
- List of woodlice of the British Isles
