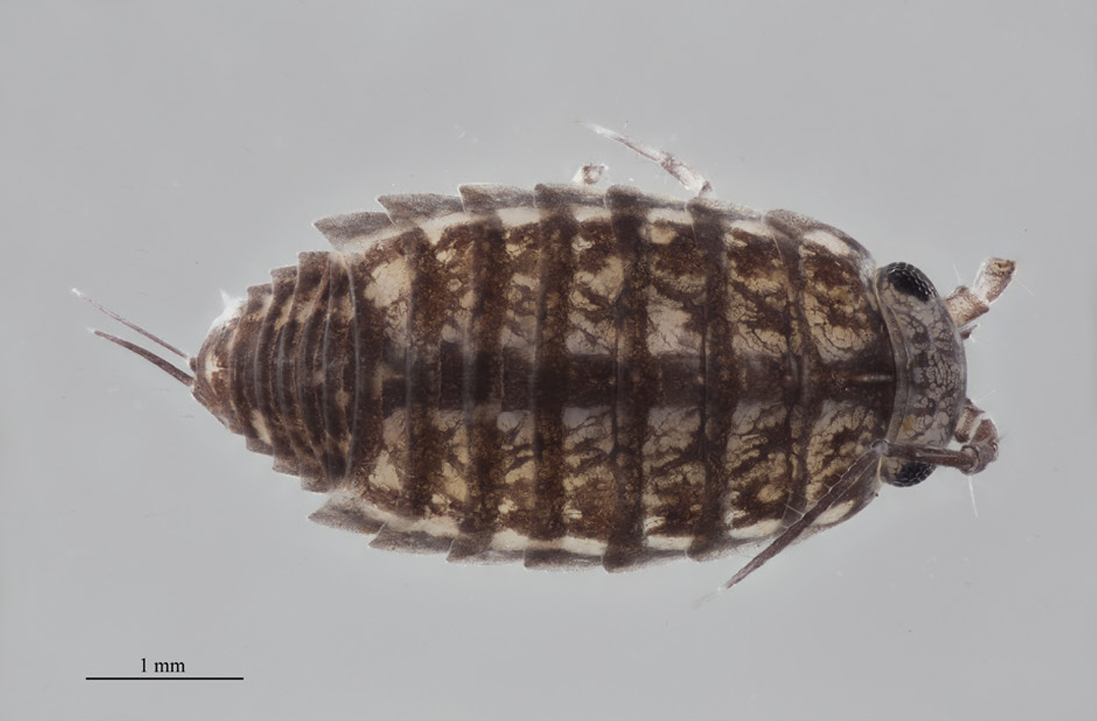

Scientific classification
- Kingdom: Animalia
- Phylum: Arthropoda
- Class: Malacostraca
- Order: Isopoda
- Suborder: Oniscidea
- Family: Ligiidae
- Genus: Ligidium
- Species: L. gadalutsi

Binomial name
- Ligidium gadalutsi Recuerdo & Caterino, 2025
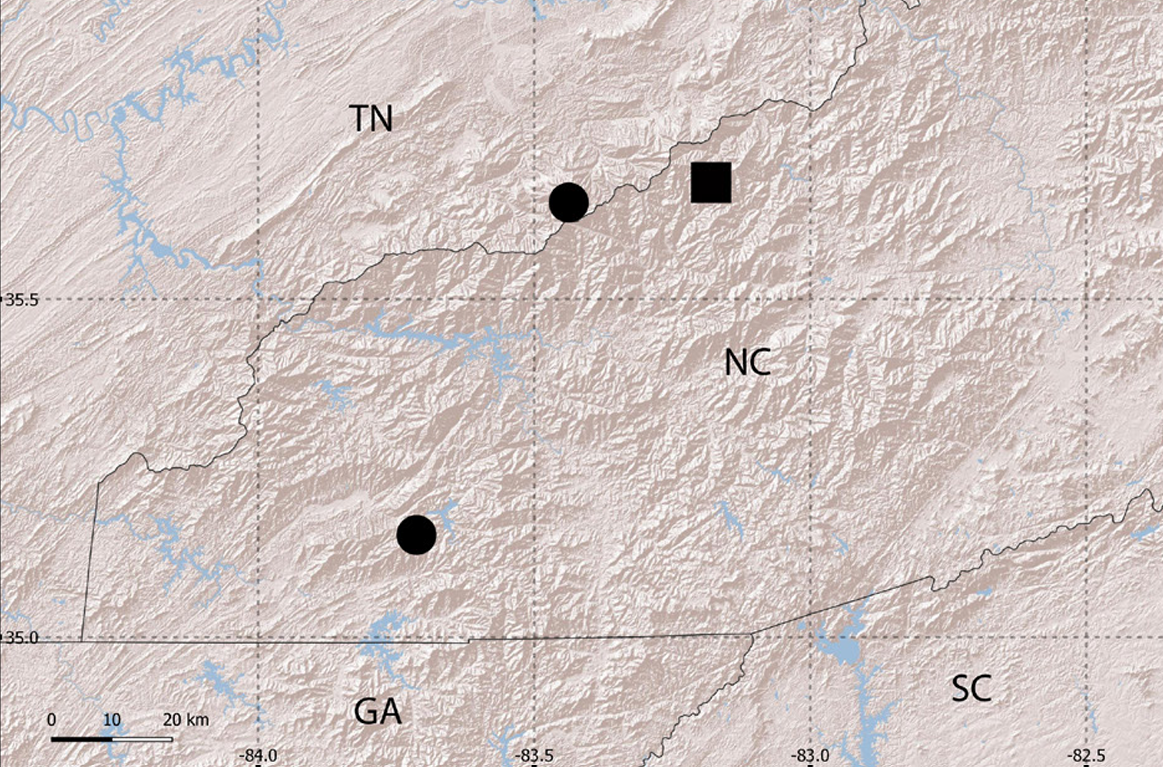
- Holotype location marked with a square, other known locations marked with circles

= Ligidium gadalutsi =

Species of woodlouse

Ligidium gadalutsi is a species of terrestrial isopod in the family Ligiidae, found in the United States. It is known from three locations: Haywood County, North Carolina and Sevier County, Tennessee (both within Great Smoky Mountains National Park), and Clay County, North Carolina (within Nantahala National Forest). The species name gadalutsi comes from the Cherokee word that originated the English "Cataloochee", in reference to the type locality, Big Cataloochee Mountain.

Ligidium gadalutsi can be distinguished from closely related species by the male second pleopod endopodite with an acuminate tip that is strongly projected outwards to each side. Additionally, the male first pleopod endopodite has a poorly defined, roughly triangular projection, and the male first pleopod exopodite has a flattened caudal margin.
