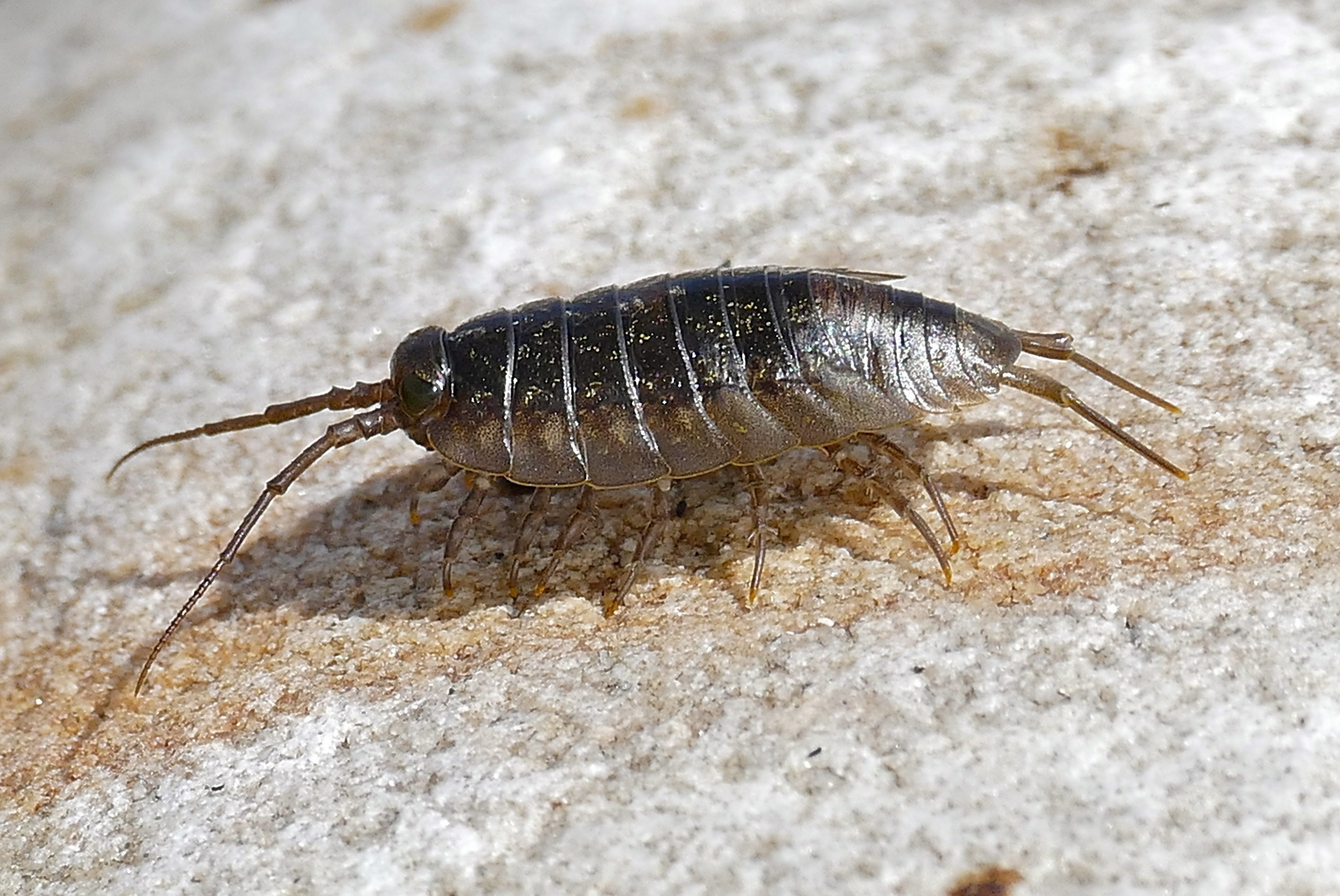

Scientific classification
- Kingdom: Animalia
- Phylum: Arthropoda
- Clade: Pancrustacea
- Class: Malacostraca
- Order: Isopoda
- Suborder: Oniscidea
- Family: Ligiidae
- Genus: Ligia
- Species: L. dilatata

Binomial name
- Ligia dilatata Brandt, 1833
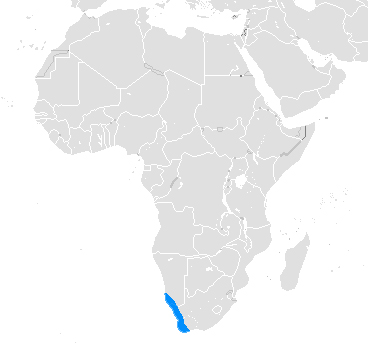
- Distribution of L. diletata based on available literature

= Ligia dilatata =

Species of woodlouse

Ligia dilatata is a woodlouse in the family Ligiidae.

== Identification ==
It has a finely granular surface and a body that is slightly convex, as well as eyes that are large and convex. It has relatively small uropods.

It can be differentiated from L. glabrata, with which it shares some range, by its antennae. The antennae of L. dilatata are longer, reaching the end of its thorax.

== Habits ==
Ligia dilatata feeds extensively on dislodged Ecklonia maxima and Laminaria pallida that wash up on shore. They gather in large numbers on these kelp.

The species lives about 2 years. Females start reproducing at 12 months but, unlike males, probably do not survive to breed twice. The brood period is 5 to 6 weeks.

Growth is slow during summer but faster in winter when food is more plentiful.
