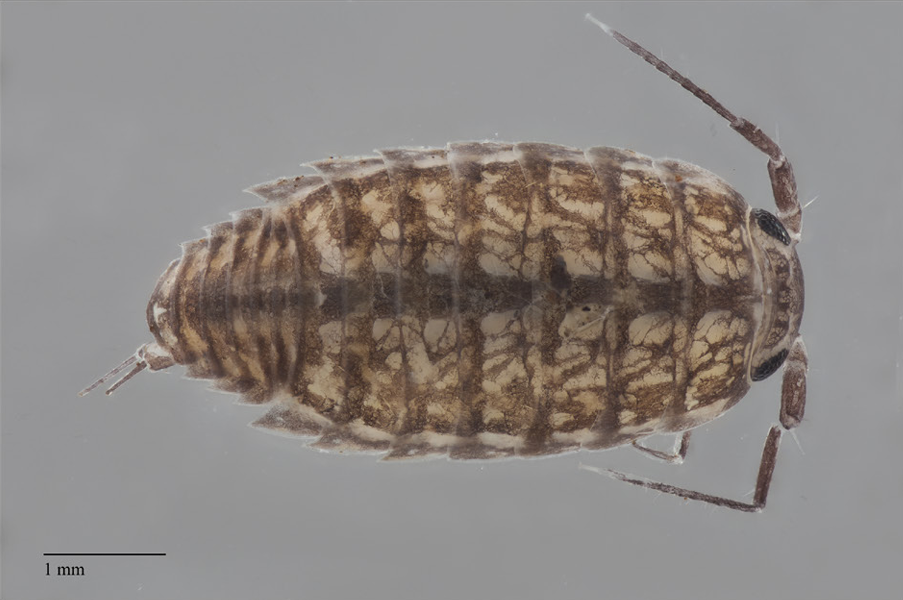

Scientific classification
- Kingdom: Animalia
- Phylum: Arthropoda
- Clade: Pancrustacea
- Class: Malacostraca
- Order: Isopoda
- Suborder: Oniscidea
- Family: Ligiidae
- Genus: Ligidium
- Species: L. enotahensis

Binomial name
- Ligidium enotahensis Recuero & Caterino, 2025

= Ligidium enotahensis =

Species of isopod

Ligidium enotahensis is a species of terrestrial isopod in the family Ligiidae, found in the United States. It is only known from a single location in Towns County, Georgia. The species name enotahensis refers to Enotah, the Cherokee name for the mountain Brasstown Bald, where the only specimens of Ligidium enotahensis have so far been collected. Its habitat consists of mixed forest leaf litter.

Ligidium enotahensis can be distinguished from closely related species by the squarish tip on the male second pleopod endopodite, without any projections or notches, and the very broad male first pleopod endopodite projection. The only known adult is 5.3 mm (0.21 in) long and 2.6 mm (0.10 in) wide.
