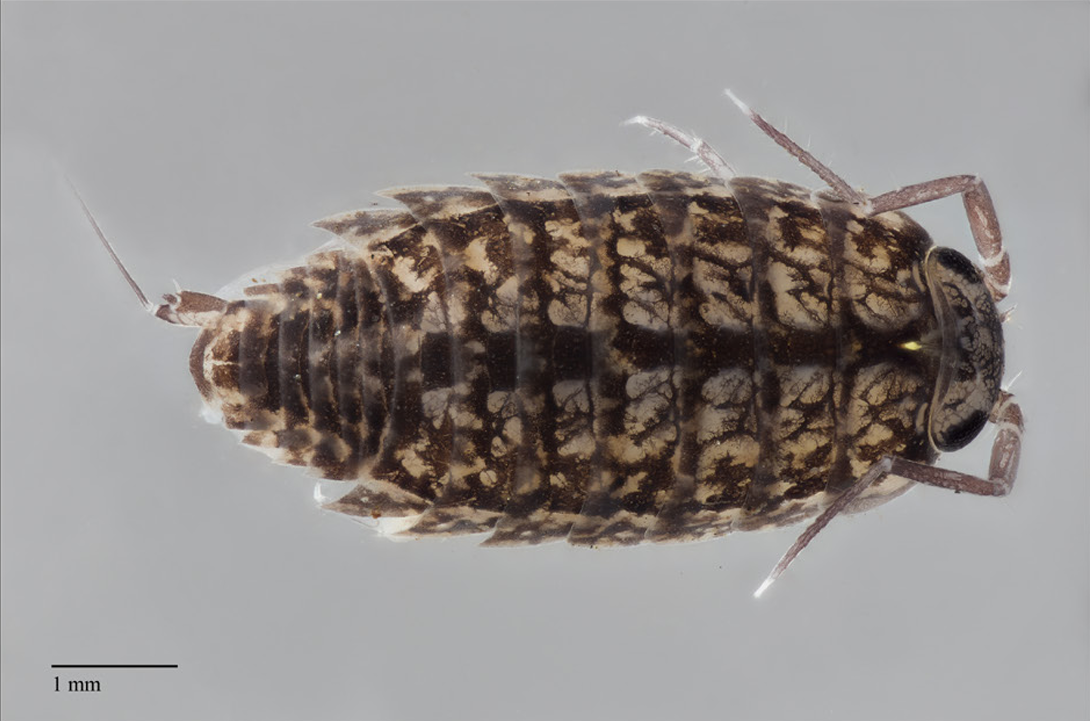

Scientific classification
- Kingdom: Animalia
- Phylum: Arthropoda
- Class: Malacostraca
- Order: Isopoda
- Suborder: Oniscidea
- Family: Ligiidae
- Genus: Ligidium
- Species: L. protuberans

Binomial name
- Ligidium protuberans Recuerdo & Caterino, 2025
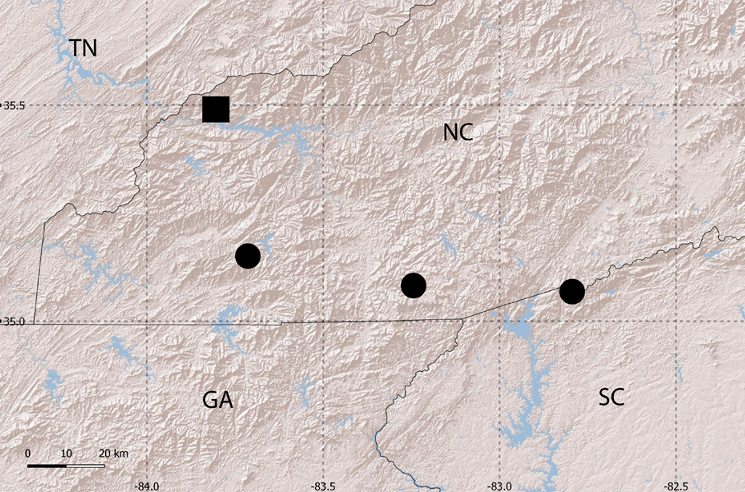
- Holotype location marked with a square, other known locations marked with circles

= Ligidium protuberans =

Species of woodlouse

Ligidium protuberans is a species of terrestrial isopod in the family Ligiidae, found in the United States. It is known from several locations in the southern Blue Ridge Mountains of North Carolina and South Carolina. The species name protuberans comes from Latin "protubero", meaning "protuberance", in reference to the species' characteristic projection on the male second pleopod endopodite.

Ligidium protuberans can be distinguished from closely related species by the male second pleopod endopodite distally broadened and rounded, with a small squarish projection. Males are 6.3–6.5 mm (0.25–0.26 in) in length and 2.8–3 mm (0.11–0.12 in) in width, and females are 6.8–8.6 mm (0.27–0.34 in) in length and 3.3–4.6 mm (0.13–0.18 in) in width.
