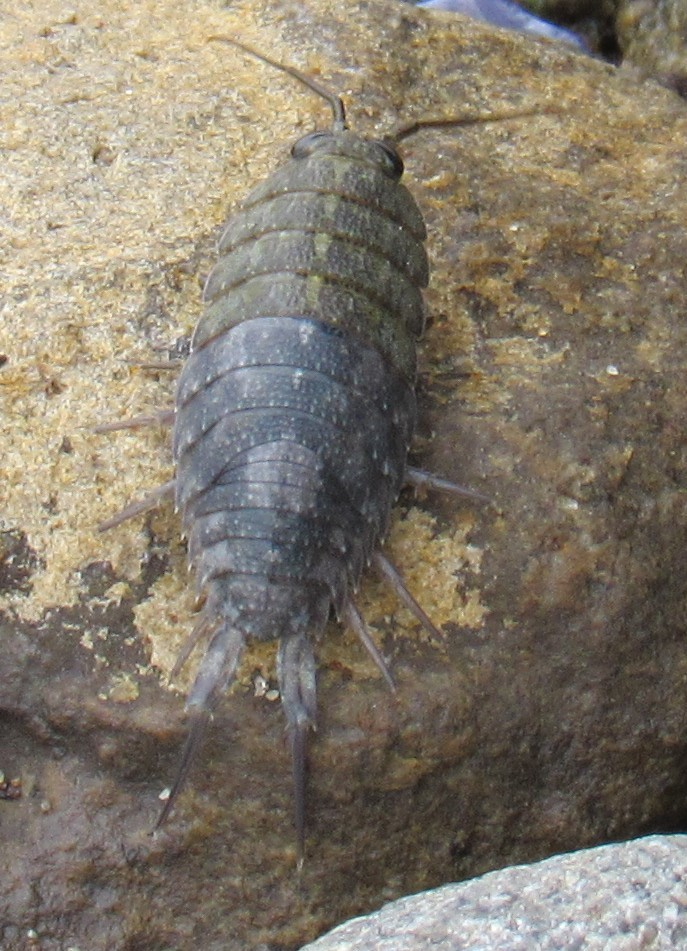

Scientific classification
- Kingdom: Animalia
- Phylum: Arthropoda
- Clade: Pancrustacea
- Class: Malacostraca
- Order: Isopoda
- Suborder: Oniscidea
- Family: Ligiidae
- Genus: Ligia
- Species: L. occidentalis

Binomial name
- Ligia occidentalis Dana, 1853

= Ligia occidentalis =

Species of crustacean

Ligia occidentalis, the western sea slater, is a species of isopod in the family Ligiidae. It lives on rocky shores along the Pacific coast of North America, in the splash zone just above the high tide line. It breathes through gills but spends almost all of its time out of the water. There has been DNA studies that have found evidence that shows there are multiple lineages within Ligia occidentalis meaning there could be multiple species that look alike instead of it just being one.

== Description ==
L. occidentalis looks a lot like Ligia pallasi, but the two species can be told apart by Ligia occidentalis’ longer uropods (the pair of tail appendages), its larger eyes set closer together, its skinnier body, and its tendency to jerk its body when messed with. It can also change color. The color comes from pigment cells called chromatophores, and Armitage (1960) studied how these cells behave in this species.

== Taxonomy ==
James Dwight Dana described the species in 1853. For a long time, sea slaters from central California to central Mexico were mostly reported as this one species.

DNA work changed that. Hurtado et al. (2010) sequenced two mitochondrial genes from isopods at 122 sites, including the Gulf of California. The populations split into many separate clades, mostly by geography, on the Baja California peninsula. Many lineages were at least 14% divergent in the COI gene from their closest relative, which is the smallest change seen between the Ligia species. The authors came to the conclusion that the area definitely holds several species. Because the species was first described from the San Francisco area, they made an educated guess that the central California clade is likely L. occidentalis itself. Markow and Pfeiler (2010) both found mitochondrial splits between the two ligia species in the isolated populations in the eastern Pacific.

Nobody noticed these lineages for so long as they looked the same. Santamaria et al. (2016) measured the body shape across the different Ligia and saw that there were many similarities in the shape of the ligias’, which alone could not reliably sort each animal into its own species. The species has not been formally split. Hurtado et al. (2010) concluded that its taxonomy needs revision.

== Distribution and habitat ==
Genetic surveys have sampled L. occidentalis on rocky shores from central California south to central Mexico, including the Gulf of California. BugGuide also lists an introduced population around Vancouver, British Columbia. It stays in a thin strip of the supralittoral zone and cannot survive long underwater, which limits its ability to spread across sandy beaches or open water to new rocky areas they haven't stepped foot on, which Hurtado et al. (2010) suggest is a reason why its populations drifted apart due to genetic changes from not mixing with other populations creating families.

Because L. occidentalis lives south and L. pallasii lives north, where they meet there's a mix of both. Eberl (2012) surveyed both along the coast. L. occidentalis was slightly less abundant toward the northern end of its range, but the drop was not statistically significant.

== Behavior and diet ==
During the day it hides in rock crevices or under stones just above the high tide line. It comes out to forage through the intertidal zone at night, and at low tide in cool weather. It is a scavenger and also eats microscopic algae. To breathe, it has to keep its gills wet, which it does by dipping the back of its abdomen into water. It handles water loss well, but it drowns if held underwater.
