= Ligia natalensis =

Scientific classification
- Kingdom: Animalia
- Phylum: Arthropoda
- Clade: Pancrustacea
- Class: Malacostraca
- Order: Isopoda
- Suborder: Oniscidea
- Family: Ligiidae
- Genus: Ligia
- Species: L. natalensis

Binomial name
- Ligia natalensis W. E. Collinge, 1920

Species of woodlouse

Ligia natalensis is an isopod in the family Ligiidae.

The type specimen for this species is held in the KwaZulu-Natal Museum in Pietermaritzburg, South Africa.

== Description ==
L. natalensis is silver-grey with darker grey markings. Its moderately convex body is twice as long as it is wide, 16–17 millimetres (0.63–0.67 in), with some bumps on the outer "shell"...neither as smooth as L. glabrata nor as granulated as L. diletada.

Its eyes are large and convex, and its long, thin antennae have five sections. The first three sections are short, and the last two are long. In females, the antennae are as long as the body, while the male's antennae are longer. The species' elongated uropods are slightly curved inward.

== Distribution ==
L. natalensis has been found along the waterline of KwaZulu-Natal, along the South Coast in South Africa.
