= Eoligiiscus =

Eoligiiscus Temporal range: Albian

Scientific classification
- Kingdom: Animalia
- Phylum: Arthropoda
- Class: Malacostraca
- Order: Isopoda
- Suborder: Oniscidea
- Family: Ligiidae
- Genus: †Eoligiiscus; Sánchez-García, Peñalver, Delclos & Engel, 2021
- Species: †E. tarraconensis

Binomial name
- †Eoligiiscus tarraconensis Sánchez-García, Peñalver, Delclos & Engel, 2021

Extinct genus of isopods

Eoligiiscus tarraconensis is an extinct species of woodlouse, the only species in the genus Eoligiiscus. It was found preserved in amber at the Peñacerrada I amber site in Burgos, Spain. The preserved specimens date from Late Albian period.

== Etymology ==
The genus name comes from Eos, the Greek goddess of dawn; the related genus Ligia; and the Greek suffix -iskos, commonly used in wooldlouse genera names. The species epithet comes from Roman province Hispania Tarraconensis; the site where the woodlouse was found lies within the historical boundaries of that province.
