= Ligidium gracile =

Scientific classification
- Kingdom: Animalia
- Phylum: Arthropoda
- Class: Malacostraca
- Order: Isopoda
- Suborder: Oniscidea
- Family: Ligiidae
- Genus: Ligidium
- Species: L. gracile

Binomial name
- Ligidium gracile (Dana, 1856)

Species of crustacean

Ligidium gracile is a species of rock slater in the family Ligiidae. It is found in North America.

== Subspecies ==
These two subspecies belong to the species Ligidium gracile:

- Ligidium gracile flavum Jackson, 1923
- Ligidium gracile gracile (Dana, 1856)
