= Ligia cursor =

Scientific classification
- Kingdom: Animalia
- Phylum: Arthropoda
- Clade: Pancrustacea
- Class: Malacostraca
- Order: Isopoda
- Suborder: Oniscidea
- Family: Ligiidae
- Genus: Ligia
- Species: L. cursor

Binomial name
- Ligia cursor Dana, 1853

Species of woodlouse

Ligia cursor is a woodlouse in the family Ligiidae.

The antennae are as long as the cephalothorax, which is the head and body of the animal. Its flagellum contains 21 segments, 14 larger and 7 smaller, and each joint shows setae (small bristles).

== Distribution ==
L. cursor was found on the United States Exploring Expedition of 1838–1842 under the command of Charles Wilkes, on the coast near Valparaíso, Chile.
