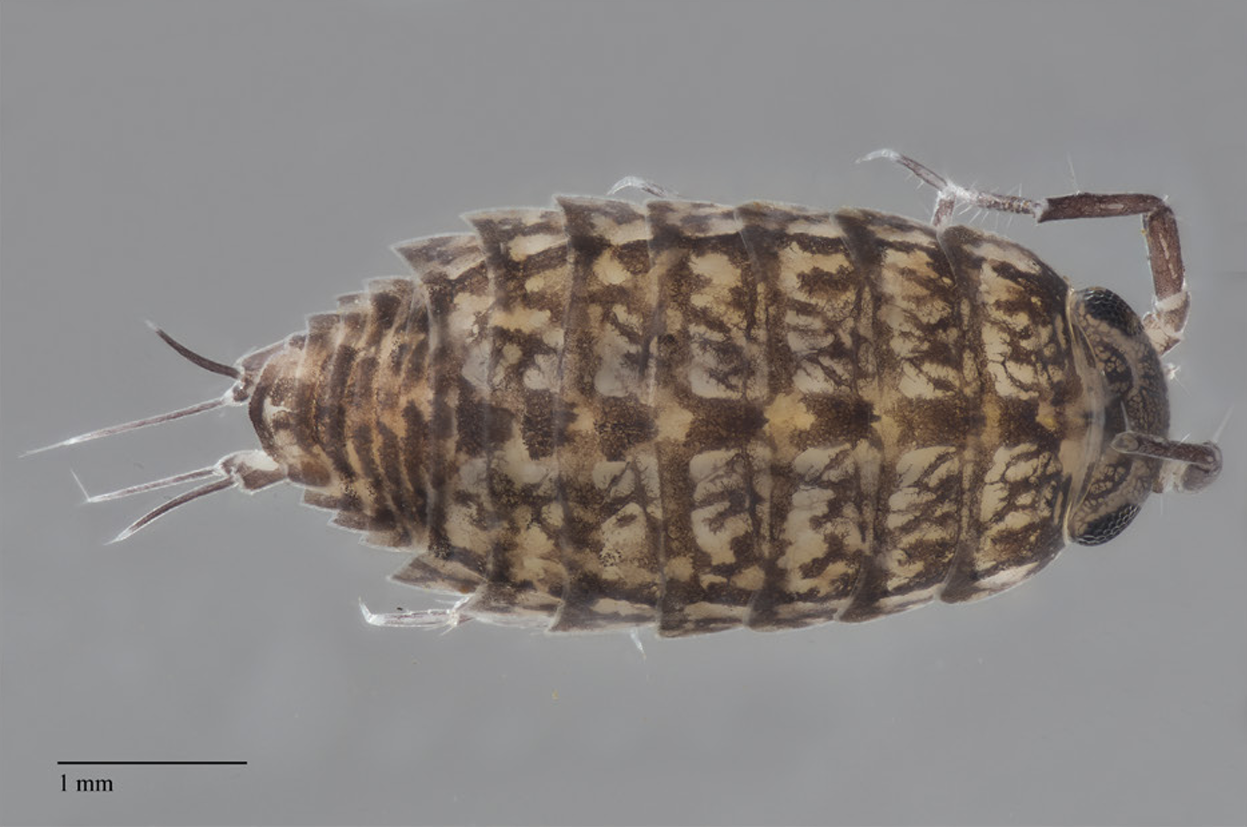

Scientific classification
- Kingdom: Animalia
- Phylum: Arthropoda
- Class: Malacostraca
- Order: Isopoda
- Suborder: Oniscidea
- Family: Ligiidae
- Genus: Ligidium
- Species: L. whiteoak

Binomial name
- Ligidium whiteoak Recuerdo & Caterino, 2025

= Ligidium whiteoak =

Species of woodlouse

Ligidium whiteoak is a species of terrestrial isopod in the family Ligiidae, found in the United States. It is only known from a single location in Blount County, Tennessee. The species name whiteoak refers to Whiteoak Sink, a trail within Great Smoky Mountains National Park, where the species was first discovered. Its habitat consists of moist leaf litter in deciduous forest.

Ligidium whiteoak can be distinguished from closely related species by the second male pleopod endopodite showing a broad projection, rising dorsally and medially from the caudal margin of the tip and projecting caudally and slightly outwards. The size of adult males ranges from 4.9–5.5 mm (0.19–0.22 in) in length and 2.3–2.5 mm (0.091–0.098 in) in width, and the size of adult females ranges from 4.9–5.0 mm (0.19–0.20 in) in length and 2.4–2.6 mm (0.094–0.102 in) in width.
