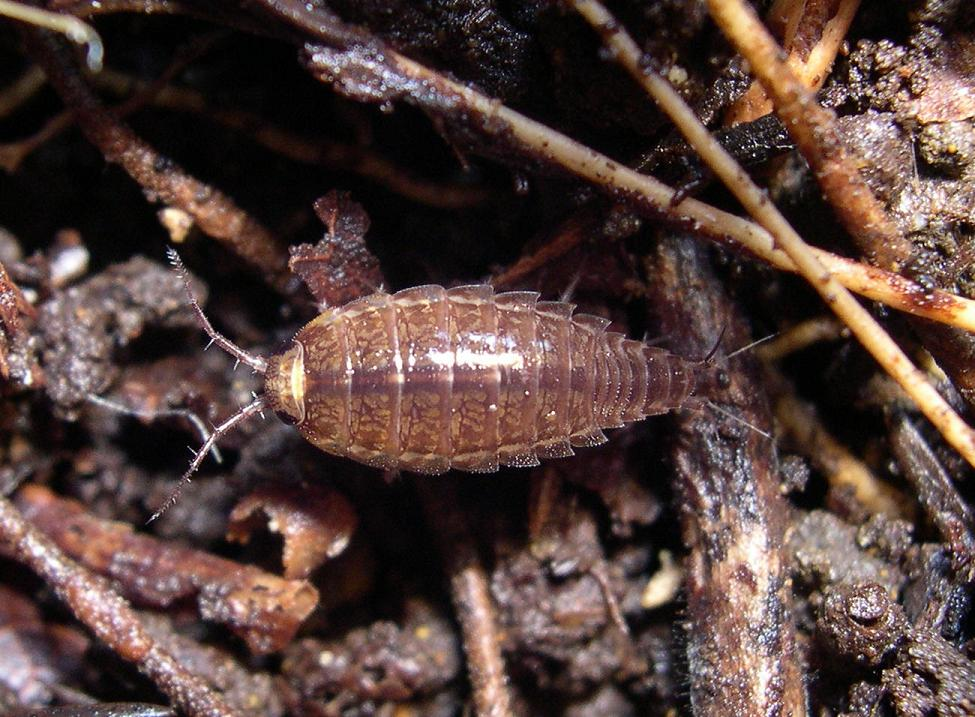

Scientific classification
- Kingdom: Animalia
- Phylum: Arthropoda
- Class: Malacostraca
- Order: Isopoda
- Suborder: Oniscidea
- Family: Ligiidae
- Genus: Ligidium
- Species: L. japonicum

Binomial name
- Ligidium japonicum Verhoeff, 1918

= Ligidium japonicum =

Species of woodlouse

Ligidium japonicum is a species of woodlouse found in moist forests in Japan. Individuals may live for up to two years and reach a length of 8 millimetres (0.31 in).
