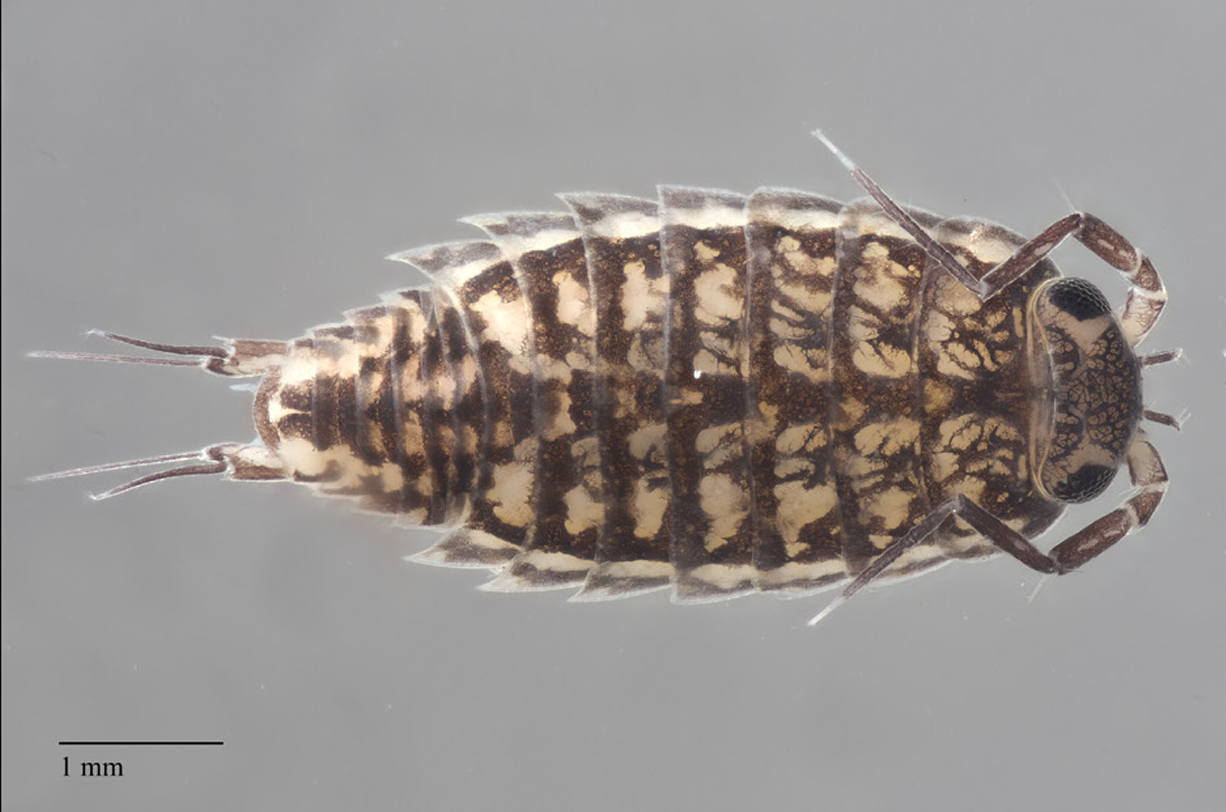

Scientific classification
- Kingdom: Animalia
- Phylum: Arthropoda
- Class: Malacostraca
- Order: Isopoda
- Suborder: Oniscidea
- Family: Ligiidae
- Genus: Ligidium
- Species: L. pacolet

Binomial name
- Ligidium pacolet Recuerdo & Caterino, 2025

= Ligidium pacolet =

Species of woodlouse

Ligidium pacolet is a species of terrestrial isopod in the family Ligiidae, found in the United States. It is only known from a single location in Polk County, North Carolina. The species name pacolet refers to the North Pacolet River, near where the only specimens of the species have so far been collected. Its habitat consists of moist leaf litter in deciduous forest.

Ligidium pacolet can be distinguished from closely related species by the male second pleopod endopodite showing a soft, long, and slender projection rising ventrally in the distal margin of the tip, close to its inner corner, and projected inwards. The size of adult males ranges from 5.5–6.1 mm (0.22–0.24 in) in length and 2.6–2.9 mm (0.10–0.11 in) in width, and the size of the only known adult female is 7.9 mm (0.31 in) in length and 3.6 mm (0.14 in) in length.
