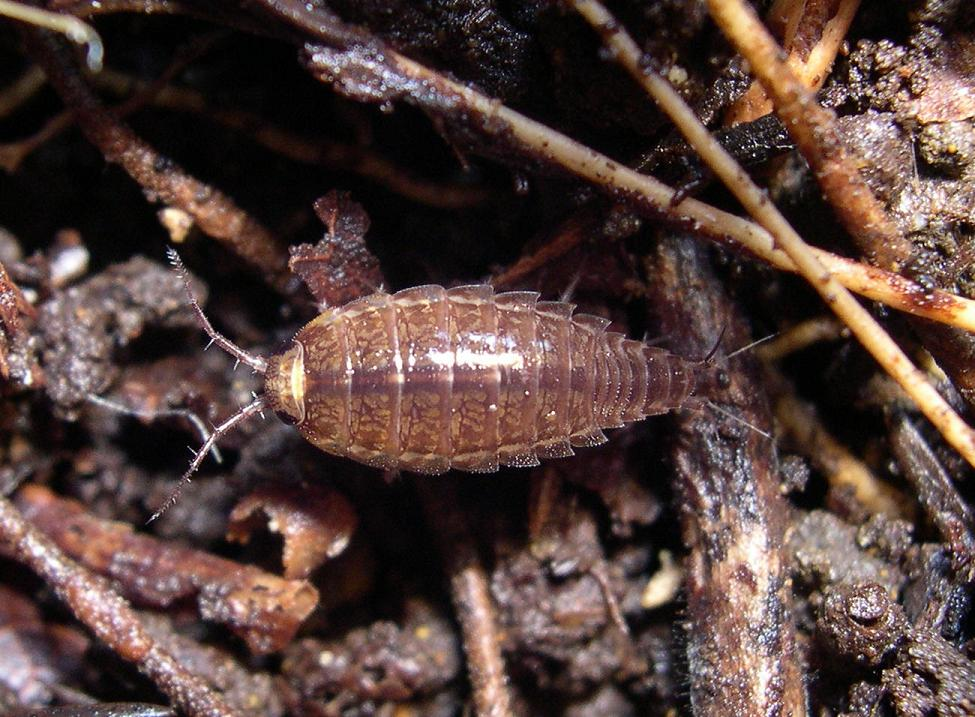
- Ligidium japonicum

Scientific classification
- Kingdom: Animalia
- Phylum: Arthropoda
- Class: Malacostraca
- Order: Isopoda
- Suborder: Oniscidea
- Family: Ligiidae
- Genus: Ligidium; Brandt, 1833

Species
- See text

= Ligidium =

Genus of woodlice

Ligidium is a genus of woodlice. It contains about 68 species, six of which are probably taxonomic synonyms of Ligidium hypnorum or Ligidium germanicum. Of the remainder, 18 species are found in North America, six in Japan, two in Taiwan, four in China, 12 in Turkey, the Caucasus, and Central Asia, and six in Greece.

The following is an incomplete list of Ligidium species:

- Ligidium acuminatum Li, 2022
- Ligidium acutitelson Wang & Kwon, 1993
- Ligidium anatolicum Frankenberger, 1950
- Ligidium assimile Strouhal, 1971
- Ligidium beieri Strouhal, 1928
- Ligidium birsteini Borutzky, 1950
- Ligidium blueridgensis Schultz, 1964
- Ligidium bosniense Verhoeff, 1901
- Ligidium bosporanum Verhoeff, 1941
- Ligidium burmanicum Verhoeff, 1946
- Ligidium cavaticum Borutzky, 1950
- Ligidium chatoogaensis Schultz, 1970
- Ligidium cycladicum Matsakis, 1978
- Ligidium denticulatum Shen, 1949
- Ligidium duospinatum Li, 2022
- Ligidium elrodii (Packard, 1873)
- Ligidium enotahensis Recuero & Caterino, 2025
- Ligidium euboicum Matsakis, 1975
- Ligidium floridanum Schultz & Johnson, 1984
- Ligidium formosanum Wang & Kwon, 1993
- Ligidium fragile Budde-Lund, 1885
- Ligidium gadalutsi Recuero & Caterino, 2025
- Ligidium germanicum Verhoeff, 1901
- Ligidium ghigii Arcangeli, 1928
- Ligidium gracile (Dana, 1854)
- Ligidium hancockensis Schultz, 1970
- Ligidium hoberlandti Frankenberger, 1950
- Ligidium hypnorum (Cuvier, 1792)
- Ligidium inerme Nunomura & Xie, 2000
- Ligidium intermedium Radu, 1950
- Ligidium iyoense Nunomura, 1983
- Ligidium japonicum Verhoeff, 1918
- Ligidium jiushai Tang & Zhou, 1999
- Ligidium kiyosumiense Nunomura, 1983
- Ligidium kofoidi Maloney, 1930
- Ligidium koreanum Flasarová, 1972
- Ligidium lapetum Mulaik & Mulaik, 1942
- Ligidium longisetosum Verhoeff & Strouhal, 1967
- Ligidium margaritae Borutzky, 1955
- Ligidium mimense Nunomura & Xie, 2000
- Ligidium mucronatum Mulaik & Mulaik, 1942
- Ligidium mylonasi Sfenthourakis, 1992
- Ligidium nantahala Recuero & Caterino, 2025
- Ligidium nodulosum Verhoeff, 1918
- Ligidium pacolet Recuero & Caterino, 2025
- Ligidium paulum Nunomura, 1976
- Ligidium protuberans Recuero & Caterino, 2025
- Ligidium riparum Verhoeff, 1943
- Ligidium rotundum Li, 2022
- Ligidium ryukyuense Nunomura, 1983
- Ligidium schultzi Recuero & Caterino, 2025
- Ligidium scottensis Schultz, 1970
- Ligidium shadini Borutzky, 1948
- Ligidium sichuanensis Nunomura, 2002
- Ligidium tauricum Verhoeff, 1930
- Ligidium turcicorum Verhoeff, 1949
- Ligidium tridentatum Li, 2022
- Ligidium werneri Strouhal, 1937
- Ligidium whiteoak Recuero & Caterino, 2025
- Ligidium zaitzevi Borutzky, 1950
- Ligidium zernovi Borutzky, 1948
