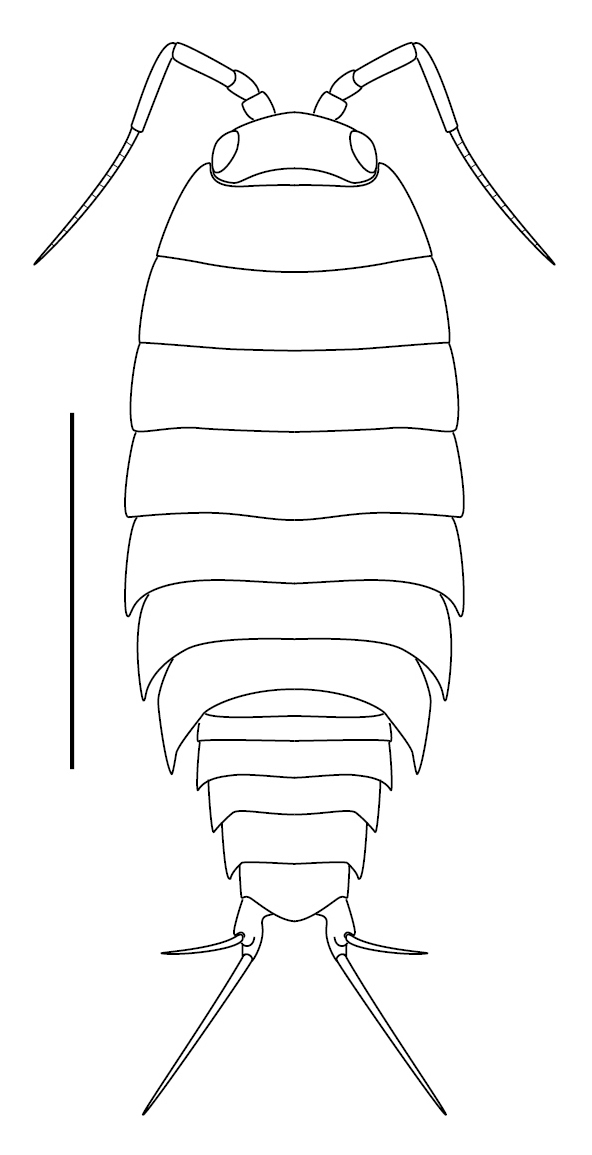

Scientific classification
- Kingdom: Animalia
- Phylum: Arthropoda
- Class: Malacostraca
- Order: Isopoda
- Suborder: Oniscidea
- Family: Ligiidae
- Genus: Ligidium
- Species: L. elrodii

Binomial name
- Ligidium elrodii (Packard, 1873)

= Ligidium elrodii =

Species of crustacean

Ligidium elrodii is a species of rock slater in the family Ligiidae found in North America.

== Subspecies ==
These five subspecies belong to the species L. elrodii:

- L. e. chatoogaensis Schultz, 1970
- L. e. elrodii (Packard, 1873)
- L. e. hancockensis Schultz, 1970
- L. e. leensis Schultz, 1970
- L. e. scottensis Schultz, 1970
