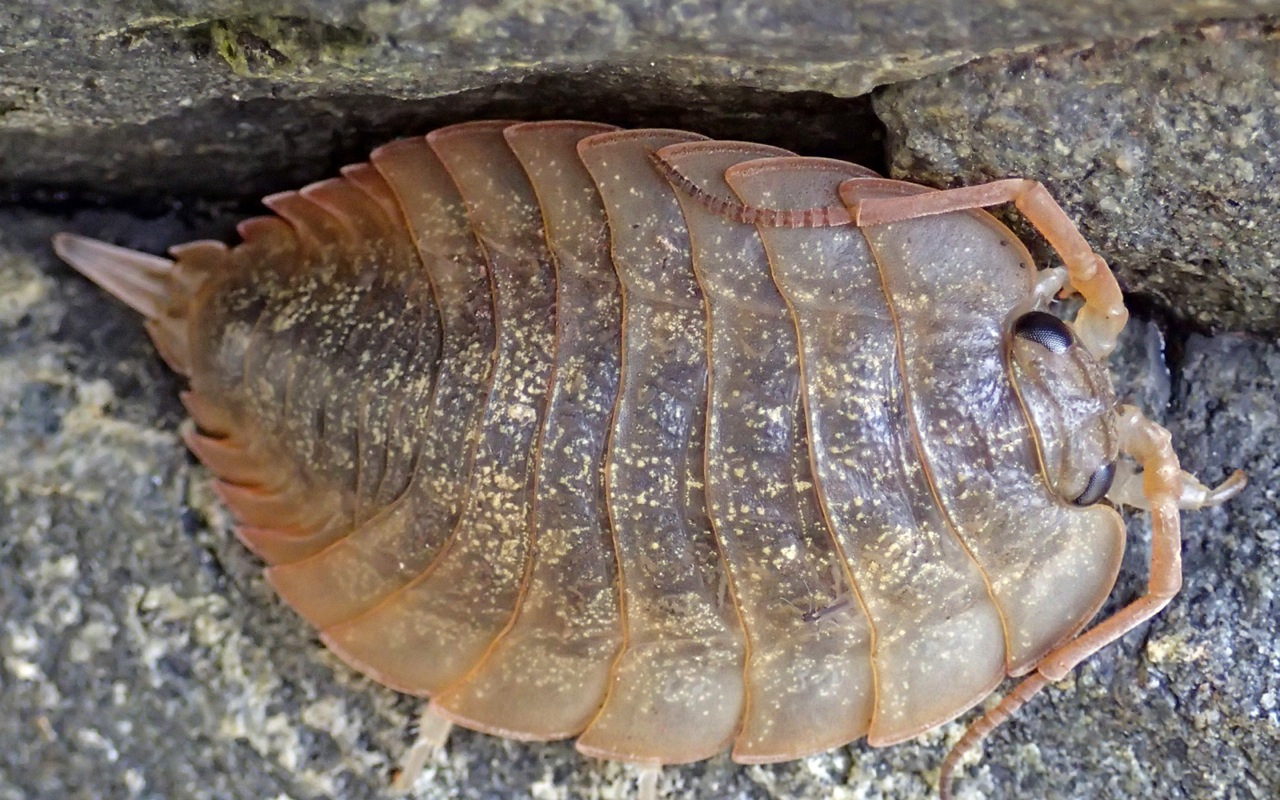

Scientific classification
- Kingdom: Animalia
- Phylum: Arthropoda
- Class: Malacostraca
- Order: Isopoda
- Suborder: Oniscidea
- Family: Ligiidae
- Genus: Ligia
- Species: L. pallasii

Binomial name
- Ligia pallasii Brandt, 1833

= Ligia pallasii =

Species of crustacean

Ligia pallasii, the sleepy sea slater, is a species of isopod in the family Ligiidae. It is one of the largest sea slaters. It is found along the Pacific coast of North America from the Aleutian Islands to northern California.
