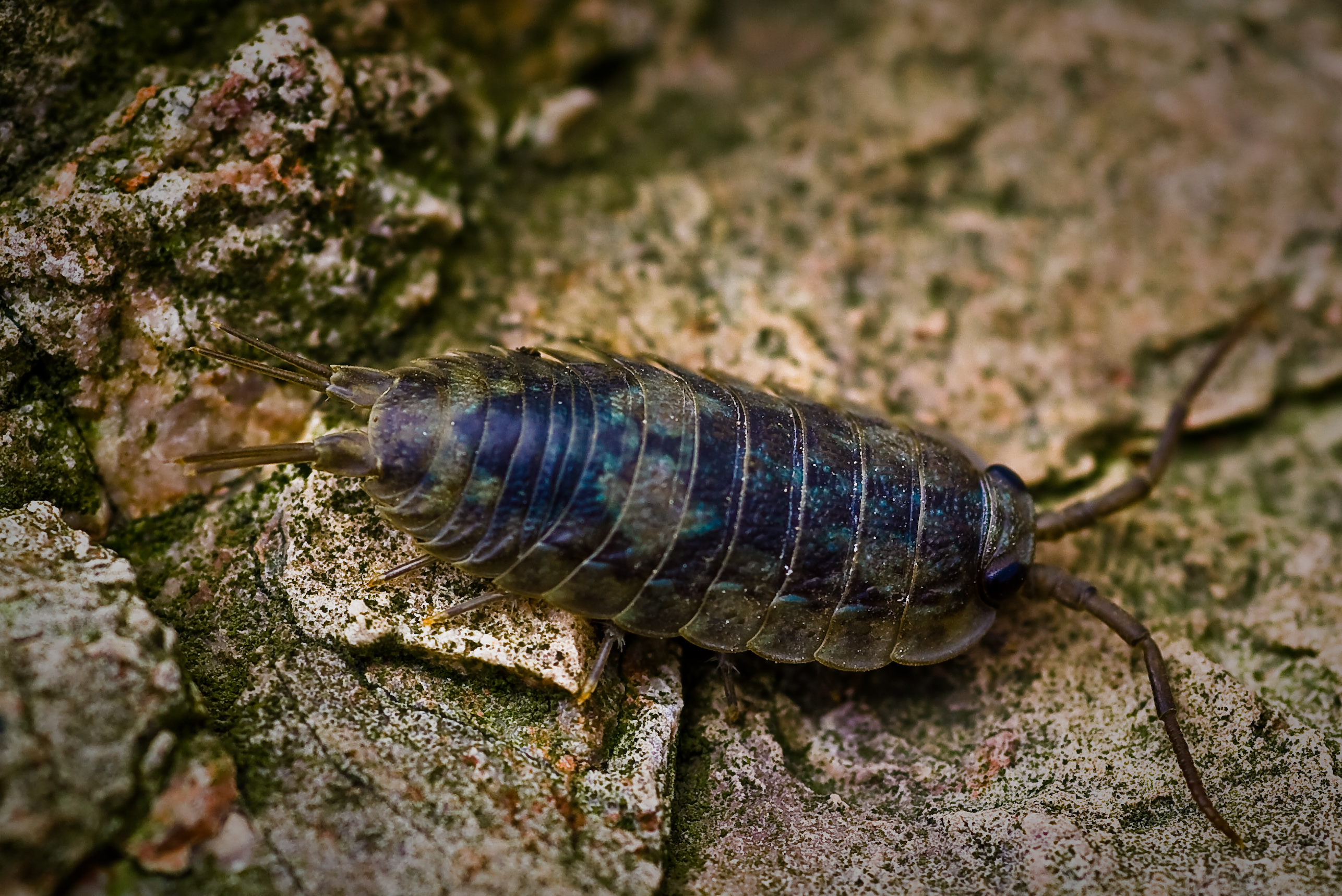
- Ligia oceanica

Scientific classification
- Kingdom: Animalia
- Phylum: Arthropoda
- Clade: Pancrustacea
- Class: Malacostraca
- Order: Isopoda
- Suborder: Oniscidea
- Family: Ligiidae
- Genus: Ligia; Fabricius, 1798

Type species
- Ligia oceanica Linnaeus, 1767

= Ligia =

Genus of woodlice

Ligia is a genus of isopods, commonly known as rock lice or sea slaters, in the family Ligiidae. Most Ligia species live in tidal zone cliffs and rocky beaches, but there are several fully terrestrial species which occur in high-humidity environments.

== Ecology ==
Coastal Ligia species exhibit a mixture of terrestrial and marine characteristics, drying out easily, needing moist air and proximity to water to retain water. While they have gills and can exchange gas under water, they only do so when escaping terrestrial predators or being dislodged by wave action. They do not move swiftly in the water and are open to marine predation. They are well adapted to rocky surfaces and avoid sand, which opens them to terrestrial predation and desiccation.

== Taxonomy ==
Authorities place this genus in the suborder Oniscidea based on morphology. Phylogenetic analysis based on molecular data, however, suggest that Ligia is more closely related to the marine isopods in the suborders Valvifera and Sphaeromatidea than to the terrestrial woodlice in the suborder Oniscidea.

== Species ==
Species separation is at times difficult because of sexual dimorphism. For example, males usually have longer and wider antennae than females. The males also tend to be larger but narrower, with the difference sometimes attributed to the female's brood pouch. Complicating matters is the possible existence of cryptic species in the genus.

This is a list of all Ligia species contained in A Bibliography of Terrestrial Isopods:

- Ligia australiensis – Australian slater, Australia, including Tasmania and Lord Howe Island
- Ligia baudiniana – east and west coasts of the Americas
- Ligia boninensis – Bonin Islands, Japan
- Ligia cajennensis – French Guiana
- Ligia cinerascens – Hokkaido and northern Honshu, Japan, and the Kuril Islands
- Ligia cursor – Chile
- Ligia curvata – Angola
- Ligia dante – Hawaiʻi Island (Hawaii)
- Ligia dentipes – Andaman and Nicobar Islands, Indonesia
- Ligia dilatata – southern Africa (Namibia and South Africa)
- Ligia eleluensis – Maui, Hawaii
- Ligia exotica – wharf roach, introduced around the world in subtropical and warm temperate coastlines
- Ligia ferrarai – Madagascar
- Ligia filicornis – Venezuela
- Ligia glabrata – Southern Africa (Namibia and South Africa)
- Ligia gracilipes – west coast of Africa, Senegal to northern Angola
- Ligia hachijoensis – Izu Islands, Japan
- Ligia hawaiensis – Kaua'i, Hawaii
- Ligia honu – Hawaii Island, Hawaii
- Ligia italica – coasts of the Black Sea, Mediterranean Sea, Atlantic in northern Africa downsouth to Cape Verde and Macaronesia Islands
- Ligia kamehameha – Hawaii Island, Hawaii
- Ligia latissima – New Caledonia
- Ligia litigiosa – Chile and Peru and the Juan Fernández Islands
- Ligia malleata – Tanzania
- Ligia mauinuiensis – Maui Nui Islands and Oahu, Hawaii
- Ligia miyakensis – Izu Islands, Japan
- Ligia natalensis – southeastern coast of South Africa from Knysna to Natal
- Ligia novizealandiae – New Zealand and Kermadec Island
- Ligia occidentalis – California, Baja California, British Columbia
- Ligia oceanica – Atlantic Coasts of Europe, coasts of western Baltic Sea and possibly introduced to the Atlantic Coast of North America
- Ligia pallasii – Pacific Coast of North America, the Aleutian Islands to Santa Cruz, California
- Ligia pallida – Christmas Island in Polynesia
- Ligia pele – Maui, Hawaiʻi
- Ligia perkinsi – Kaua'i and O'ahu, Hawaiian Islands
- Ligia persica – Persian Gulf
- Ligia philoscoides – southeastern Polynesia
- Ligia pigmentata – Red Sea, Persian Gulf and coast of Somalia
- Ligia platycephala – Venezuela, Guyana and Trinidad
- Ligia rolliensis – Oahu, Hawaiʻi
- Ligia rugosa – southeastern Polynesia
- Ligia ryukyuensis – Japan
- Ligia saipanensi – Saipan Island, Micronesia
- Ligia simoni – Northern Venezuela and northern Colombia
- Ligia taiwanensis – Taiwan
- Ligia vitiensis – Sulawesi, Singapore, New Guinea, Melanesia, Polynesia, and possibly introduced to Somalia
- Ligia yamanishii – Tokyo
- Ligia yemenica – Gulf of Aden
