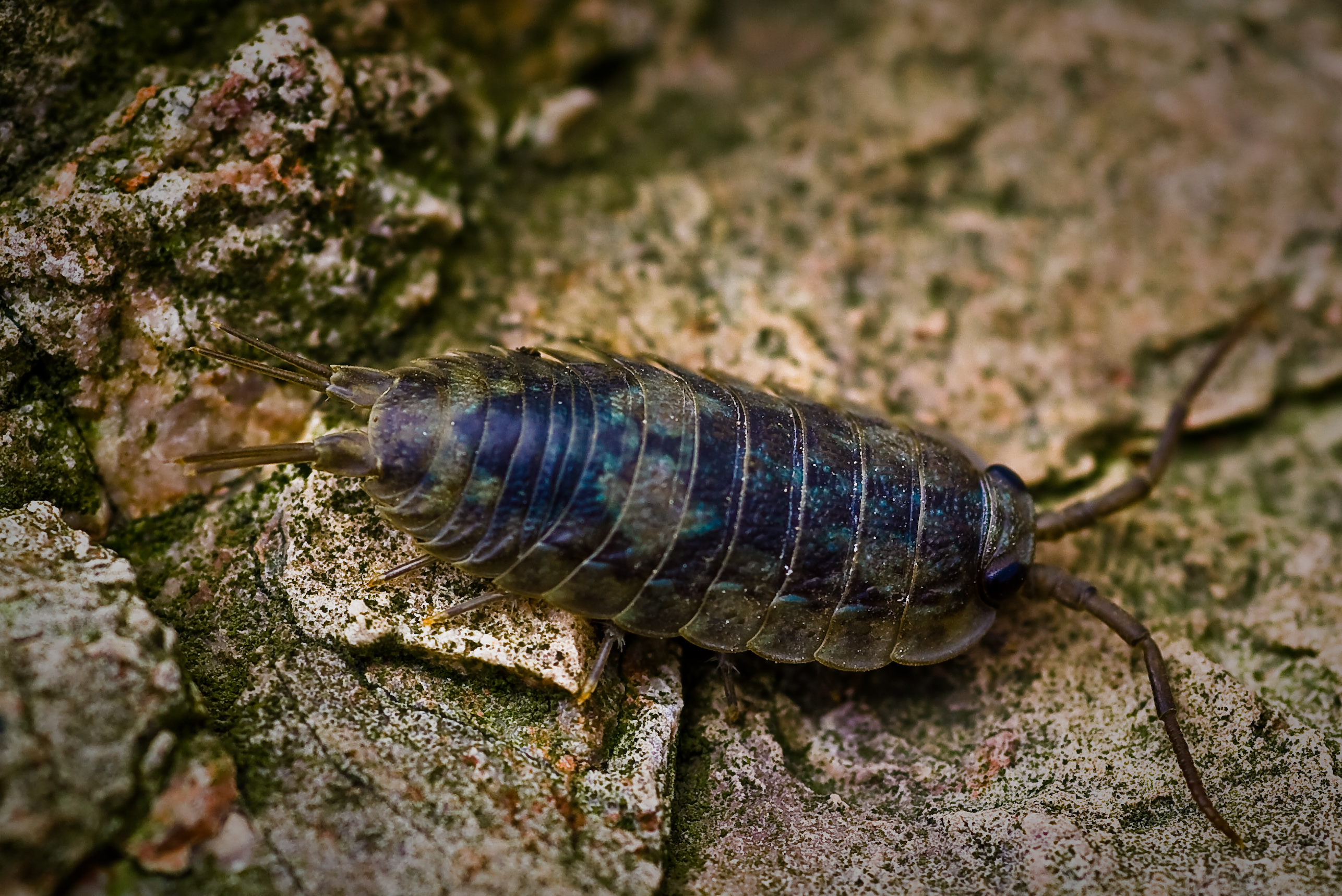

Scientific classification
- Kingdom: Animalia
- Phylum: Arthropoda
- Clade: Pancrustacea
- Class: Malacostraca
- Order: Isopoda
- Suborder: Oniscidea
- Family: Ligiidae
- Genus: Ligia
- Species: L. oceanica

Binomial name
- Ligia oceanica (Linnaeus, 1767)

Synonyms
- Oniscus oceanicus Linnaeus, 1767; Ligia belgica Ritzema Bos, 1874; Ligia granulata Frey & Leuckart, 1847; Ligia oniscoides Brébisson, 1825; Ligia scopulorum Leach, 1814; Ligydia oceanica (Linnaeus, 1767); Oniscus assimilis Linnaeus, 1767

= Ligia oceanica =

Species of woodlouse

Ligia oceanica, the sea slater, common sea slater, or sea roach, is a species of isopod in the family Ligiidae. This isopod lives in the littoral zone and is abundant on the rocky shores of the North Sea, the western Baltic Sea, and the Atlantic coasts of Europe. This isopod is the largest species in the suborder Oniscidea, reaching 35 mm in length. Phylogenetic analysis based on molecular data, however, casts doubt on the placement of this species in that suborder, suggesting that the genus Ligia is more closely related to the marine isopods in the suborders Valvifera and Sphaeromatidea than to the terrestrial woodlice in the suborder Oniscidea.

== Description ==
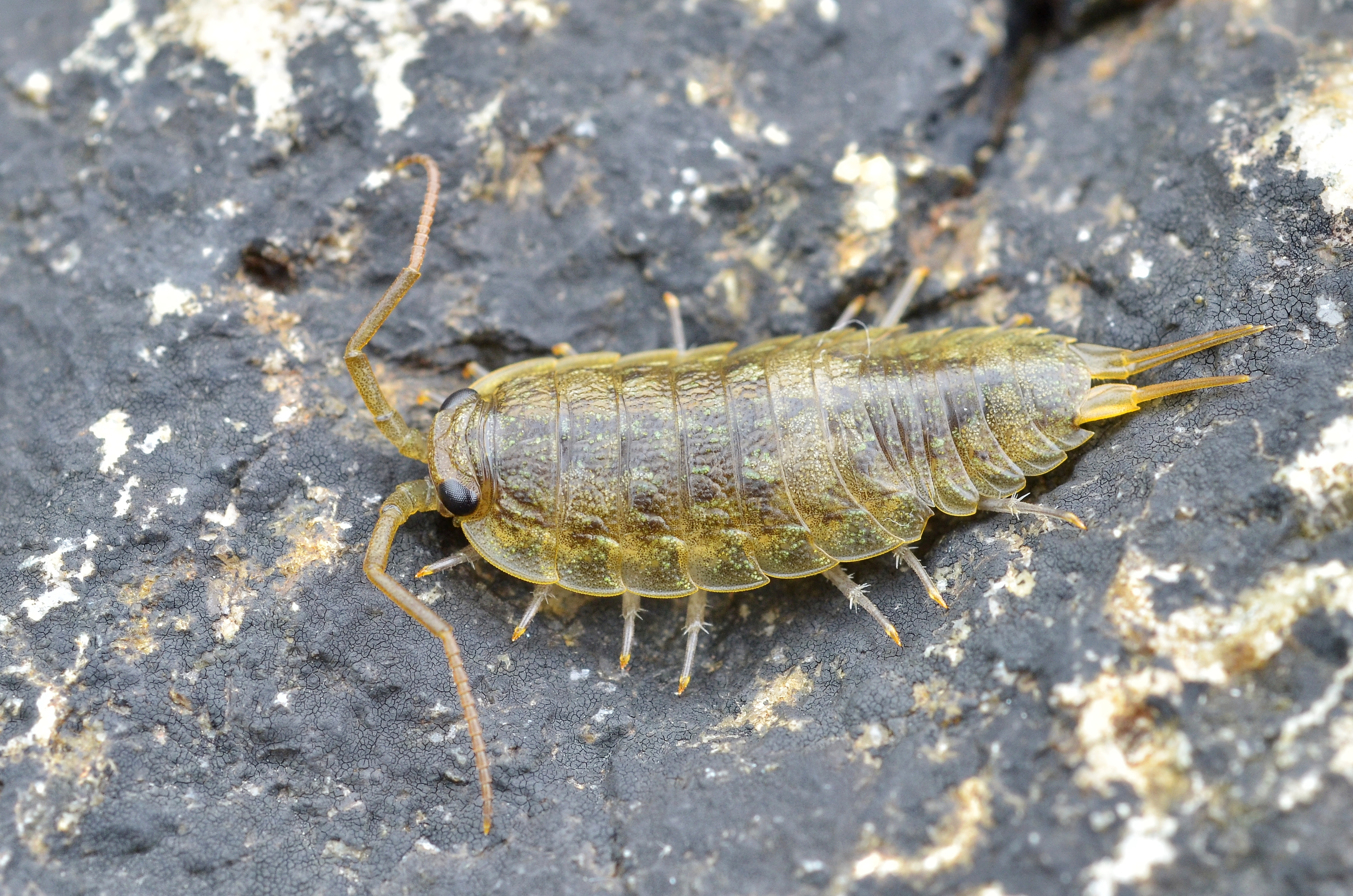
Ligia oceanica, Fort-la-Latte, Plévenon, Bretagne, France

This species has a flat body that is shaped like an oval that is widest in the middle and twice as long as broad. This isopod can range from 20 mm to 35 mm in length and from brown to slate grey or olive green in color. The head is wider than long, with a width/length ratio of about 1.5 and a rounded anterior margin. The head features a pair of large compound eyes with more than 40 ommatidia. This head also features a pair of long antennae that are two-thirds as long as the body. The flagellum at the distal end of each of these antennae features 12 to 14 bead-like segments.

Behind the head are seven thoracic segments. The adult of this species features seven similar pairs of legs that are all used for walking. The telson features pointed lateral corners on the posterior margin. Two long uropods extend from this posterior margin, each about one-quarter the length of the body and each forked into two branches for the distal half.

== Distribution ==
The native range of this species extends along the northeast Atlantic coast from southern Norway to Morocco and into the western Baltic Sea as far as the island of Bornholm in Denmark and the city of Rostock in Germany. This species has also been recorded on the Faroe Islands and the southern coast of Iceland. This isopod has been introduced not only to the Atlantic coast of North America, where this species is found from Cape Cod to Maine, but also to the Azores and the Canary Islands. Humans have probably transported this species overseas in cargo or in the ballast of ships. Although common in Europe, this species seems to be rare in North America.

== Ecology and habitat ==
This species is found where the substrate of the littoral zone is rocky, such as on boulder beaches, at the base of rock cliffs, or on harbor walls or jetties. This isopod is especially common in crevices and rock pools and under stones. These isopods rely on the shelter of rocks or seawalls for temperature control and moisture, but they can tolerate temperatures near freezing in the winter. This isopod breathes air and avoids immersion in water. The vertical range of this species is limited to a narrow region of the shore from the splash zone to a few meters higher.

This species is furtive and nocturnal, hiding in crevices by day and coming out at night to feed. This isopod is also fast, nimble, and hard to catch. This species feeds on green and brown algae, especially bladderwrack (Fucus vesiculosus), as well as on diatoms, decaying seaweed, and plant detritus. These isopods are likely prey for shorebirds, rats, and raccoons.

== Reproduction and development ==
These isopods breed during the spring and summer. Individuals live for 2.5 to 3 years and usually breed only once. In England, a female can produce 50 to 120 eggs, with larger females producing larger broods. Although the embryo develops legs before its release from the brood pouch (marsupium) of the female, the first free-living juvenile (manca) stage lacks the last leg pair found in adults.

== Phylogeny ==
Multiple studies based on molecular data suggest that species of Ligia are more closely related to the marine isopods in the suborders Valvifera and Sphaeromatidea than to the terrestrial woodlice in the suborder Oniscidea. This evidence places the genus Ligia in a clade with these marine isopods on a branch separate from other Oniscidea genera in a phylogenetic tree of isopods, indicating that the suborder Oniscidea as currently defined based on morphology is polyphyletic rather than monophyletic. This evidence also suggests that L. oceanica and the other species of Ligia represent a transition from the marine to the terrestrial environment that is entirely separate from the invasion of the land by the ancestors of the other genera in Oniscidea.

Phylogenetic analysis based on molecular data also indicates that the species L. oceanica includes two distinct clades in Europe, a southern lineage and a northern lineage. The southern lineage is found from the peninsula of Brittany in France to Spain, whereas the northern lineage is found from Brittany and the British Isles to the Netherlands, Germany, and Norway. These two lineages probably diverged during the period from the late Pliocene to the mid Pleistocene.

== Mitochondrial genome ==
The mitochondrial genome of L. oceanica, which was sequenced in 2006, suggests a close relationship between this species and the suborder Valvifera. This genome is a circular, double-stranded DNA molecule, with a size of 15,289 base pairs. Although gene order is not conserved among isopods, L. oceanica shows a similarly derived gene order to the species Idotea balthica, a marine isopod in the suborder Valvifera, compared to the arthropod ground pattern, but the positions of three tRNA genes differ in the two isopod species.

== See also ==
- List of woodlice of the British Isles
