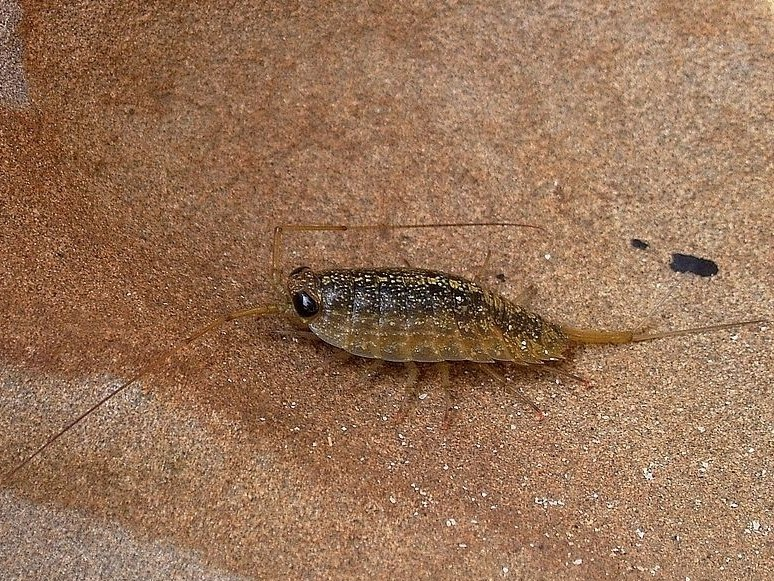

Scientific classification
- Kingdom: Animalia
- Phylum: Arthropoda
- Clade: Pancrustacea
- Class: Malacostraca
- Order: Isopoda
- Suborder: Oniscidea
- Family: Ligiidae
- Genus: Ligia
- Species: L. exotica

Binomial name
- Ligia exotica Roux, 1828

= Ligia exotica =

Species of woodlouse

In Japan

Ligia exotica, also called sea roach or wharf roach, is a woodlouse sea slater in the family Ligiidae. It is found in various parts of the world living on rocky coasts and harbour walls just above high water mark.

== Description ==
Ligia exotica can grow to 4 centimetres (1.6 inches) in length, with the males being rather bigger than the females. The general colour is dark grey, sometimes with brown flecks, and the appendages are pale brown. The head has a pair of long antennae which exceed the length of the body, and two unstalked, bulging eyes. The body is flattened dorsally and has seven thoracic segments, each with a pair of legs, and six abdominal segments. The first five of these bear flat, membranous gills and the sixth bears a pair of long, forked uropods.

== Distribution and habitat ==
Ligia exotica is believed to be native to the coasts of Western Europe and the Mediterranean Sea. Other authorities suggest it originated in the Pacific and Indian Oceans. The fact that Roux gave it the specific name "exotica" when he first described the species in 1828 from near Marseille, may indicate that it was not previously known in that locality. It has spread to many other temperate and subtropical parts of the world including the Red Sea, the eastern seaboard of the United States and Hawaii. It is thought that the spread occurred unintentionally via shipping, either in ballast or between the planks of timber ships. Its natural habitat is rocks and cliffs in the splash zone just above high water mark where it lives in damp crevices. It is also found, sometimes in large numbers, on jetties and harbour walls.

== Biology ==
Ligia exotica is both a grazer on microalgae and diatoms and a scavenger on plant remains and detritus. In the eastern United States, where it is considered to be invasive, it seems to be the dominant invertebrate in its habitat. The impact of this on competing organisms and its contribution to the diet of predators has not been properly evaluated, however the NEMESIS database suggests it is not likely to be of much significance.

Individual Ligia exotica are either male or female. Fertilization is internal and eggs are laid in batches of about eighty in moist cracks and fissures. Females often carry their eggs around with them using specially adapted appendages. The larvae develop into juveniles which go through a number of moults before becoming adult.

Ligia exotica has a passive water transportation system through open capillaries in its legs.
