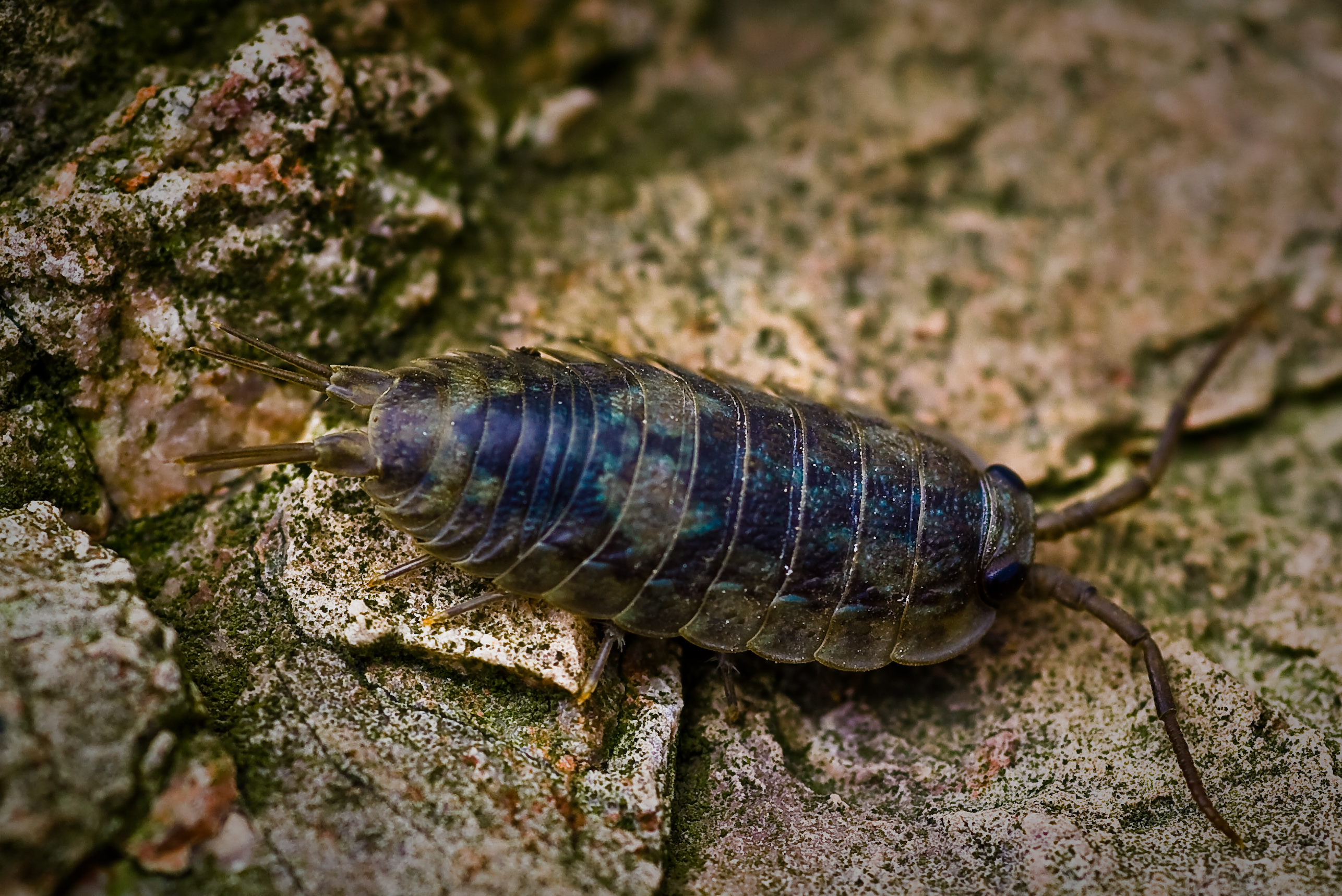
- Ligia oceanica
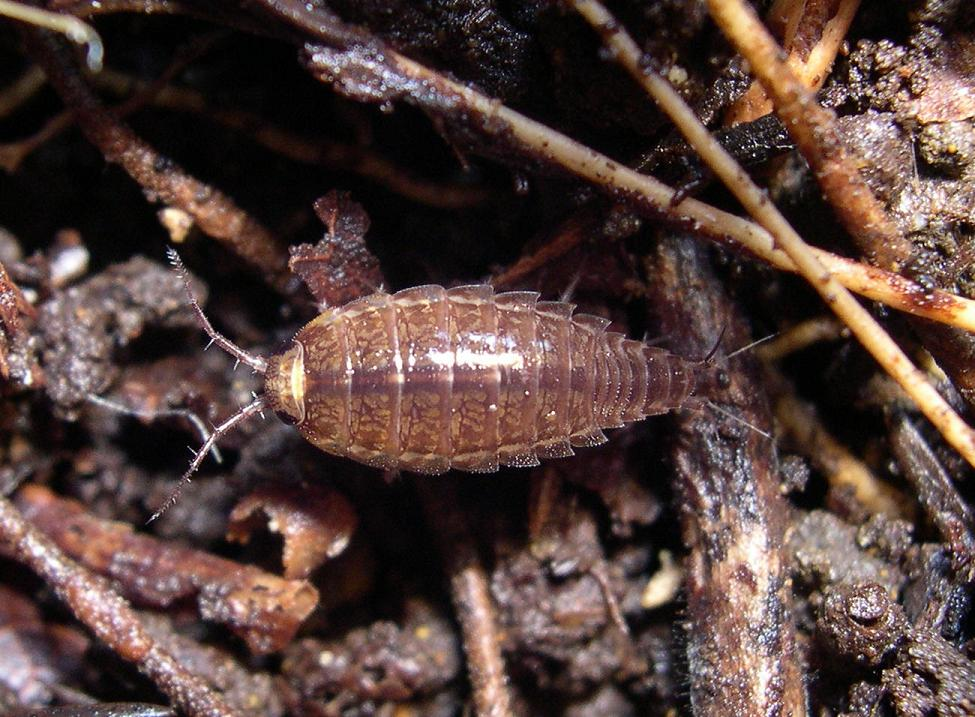
- Ligidium japonicum

Scientific classification
- Kingdom: Animalia
- Phylum: Arthropoda
- Clade: Pancrustacea
- Class: Malacostraca
- Order: Isopoda
- Suborder: Oniscidea
- Infraorder: Ligiamorpha
- Section: Diplocheta; Vandel, 1957
- Family: Ligiidae; Leach, 1814

= Ligiidae =

Family of woodlice

Ligiidae is a family of woodlice, the only family in the infraorder Diplocheta. The family is considered ancient, diverging early from other extant woodlouse taxa.

== Description ==
Potential traits uniting the family Ligiidae include a very wide articulation insertion for pleopod 1, with the arthropodal membrane only present on the posterior/dorsal side of the joint, the presence of a large muscle in the pleopod 2 protopod, the absence of a specific muscle in the pleon, and the reduction of the last segment of the already very small first antennae.

== Ecology ==
The genus Ligia occurs on seashores worldwide, with cryptic species often occurring across very restricted stretches of coastline. Members of the genus Ligidium occur in semiterrestrial environments in Eurasia and North America, usually in damp leaf litter and near streams, with some species occurring in caves. Caucasoligidium, Tauroligidium and Typhloligidium are only known from caves in Crimea and the western Caucasus. Ligidioides is very poorly known, only being collected once from Atherton, Queensland.

== Taxonomy ==
This family contains 6 extant genera organised into 3 subfamilies.

Ligiinae Leach, 1814 sensu Borutzky, 1950

- Ligia Fabricius, 1798

Ligidioidinae Borutzky, 1950

- Ligidioides Wahrberg, 1922

Ligidiinae Borutzky, 1950

- Caucasoligidium Borutzky, 1950
- Ligidium Brandt, 1833
- Tauroligidium Borutzky, 1950
- Typhloligidium Verhoeff, 1918

A purported extinct genus in this family, Eoligiiscus Sánchez-García, Peñalver, Delclos & Engel, 2021, has been described from Albian-aged Àlava amber.

The monophyly of Ligiidae has been doubted due to the lack of strong apomorphies linking the family together and genetic evidence.
