= Venomics =

Study of venoms

Venomics is the study of proteins associated with venom, a toxic substance secreted by animals, which is typically injected either offensively or defensively into prey or aggressors, respectively.

== Background ==
Venom is produced in a specialised gland (or glands) and is delivered through hollow fangs or a stinger in a process called envenomation. The main function of venom is to disrupt the physiological processes of the wounded animal through neurotoxic, cytotoxic, myotoxic, or haemotoxic mechanisms. This can then help in certain processes such as procuring prey or in defense from predators. Venom has evolved many times in multiple phyla, each having developed their own unique types of venom and methods of delivery independently. However, due to the excessive amounts of venomous animals in the world, they are the major cause of animal-related deaths (~ 57,000 in 2013) than non-venomous animals (~22,000). For example, globally, someone is bitten by a snake every 10 seconds, according to estimates. Snakes are responsible for more than 5.4 million biting-injuries, resulting to 1.8 - 2.7 million envenomings and around 81,410 to 137,880 deaths annually. Bites by venomous snakes can cause acute medical emergencies involving severe paralysis that may prevent breathing, cause bleeding disorders that can lead to fatal haemorrhage, cause irreversible kidney failure and severe local tissue destruction that can cause permanent disability and limb amputation. Children may suffer more severe effects and can experience the effects more quickly than adults due to their smaller body mass. With venomic methods, venom can be co-opted into beneficial substances such as new medicines and effective insecticides. For instance, Captopril® (Enalapril), Integrilin® (Eptifibatide) and Aggrastat® (Tirofiban) are drugs based on snake venoms, which have been approved by the FDA. In addition to these approved drugs, many other snake venom components are now involved in preclinical or clinical trials for a variety of therapeutic applications.

== The Creation and History of Venomics Techniques ==
Venom is made up of multiple proteinous components, with each component differing in its structural complexity. Venom can be a mixture of simplistic peptides, secondary (α-helices and β-sheets) structured proteins and tertiary structured proteins (crystalline structures). Furthermore, depending on the organism, there can be fundamental differences in the strategies they incorporate in their venom contents, the biggest difference being between invertebrates and vertebrates. For example, the majority of funnel-web spider's venom was made up of peptides between 3-5 KDa (75%), with the remaining peptides being between 6.5 and 8.5 KDa in mass. Conversely, snake venom is made up of more complex protein such as modified saliva proteins (CRISPs & kallikrein) and protein families that have had their genes recruited from other tissue groups (Acetylcholinesterase, crotasin, defensin & cystatin). Due to this extraordinary amount of variation in the components that make up venom, a new field was needed to identify and categorise the millions of bioactive molecules that are found within the venom. Therefore, by combining the methods of multiple fields such as genomics, transcriptomics, proteomics and bioinformatics, an aptly named new field emerged named venomics.

Venomics was first established in the latter half of the 20th century as different ‘-omic’ technologies began to rise in popularity. However, the progression of venomics since its inception has always been reliant on and limited by the advancement of technology. Juan Calvete draws attention to this with explicitly when detailing the history of venomics. He declares that ''the last revolutions made in venomics research in the last decade (1989–1999) are the direct result of advancements made in proteomic-centered methods and the indirect result of more widely available and cost-effective forms of transcriptomics and bio-informatics analysis''. One of the first popular research topics of venomics was the pharmacological properties of the polypeptide toxins found in snake venom (Specifically, Elapidae and Hydrophidae) due to the neurotoxic properties and their ability to cause respiratory failure in animals. However, due to the lack of competent technology, less complex techniques (such dialysis to separate the venom), followed by simplistic chromatography and electrophoresis analysis, research was limited.

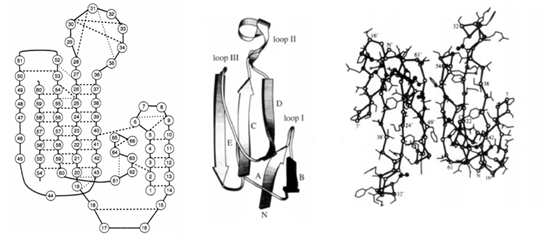
(Left) The amino acid structure, (Middle) diagram and (Right) Stereodiagram of k-Bungarotoxin.

Evidence of early interest in snake venom was prevalent throughout the early 20th century with one of the first big breakthroughs being in the mid-1960s. For example, Halbert Raudonat was one of the first researchers to fractionate Cobra (Naja nivea) venom using a sophisticated dialysis and paper chromatography techniques. Furthermore, Evert Karlsson and David Eaker were able to successfully purify the specific neurotoxins found in Cobra (Naja nigricollis) venom and found that those isolated polypeptides had a consistent molecular weight of around 7000.

Future research in this field would eventually lead to indirect predictive models and then direct crystal structures of important many protein superfamilies. For example, Barbara Low was one of the first to release a 3D structure of the three-finger protein (TFP), Erabutoxin-b. TFPs are an example of α-Neurotoxins, they are small in structure (~60-80 amino acid length) and are a predominant component found in many snake venoms (representing up to 70%-95% of all toxins).

== The Current State and Methodology of Venomics ==
Retrospectively, venomics has made a lot of progress in sequencing and creating accurate models of toxic molecules through current advanced methods. Through these methods, global categorisation of venoms has also taken place, with previously studied venoms being documented and widely available. An example of this would be the ‘Animal toxin annotation project’ (Provided by the UniProtKB/Swiss-Prot), which is a database that aims to provide a high quality and freely available source of protein sequences, 3D structures and functional information on thousands of animal venom/poisons. So far, they have categorised over 6,500 toxins (Both venoms & poisons) at the protein-level, with the overall UniProt organisation having reviewed over 500,000 proteins and provided the proteomes of 100,000 organisms. However, even with today's technology the deconstruction and cataloguing of the individual components of what makes up an animal's venom takes a large amount of time and resources due to the overwhelming amount of molecules that are found in a single venom sample. This is complicated further when there are some animals (I.e. Cone snails) that can change the complexity and make-up of their venom depending on the circumstances (Offensive related or defensive related matters) of the envenoming. Furthermore, inter-specific differences exist between male and female of a species with their venoms varying in quantities and toxicity.

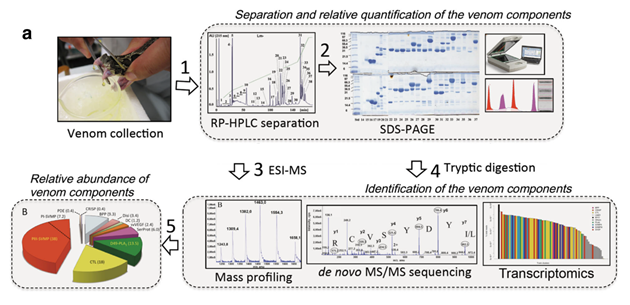
A typical workflow for the isolation and screening of compounds found in venom.

Professor Juan J. Calvete is a researcher in venomics at the biomedical institute in Valencia and has extensively explained the process involved in untangling and analysing venom (Once in 2007 and recently in 2017.)

These involve the following steps:

(1) Venom collection, (2) Separation and quantification, (3) Identification and (4) Representation of components found.

=== (1) Venom collection methods ===
Venom milking is the most simplistic way of collecting a venom sample. It usually involves a vertebrate animal (Typically a snake) to deliver a venomous bite into a container. Similarly, electrical stimulation can be used for invertebrate animal (Insects and arachnids) subjects. This practice has allowed for the discovery of the basic properties of venom and to understand the biological factors involved in venom production such as venom regeneration periods. Other methods involve post-mortem dissection of the venom glands to collect the required materials (Venom or tissue).

=== (2) Separation and quantification methods ===
Separation methods are the first step to decomplexify the venom sample, with a common method being reverse‐phase high performance liquid chromatography (RP-HPLC). This method can be applied broadly to nearly all venoms as a crude fractionation method and to detect the peptide bonds found. A less common techniques like 1D/2D gel electrophoresis can also be used in cases of venoms containing heavy, complex peptides (Preferable >10KDa). This means in additions to RP-HPLC, Gel electrophoresis can help identify large molecules (such as enzymes) and to help refine venom prior to further analytical methods. Next, N-terminal sequencing is used to find the amino acid order of the fractionated proteins/peptides starting with the N-terminal end. Furthermore, SDS‐PAGE (Sodium dodecyl sulfate-polyacrylamide gel electrophoresis) can be performed on the isolated proteins from the RP-HPLC to identify proteins of interest before moving on to the identification stage.

=== (3) Identification methods ===
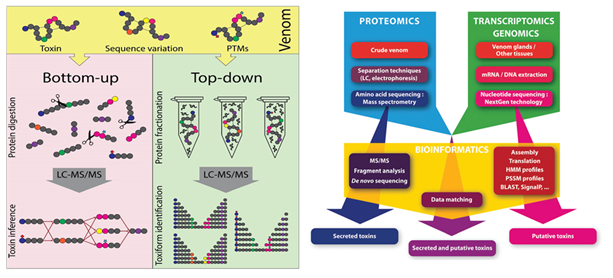
(Left) Representation of Bottom-up and Top-down proteomic analysis. (Right) Similarities and differences between the Proteomic and the Transcriptomics/Genomics analytical methods.

There are two predominantly used proteomic methods when identifying the structure of a peptide/protein, Top-down proteomics (TDP) and Bottom-up proteomics (BUP). TDP involves taking fractionated venom samples and analysing those peptides/proteins with Liquid chromatography tandem-mass spectrometry (LC-MS/MS). This results in the identification and characterisation of all peptides/proteins present in the initial sample. While BUP consists of fractionating and breaking down the peptides/proteins before analysis (LC-MS/MS) using chemical reduction, alkylating and enzymatic digestion (Typically with trypsin). BUP is more commonly used than TDP as breaking down the samples allows the components to meet the ideal mass range for LC-MS/MS analysis. However, there are disadvantages and limitations with both identification methods. BUP results are prone to protein inference problems as large toxins can be broken down into smaller toxins which are shown in the output, but do not exist naturally within the venom sample. While, TDP is the newer method and is able to fill-in the gaps BUP leaves, TDP needs instruments with high amounts of resolving power (Typically 50,000 or above). Most studies will actually use both methods in parallel to obtain the most accurate results. Furthermore, transcriptomic/genomic methods can be used to create cDNA libraries from the extracted mRNA molecules expressed in the venom glands of a venomous animal. These methods optimise the protein identification process by producing the DNA sequences of all proteins expressed in the venom glands. A large problem in using transcriptomic/genomic analysis in venomic studies is the lack of full genome sequences of many venomous animals. However, this is a fleeting problem due to the amount of full genome projects involved in sequencing venomous animals such as the ‘venomous system genome project’ (Launched in 2003). Through these projects, various fields of study such as ecological/evolutionary studies and venomic studies can provide supporting information and systematic analysis of toxins.

=== (4) Accurate representation of components ===
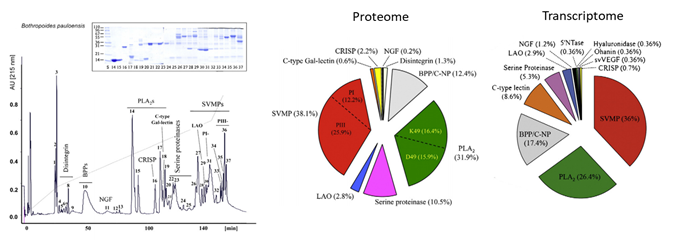
The finding of (Left) proteomic practices and (Right) transcriptomic practices when analysing the venomone of the Bothropoides pauloensis .

Renata Rodrigues produced an informative study detailing both the proteome and the transcriptome of the Neuwied's Lancehead (Bothropoides pauloensis), with all the methods described above. The proteome showed the presence of nine protein families with the majority of components belonging to snake venom metalloproteinases (38%), phospholipase A2 (31%) and Bradykinin-potentiating peptides/C-type natriuretic peptides (12%). The transcriptome gave a cDNA of over 1100 expressed sequence tags (ESTs), with only 688 sequences being related to the venom gland. Similarly, the transcriptome showed matching results with 36% of SVMP's being the majority of the ESTs followed by PLA2 (26%) and BPP/C-NP (17%) sequences. Furthermore, this study shows that through both the use of proteomic and transcriptomics, we can fully comprehend the components within venom. This can then lead to both the molecular structure and functions of many bioactive components, which can in turn lead to bioprospecting venom components into new medicines and can help to develop better methods of creating anti-venoms.

== The Future Possibilities of Venomics ==
The field of venomics has been vastly revamped since its origin in the 20th century and continues to be improved with contemporary methods such as next generation sequencing and nuclear magnetic resonance spectroscopy. From this trend, it would seem that venomics will be progressively enhanced in its capabilities through the persistent technological advancements of the 21st century. As previously mentioned, a potential route that can be expanded upon further by venomics could be venom-specific molecules being co-opted into specialised medicines. The first example of this was in the early 1970s, when Captopril was found to be an inhibitor of angiotensin converting enzymes (ACE) and had the means of treating hypertension in people. Glenn King discusses the current state of venom-derived drugs, with six drugs derived from venom being FDA-approved and ten more currently being under clinical trials. Michael Pennington gives a detailed update on the current landscape of venom-derived drugs and the potential future of the field (Table 1).

Anti-venoms is another branch of medicine, which needs to be improved due to the problems many developing countries face with venomous animals. Places like south/southeast Asia and sub-Saharan Africa are where many cases of both morbidity (limb amputation) and mortality take place. Snakes (especially Elapidae and Viperidae) are the leading cause of envenomings and antivenoms are in constant short supply in high risk areas due to the strenuous productive methods (Immunised animals) and the strict storage preferences (Constant below 0^{O}C storage). This problem continues, when the medicine itself has limited effects on localised tissue and inevitably causes either acute (anaphylactic or pyrogenic) and delayed (serum sickness type) reactions in most patients. However, by using different ‘omic’ technologies, the use of ‘Antivenomics’ can potentially make safer, more cost effective and less time-consuming ways of producing antivenoms for a range of toxic organisms. New antivenom methods are even being investigated today with the use of monoclonal antibodies (mAbs) and the expansion of venomous databases, allowing for more effective approaches when screening of cross-reactivity of antivenoms. Lastly, agriculture can be improved upon by enhanced-venomic techniques through the invention of insect-specific biopesticides created from venom. Insects are both an agricultural/horticultural pest and act as vector/carriers of many parasites and disease. Ergo, effective insecticides are always needed to control the destructive effects of many insect species. However, many insecticides used in the past, do not meet current regulations and have been banned due to harmful effects such as affecting non-target species (DDT) and having a high toxicity level towards mammals (Neonicotinoids). Monique Windley propose arachnid venom is a potential solution to this problem due to the abundance of neurotoxic compounds present in their venom (Predicted 10million bioactive peptides) and due to their venom being specific towards insect.

Table 1. Venom-derived medicines discussed by Pennington, Czerwinski et al., (2017).

	Treatment for	Mode of action/ Target site	Animal of origin	Development stage
Captopril	Hypertension/ Congestive heart failure	ACE inhibitor	Pit viper (Bothrops jararaca)	Approved
Eptifibatide	Antiplatelet drug	Circulatory system	Pygmy rattlesnake (Sistrurus miliarius barbouri)	Approved
Tirofiban	Antiplatelet drug	Circulatory system	Russell's viper (Daboia russelii)	Approved
Lepirudin	Anticoagulant	Thrombin inhibitor	Saw-scaled viper (Echis carinatus)	Approved
Bivalirudin	Anticoagulant	Thrombin inhibitor	Medicinal leech (Hirudo medicinalis)	Approved
Ziconotide	Chronic pain	Voltage-gated calcium channels	Cone snail (C. geographus)	Approved
Exenatide	Type 2 diabetes	GLP-1 receptor	Gila monster (Heloderma suspectum)	Approved
Chlorotoxin	Tumour imaging	Cl^{−} channels/ Glioma cells	Deathstalker scorpion (Leiurus quinquestriatus)	Clinical development
Stichodactyla (ShK)	Autoimmune disease(s)	Voltage-gated potassium channels	Caribbean sea anemone (Stoichactis helianthus)	Clinical development
SOR-C13	Cancer	TRPV6	N. short-tailed shrew (Blarina brevicauda)	Clinical development
HsTX1 [R14A]	Autoimmune disease(s)	Voltage-gated potassium channels	Giant Forest scorpion (Heterometrus spinnife)	Preclinical development
NaV1.7 blockers	Pain	Na_{V}1.7	Several tarantula species (Thrixopelma pruriens, Selenocosmia huwena, Pamphobeteus nigricolor)	Preclinical development
α-conotoxin RgIA	Pain	nACh receptors	Cone snail (Conus regius)	Preclinical development
α-Conotoxin Vc1.1	Pain	nAChRs	Cone snail (Conus victoriae)	Discontinued
χ-Conotoxin MrIA	Pain	Norepinephrine transporter inhibitor	Cone snail (Conus marmoreus)	Discontinued
Contulakin-G	Pain	Neurotensin receptors	Cone snail (Conus geographus)	Discontinued
Conantokin-G	Pain/Epilepsy	NMDA receptors	Cone snail (Conus geographus)	Discontinued
Cenderitide	Cardiovascular disease(s)	ANP receptor B	Modified Green mamba venom (Dendroaspis angusticeps)	Discontinued

== See also ==
- Toxinology
- Snake venom
- Antivenom
- Bioprospecting
- Venomous animals
