= HsTx1 =

Scorpion toxin

HsTx1 is a toxin from the venom of the scorpion Heterometrus spinifer. HsTx1 is a very potent inhibitor of the rat Kv1.3 voltage-gated potassium channel.

== Etymology ==
HsTx1 stands for Heterometrus spinifer Toxin 1. The systematic name for this toxin is α-KTx 6.3.

== Sources ==
HsTx1 is produced by Heterometrus spinifer, also known as Asia Giant Forest Scorpion or Malaysian Black Scorpion.

- Taxon Identifier: 118530

== Structure ==
HsTx1 is characterized by a single polypeptide chain of 34 amino acid residues containing 8 Cysteine residues and an amidated C-Terminal end. Its core has a hydrophobic structure and the backbone displays one α-helix and two β-sheets regions that connect the N-terminal and the C-terminal ends. The entire structure is cross-linked by 4 disulfide bridges. Scorpion toxins characterized that block voltage-gated potassium channels, have a highly conserved triplet of amino acids in the positions 23, 25 and 26 that is believed to have a role in the affinity for the channels. There are also two highly conserved amino acid residues (one positively charged and the other an aromatic residue) considered critical for the binding to specific α-subunits of the potassium channel depending on their position in the sequence. HsTx1 has the triplet in its sequence but does not show homology in the doublet sequence, hinting that it might be able to bind to different subunits in the channel.

=== Homology and categories ===
Scorpion venom usually contains different toxins that could influence the physiological functioning of nervous system binding the sites and blocking the activity of voltage-gated ion channels. The main targets of these toxins are potassium channels and sodium channels. On the basis of their amino acid sequences comparison those toxins are classified in 4 groups(3). HsTx1 Toxin belongs to the fourth group, which also contains toxins Pi1, Pi2 and Pi3 (from Pandinus imperator scorpion) and Maurotoxin (MTX, from Scorpio maurus scorpion). Main structural characteristics are the presence of 34 amino acid residues and 3 or 4 Disulfide bridges. Toxins of the fourth group have 50%-70% sequence identity overlap with each other. In general the sequence of HsTx1 has only the 32-47% affinity with that of the toxins belonging to the three disulfide bridges group. Despite that their 3D backbone structures are similar. Within the 4 bridge groups, there is more structural homology between Pi1 and MTX than with HsTx1, since HsTx1 does not share the same position of cysteine residues responsible for the sulfide bonds in its sequence. These differences in homology could explain the differences in pharmacological activity such as HsTx1 binding with more affinity and specificity to the Kv1.3.

== Target and mode of action ==
HsTx1 is one of the most effective peptidic inhibitors of Kv1.3 channels with an IC50 of 12 pM. Unlike other toxins from the same family HsTx1 does not seem to affect the apamin-sensitive calcium-dependent potassium channel. The affinity and interaction with the potassium channel is thought to depend both on the amino acid sequence of the toxin and the modification of its C-terminal end. It has been found that the amidated form might have a role in the higher affinity for the potassium channel. Positively charged residues of the toxin interact with negatively charged residues in the channel by electrostatic and Van der Waals forces. The toxin induces a reversible blocking effect by the formation of two salt bridges and six hydrogen bonds in the mouth of the pore of the channel. The five critical residues thought to interact with the channel are Y26, K29, M31, N32, R39.

== Research ==
Because peptide toxins usually have high affinity for their targets, the small dosage needed to see effects makes them good candidates for therapies that aim to specifically and efficiently block voltage-gated ion channels. The aim now is to overcome the affinity range that usually involves more than one type of channel so that the effects can be specifically targeted and there are no side-effects. Kv1.3 channels are up-regulated in activated T effector memory cells in humans. Study of Kv1.3 blockers such as HsTx1 could lead to new treatments to autoimmune disorders such as multiple sclerosis, rheumatoid arthritis and type 1 diabetes.
