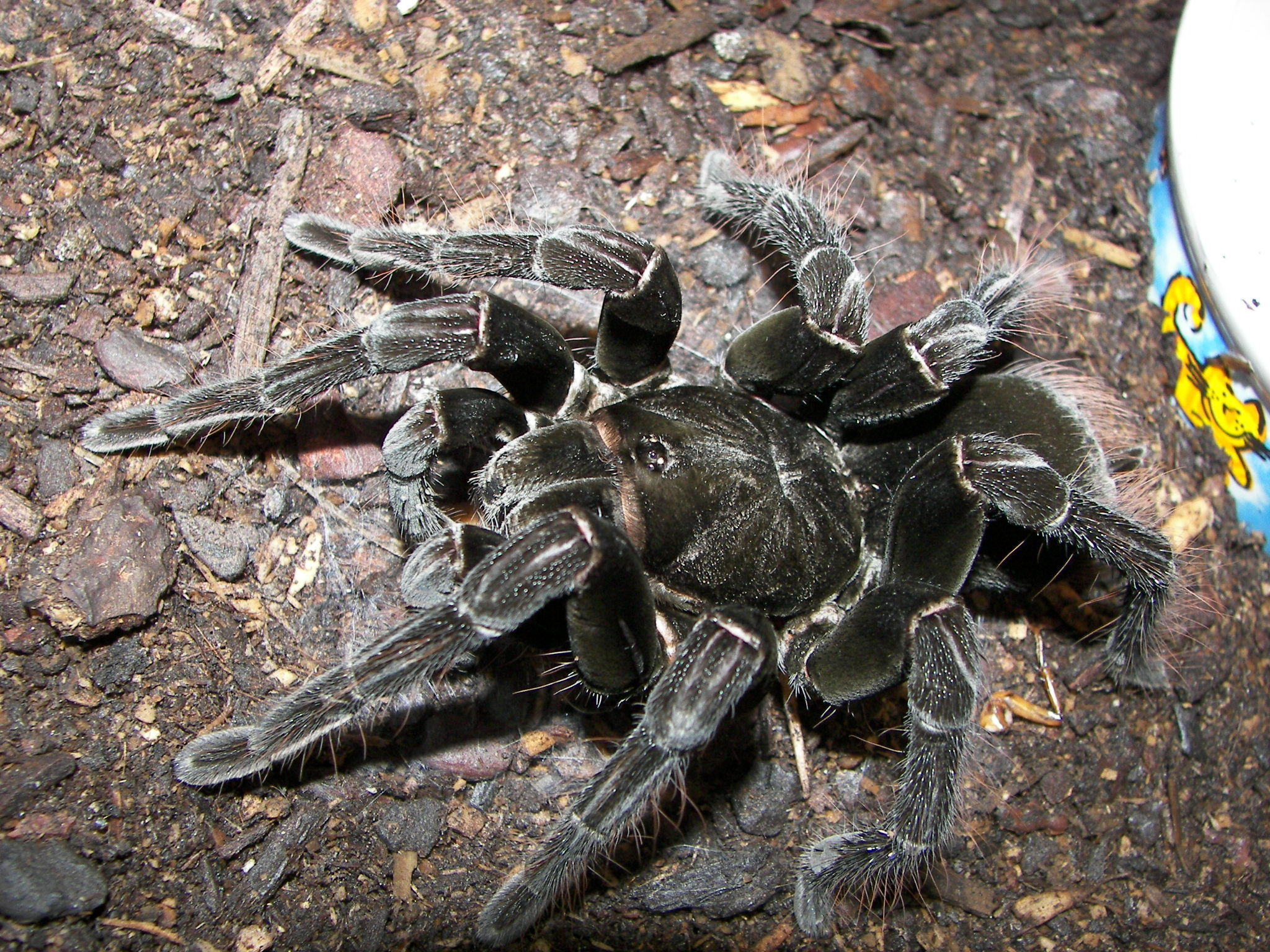
- Pamphobeteus antinous

Scientific classification
- Kingdom: Animalia
- Phylum: Arthropoda
- Subphylum: Chelicerata
- Class: Arachnida
- Order: Araneae
- Infraorder: Mygalomorphae
- Family: Theraphosidae
- Genus: Pamphobeteus; Pocock, 1901

Type species
- P. nigricolor (Ausserer, 1875)

Species
- 18, see text

= Pamphobeteus =

Genus of spiders

Pamphobeteus is a genus of tarantulas that was first described by Reginald Innes Pocock in 1901. It includes some of the largest spiders in the world. They are found in South America, including the countries of Peru, Bolivia, Ecuador, Brazil, Colombia and Panama.

== Description ==
The males of the Pamphobeteus genus have a spoon shaped or thin embolus in the palpal bulb with elongate retrolateral superior and apical keels. They also possess a tibial apophysis with two branches on the first pair of legs, the metatarsus of which closes between the two branches. Females can be distinguished from most genera (except Xenesthis and Longilyra) by the large fused base of the spermathecae and short receptacles, and differs from those two genera by the presence of only ventral metatarsal scopulae on leg IV, and absence of lyriform stridulatory setae respectively.

== Species ==
As of February 2023 it contains eighteen species, endemic to northwestern South America and Panama:

- Pamphobeteus antinous Pocock, 1903 – Peru, Bolivia
- Pamphobeteus augusti (Simon, 1889) – Ecuador
- Pamphobeteus crassifemur Bertani, Fukushima & Silva, 2008 – Brazil
- Pamphobeteus ferox (Ausserer, 1875) – Colombia
- Pamphobeteus fortis (Ausserer, 1875) – Colombia
- Pamphobeteus grandis Bertani, Fukushima & Silva, 2008 – Brazil
- Pamphobeteus insignis Pocock, 1903 – Colombia
- Pamphobeteus lapola Sherwood, Gabriel, Brescovit & Lucas, 2022 – Colombia
- Pamphobeteus nellieblyae Sherwood, Gabriel, Brescovit & Lucas, 2022 – Ecuador
- Pamphobeteus nigricolor (Ausserer, 1875) (type) – Colombia and Brazil
- Pamphobeteus ornatus Pocock, 1903 – Panama and Colombia
- Pamphobeteus petersi Schmidt, 2002 – Ecuador and Peru
- Pamphobeteus sucreorum Gabriel & Sherwood, 2022 - Panama
- Pamphobeteus ultramarinus Schmidt, 1995 – Ecuador
- Pamphobeteus urvinae Sherwood, Gabriel, Brescovit & Lucas, 2022 – Ecuador
- Pamphobeteus verdolaga Cifuentes, Perafán & Estrada-Gomez, 2016 – Colombia
- Pamphobeteus vespertinus (Simon, 1889) – Ecuador
- Pamphobeteus zaruma Sherwood, Gabriel, Brescovit & Lucas, 2022 – Ecuador

Formerly included:

- Pamphobeteus anomalus Mello-Leitão, 1923 → Proshapalopus amazonicus
- Pamphobeteus benedeni (Bertkau, 1880) → Lasiodora benedeni
- Pamphobeteus cephalopheus Piza, 1944 → Vitalius vellutinus
- Pamphobeteus communis Piza, 1939 → Vitalius dubius
- Pamphobeteus holophaeus Mello-Leitão, 1923 → Eupalaestrus spinosissimus
- Pamphobeteus insularis Mello-Leitão, 1923→ Vitalius wacketi
- Pamphobeteus litoralis Piza, 1976→ Vitalius wacketi
- Pamphobeteus masculus Piza, 1939 → Vitalius wacketi
- Pamphobeteus melanocephalus Mello-Leitão, 1923 → Vitalius sorocabae
- Pamphobeteus mus Piza, 1944 → Vitalius dubius
- Pamphobeteus piracicabensis Piza, 1933 → Vitalius dubius
- Pamphobeteus platyomma Mello-Leitão, 1923 → Vitalius platyomma (Nomen dubium)
- Pamphobeteus rondoniensis Mello-Leitão, 1923 → Vitalius rondoniensis (Nomen dubium)
- Pamphobeteus roseus Mello-Leitão, 1923 → Vitalius roseus
- Pamphobeteus sorocabae Mello-Leitão, 1923 → Vitalius sorocabae
- Pamphobeteus striatus Schmidt & Antonelli, 1996 → Lasiodorides striatus
- Pamphobeteus tetracanthus Mello-Leitão, 1923 → Vitalius tetracanthus (Nomen dubium)
- Pamphobeteus urbanicolus Soares, 1941 → Vitalius dubius
- Pamphobeteus ypiranguensis Soares, 1941 → Vitalius dubius
