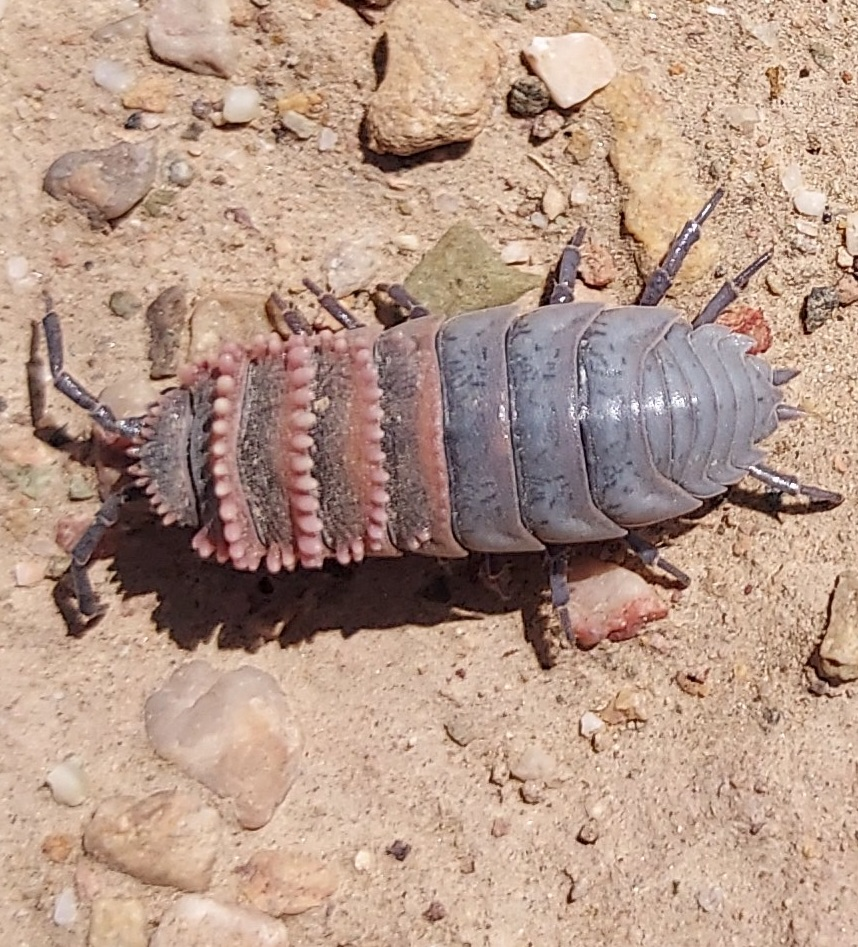

Scientific classification
- Kingdom: Animalia
- Phylum: Arthropoda
- Class: Malacostraca
- Order: Isopoda
- Suborder: Oniscidea
- Family: Agnaridae
- Genus: Hemilepistus
- Species: H. schirasi

Binomial name
- Hemilepistus schirasi Lincoln, 1970

= Hemilepistus schirasi =

Species of woodlouse

Hemilepistus schirasi is a species of woodlouse that lives in and around the deserts of central and southern Iran. It can be distinguished from other species of Hemilepistus in Iran by the pattern of tubercles on the head. H. schirasi has six large tubercles in a semicircle, and rows of three tubercles extending to the outside corners of the head; other species have more tubercles, in different arrangements.

It burrows in flat regions with a round tumulus, creating them with a circular entrance and cylindrical shape. The burrows are 8-11 mm in diameter, with a mean length of 80 cm and a mean depth of 62.5 cm. The burrows themselves are dug at a slope of around 80-85%. The tumulus structure for their burrows are regular blocks, around 1.5 x 3.5 mm.
