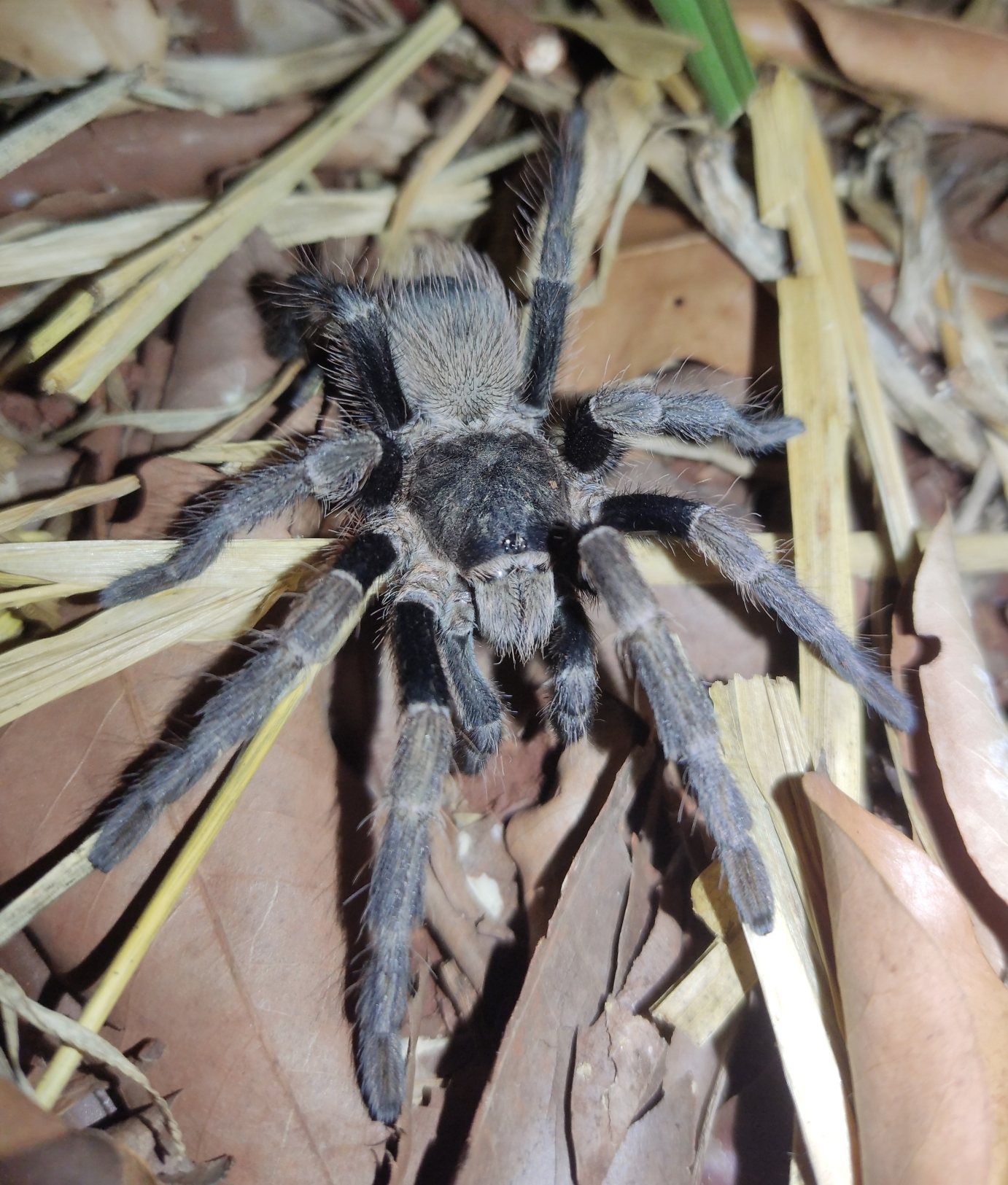
- V. paranaensis in Paraná, Brazil
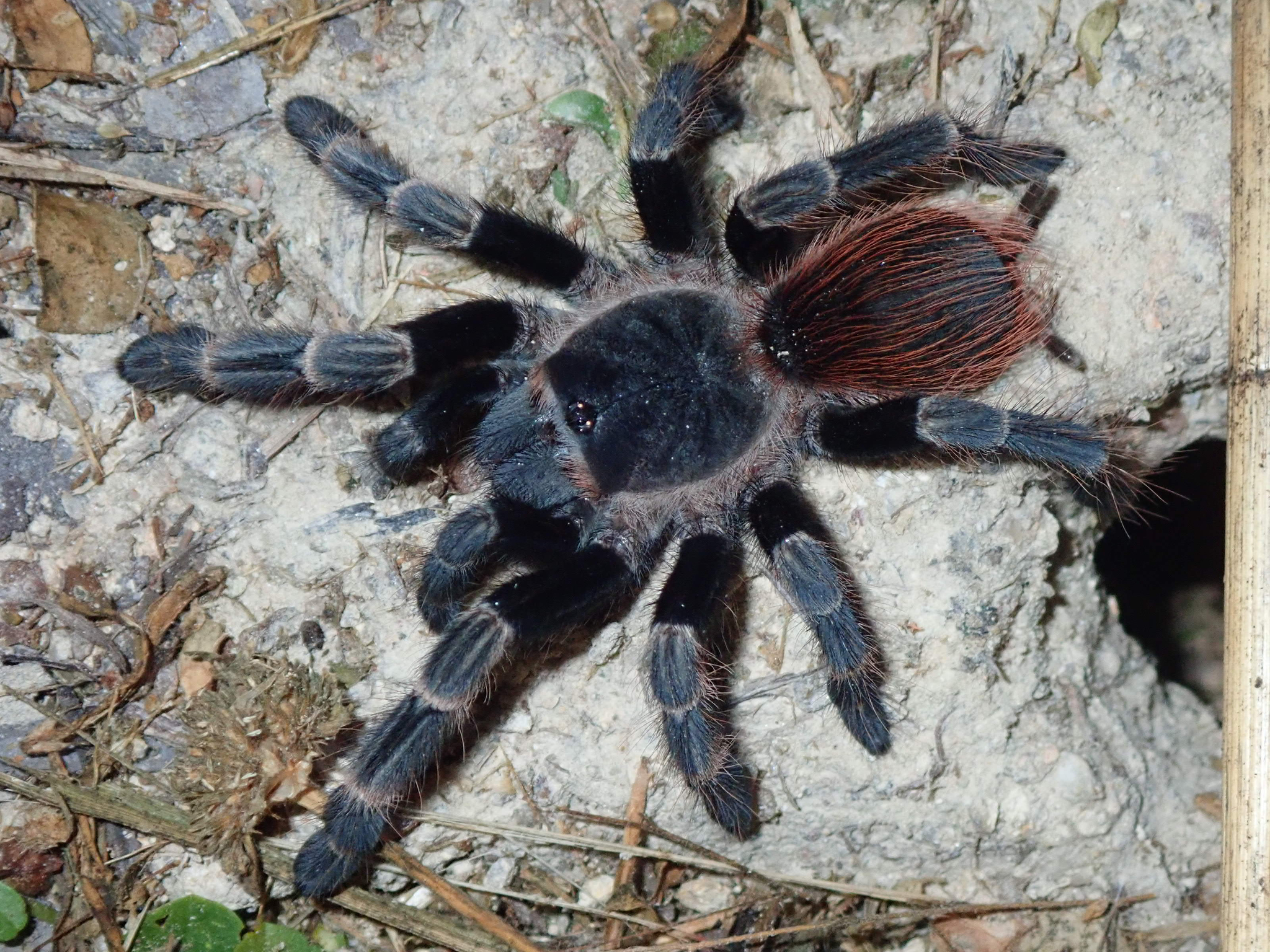
- V. ornatissimus in Tocantins, Brazil

Scientific classification
- Kingdom: Animalia
- Phylum: Arthropoda
- Subphylum: Chelicerata
- Class: Arachnida
- Order: Araneae
- Infraorder: Mygalomorphae
- Family: Theraphosidae
- Genus: Vitalius; Lucas, Silva & Bertani, 1993

Type species
- V. sorocabae (Mello-Leitão, 1923)

Species
- 11, see text

= Vitalius =

Genus of spiders

Vitalius is a genus of South American tarantulas that was first described by S. Lucas, P. I. da Silva Jr. & Rogério Bertani in 1993.

== Distribution ==
The described species are mainly endemic to Brazil, with V. paranaensis reaching into Argentina.

== Diagnosis ==
They can be distinguished from other tarantulas by the lack of stridulating hairs on the prolateral side of coxa 1 and in the palpal bulb. By the absence of scopula on the side of femur 1, and metatarsus 1 closing between the male spur branches.

== Taxonomy ==
V. wacketi was elevated to monotypic genus Tekoapora in 2023.

== Species ==
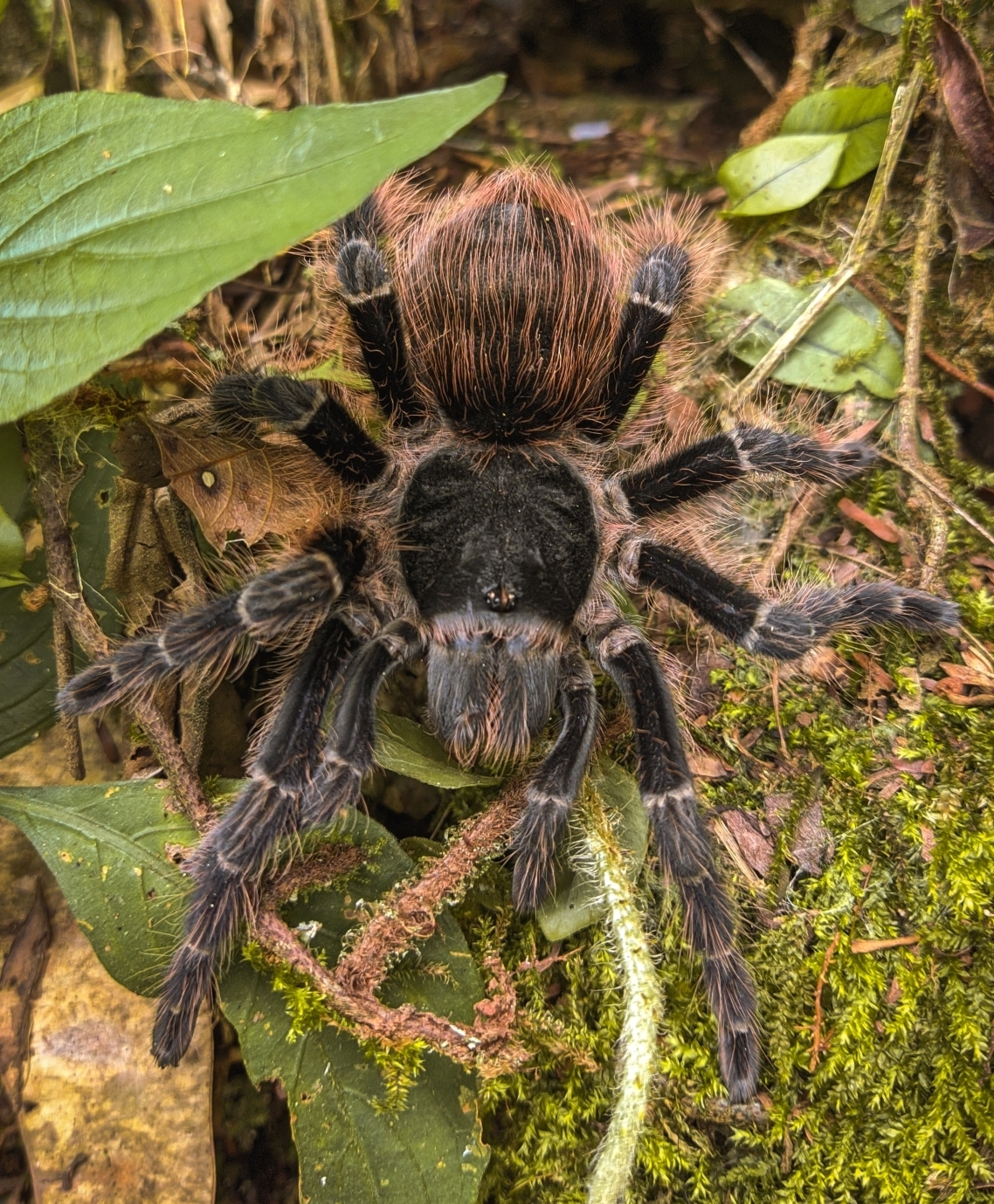
female V. buecherli

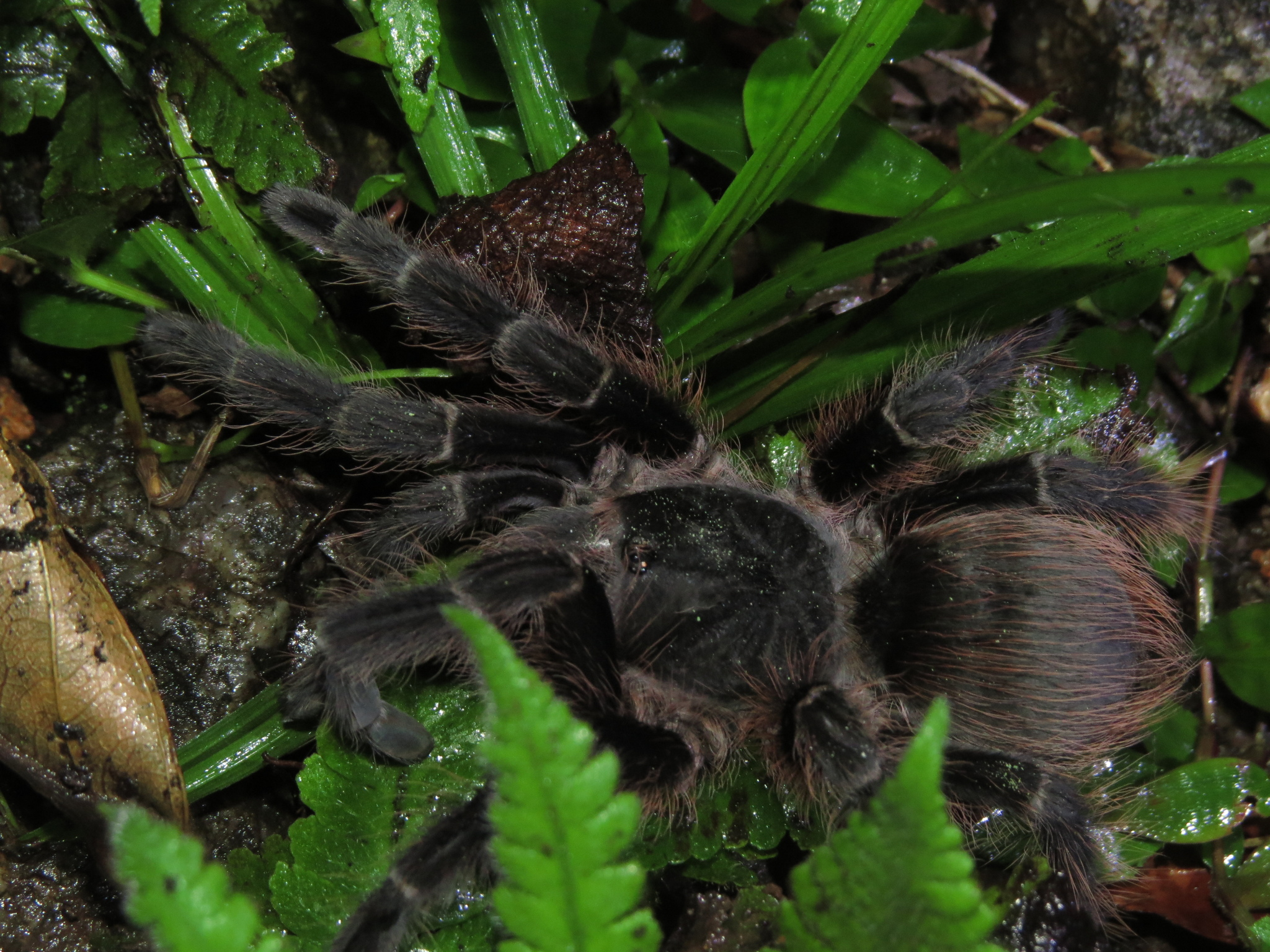
V. lucasae

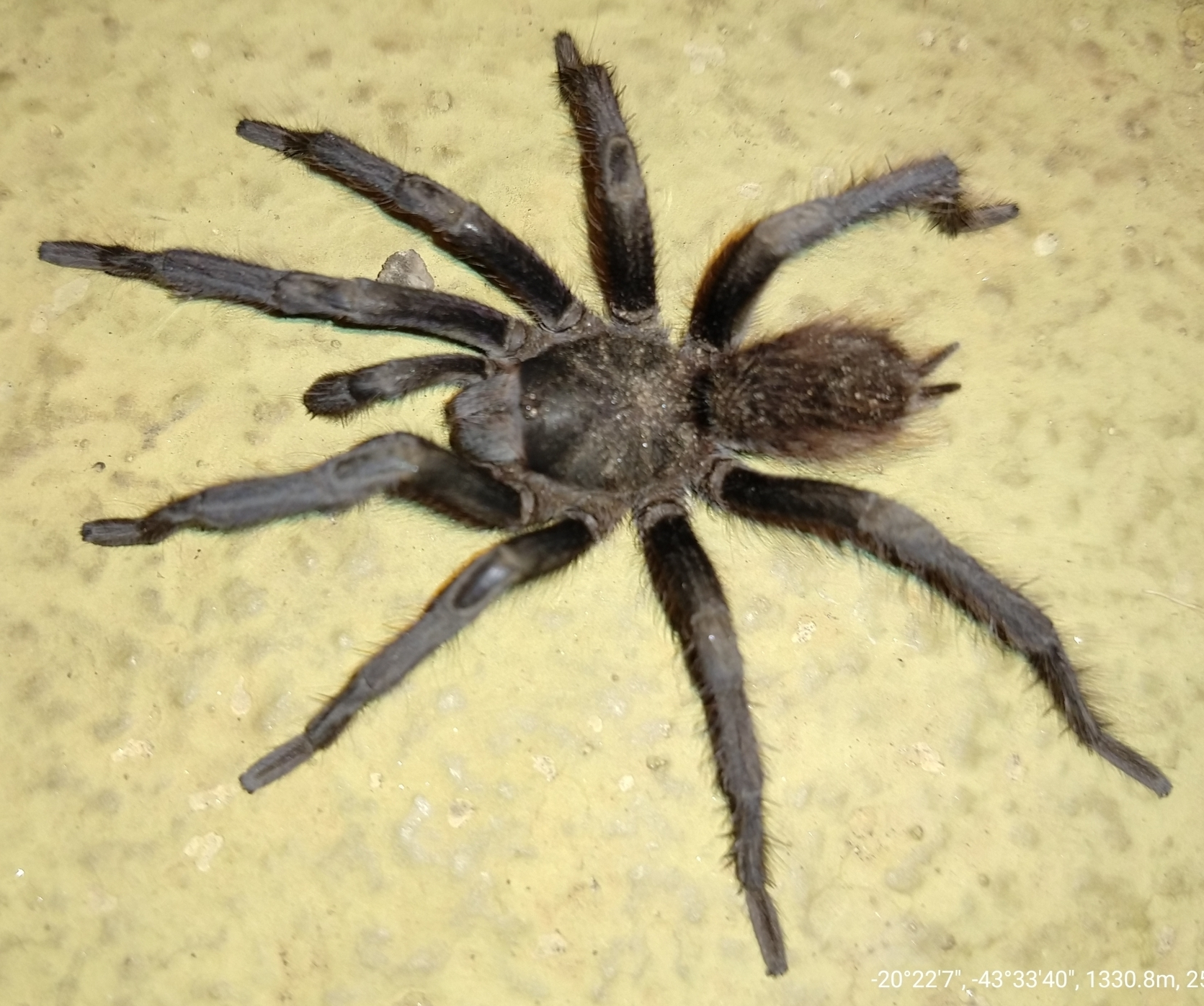
male V. nondescriptus

As of October 2025, this genus includes eleven species:

- Vitalius australis Galleti-Lima, Hamilton, Borges & Guadanucci, 2023 – Brazil
- Vitalius buecherli Bertani, 2001 – Brazil
- Vitalius dubius (Mello-Leitão, 1923) – Brazil
- Vitalius lucasae Bertani, 2001 – Brazil
- Vitalius ornatissimus Bertani & Motta, 2024 – Brazil
- Vitalius paranaensis Bertani, 2001 – Brazil, Argentina
- Vitalius restinga Bertani, 2023 – Brazil
- Vitalius sapiranga Bertani, 2023 – Brazil
- Vitalius sorocabae (Mello-Leitão, 1923) – Brazil (type species)
- Vitalius vellutinus (Mello-Leitão, 1923) – Brazil

=== In Synonymy ===
- V. cephalopheus (Piza, 1944) = Vitalius vellutinus (Mello-Leitão, 1923)
- V. cesteri (Mello-Leitão, 1923) = Vitalius dubius (Mello-Leitão, 1923)
- V. communis (Piza, 1939) = Vitalius dubius (Mello-Leitão, 1923)
- V. cucullatus (Mello-Leitão, 1923) = Vitalius dubius (Mello-Leitão, 1923)
- V. exsul (Mello-Leitão, 1923) = Vitalius dubius (Mello-Leitão, 1923)
- V. melanocephalus (Mello-Leitão, 1923) = Vitalius sorocabae (Mello-Leitão, 1923)
- V. melloleitaoi = Vitalius nondescriptus (Mello-Leitão, 1926)
- V. mus (Piza, 1944) = Vitalius dubius (Mello-Leitão, 1923)
- V. piracicabensis (Piza, 1933) = Vitalius dubius (Mello-Leitão, 1923)
- V. sylviae (Sherwood, Gabriel & Brescovit, 2023) = Vitalius sorocabae (Mello-Leitão, 1923)
- V. urbanicola (Soares, 1941) = Vitalius dubius (Mello-Leitão, 1923)
- V. ypiranguensis (Soares, 1941) = Vitalius dubius (Mello-Leitão, 1923)

=== Nomina dubia ===
- V. platyomma (Mello-Leitão, 1923) - Brazil
- V. rondoniensis (Mello-Leitão, 1923) - Brazil
- V. tetracanthus (Mello-Leitão, 1923) - Brazil
