= Mu-theraphotoxin-Pn3a =

Spider venom sodium-channel inhibitor

Three-dimensional NMR solution structure of μ-theraphotoxin-Pn3a, a 35-amino-acid peptide derived from the venom of Pamphobeteus nigricolor. Visualized using RCSB PDB Mol* (PDB: 5T4R).

Mu-Theraphotoxin-Pn3a (µ-TRTX-Pn3a) is a 35-amino-acid peptide toxin isolated from the venom of the South American tarantula Pamphobeteus nigricolor. Pn3a functions as a gating-modifier toxin, changing the activation characteristics of voltage-gated ion channels by binding to their voltage-sensing domains. It operates as an isoform-selective inhibitor of the low-voltage-activated T-type calcium channel Ca_{V}3.3 and is very effective against the tetrodotoxin-sensitive sodium channel Na_{V}1.7.

== Etymology ==
The accepted systematic naming convention for spider venom peptides is followed in the nomenclature of µ-theraphotoxin-Pn3a. The major ion channel target class is indicated by the prefix µ, and the peptide is classified as a theraphotoxin produced from Theraphosidae spiders by the suffix -TRTX-. The binomial name Pamphobeteus nigricolor is associated with the species code Pn, and the numerical suffix 3a identifies it as a particular peptide isoform that was obtained from that organism.

Additionally, the identifier Pn3a can also refer to a different toxin isoform isolated from the venom gland cDNA library of the armed spider Phoneutria nigriventer, where the designation combines the genus abbreviation ''Pn'' with the specific numerical isoform suffix ''3A''. This distinction is essential to prevent confusion between the tarantula-derived sodium channel modulator and the components identified in Phoneutria nigriventer venom research.

== Production ==
Pn3a is naturally produced in the venom glands of the South American tarantula Pamphobeteus nigricolor. It was first extracted by fractionating crude venom using high-performance liquid chromatography (HPLC) and mass spectrometry. For research applications, Pn3a is produced via solid-phase peptide synthesis utilizing Fmoc (9-fluorenylmethoxycarbonyl) chemistry, followed by targeted oxidative folding in glutathione redox buffers to establish its native disulfide architecture.

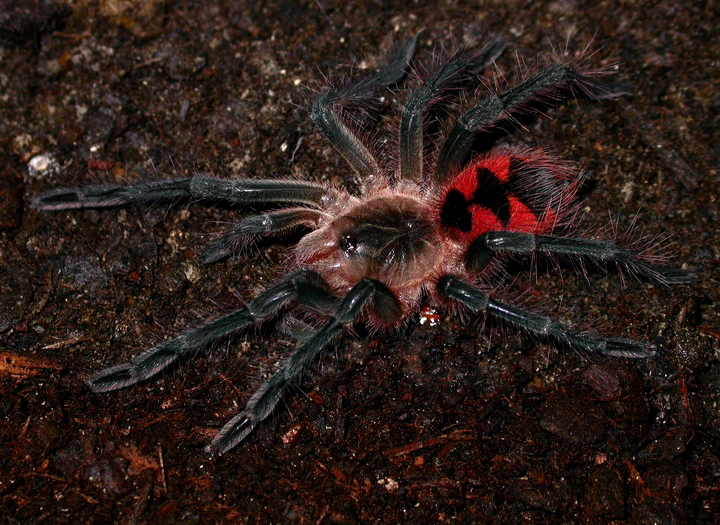
Pamphobeteus nigricolor, the South American tarantula species from which μ-theraphotoxin-Pn3a was isolated.

== Chemistry ==
Mu-theraphotoxin-Pn3a is a linear peptide composed of 35 amino acids with the primary sequence DCRYMFGDCEKDEDCCKHLGCKRKMKYCAWDFTFT. Its tertiary structure contains a conserved inhibitor cystine knot motif. Pn3a features an amphipathic surface architecture with a central hydrophobic region surrounded by charged residues, aiding in the initial integration into the membrane bilayer before the activation of the voltage sensor.

Additionally, recent structural and biophysical studies show that Pn3a's equilibrium and conformational stability are extremely sensitive to the pH of the surrounding environment. Important intramolecular salt bridges, such as those involving Asp12, Asp14, and Glu13, are disrupted by the protonation of important acidic residues in acidic environments (pH < 5), forcing the peptide into an inactive, disordered shape.

On the other hand, Pn3a assumes its rigid, completely organized inhibitory cystine knot (ICK) fold at physiological pH, signifying its stable and active state.

Furthermore, interactions with the local surface electrostatics of the channel's Domain II (DII) S3–S4 extracellular loop are modulated by Pn3a's electrostatic characteristics and net positive charge distribution, which fine-tunes voltage sensor activation and gating-modification potency.

== Target ==
Pn3a primarily inhibits the voltage-gated sodium channel Na_{V}1.7, which contributes to electrical signaling in sensory neurons. Electrophysiological recordings revealed an IC_{50} of 0.9 nM for human Na_{V}1.7, with around 40-fold selectivity over Na_{V}1.1 and at least 100-fold selectivity over the other tested sodium-channel subtypes. However, a different study reported a substantially higher IC_{50} of 1,457 ± 169 nM under different experimental conditions. The researchers suggested that differences in peptide folding might contribute to this discrepancy, although its exact cause remains unclear.

Subsequent studies also identified voltage-gated calcium channels as targets of Pn3a at higher concentrations. Pn3a inhibits the T-type calcium channel Ca_{V}3.3 with an IC_{50} of 0.96 µM and shows more than 100-fold selectivity over Ca_{V}3.1 and Ca_{V}3.2. Pn3a also inhibits several high-voltage-activated calcium channels, including Ca_{V}1.2, Ca_{V}1.3, Ca_{V}2.1, and Ca_{V}2.2, at micromolar concentrations. Ca_{V}2.2 showed an IC_{50} of approximately 3.7 µM, whereas Ca_{V}2.3 was not significantly affected at concentrations up to 10 µM.

== Mode of action ==
Pn3a acts as a gating-modifier toxin rather than directly obstructing the ion-conducting pore. In Na_{V}1.7, it interacts with voltage-sensing regions of the channel and shifts its voltage dependence of activation toward more positive membrane potentials. At a concentration of 100 nM, Pn3a shifted the half-activation voltage by approximately +21.3 mV, making channel opening less likely during small depolarizations and reducing sodium current. Experiments using modified channels indicate interactions with the S3-S4 linkers of domains II and IV. Pn3a also slows recovery from fast inactivation.

Electrostatic properties of Pn3a also influence its effects on Na_{V}1.7 activation. Increasing the toxin's net positive charge enhanced the depolarizing shift in channel activation from approximately +26 mV to +36 mV at 1 µM, without significantly changing its inhibitory potency. These findings indicate that electrostatic interactions between the toxin and the extracellular voltage-sensing regions contribute to its gating-modifying effects.

Pn3a affects voltage-gated calcium channels through different mechanisms. At Ca_{V}2.2, Pn3a inhibits the channel by shifting its steady-state inactivation toward more negative membrane potentials by approximately 18 mV. This increases channel inactivation and reduces the number of channels available for opening, without a comparable shift in activation. In contrast, Pn3a inhibits the low-voltage-activated calcium channel Ca_{V}3.3 by shifting its activation toward more depolarized potentials by approx. +13 mV. Experiments using modified channels identified the voltage-sensing region of Domain II as an important interaction site. These findings demonstrate that Pn3a modifies the gating properties of sodium and calcium channels through distinct mechanisms.

== Toxicity ==
The toxicity of purified Pn3a has been investigated in preclinical rodent experiments. Systemic administration of Pn3a at doses up to 3 mg/kg reduced pain behaviors induced by experimental activation of Na_{V}1.7, without significant motor coordination impairment at the tested doses. However, the effects depended on the route and dose of administration. Intrathecal administration of 0.3 nmol Pn3a did not significantly impair motor performance in rats, whereas a higher intrathecal dose of 1 nmol produced motor impairment. These findings demonstrate that Pn3a can affect motor function at higher doses administered directly into the spinal compartment.

== Therapeutic use ==
Pn3a is investigated as a pharmacological tool for studying the role of Na_{V}1.7 in pain signaling. In mice, Pn3a reduced pain-related behaviors caused by experimental activation of Na_{V}1.7. In rodent models of inflammatory pain, Pn3a generally did not produce substantial analgesic effects when administered alone. Combined treatment with low doses of the opioid oxycodone produced stronger analgesic effects in several models.

Local and systemic administration of Pn3a reduced mechanical hypersensitivity in a mouse model of acute postsurgical pain. The analgesic effect was reversed by the opioid receptor antagonist naloxone, indicating the involvement of endogenous opioid signaling. Enhanced analgesic effects were also observed when Pn3a was combined with oxycodone or the GABA_{B} receptor agonist baclofen. Additionally, Pn3a inhibited high-voltage-activated calcium currents in sensory neurons, with further inhibition observed following activation of Mu-opioid receptors.
