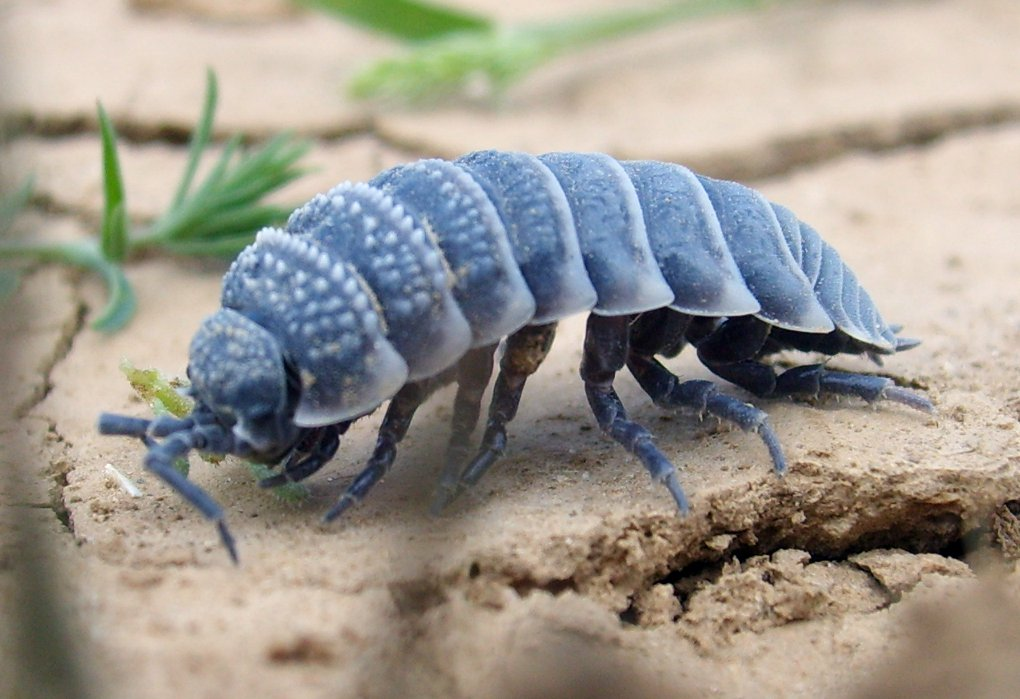

Scientific classification
- Kingdom: Animalia
- Phylum: Arthropoda
- Class: Malacostraca
- Order: Isopoda
- Suborder: Oniscidea
- Family: Agnaridae
- Genus: Hemilepistus
- Species: H. reaumuri

Binomial name
- Hemilepistus reaumuri (H. Milne-Edwards, 1840) (Note: The authority is often cited as "(Audouin, 1826)" or "(Audouin & Savigny, 1826)". See the section on taxonomic history for an explanation.)

Synonyms
- Hemilepistus bodenheimeri; Hemilepistus palaestinus; Paraniambia tuberculata; Porcellio reaumuri

= Hemilepistus reaumuri =

Species of woodlouse

Hemilepistus reaumuri is a species of woodlouse or isopod that lives in and around the deserts of North Africa and the Middle East, "the driest habitat conquered by any species of crustacean". It reaches a length of 22 mm (0.87 in) and a width of up to 12 mm (0.47 in), and has seven pairs of legs which hold its body unusually high off the ground. The species was described in the Description de l'Égypte after the French Campaign in Egypt and Syria of 1798–1801, but was first formally named by Henri Milne-Edwards in 1840 as Porcellio reaumuri. It reached its current scientific name in 1930 after the former subgenus Hemilepistus was raised to the rank of genus.

Hemilepistus reaumuri occurs at great population densities and fills an important niche in the desert ecosystem. It feeds on plant leaves, obtains most of its water from moisture in the air and sand, and is in turn an important prey item for the scorpion Scorpio maurus. H. reaumuri is only able to survive in such arid conditions because it has developed parental care of its offspring. Adults dig burrows which are inhabited by family groups, which are recognised using pheromones. The burrows are 40–50 cm (16–20 in) deep, and the woodlice retreat to the relatively cool and moist conditions of the burrow when surface conditions are unfavourable. The territorial limit of each colony is marked with a faecal embankment.

== Description ==
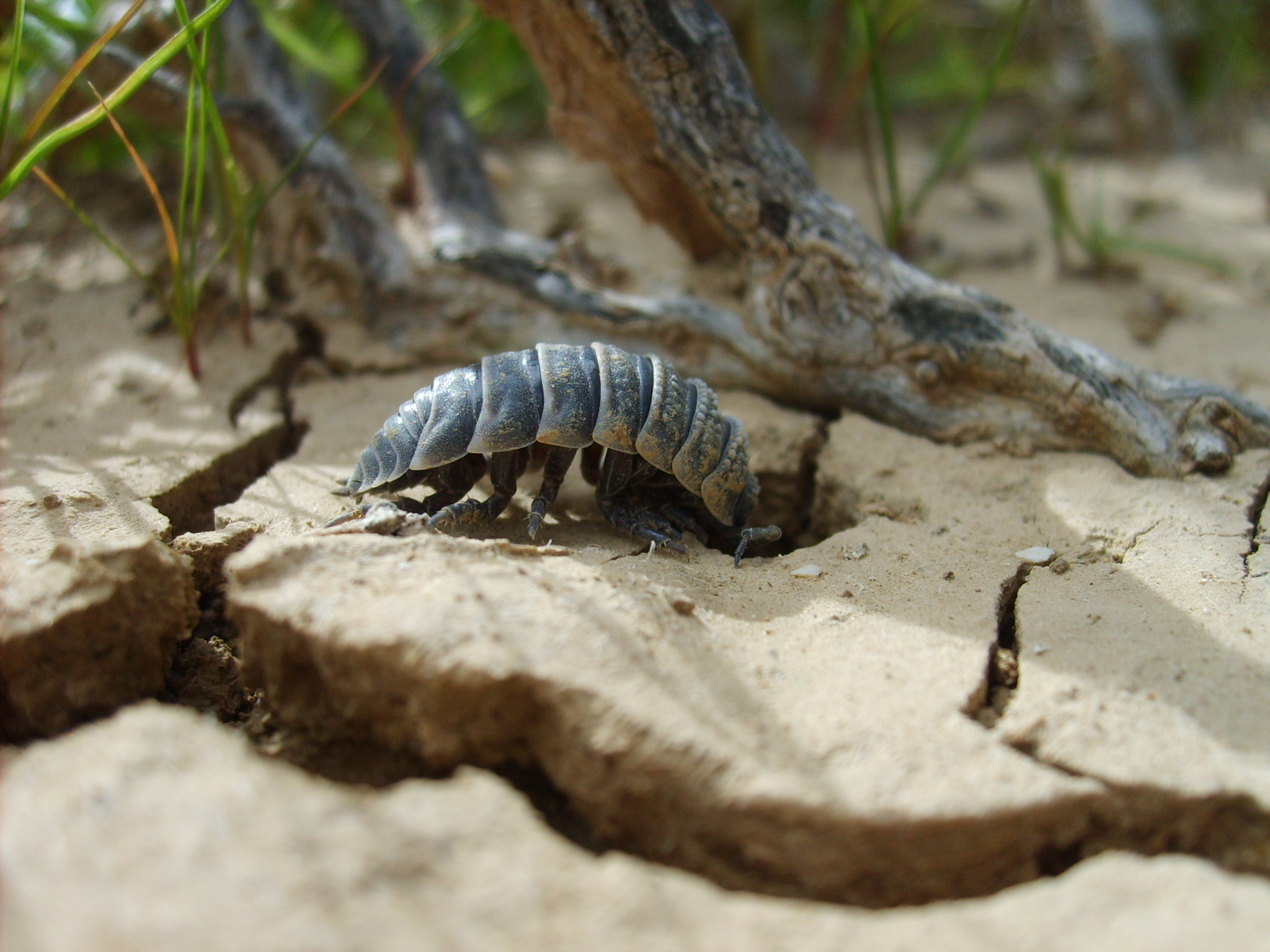
H. reaumuri at a burrow entrance

Hemilepistus reaumuri is approximately 22 mm (0.87 in) long, and 9–12 mm (0.35–0.47 in) wide. In common with other woodlice, it has seven pairs of legs and a pair of conspicuous antennae. It is classified in the family Trachelipodidae; within that family, it is placed in the genus Hemilepistus because of the presence of tubercles only on the head and the nearby parts of the thorax.

Hemilepistus reaumuri differs from other desert woodlice in a number of respects. It is crepuscular, while other species are nocturnal. Apart from at the highest temperatures, it is also positively phototactic (is attracted to sunlight), while other species are negatively phototactic (move away from bright light). Compared to other woodlice, H. reaumuri walks in an unusual manner, with its body held high off the ground.

== Distribution ==
Hemilepistus reaumuri is found in the steppes, semideserts and deserts of North Africa, and the Middle East, and occasionally on the margins of salt lakes. This has been described as "the driest habitat conquered by any species of crustacean". H. reaumuri is most closely associated with loess soils in the Sahara Desert and Negev Desert, although its range extends from eastern Algeria to western Syria.

== Ecology ==
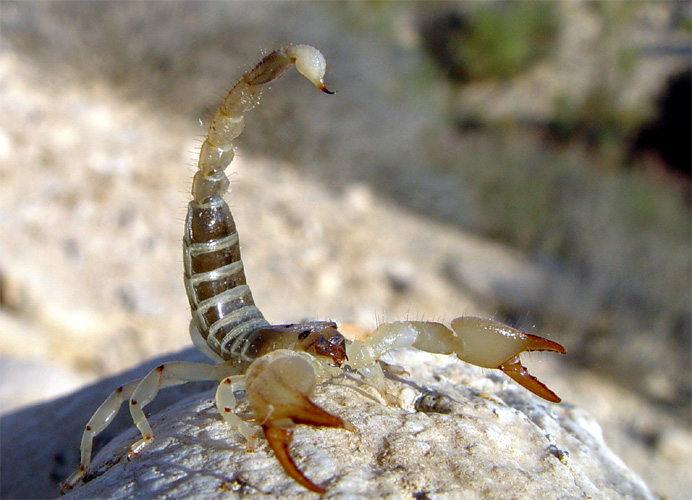
Scorpio maurus is a major predator of Hemilepistus reaumuri.

Hemilepistus reaumuri is an important part of the desert ecosystem. It has been found at population densities of up to 480,000 individuals per hectare, which is equivalent to a biomass of 19.2 kg/ha; in comparison, desert mammals are estimated to have a combined biomass of 39.9 kg/ha. The main predator of H. reaumuri is the scorpion Scorpio maurus, and it may compose up to 70% of the scorpion's diet. It appears to be vulnerable to attack only on the surface; no predators are known to attack H. reaumuri in its burrows.

Hemilepistus reaumuri can only escape the heat of the desert by constructing a burrow, which is time-consuming and energetically costly. One parent must therefore guard the burrow while the other forages for food. H. reaumuri can spend up to ten months of the year returning to the surface to forage, which is far longer than species which do not dig burrows, such as Armadillidium vulgare or Armadillo officinalis. Although they will forage at temperatures as high as 35 °C (95 °F), these woodlice retreat to their burrow when the temperature is too high. They are also unable to tolerate air with a relative humidity below 6%, which often occurs at depths of up to 30 centimetres (12 in) in the desert soil in the hottest months, and the burrows are therefore dug at least 40–50 cm (16–20 in) deep. The burrows are vertical, with a single entrance 9–12 mm (0.35–0.47 in) in diameter, and there may be up to 20 burrows per square metre (nearly 2 per square foot) in favourable areas. If a foraging woodlouse cannot find the burrow entrance on its return, it employs a complex and efficient strategy to find it again. It begins with a spirally widening search, and develops into a more meandering approach the longer it is unable to find the burrow.

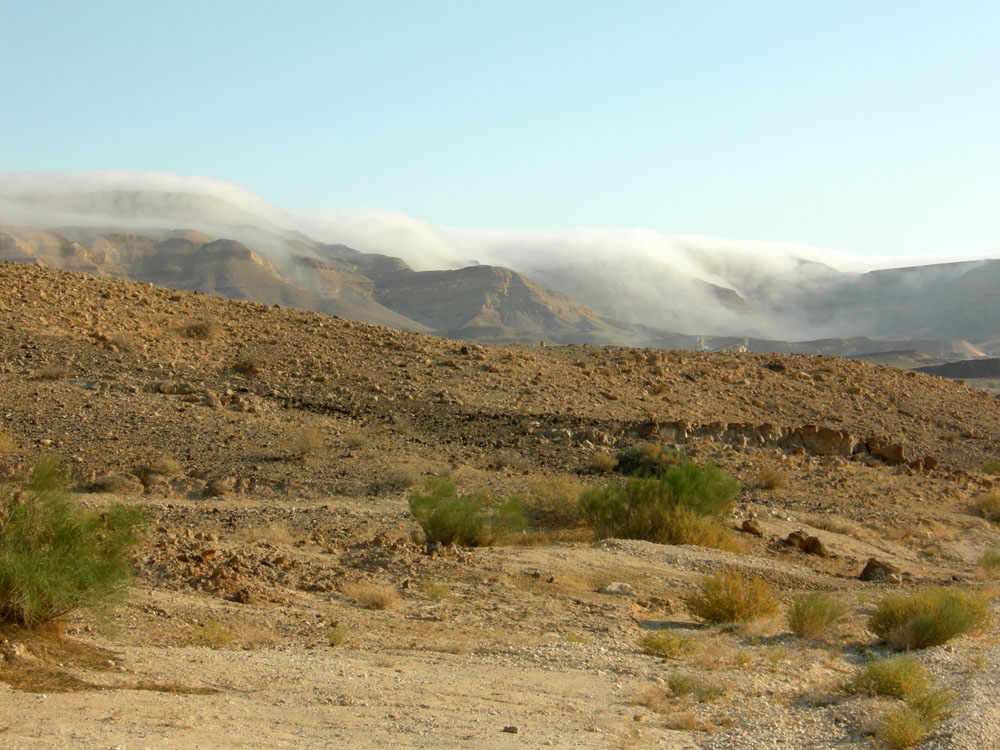
Mist rolls over the edge of HaMakhtesh HaGadol in the Negev Desert: water vapour is an important source of water for Hemilepistus reaumuri.

Hemilepistus reaumuri has a significantly higher biomass than other herbivores in the Negev Desert, making it an important part of herbivore–omnivore food chains. They spend the day provisioning their burrows with leaf material from the surface of the desert, sometimes resting under stones or in crevices of rocks. Their faeces accumulates on the surface, and forms a "faecal embankment", similar to a levee, which demarcates the extent of the home territory of the colony in the burrow. The plants Artemisia herba-alba and Haloxylon scoparium are the most abundant bushes in the Negev desert, and seem to make up most of the diet of H. reaumuri.

The bulk of the water intake of Hemilepistus reaumuri is by taking up water vapour from saturated air and by eating damp sand. Water loss is minimised by the rectal epithelium, which absorbs water, ensuring that the faeces is drier than the food the animal consumed. Evaporation of water through the permeable exoskeleton may, however, provide a valuable cooling effect.

== Life cycle ==
Hemilepistus reaumuri is the only species of Hemilepistus to have developed parental care of its offspring, and it is only because of this development that the species can survive in the desert. It is monogamous, and, unusually, both parents tend the young.

The colonies are quiescent during the winter, and young individuals emerge in February and March to establish new burrows. Sheltered sites below bushes are chosen, although larger males will often try to pair with a female who has already established a burrow, sometimes ousting her male partner. The anatomy of H. reaumuri is not specialised for digging, and the excavation is a slow process, taking place only in early spring. The first 3–5 cm (1.2–2.0 in) are dug by a single woodlouse, which then stops to guard the new burrow. Eventually, it will allow one other woodlouse of the opposite sex to enter, and they then engage in a ritual which often lasts for hours, before copulating.

The female bears 50–100 live young, typically in May. The young remain in the burrow for 10–20 days, being provided with food by their parents. On leaving the burrow, they are wary of other families, and adults may catch other adults' offspring and feed them to their own, but do not normally attack their own children. Members of each social group recognise each other using pheromones. Each pair only produces one brood, and the life of an individual of H. reaumuri is typically around 15 months long, considerably shorter than the 2–4 year lifespans of woodlice from more mesic habitats, such as Armadillidium vulgare, Porcellio scaber or Philoscia muscorum.

== Taxonomic history ==
Hemilepistus reaumuri was illustrated in volume 21 of the Description de l'Égypte, researched during Napoleon's campaign in Egypt and Syria of 1798–1801, and dedicated to René Antoine Ferchault de Réaumur. The section on Crustacea was begun by Marie Jules César Savigny but finished by Jean Victoire Audouin after Savigny's health deteriorated. The species was not given a formal scientific name, however, until Henri Milne-Edwards did so in 1840, calling it Porcellio reaumuri. Although initially placed in the genus Porcellio, it was later moved by G. H. A. Budde-Lund in 1879 to his new subgenus Hemilepistus, which was raised from a subgenus of Porcellio to the rank of genus by Karl Wilhelm Verhoeff in 1930. Several species names that were previously thought to be synonyms of H. reaumuri have been re-examined, and found to refer to a species in a different family, now known as Porcellio brevicaudatus.
