= Spinoxin =

Spinoxin (SPX; α-KTx6.13) is a 34-residue peptide neurotoxin isolated from the venom of the Malaysian black scorpion Heterometrus spinifer. It is part of the α-KTx6 subfamily and exerts its effects by inhibiting voltage-gated potassium channels, specifically Kv1.2 and Kv1.3.

== Sources ==
Spinoxin is isolated from the venom of the Malaysian black scorpion H. spinifer, from which the toxin gets its name. Researchers first characterized it in 2003.

== Chemistry ==
=== Structure ===
Spinoxin is a peptide neurotoxin consisting of 34 amino acid residues. It has a molecular weight of 3.7 kDa. All members of the α-KTx subfamily share a common cysteine-stabilized α/β motif (CSαβ). In spinoxin the N-terminal contains the α-helix whereas the C-terminal contains the β-region/sheet, which is involved in the binding to the potassium-channel, resulting in blocking of the channel. Four disulfide bridges connect these terminals stabilizing the small protein. The pattern of spinoxin disulfide bonding has been determined to be Cys3-Cys24, Cys9-Cys29, Cys13-Cys31, and Cys19-Cys34. A 3D model of spinoxin can be viewed on this website.

The amino acid sequence of spinoxin
I R C S G S R D C Y S P C M K Q T G C P N A K C I N K S C K C Y G C-NH2

=== Family ===
Spinoxin belongs to the class of small proteins with knottin folds resulting from the four disulfide bonds. The superfamily spinoxin is part of is known as "scorpion toxin-like", and its family as "short-chain scorpion toxins".

=== Homology ===
Spinoxin has 82% sequence homology with maurotoxin (MTX; α-KTx6.2). Most short-chain scorpion toxins contain three disulfide bridges, whereas several toxins belonging to the α-KTx6 subfamily, including spinoxin and maurotoxin, possess a fourth disulfide bridge.

== Target ==
Similar to maurotoxin, spinoxin is a member of the extensively studied α-KTx family of neurotoxins acting on voltage-gated potassium channels. However, little is known about spinoxin in particular. Spinoxin targets voltage-gated potassium channels Kv1.2 and Kv1.3, possibly by blocking the selectivity filter with its Lys residues. It has no inhibitory effects on Kv1.1 channels.

== Mode of Action ==
It has been reported that the following three amino acid residues in particular are important for blocking of potassium channels: Lys^{23}, Asn^{26}, and Lys^{30}. Furthermore, three out of the four disulfide bridges affect the intensity of the inhibition, specifically Cys3-Cys24, Cys9-Cys29, Cys13-Cys31. The Cys19-Cys34 bond does not seem to be required for Kv1.3 inhibition.

== Toxicity ==
Spinoxin can cause intense pain, visual disturbances and swelling of the affected area. However, it is not lethal to humans.
