= Hemilepistus rhinoceros =

Scientific classification
- Kingdom: Animalia
- Phylum: Arthropoda
- Class: Malacostraca
- Order: Isopoda
- Suborder: Oniscidea
- Family: Agnaridae
- Genus: Hemilepistus
- Species: H. rhinoceros

Binomial name
- Hemilepistus rhinoceros Borutzkii, 1958

Species of woodlouse

Hemilepistus rhinoceros is a species of crustacean first discovered by Borutzkii in 1958. No subspecies are listed at Catalogue of Life.
