= Pamphobeteus vespertinus =

Scientific classification
- Kingdom: Animalia
- Phylum: Arthropoda
- Subphylum: Chelicerata
- Class: Arachnida
- Order: Araneae
- Infraorder: Mygalomorphae
- Family: Theraphosidae
- Genus: Pamphobeteus
- Species: P. vespertinus

Binomial name
- Pamphobeteus vespertinus (Simon, 1889)

Species of tarantula

Pamphobeteus vespertinus also known as the Ecuadorian red bloom tarantula is a tarantula first described in 1889 in Eugène Simon. They are found in the arid areas of Ecuador, and they are terrestrial tarantulas.

== Description ==
Females live a bit over 15 years, while males only live to 4. Their body is mainly black, their opisthosoma being covered in reddish hairs, and the carapace having some red stripping. The legs are also black, under certain lighting conditions looking somewhat pink or purple.

== Habitat ==
They are found in the arid areas of Ecuador, including the Sangay National Park, where I will be referring to in this section. The temperatures of this area range from 6 to 24 °C with average yearly rainfall ranging from 500mm to 4000mm. The altitude of this area also owns a broad range, from 1000m, to 5000m above sea level. It is a natural refuge for many animals and plants, being home 3000 plant species, and around 500 species of vertebrates.

== Behavior ==
This tarantula is terrestrial, and are highly irritable species. They are shy, thought they are also quite aggressive compared to other New World tarantulas. They are slow tarantulas, which would rather run than to fight, but if pressured they will throw urticating hairs towards the attacker.
