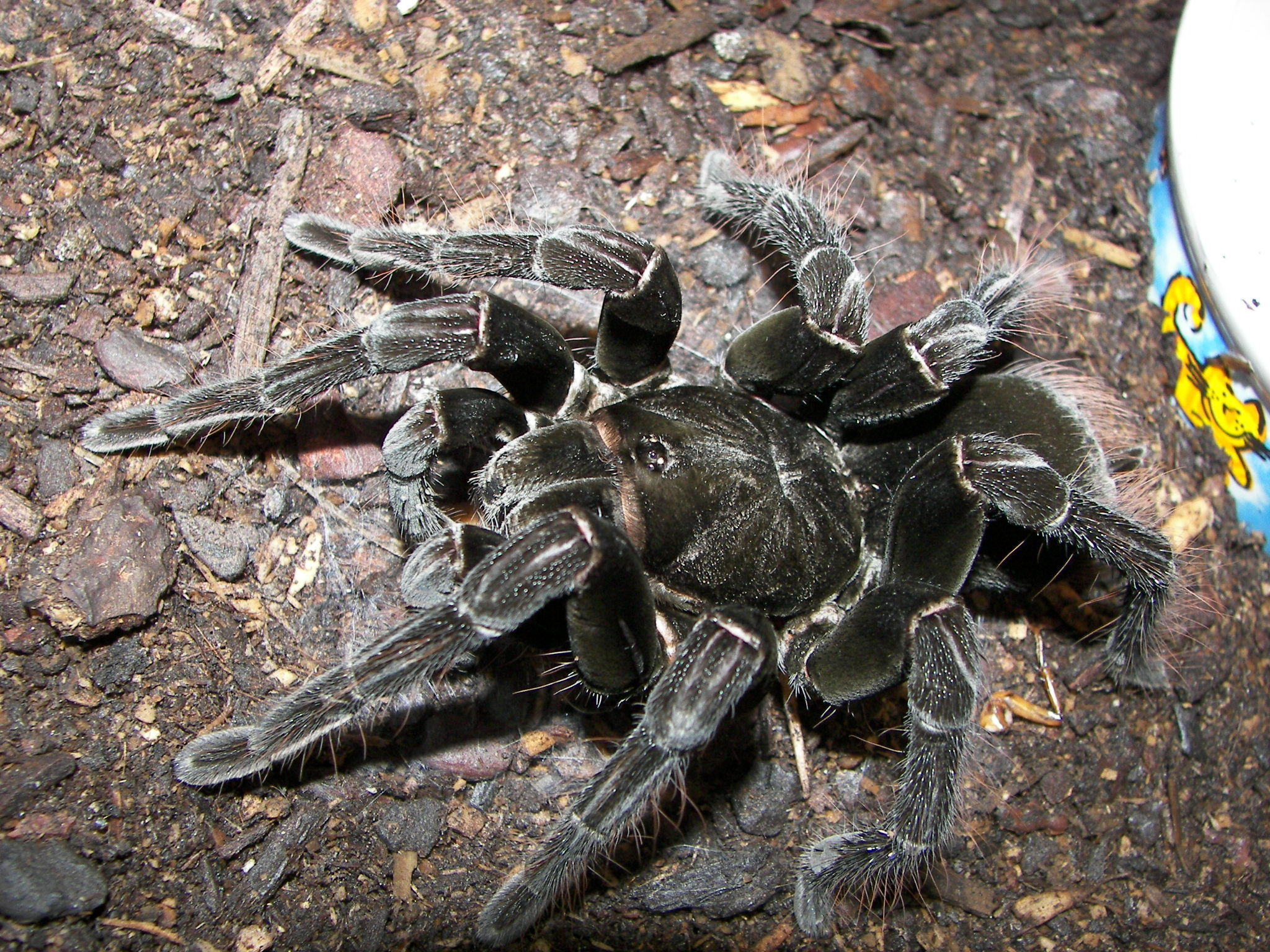

Scientific classification
- Kingdom: Animalia
- Phylum: Arthropoda
- Subphylum: Chelicerata
- Class: Arachnida
- Order: Araneae
- Infraorder: Mygalomorphae
- Family: Theraphosidae
- Genus: Pamphobeteus
- Species: P. antinous

Binomial name
- Pamphobeteus antinous Pocock, 1903

= Pamphobeteus antinous =

Species of spider

Pamphobeteus antinous, also known as the Bolivian blue leg bird eater or steely blue leg, was first described by Reginald Innes Pocock in 1903. It is found in the rainforests of Bolivia and Peru, and is considered to be one of the bigger tarantulas.

== Description ==
Females live up to 15 years, while males only live to 4. Sexual dimorphism is present in this species in two forms, females being heavier and by the coloration. Males own a very dark blue almost black carapace and a black opisthosoma covered in black hairs, with some reddish hairs near the end. Their legs are a bright metallic blue, covered in grayish hairs. Their female counterparts are entirely black.

== Coloration ==
A striking feature of mature males is the vivid blue-violet iridescence of the bristles (setae) covering the three inner segments of the legs — the coxa, trochanter and femur — as well as the pedipalps and chelicerae. Females lack this coloration entirely and are uniformly black, making this one of the more pronounced examples of sexual dimorphism in coloration among tarantulas.

The blue-violet colour has a structural rather than pigmentary origin. Research by Simonis, Bay, Welch, Colomer and Vigneron established that each coloured bristle contains a coaxial multilayer structure — a series of concentric cylindrical sheets of differing refractive index — which functions as a cylindrical Bragg mirror, selectively reflecting wavelengths around 430 nm (blue-violet) through constructive interference of light. The reflected wavelength shifts with viewing angle, producing the characteristic iridescent effect. Because the iridescent coloration is confined to mature males and absent in females and juveniles, the authors proposed that it may play a role in sexual signalling.

== Habitat ==
They are found in the rainforests of Bolivia and Peru, where average yearly rainfall is less than 2000mm and average temperatures of 26°C. It is home to plants such as Mistol, Bolivian Begonia and the Amazon Sword Plant. It is also home to animals such as the Jaguar, the Giant Otter and Sloths.

== Behavior ==
This tarantula will try to flee at first, maybe throwing a few urticating hairs while doing such. If this continues the tarantula will probably try to accurately aim those hairs at the intruder.
