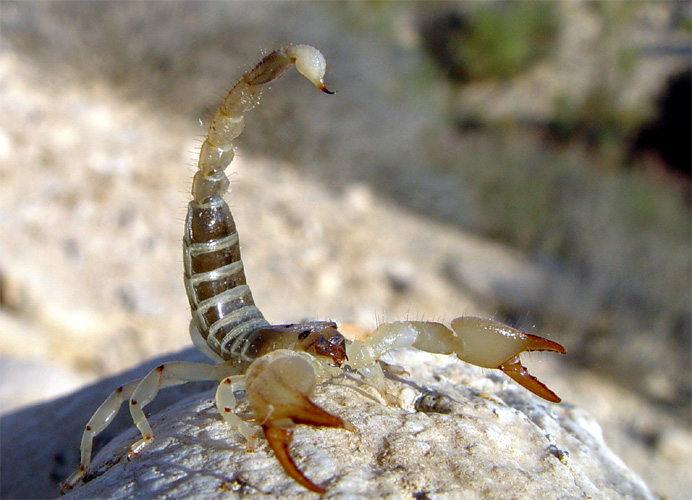
- Scorpio palmatus

Scientific classification
- Kingdom: Animalia
- Phylum: Arthropoda
- Subphylum: Chelicerata
- Class: Arachnida
- Order: Scorpiones
- Family: Scorpionidae
- Genus: Scorpio; Linnaeus, 1758

Type species
- Scorpio maurus Linnaeus, 1758

= Scorpio (genus) =

Genus of scorpions

Scorpio is a genus of scorpions belonging to the family Scorpionidae. The species in this genus are found in northern Africa and western Asia.

== Species ==
Scorpio was regarded as a monotypic genus for a long time, containing one widespread and highly variable species, S. maurus, which had many subspecies. It has since been recognised that within S. maurus sensu lato there were a number of taxa which should be regarded as valid species and new species have been described from sub-Saharan Africa:

The genus Scorpio includes:

- Scorpio atakor Ythier, Sadine, Bengaid & Lourenço, 2024
- Scorpio atlasensis Khammassi, Harris & Sadine, 2023
- Scorpio birulai Fet, 1997
- Scorpio ennedi Lourenço, Duhem & Cloudsley-Thompson, 2012
- Scorpio fuliginosus (Pallary, 1928)
- Scorpio fuscus (Ehrenberg, 1829)
- Scorpio hesperus Birula, 1910
- Scorpio iznassen Ythier & Francois, 2023
- Scorpio jordanensis Afifeh, Yagmur, Al-Saraireh & Amr, 2024
- Scorpio karakurti Yagmur, 2024
- Scorpio kruglovi Birula, 1910
- Scorpio maurus Linnaeus, 1758

- Scorpio maurus arabicus (Pocock, 1900)
- Scorpio maurus behringsi Schenkel, 1949 [Nomen dubium]
- Scorpio maurus maurus Linnaeus, 1758
- Scorpio maurus stemmleri Schenkel, 1949 [Nomen dubium]
- Scorpio maurus towsendi (Pocock, 1900)

- Scorpio mogadorensis Birula, 1910
- Scorpio moulouya Ythier & Francois, 2023
- Scorpio niger Lourenço & Cloudsley-Thompson, 2012
- Scorpio occidentalis Werner, 1936
- Scorpio palmatus (Ehrenberg, 1828)
- Scorpio propinquus (Simon, 1872) [Nomen dubium]
- Scorpio punicus Fet, 2000
- Scorpio savanicola Lourenço, 2009
- Scorpio sirnakensis Yagmur, 2024
- Scorpio sudanensis Lourenço & Cloudsley-Thompson, 2009
- Scorpio tassili Lourenço & Rossi, 2016
- Scorpio touili Ythier & Francois, 2023
- Scorpio trarasensis Bouisset & Larrouy, 1962
- Scorpio wahbehi Afifeh, Yagmur, Al-Saraireh & Amr, 2024
- Scorpio weidholzi Werner, 1929
- Scorpio yemenensis Werner, 1936
