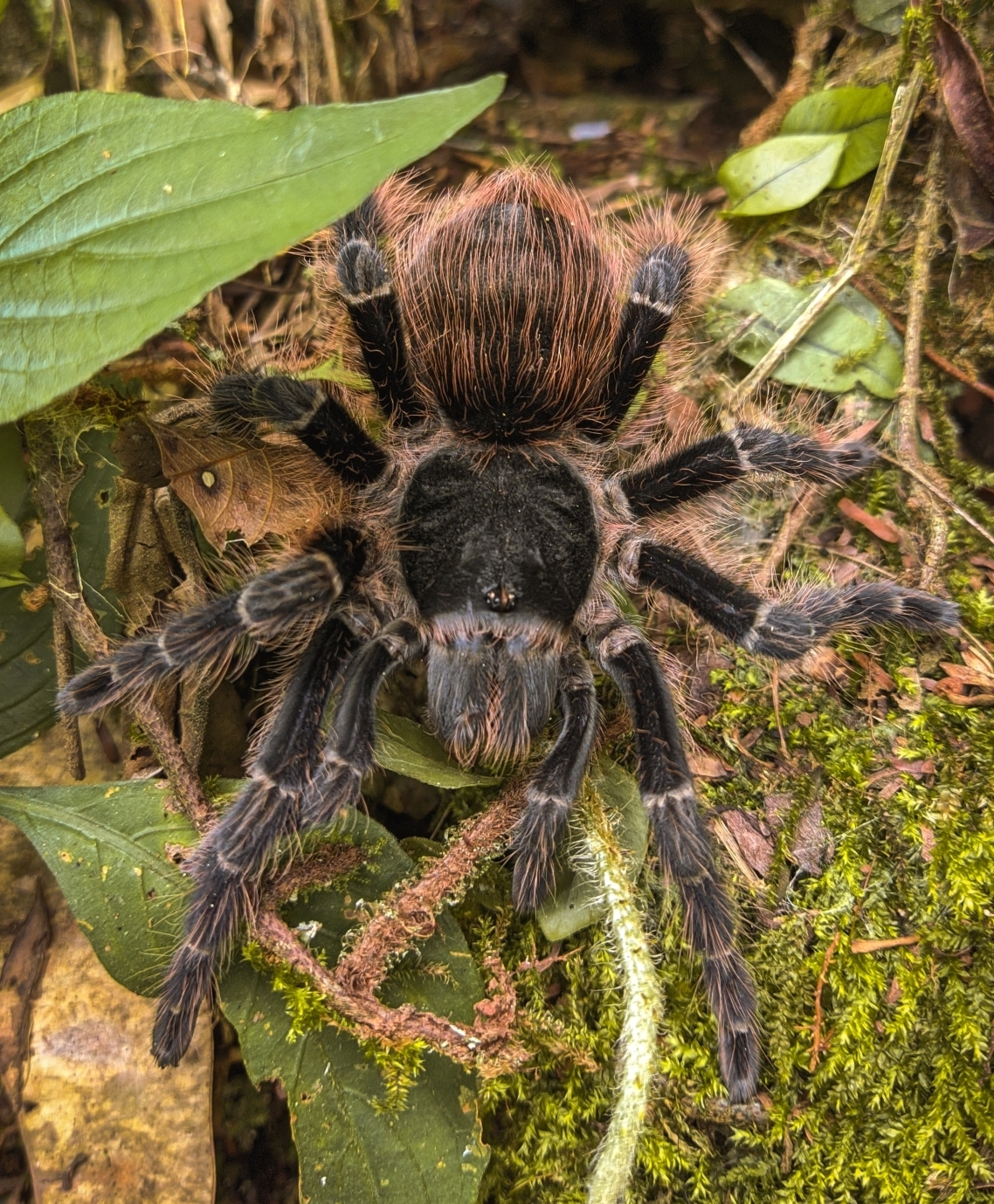
- female
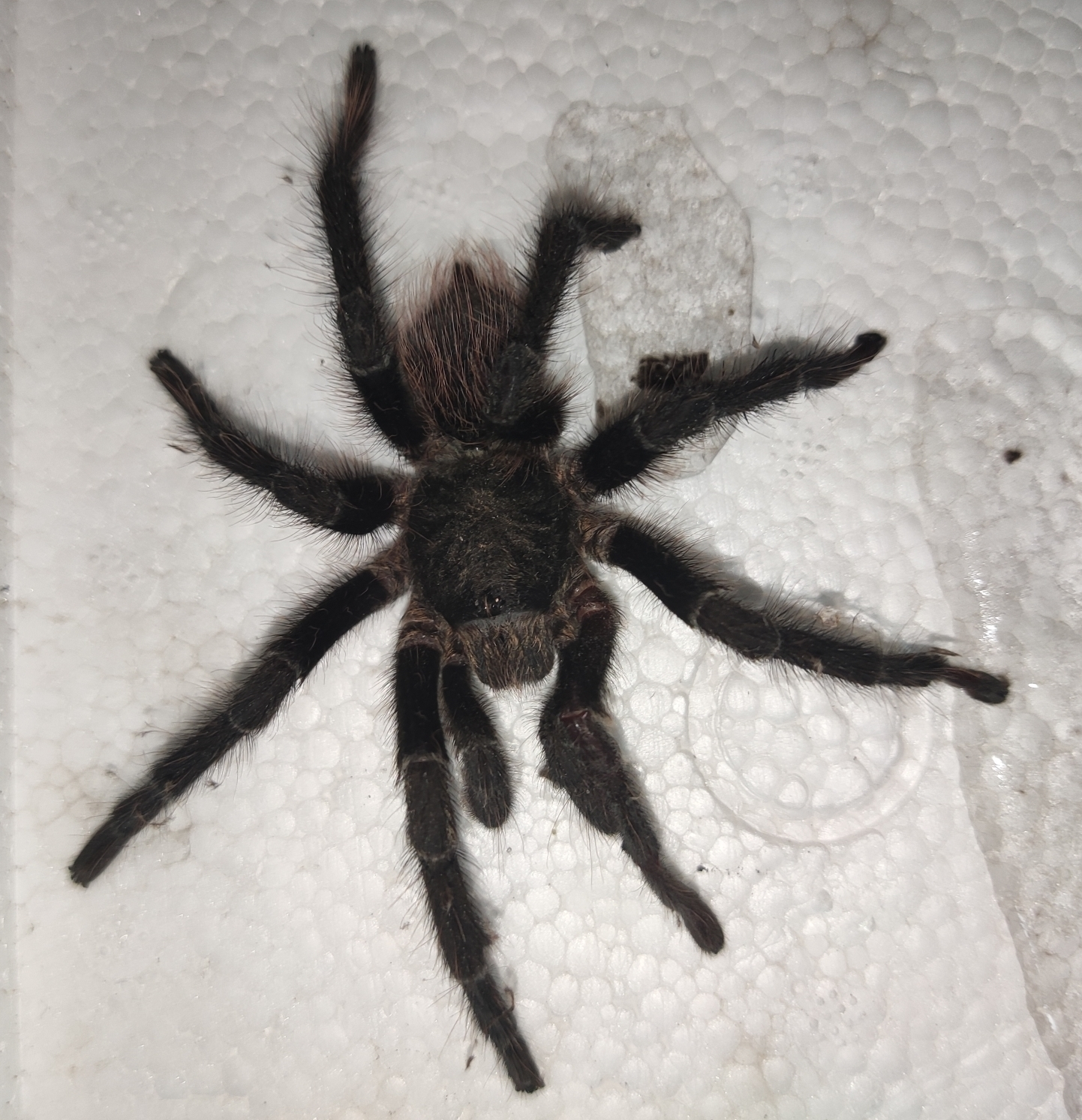
- male

Scientific classification
- Kingdom: Animalia
- Phylum: Arthropoda
- Subphylum: Chelicerata
- Class: Arachnida
- Order: Araneae
- Infraorder: Mygalomorphae
- Family: Theraphosidae
- Genus: Vitalius
- Species: V. buecherli

Binomial name
- Vitalius buecherli Bertani, 2001

= Vitalius buecherli =

Species of tarantula

Vitalius buecherli is a tarantula in the family Theraphosidae. It was first described by Rogério Bertani in 2001.

V. buecherli is found in São Paulo, Brazil in Juquitiba, in the forest of "Planalto Atlantico", in "Serra da Paranapiacaba". It is named after Wolfgang Bücherl (1911-1985), honoring his contributions to Brazilian mygalomorphs.

== Description ==
The carapace is brown, with some light brown bordering. The legs are dark brown. The sternum and abdomen are ventrally grayish, covered with long reddish hairs. Males can be distinguished from all Vitalius species except V. dubius by the noticeable prolateral superior keel in the palpal bulb, and females by the thin tibiae.

== Habitat ==
This tarantula can be found in the "Planalto Atlantico" forest, in "Serra da Paranapiacaba", the Atlantic forest is known as a biodiversity hotspot, it is the second largest rainforest in South America. Serra da Paranapiacaba being one of the best preserved forest remains. The vegetation is mountainous forest with a consistent amount of rainfall, with a little semi-deciduous and restinga forest.
