= Pamphobeteus fortis =

Scientific classification
- Kingdom: Animalia
- Phylum: Arthropoda
- Subphylum: Chelicerata
- Class: Arachnida
- Order: Araneae
- Infraorder: Mygalomorphae
- Family: Theraphosidae
- Genus: Pamphobeteus
- Species: P. fortis

Binomial name
- Pamphobeteus fortis (Ausserer, 1875)

Species of spider

Pamphobeteus fortis also known as the Colombian giant copperhead or Colombian giant brown tarantula is a tarantula which was first described by Anton Ausserer in 1875. As its common name aptly states it is found in Colombia, Venezuela and Panama.

== Description ==
Females live up to 15 years, while males only to 4. Their carapace is a copper colored, with some black stripping, with a black colored opisthosoma covered in copper like hairs. Their legs are also coppered colored, covered in hairs which are the similar to the ones found in the opisthosoma.

== Behavior ==
They are opportunistic burrowers, they will usually hide under an existing structure, making a burrow inside the structure. These tarantulas are a bit skittish, but are usually calm. If they feel threatened they will either make a threat pose or fling urticating hairs at your direction. These tarantulas are usually out in the open, but will go and hide if disturbed.
