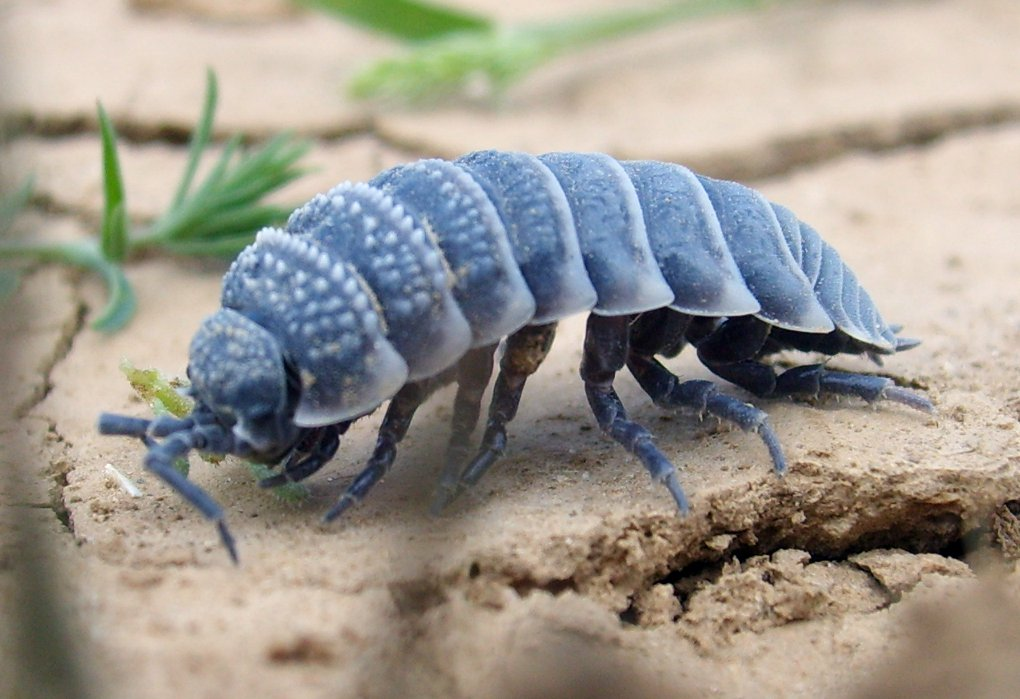
- Hemilepistus reaumuri

Scientific classification
- Kingdom: Animalia
- Phylum: Arthropoda
- Clade: Pancrustacea
- Class: Malacostraca
- Order: Isopoda
- Suborder: Oniscidea
- Family: Agnaridae
- Genus: Hemilepistus; Budde-Lund, 1879

= Hemilepistus =

Genus of woodlice

Hemilepistus is a genus of woodlice, first described by G. H. A. Budde-Lund in 1879 as a subgenus of Porcellio, but raised to the rank of genus by Karl Wilhelm Verhoeff in 1930. It contains the following species:

- Hemilepistus aphganicus Borutzky, 1958
- Hemilepistus buddelundi Borutzky, 1945
- Hemilepistus communis Borutzky, 1945
- Hemilepistus crenulatus (Pallas, 1771)
- Hemilepistus cristatus Budde-Lund, 1885
- Hemilepistus elongatus Budde-Lund, 1885
- Hemilepistus fedtschenkoi (Uljanin, 1875)
- Hemilepistus heptneri Borutzky, 1945
- Hemilepistus klugii (Brandt, 1833)
- Hemilepistus magnus Borutzky, 1945
- Hemilepistus nodosus Budde-Lund, 1885
- Hemilepistus pavlovskii Borutzky, 1954
- Hemilepistus reaumuri (Milne-Edwards, 1840)
- Hemilepistus reductus Borutzky, 1945
- Hemilepistus rhinoceros Borutzky, 1958
- Hemilepistus ruderalis (Pallas, 1771)
- Hemilepistus russonovae Borutzky, 1951
- Hemilepistus schirasi Lincoln, 1970
- Hemilepistus zachvatkini Verhoeff, 1930

The species are all endemic to Central Asia, except H. reaumuri, which is found from Syria to Algeria.
