= Longilyra =

Scientific classification
- Kingdom: Animalia
- Phylum: Arthropoda
- Subphylum: Chelicerata
- Class: Arachnida
- Order: Araneae
- Infraorder: Mygalomorphae
- Family: Theraphosidae
- Genus: Longilyra
- Species: L. johnlonghorni

Binomial name
- Longilyra johnlonghorni Gabriel, 2014

Genus of spiders

Longilyra is a genus of arachnids in the family Theraphosidae. It was first described in 2014 by Gabriel. As of 2017, it contains only one species, Longilyra johnlonghorni, found in El Salvador. This genus differs from the others as it has stridulatory bristles. It is different from those who have them on the same segments such as the Acanthoscurria genus because of the palpal bulb with a very short and acuminate embolus and four short keels, separated tibial apophysis. Females can be separated from the others by the spermathecae with two seminal receptacles with elongated ducts emerging from a common area.
