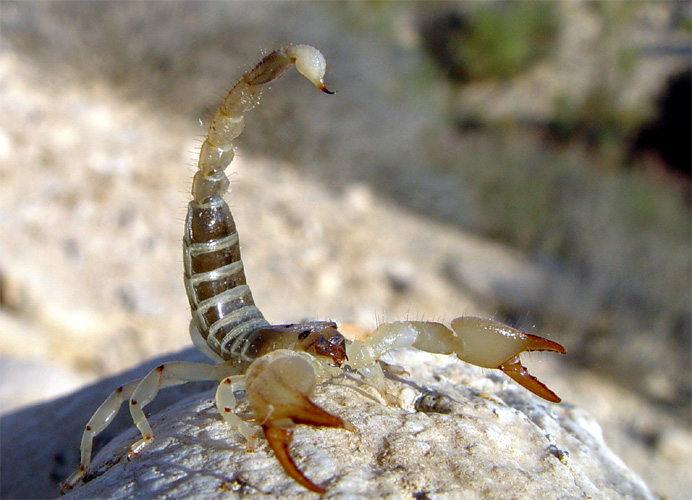
- Scorpio maurus palmatus

Scientific classification
- Kingdom: Animalia
- Phylum: Arthropoda
- Subphylum: Chelicerata
- Class: Arachnida
- Order: Scorpiones
- Family: Scorpionidae
- Genus: Scorpio
- Species: S. maurus

Binomial name
- Scorpio maurus Linnaeus, 1758

= Scorpio maurus =

Species of scorpion

Scorpio maurus is a species of North African and Middle Eastern scorpion, also known as the large-clawed scorpion, Israel golden scorpion, and lesser known as Zerachia scorpion.

This is a small/medium-sized scorpion 3 inches (76 mm) from the family Scorpionidae. It has a brown back and golden claws. There are many sub-species of this scorpion, 19 of which were described by Fet et al.

The venom of Scorpio maurus contains a high variety of toxins including proteases, phospholipases, protease inhibitors and potassium channel toxins δ-KTx. Although its venom contains a weak neurotoxin called maurotoxin, S. maurus is not a dangerous scorpion for humans. There are no records of fatalities.

== Habits ==
Found in very deep burrows in deserts and occasionally sparse woodland. Its habit of creating very deep burrows (up to 1 metre deep) means that in captivity this scorpion is often happiest with higher humidity: sand that is deep will be moist, thereby creating a comparatively humid burrow.
