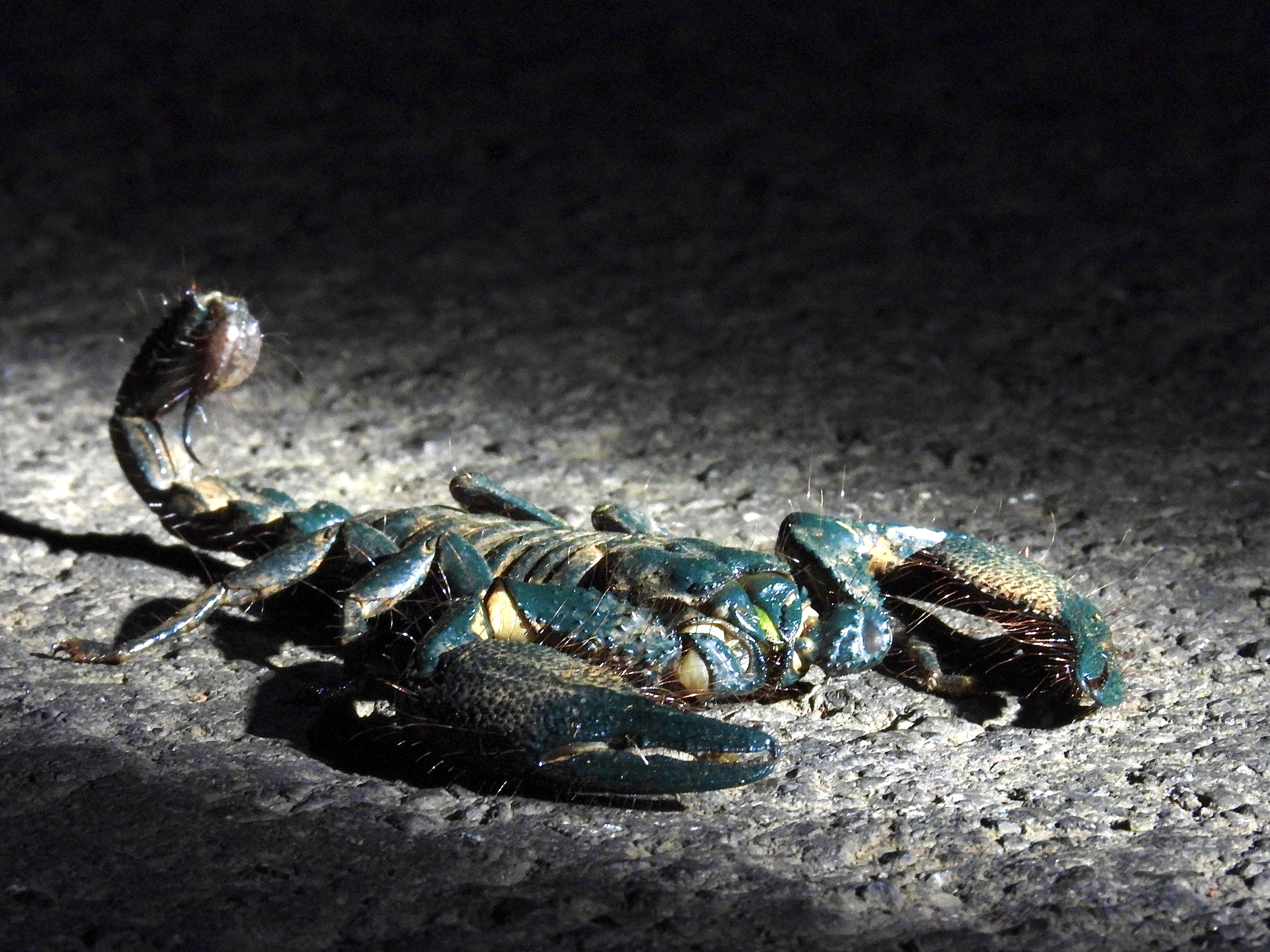
- Asian Forest Scorpion at Goregaon Raigad

Scientific classification
- Kingdom: Animalia
- Phylum: Arthropoda
- Subphylum: Chelicerata
- Class: Arachnida
- Order: Scorpiones
- Family: Scorpionidae
- Genus: Heterometrus
- Species: H. spinifer

Binomial name
- Heterometrus spinifer (Ehrenberg in Hemprich & Ehrenberg, 1828)

Synonyms
- Buthus spinifer Ehrenberg in Hemprich & Ehrenberg, 1828; Palamnaeus laevigatus Thorell, 1876; Palamnaeus oatesii Pocock, 1900

= Heterometrus spinifer =

Species of scorpion

Heterometrus spinifer, or its common name, Malaysian forest scorpion, is a species of scorpions belonging to the family Scorpionidae.

== Description ==
H. spinifer can reach a length around 10 to 12 cm (3.9 to 4.7 in). The body is shiny black with gray-green reflections. The pincers are highly developed. In captivity it feeds primarily on insects, mainly cockroaches, crickets, and locusts. Its venom can cause severe pain, and mild numbness in the affected area, but it is not typically lethal to humans. The venom has been found to contain spinoxin. These scorpions tend to be skittish and defensive, using their large pedipalps (pincers) to attack, more than their tails.

== Distribution and habitat ==
This species can be found in Southeast Asia, including Malaysia, Thailand, Indonesia, Cambodia, Vietnam, Sri Lanka, India, and other Southeast Asian countries . Generally, these terrestrial scorpions live in moist forests in the dark undergrowth under logs or other debris, and they burrow into the ground where they hide during the day.

== Captivity ==
The Asian Forest Scorpion is commonly kept in the pet trade due to its low venom toxicity and large size.
