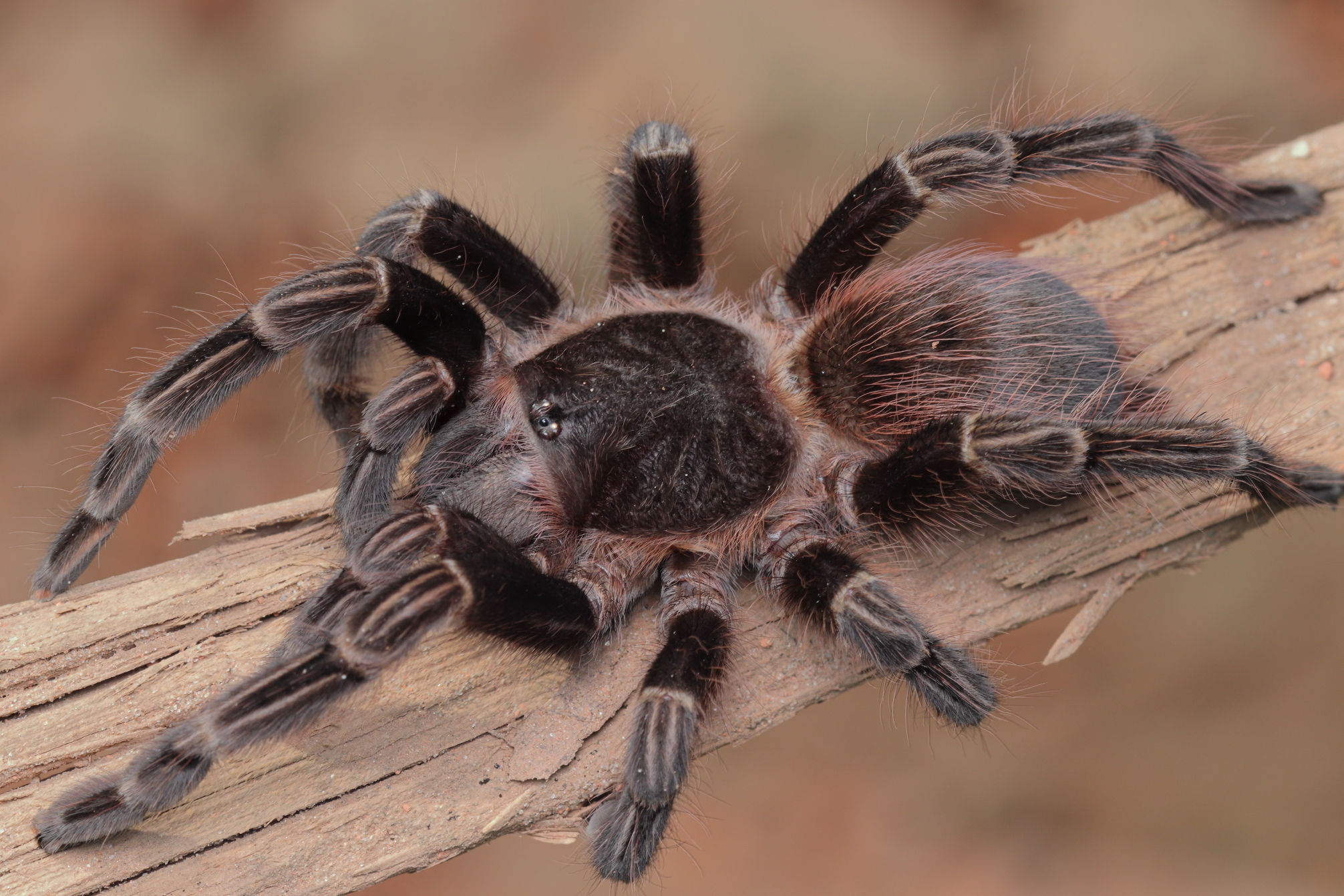
- T. wacketi

Scientific classification
- Kingdom: Animalia
- Phylum: Arthropoda
- Subphylum: Chelicerata
- Class: Arachnida
- Order: Araneae
- Infraorder: Mygalomorphae
- Family: Theraphosidae
- Genus: Tekoapora; Galleti-Lima, Hamilton, Borges & Guadanucci, 2023
- Species: T. wacketi

Binomial name
- Tekoapora wacketi (Mello-Leitão, 1923)

Synonyms
- Pterinopelma wacketi Mello-Leitão, 1923; Pamphobeteus insularis Mello-Leitão, 1923; Pamphobeteus masculus Piza, 1939; Pamphobeteus platyomma Bücherl, 1949; Pamphobeteus litoralis Piza, 1976; Vitalius platyomma Schmidt, 1993; Aphonopelma wacketi Schmidt, 1997; Vitalius wacketi Bertani, 2001

= Tekoapora =

Species of spider

Tekoapora is a monotypic genus of spiders in the family Theraphosidae. It contains the single species Tekoapora wacketi.

== Distribution ==
T. wacketi is endemic to the highlands (up to 1,100 m above sea level) of the Espinhaço Mountain range and States of Minas Gerais and Bahia, Brazil.

== Etymology ==
The genus name is derived from the Mbayá language term "tekoá porã" (meaning "good land"), which the Mbayá people originally used to refer to the Serra do Mar region.

The species is named after M. Wacket, who collected the male holotype in 1900.
