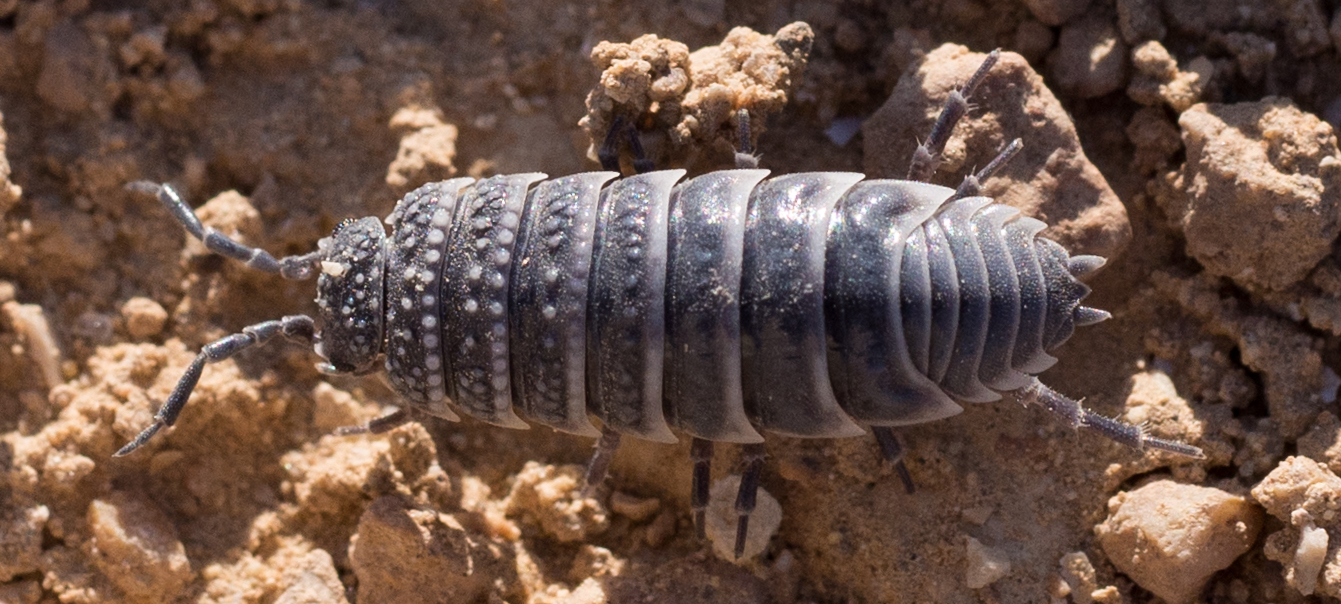
- Hemilepistus reaumuri

Scientific classification
- Kingdom: Animalia
- Phylum: Arthropoda
- Clade: Pancrustacea
- Class: Malacostraca
- Order: Isopoda
- Suborder: Oniscidea
- Section: Crinocheta
- Family: Agnaridae; Schmidt, 2003

= Agnaridae =

Family of woodlice

Agnaridae is a family of woodlice. They were formerly considered part of the Trachelipodidae, but were moved from that family to Porcellionidae in 1989, and then placed as a separate family in 2003.

== Genera ==
The family contains the following genera:

- Agnara Budde-Lund, 1908 (20 species)
- Desertoniscus Verhoeff, 1930 (13 species)
- Fossoniscus Strouhal, 1965 (monotypic)
- Hemilepistoides Borutzky, 1945 (monotypic)
- Hemilepistus Budde-Lund, 1879 (15 species)
- Koreoniscus Verhoeff, 1937 (2 species)
- Lucasioides Kwon, 1993 (30 species)
- Mongoloniscus Verhoeff, 1930 (17 species)
- Orthometopon Verhoeff, 1917 (9 species)
- Phalaba Budde-Lund, 1910 (3 species)
- Protracheoniscus Verhoeff, 1917 (68 species)
- Pseudoagnara Taiti & Ferrara, 2004 (2 species)
- Socotroniscus Ferrara & Taiti, 1996 (monotypic)
- Tadzhikoniscus Borutzky, 1976 (monotypic)
- Tritracheoniscus Taiti & Manicastri, 1985 (monotypic)
