= Maurotoxin =

Toxin in scorpions

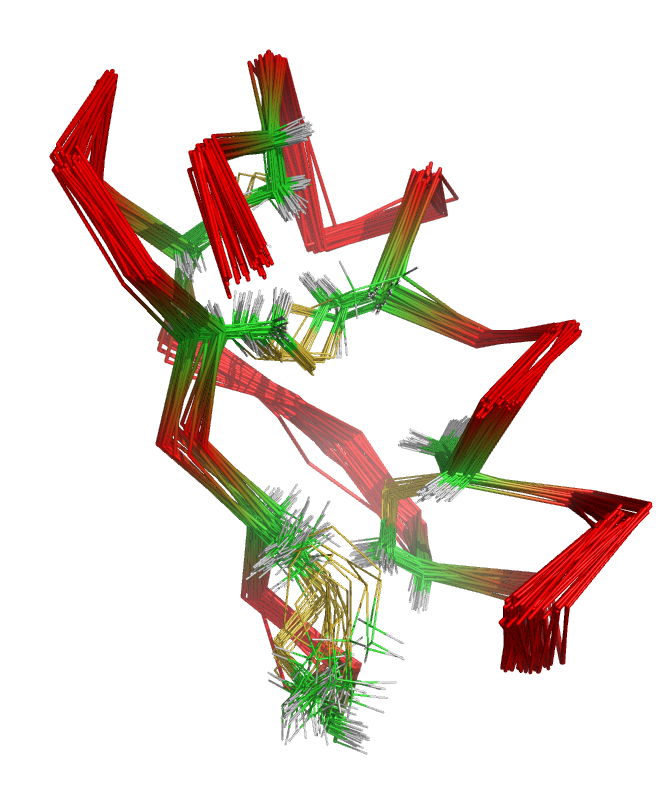
The protein NMR structure of maurotoxin, illustrating the fluctuations in the protein's native state in solution. The protein backbone is shown in red, the alpha carbons of the eight cysteine residues in green, and the disulfide bridges in yellow. Compare the disulfide bond connectivity to HsTx1 below.

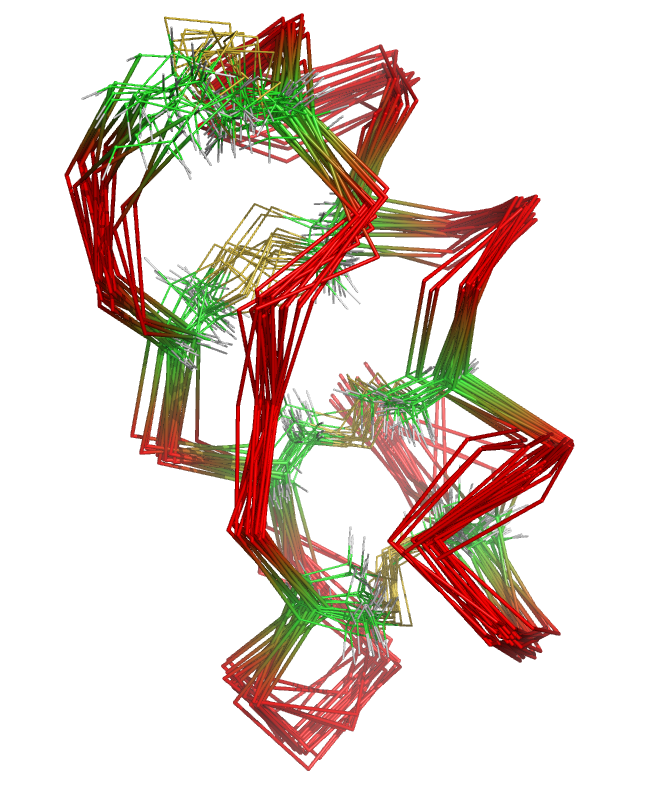
The protein NMR structure of HsTx1, a scorpion toxin with a canonical disulfide bond connectivity.

Maurotoxin (abbreviated MTX) is a peptide toxin from the venom of the Tunisian chactoid scorpion Scorpio maurus palmatus, from which it was first isolated and from which the chemical gets its name. It acts by blocking several types of voltage-gated potassium channel.

== Chemistry ==
Maurotoxin is a peptide of 34 amino acids (sequence VSCTGSKDCYAPCRKQTGCPNAKCINKSCKCYGC) cross-linked by four disulfide bridges (Cys3-Cys24, Cys9-Cys29, Cys13-Cys19, Cys31-Cys34), with an atypical pattern of organization compared with other scorpion toxins; this unusual pairing of cysteine residues may be mediated by the presence of adjacent prolines. The peptide contains an alpha helix linked by two disulfide bridges to a two-stranded antiparallel beta sheet.

== Target ==
Scorpion toxins constitute the largest group of potassium (K^{+}) channel blockers and are useful pharmacological probes to investigate ion channels and their functions.

Maurotoxin (MTX) blocks various K^{+} -channels:

- Apamin-sensitive small conductance Ca^{2+} - activated K^{+} channels (SK)
- Intermediate conductance Ca^{2+} - activated K^{+} channels (IK)
- Several types of voltage-gated potassium channels (Kv1.1, Kv1.2, Kv1.3 and shaker B)

The structural and pharmacological features of MTX suggest that MTX belongs to a new class of natural K^{+} channel blockers structurally intermediate between the Na^{+} (60–70 residues and four disulfide bridges) and K^{+} channel scorpion toxin families (less than 40 residues and three disulfide bridges).

The intermediate conductance Ca^{2+}-activated K^{+} (IK) channel is present in peripheral tissues, including secretory epithelia and blood cells. An important physiological role of the IK channel is to help maintain large electrical gradients for the sustained transport of ions such as Ca^{2+} that controls T lymphocyte (T cell) proliferation. Thus IK blockers could be potential immunosuppressants for the treatment of autoimmune disorders (such as rheumatoid arthritis, inflammatory bowel disease and multiple sclerosis).

== Mode of action ==
MTX occludes the pore region of various potassium channels (Kv1.2, IKCa1, Kv1.3) by establishing strong interactions between its lysine-23 residue and the glycine-tyrosine-glycine-aspartate (GYGD) motif of the channel. MTX thus blocks the channels by binding in the external vestibule of the pore to block the ion conduction pathway. Although Kv1.1, Kv1.2, and Kv1.3 have a very similar pore structure, they display different pharmacological sensitivity to MTX.
