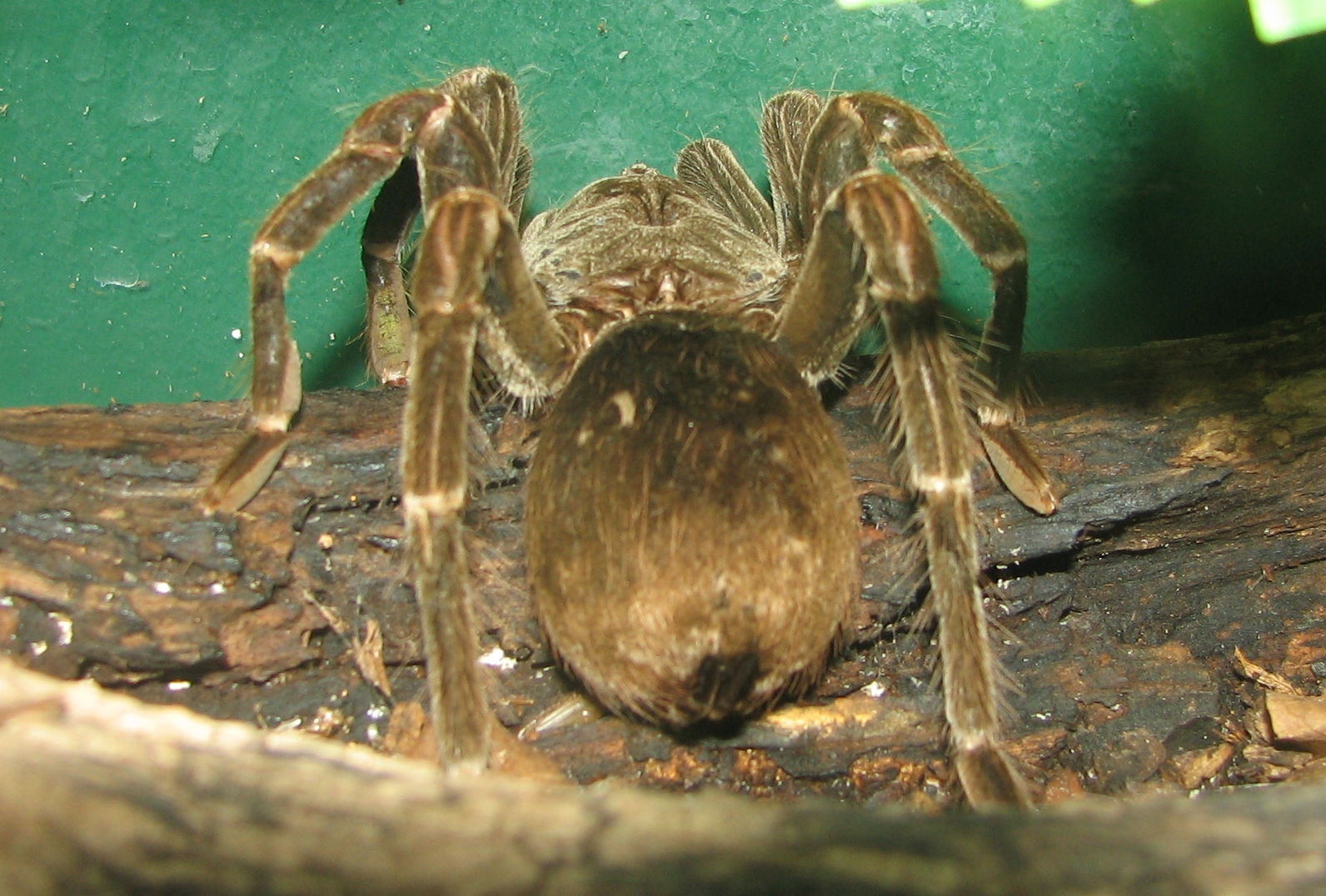

Scientific classification
- Kingdom: Animalia
- Phylum: Arthropoda
- Subphylum: Chelicerata
- Class: Arachnida
- Order: Araneae
- Infraorder: Mygalomorphae
- Family: Theraphosidae
- Genus: Pamphobeteus
- Species: P. nigricolor

Binomial name
- Pamphobeteus nigricolor (Ausserer, 1875)

= Pamphobeteus nigricolor =

Species of spider

Pamphobeteus nigricolor is a large species of tarantula found in Colombia, Peru and Brazil. First described in 1875 by Anton Ausserer as Lasiodora nigricolor, in 1901 Reginald Innes Pocock moved it to the new genus Pamphobeteus, and designated it as the genus's type species.
