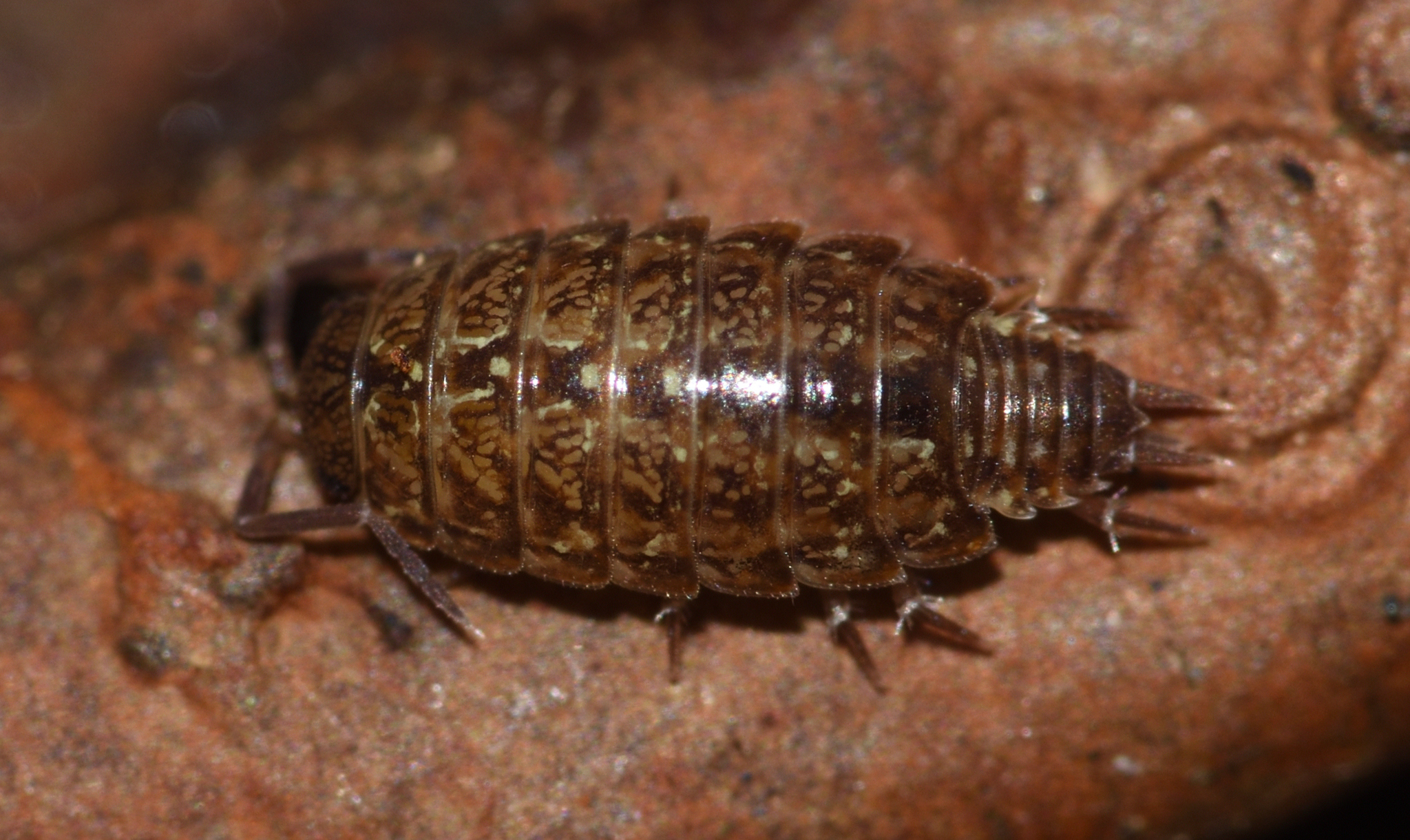

Scientific classification
- Kingdom: Animalia
- Phylum: Arthropoda
- Clade: Pancrustacea
- Class: Malacostraca
- Order: Isopoda
- Suborder: Oniscidea
- Family: Philosciidae
- Genus: Philoscia
- Species: P. affinis

Binomial name
- Philoscia affinis Verhoeff, 1908

= Philoscia affinis =

Species of woodlouse

Philoscia affinis is a species of isopod in the family Philosciidae.

== Description ==
Philoscia affinis is visually extremely similar to Philoscia muscorum. The coloration of the head and the body are indicators for identification, but reliable identification requires microscopic examination of 7th pereiopod of a male specimen.

== Range ==
Philoscia affinis is native to Europe, including Spain, France, Slovenia, Italy, Hungary, Germany, and Croatia, and Northern Africa including Algeria, and Tunisia.

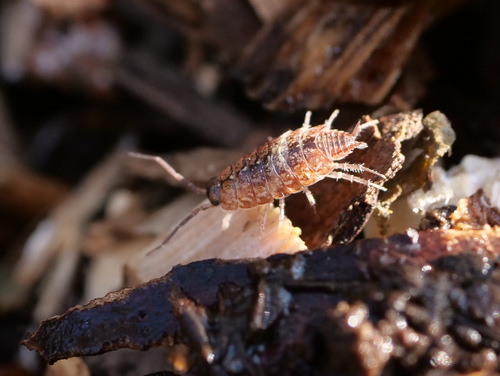
Philoscia affinis

== Habitat ==
Philoscia affinis prefers sites outside of metropolitan areas, such as forests and coastal grassland (while P. muscorum will generally favor open grasslands). Philoscia affinis will usually be found under rocks and rotting wood and leaves.

== Taxonomy ==
Philoscia affinis contains the following subspecies:

- Philoscia affinis affinis
- Philoscia affinis sabinorum
