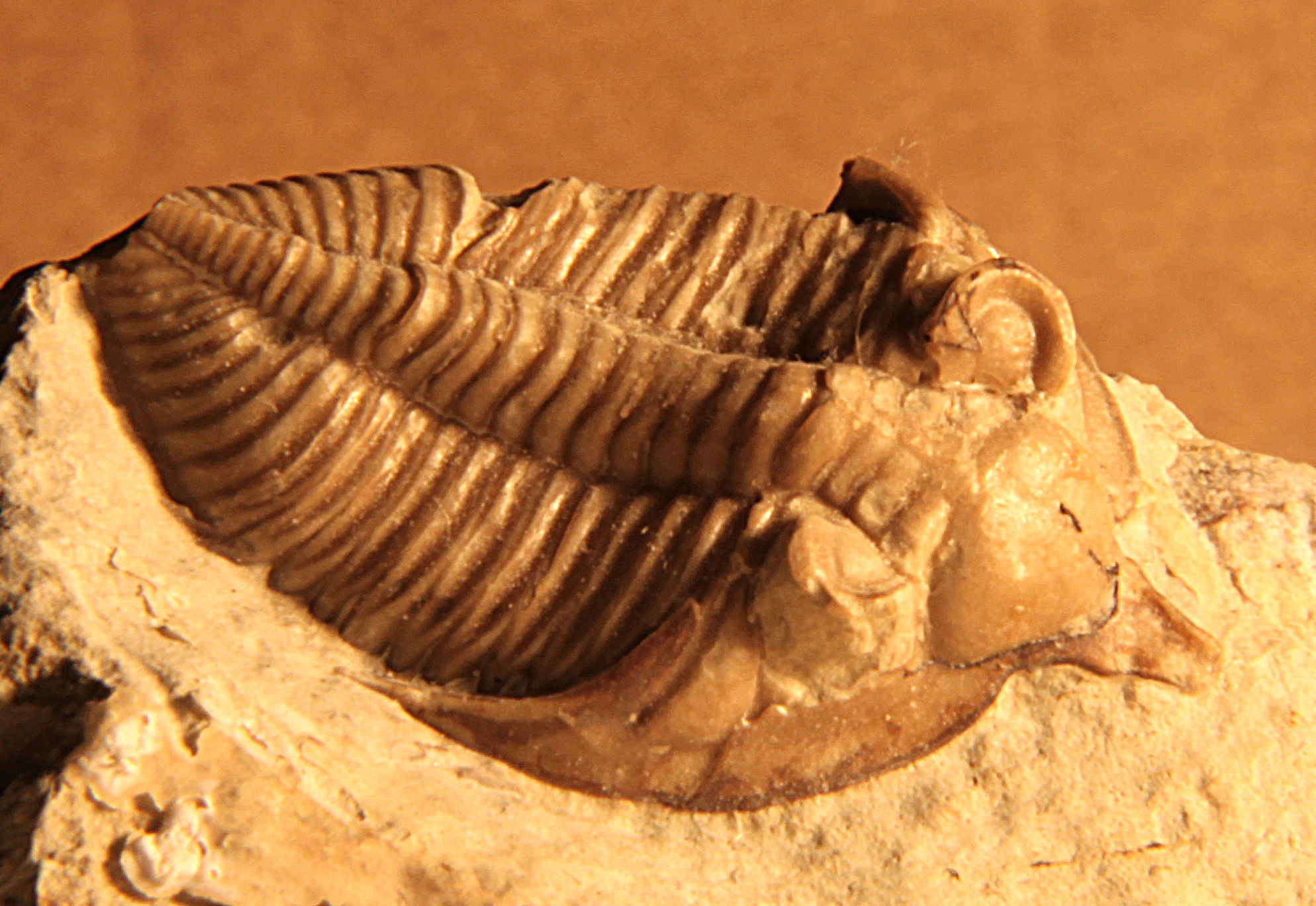
- Huntoniatonia oklahomae, 33mm

Scientific classification
- Domain: Eukaryota
- Kingdom: Animalia
- Phylum: Arthropoda
- Class: †Trilobita
- Order: †Phacopida
- Family: †Dalmanitidae
- Genus: †Huntoniatonia; Campbell, 2003

Species
- H. huntonensis (Ulrich and Delo, 1940); H. oklahomae (Richardson, 1949); H. lingulifer (Ulrich and Delo, 1940); H. purduei (Dunbar, 1919); H. xylabium (Campbell, 1977)

Synonyms
- Huntonia Campbell, 1977, (non Huntonia Vandel, 1973 a woodlouse)

= Huntoniatonia =

Huntoniatonia Temporal range: Lochkovian

Genus of trilobites

Huntoniatonia is genus of trilobites, an extinct group of marine arthropods of average to large size (up to 15 cm long).

== Description ==
Like all sighted Phacopina, Huntoniatonia has eyes with relatively large, individually set calcite lenses (so-called schizochroal eyes). The natural fracture lines coming from the back of the eye, cross the margin of the headshield (or cephalon) to the side (or proparian sutures in science jargon). From the front of the eye the sutures from both sides run along the edge of the central raised area (or glabella) into each other, and do not cross the margin of the cephalon, resulting in yoked free cheeks (or librigenae). Like in all Dalmanitidae, the articulated midsection of the body (or thorax) has 11 segments. The cephalon of Huntoniatonia has a broad, flat frontal margin, with an extension to the front, a bit like a dolphin. The frontal lobe of the moderately convex glabella is much wider and longer than the other three pairs of lobes, and the occipital ring, all of which are defined by distinct glabellar furrows, that except for the occipital furrow, do not cross the midline. The eyes are large half circles that originate from immediately posterior of the frontal lobe and end parallel to the front of the occipital ring. They contain close to 30 vertical rows of up to 8 lenses in each on a slightly convex surface with a clear socket at the base and narrow ridge along the top. Stout genal spines arch back at some distance from the tips of the pleural tips to the 7th thorax segment. The axis is about half as wide as each of the ribs (or pleurae) to its sides. The tailshield (or pygidium) has 12-13 rings. The axis, that extends into a rather narrow spine, has about 10 ribs that do not reach into the border. It has an entire margin.

== Taxonomy ==
Huntoniatonia may have been transitional between Dalmanites from the Silurian, and Odontochile from the Devonian.

The genus was renamed from Huntonia to Huntoniatonia in 2003 because the name was already occupied for an isopod genus, Huntonia (Philosciidae).

== Species ==
- Huntoniatonia huntonensis (Haragan formation, Oklahoma)
- Huntoniatonia oklahomae (Haragan, Oklahoma)
- Huntoniatonia lingulifer (Bois d'Arc Formation)
