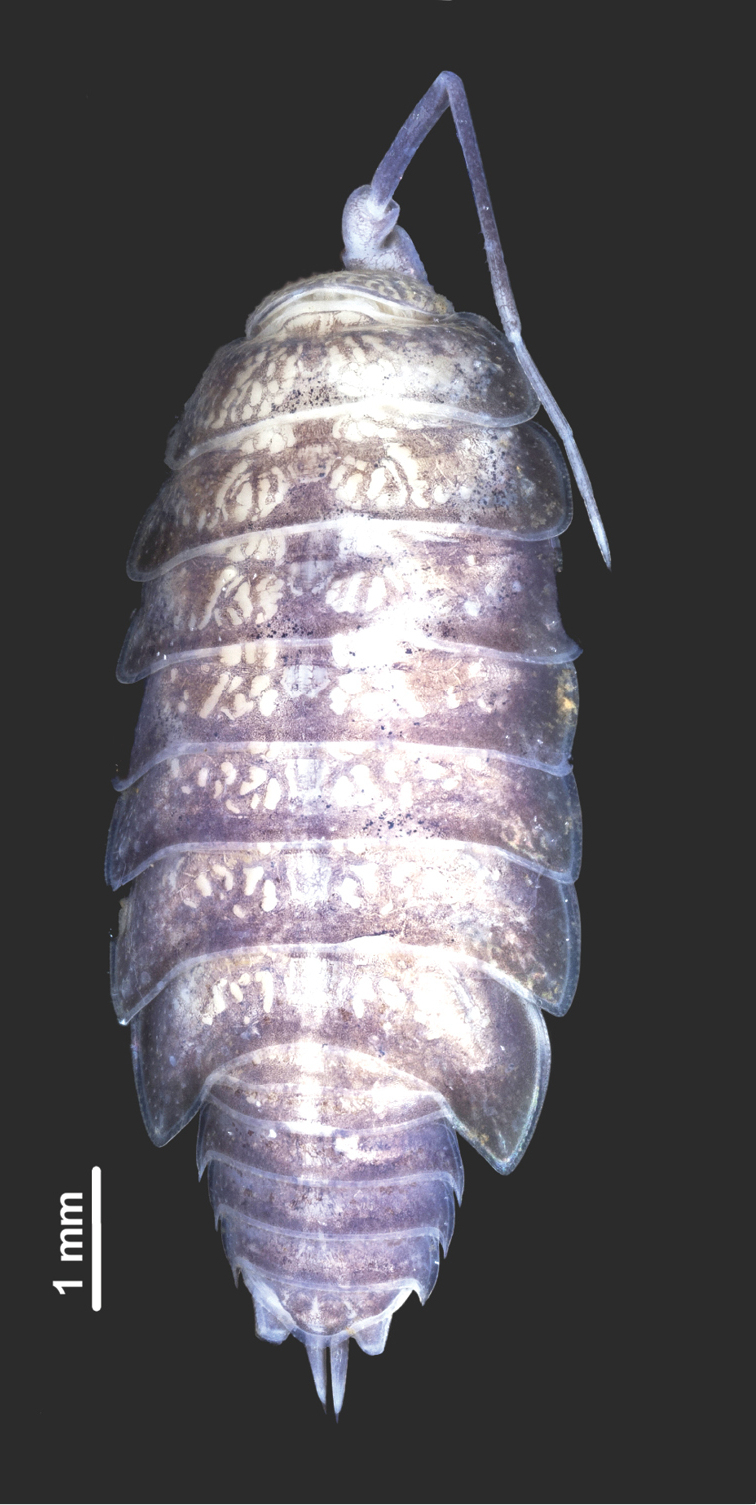
- Female paratype

Scientific classification
- Kingdom: Animalia
- Phylum: Arthropoda
- Class: Malacostraca
- Order: Isopoda
- Suborder: Oniscidea
- Family: Philosciidae
- Genus: Hawaiioscia
- Species: H. rapui

Binomial name
- Hawaiioscia rapui Taiti & Wynne, 2015

= Hawaiioscia rapui =

Endemic Polynesian Woodlouse

Hawaiioscia rapui is a species of terrestrial isopod endemic to the islands of Rapa Nui and Motu Motiro Hiva in the South Pacific Ocean. The animal's current range is collectively known as the Rapa Nui Marine Protected Area. The epithet, "rapui", honors Sergio Rapu Haoa, a humanitarian, archaeologist, anthropologist, and politician of Rapanui descent. This species was initially considered a relict species known only to Rapa Nui caves. Specimens collected in 2016 revealed it also occurs in littoral habitats on the north shore of Rapa Nui and on Motu Motiro Hiva, a small uninhabited island 414 km east by northeast of Rapa Nui. Given the range extension into littoral areas, this isopod is considered a halophilic species. Although determining how this animal dispersed between Rapa Nui and Motu Mitiro Hiva will require additional research, it is tentatively considered a "Canoe Bug". This name is derived from the Canoe Bug Hypothesis which holds this species colonized these islands alongside ancient Polynesians via transplanted "Canoe Plants" such as banana, taro, and breadfruit. Styloniscus manuvaka, another "Canoe Bug", is the only other native isopod species known to Rapa Nui.

On Rapa Nui, Hawaiioscia rapui faces threats such as further habitat loss, non-native species competition, and global climate change. Presently, the Motu Motiro Hiva population may be somewhat buffered from completion with non-native species, but monitoring and continued study will be required for the early detection of non-native competitor species.
