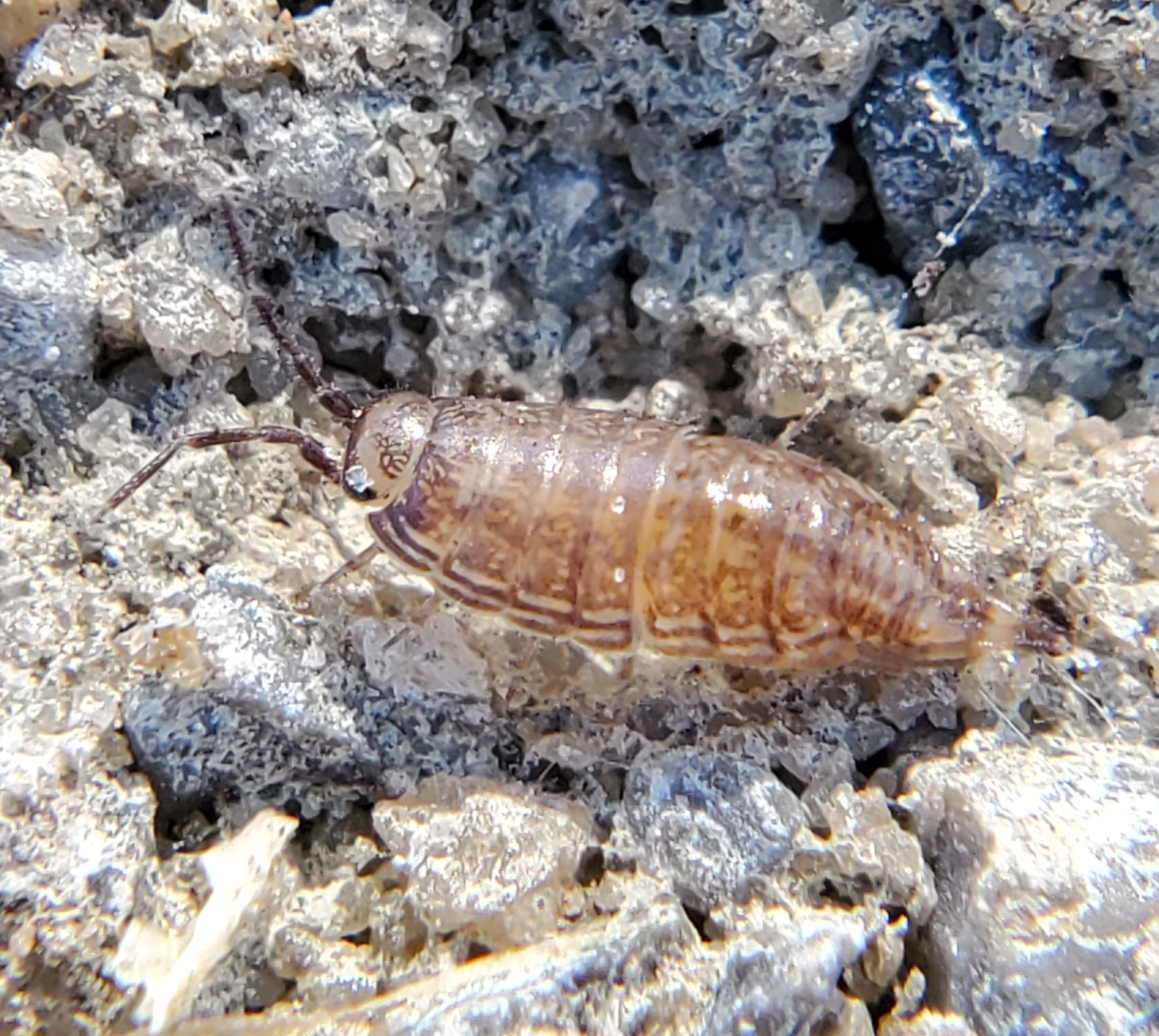

Scientific classification
- Kingdom: Animalia
- Phylum: Arthropoda
- Class: Malacostraca
- Order: Isopoda
- Suborder: Oniscidea
- Family: Philosciidae
- Genus: Atlantoscia
- Species: A. floridana

Binomial name
- Atlantoscia floridana (Van Name, 1940)

= Atlantoscia floridana =

Species of woodlouse

Atlantoscia floridana is a species of woodlouse in the family Philosciidae. It is found in North America, Africa, and South America.

They can be fragile but are naturally rich in calcium. In the terrarium, they prefer medium humidity and separate dry and wet living sections.
