= Littorophiloscia vittata =

Scientific classification
- Kingdom: Animalia
- Phylum: Arthropoda
- Clade: Pancrustacea
- Class: Malacostraca
- Order: Isopoda
- Suborder: Oniscidea
- Family: Halophilosciidae
- Genus: Littorophiloscia
- Species: L. vittata

Binomial name
- Littorophiloscia vittata (Say, 1818)

Synonyms
- Philoscia vittata Say, 1818

Species of crustacean

Littorophiloscia vittata is a species of woodlouse in the family Halophilosciidae. It is native to the east coast of North America, generally under boards and other debris in saltmarshes.
