= Congophiloscia annobonensis =

Scientific classification
- Kingdom: Animalia
- Phylum: Arthropoda
- Clade: Pancrustacea
- Class: Malacostraca
- Order: Isopoda
- Suborder: Oniscidea
- Family: Philosciidae
- Genus: Congophiloscia
- Species: C. annobonensis

Binomial name
- Congophiloscia annobonensis Schmalfuss & Ferrara, 1978

Species of woodlouse

Congophiloscia annobonensis is a species of land crustacean isopods, in the family Philosciidae. The species was named by Helmut Schmalfuss and Franco Ferrara in 1978. The species is endemic to the island of Annobón in Equatorial Guinea.
