= Congophiloscia saothomensis =

Scientific classification
- Kingdom: Animalia
- Phylum: Arthropoda
- Clade: Pancrustacea
- Class: Malacostraca
- Order: Isopoda
- Suborder: Oniscidea
- Family: Philosciidae
- Genus: Congophiloscia
- Species: C. saothomensis

Binomial name
- Congophiloscia saothomensis Schmalfuss & Ferrara, 1978

Species of woodlouse

Congophiloscia saothomensis is a species of crustacean isopods, in the family Philosciidae. The species was named by Helmut Schmalfuss and Franco Ferrara in 1978. The species is endemic to São Tomé and Príncipe.
