= Littorophiloscia richardsonae =

Scientific classification
- Kingdom: Animalia
- Phylum: Arthropoda
- Clade: Pancrustacea
- Class: Malacostraca
- Order: Isopoda
- Suborder: Oniscidea
- Family: Halophilosciidae
- Genus: Littorophiloscia
- Species: L. richardsonae

Binomial name
- Littorophiloscia richardsonae (Holmes & Gay, 1909)

Species of crustacean

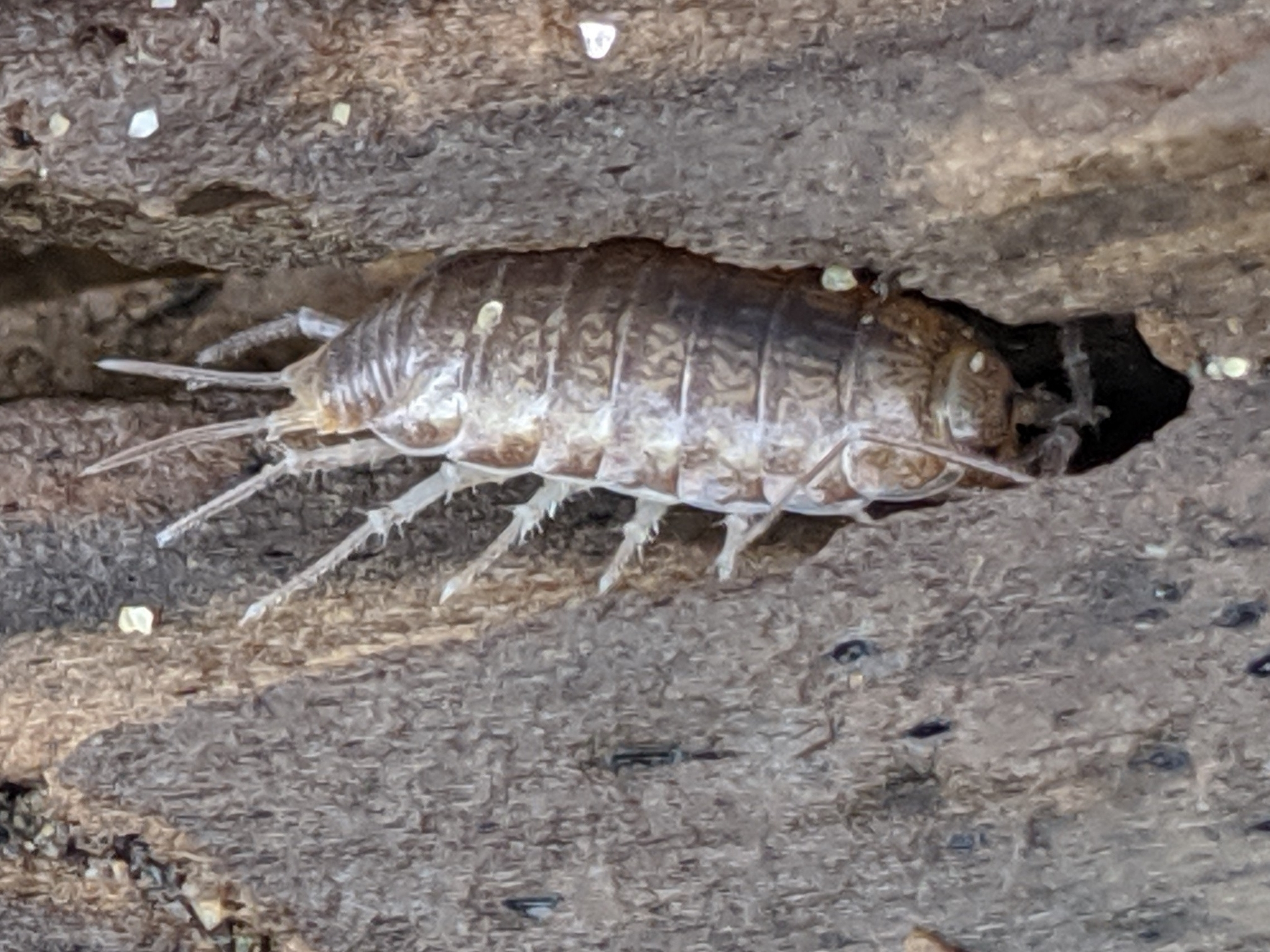

Littorophiloscia richardsonae is a species of woodlouse in the family Halophilosciidae. It is found in North America and Mexico.
