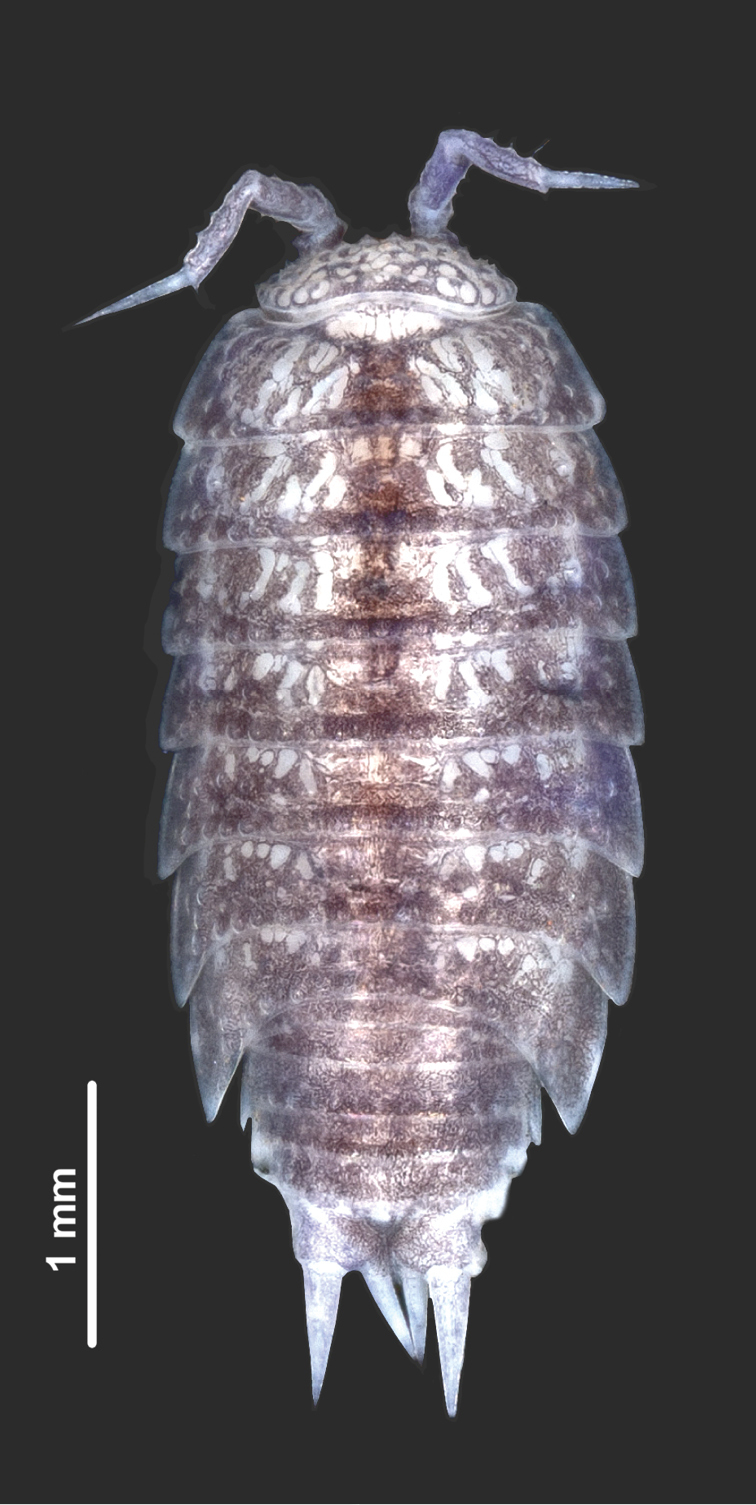
- Styloniscus manuvaka female paratype

Scientific classification
- Kingdom: Animalia
- Phylum: Arthropoda
- Class: Malacostraca
- Order: Isopoda
- Suborder: Oniscidea
- Family: Styloniscidae
- Genus: Styloniscus
- Species: S. manuvaka

Binomial name
- Styloniscus manuvaka Taiti & Wynne, 2015

= Styloniscus manuvaka =

Endemic Polynesian Woodlouse

Styloniscus manuvaka is a species of terrestrial isopod endemic to the islands of Rapa Nui and Rapa Iti. Its name is an epithet in the Rapa Nui language that translates roughly to "Canoe Bug". The name references the Canoe Bug Hypothesis which holds this species colonized these islands alongside ancient Polynesians via transplanted "Canoe Plants" such as banana, taro, and breadfruit. While this species is presently known only by relict populations in caves on Rapa Nui, its status on Rapa Iti is unknown. Another "Canoe Bug", Hawaiioscia rapui, is the only other terrestrial isopod species native to Rapa Nui.

Styloniscus manuvaka is in need of conservation measures, as its persistence is likely threatened by a combination of habitat loss, non-native species, and global climate change.

The Darwin200 project will survey for this species and other potential canoe bug species on Rapa Nui, Pitcairn, and Mangareva islands in June 2024.
