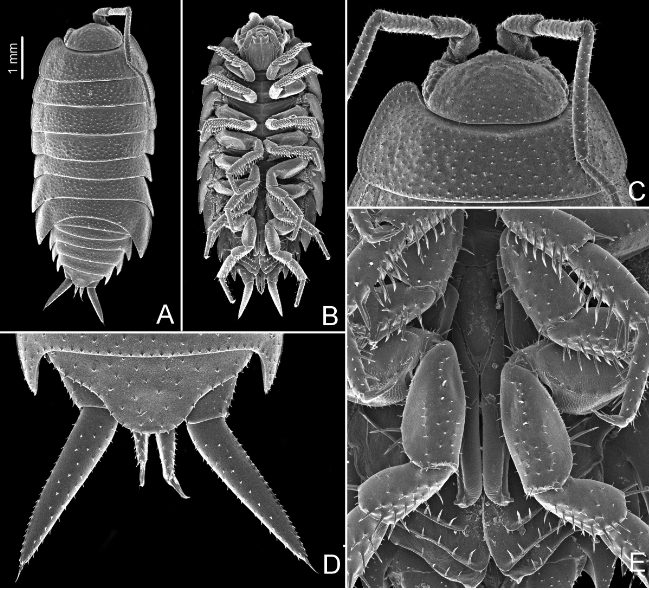

Scientific classification
- Kingdom: Animalia
- Phylum: Arthropoda
- Clade: Pancrustacea
- Class: Malacostraca
- Order: Isopoda
- Suborder: Oniscidea
- Family: Philosciidae
- Genus: Hawaiioscia
- Species: H. nicoyaensis

Binomial name
- Hawaiioscia nicoyaensis Taiti et al., 2018

= Hawaiioscia nicoyaensis =

Costa Rican Woodlouse

Hawaiioscia nicoyaensis is a species of woodlouse from Costa Rica. Its specific epithet is derived from the location of its type locality along the Gulf of Nicoya. It is the only known member of its genus to be found on a continent rather than a pacific island and the only one to be littoral halophilic. Furthermore, it is the only extant member of its genus not to be restricted to caves.
