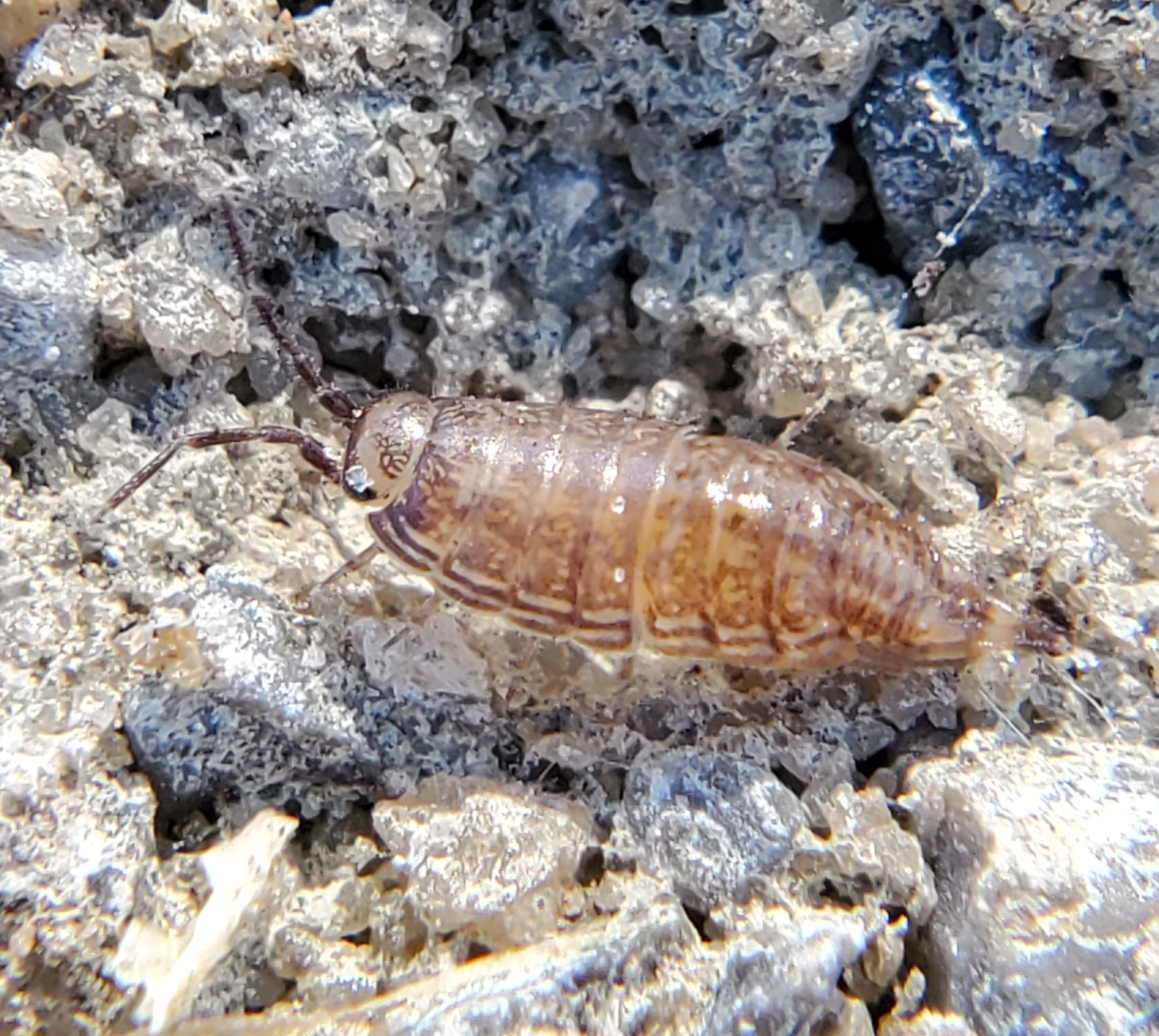
- Atlantoscia floridana

Scientific classification
- Kingdom: Animalia
- Phylum: Arthropoda
- Class: Malacostraca
- Order: Isopoda
- Suborder: Oniscidea
- Family: Philosciidae
- Genus: Atlantoscia; Ferrara & Taiti, 1981

= Atlantoscia =

Genus of woodlice

Atlantoscia is a genus of woodlice in the family Philosciidae. There are about seven described species in Atlantoscia.

== Species ==
These seven species belong to the genus Atlantoscia:

- Atlantoscia floridana (Van Name, 1940)
- Atlantoscia inflata Campos-Filho & Araujo, 2015
- Atlantoscia ituberasensis Campos-Filho, Lisboa & Araujo, 2013
- Atlantoscia meloi Campos-Filho & Araujo, 2015
- Atlantoscia petronioi Campos-Filho, Contreira & Lopes-Leitzke, 2012
- Atlantoscia rubromarginata Araujo & Leistikow, 1999
- Atlantoscia sulcata Campos-Filho, Lisboa & Araujo, 2013
