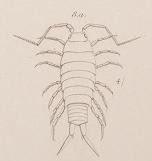
- S. longistylis

Scientific classification
- Kingdom: Animalia
- Phylum: Arthropoda
- Class: Malacostraca
- Order: Isopoda
- Suborder: Oniscidea
- Family: Styloniscidae
- Genus: Styloniscus; Dana, 1853

Type species
- Styloniscus longistylis Dana, 1853

Synonyms
- Antarctoniscus Paulian de Félice, 1940; Microniscus Dollfus, 1890 non Müller, 1871; Oligoniscus Dollfus, 1890; Patagoniscus Verhoeff, 1939

= Styloniscus =

Genus of woodlice

Styloniscus is a genus of woodlice in the family Styloniscidae. It contains the following species as of 2010:

- Styloniscus araucanicus (Verhoeff, 1939)
- Styloniscus australiensis Vandel, 1973
- Styloniscus australis (Dollfus, 1890)
- Styloniscus austroafricanus (Barnard, 1932)
- Styloniscus capensis (Barnard, 1932)
- Styloniscus cestus (Barnard, 1932)
- Styloniscus commensalis (Chilton, 1910)
- Styloniscus georgensis (Barnard, 1932)
- Styloniscus hirsutus Green, 1971
- Styloniscus horae (Barnard, 1932)
- Styloniscus hottentoti (Barnard, 1932)
- Styloniscus iheringi (Verhoeff, 1951)
- Styloniscus insulanus Ferrara & Taiti, 1983
- Styloniscus japonicus Nunomura, 2000
- Styloniscus jeanneli (Paulian de Felice, 1940)
- Styloniscus katakurai Nunomura, 2007
- Styloniscus kermadecensis (Chilton, 1911)
- Styloniscus longistylis Dana, 1853
- Styloniscus maculosus Green, 1961
- Styloniscus magellanicus Dana, 1853
- Styloniscus mauritiensis (Barnard, 1936)
- Styloniscus manuvaka Taiti & Wynne, 2015
- Styloniscus monocellatus (Dollfus, 1890)
- Styloniscus moruliceps (Barnard, 1932)
- Styloniscus murrayi Dollfus, 1890
- Styloniscus natalensis (Barnard, 1932)
- Styloniscus nordenskjoeldi (Verhoeff, 1939)
- Styloniscus otakensis (Chilton, 1901)
- Styloniscus pallidus (Verhoeff, 1939)
- Styloniscus phormianus (Chilton, 1901)
- Styloniscus planus Green, 1971
- Styloniscus riversdalei (Barnard, 1932)
- Styloniscus romanorum Vandel, 1973
- Styloniscus schwabei (Verhoeff, 1939)
- Styloniscus simplex Vandel, 1981
- Styloniscus simrothi (Verhoeff, 1939)
- Styloniscus spinosus (Patience, 1907)
- Styloniscus squarrosus Green, 1961
- Styloniscus swellendami (Barnard, 1932)
- Styloniscus sylvestris Green, 1971
- Styloniscus tabulae (Barnard, 1932)
- Styloniscus thomsoni (Chilton, 1885)
- Styloniscus ventosus (Barnard, 1932)
- Styloniscus verrucosus (Budde-Lund, 1906)
