= Congophiloscia =

Scientific classification
- Kingdom: Animalia
- Phylum: Arthropoda
- Clade: Pancrustacea
- Class: Malacostraca
- Order: Isopoda
- Suborder: Oniscidea
- Family: Philosciidae
- Genus: Congophiloscia; Arcangeli, 1950

Species
- Congophiloscia albofasciata Arcangeli, 1950; Congophiloscia annobonensis Schmalfuss & Ferrara, 1978; Congophiloscia bolamae Schmalfuss & Ferrara, 1978; Congophiloscia longiantennata Schmalfuss & Ferrara, 1978; Congophiloscia saothomensis Schmalfuss & Ferrara, 1978; Congophiloscia striata Ferrara & Schmalfuss, 1983

Genus of woodlice

Congophiloscia is a genus of crustacean isopods, in the family Philosciidae.
