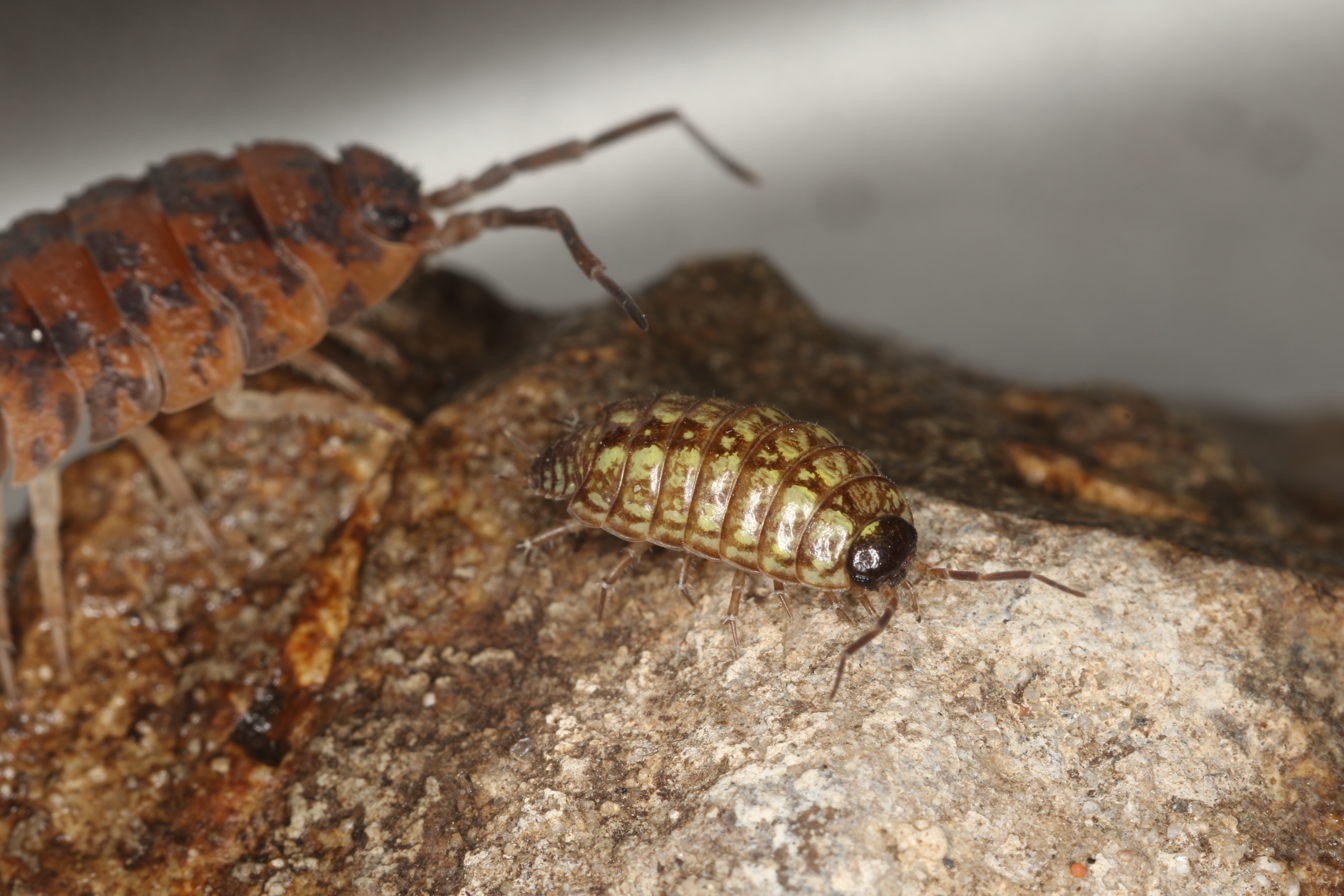
- Philoscia muscorum

Scientific classification
- Kingdom: Animalia
- Phylum: Arthropoda
- Class: Malacostraca
- Order: Isopoda
- Suborder: Oniscidea
- Family: Philosciidae
- Genus: Philoscia; Latreille, 1804

= Philoscia =

Genus of woodlice

Philoscia is a genus of woodlice in the family Philosciidae. There are more than 80 described species in Philoscia.

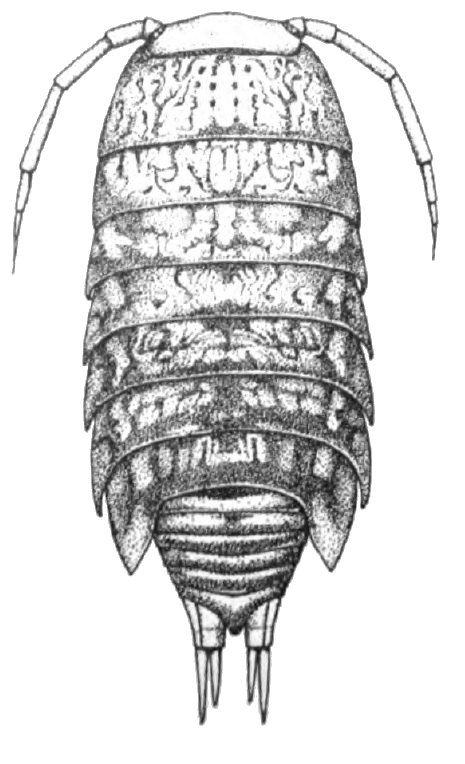
Philoscia jacobsoni

== Species ==
These 81 species belong to the genus Philoscia:

- Philoscia affinis Verhoeff, 1909
- Philoscia algirica Dollfus, 1896
- Philoscia anienana Verhoeff, 1933
- Philoscia australis Richardson Searle, 1914
- Philoscia bermudensis Dahl, 1892
- Philoscia bonariensis Gambiagi de Calabrese, 1935
- Philoscia brevicorpore Wahrberg, 1922
- Philoscia briani Moreira, 1927
- Philoscia buddelundi Searle, 1922
- Philoscia calabrica Strouhal, 1937
- Philoscia camerunica Pualian de Félice, 1940
- Philoscia canalensis Verhoeff, 1926
- Philoscia colimensis Mulaik, 1960
- Philoscia contoyensis Mulaik, 1960
- Philoscia ctenoscioides Mulaik, 1960
- Philoscia dalmatica Verhoeff, 1901
- Philoscia debilis Budde-Lund, 1893
- Philoscia demerarae Van Name, 1925
- Philoscia diminuta Budde-Lund, 1893
- Philoscia dobakholi Chopra, 1924
- Philoscia dongarrensis Wahrberg, 1922
- Philoscia ehrenbergii Brandt, 1833
- Philoscia elephantina Paulian de Félice, 1940
- Philoscia faucium Verhoeff, 1918
- Philoscia flava Budde-Lund, 1913
- Philoscia formosa Mulaik, 1960
- Philoscia formosana Verhoeff
- Philoscia fulva Barnard, 1932
- Philoscia geayi Paulian de Felice, 1944
- Philoscia geiseri Van Name, 1936
- Philoscia gracilior Paulian de Felice, 1944
- Philoscia guerrerense Mulaik, 1960
- Philoscia guerrerensis Mulaik, 1960
- Philoscia guttata Wahrberg, 1922
- Philoscia heroldi Verhoeff, 1936
- Philoscia hirta Wahrberg, 1922
- Philoscia humboldtii Verhoeff, 1926
- Philoscia incerta Arcangeli, 1932
- Philoscia incurva Budde-Lund, 1902
- Philoscia inquilina Van Name, 1936
- Philoscia jacobsoni Searle, 1922
- Philoscia javanensis Searle
- Philoscia karrakattensis Wahrberg, 1922
- Philoscia kartaboana Van Name, 1936
- Philoscia lata Paulian de Félice, 1940
- Philoscia lifuensis Stebbing, 1900
- Philoscia lodnensis Ramakrishna, 1969
- Philoscia longicaudata Wahrberg, 1922
- Philoscia lubricata Budde-Lund, 1894
- Philoscia marmorata Brandt, 1833
- Philoscia mattereusis
- Philoscia maxima Wahrberg, 1922
- Philoscia mendica Budde-Lund, 1898
- Philoscia minutissima Boone, 1918
- Philoscia molisia Verhoeff, 1933
- Philoscia moneaguensis Van Name, 1936
- Philoscia monticola Verhoeff, 1926
- Philoscia muscorum (Scopoli, 1763) (common striped woodlouse)
- Philoscia myrmecophila Wahrberg, 1922
- Philoscia nebulosa Paulian de Felice, 1940
- Philoscia novaezealandiae Filhol, 1885
- Philoscia novaezelandiae Filhol, 1885
- Philoscia paniensis Verhoeff, 1926
- Philoscia pannonica Verhoeff, 1909
- Philoscia perlata Wahrberg, 1922
- Philoscia persona Jackson, 1938
- Philoscia pubescens (Dana, 1853)
- Philoscia robusta Schultz
- Philoscia roraimae Van Name, 1936
- Philoscia sacchari David, 1967
- Philoscia salina Baker, 1926
- Philoscia sassandrai Paulian de Félice, 1940
- Philoscia seriepunctata Budde-Lund, 1893
- Philoscia simplex Verhoeff, 1951
- Philoscia squamosa Jackson, 1938
- Philoscia squamuligera Koelbel, 1895
- Philoscia tenuissima Collinge, 1915
- Philoscia truncatella Budde-Lund, 1902
- Philoscia univittata Strouhal, 1937
- Philoscia veracruzana Mulaik, 1960
- Philoscia weberi Dollfus, 1907
