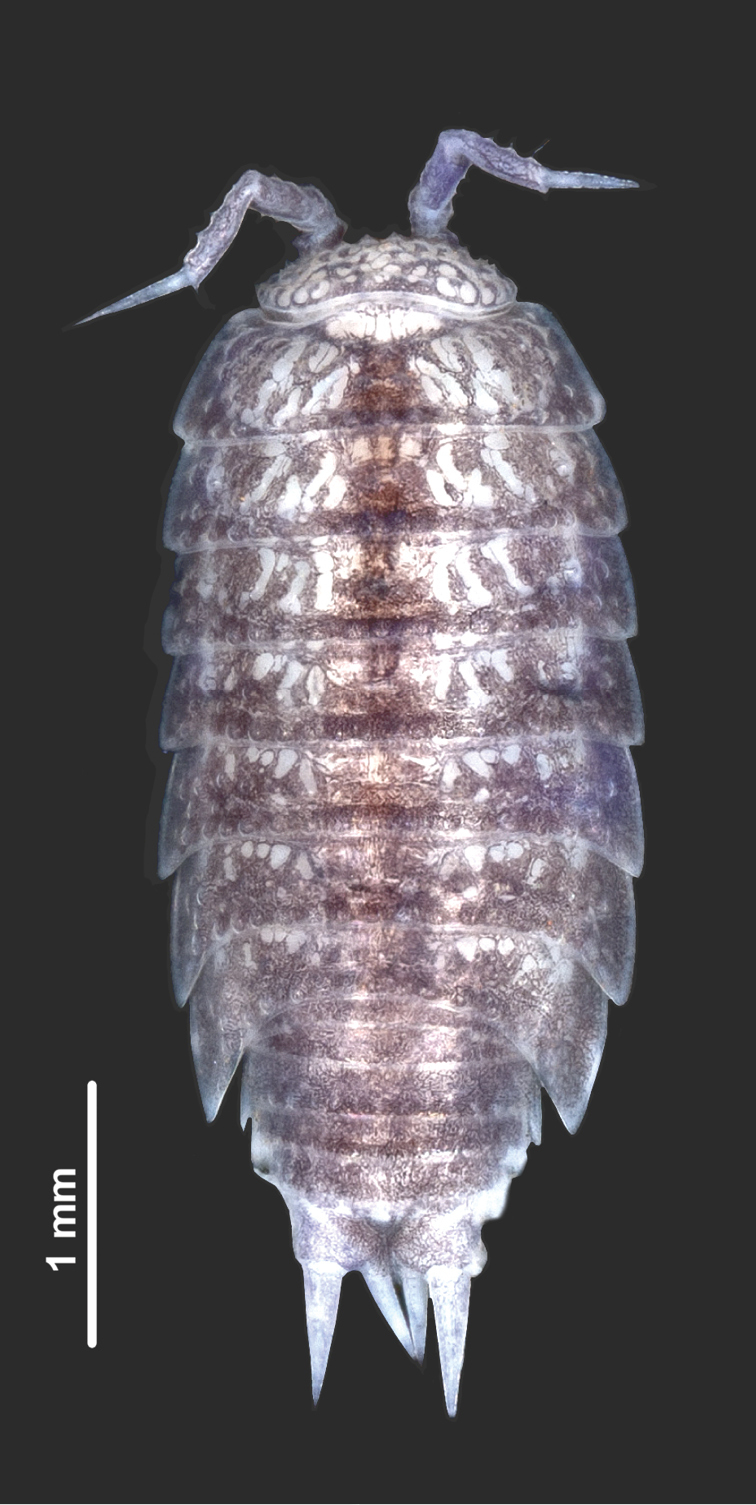
- Styloniscus manuvaka female paratype

Scientific classification
- Kingdom: Animalia
- Phylum: Arthropoda
- Clade: Pancrustacea
- Class: Malacostraca
- Order: Isopoda
- Suborder: Oniscidea
- Family: Styloniscidae; Vandel, 1952

= Styloniscidae =

Styloniscus

Family of woodlice

Styloniscidae is a family of woodlice, including the following genera:

- Clavigeroniscus Arcangeli, 1930
- Cordioniscus Graeve, 1914
- Indoniscus Vandel, 1952
- Kuscheloniscus Strouhal, 1961
- Madoniscus Paulian de Felice, 1950
- Notoniscus Chilton, 1915
- Paranotoniscus Barnard, 1932
- Pectenoniscus Andersson, 1960
- Sinoniscus Schultz, 1995
- Styloniscus Dana, 1852
- Thailandoniscus Dalens, 1989
- Iuiuniscus Souza, Ferreira & Senna, 2015
