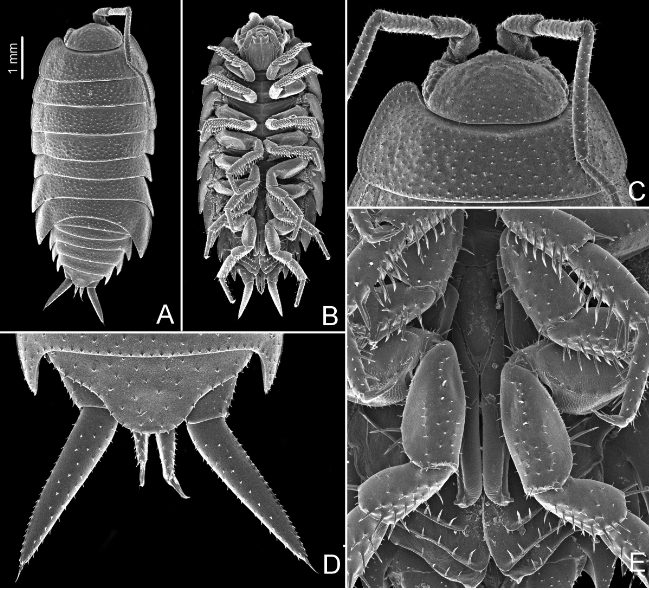
- Various images of both male and female Hawaiioscia nicoyaensis

Scientific classification
- Kingdom: Animalia
- Phylum: Arthropoda
- Clade: Pancrustacea
- Class: Malacostraca
- Order: Isopoda
- Suborder: Oniscidea
- Family: Philosciidae
- Genus: Hawaiioscia; Schultz, 2018

Species
- See text

= Hawaiioscia =

Genus of woodlouse

Hawaiioscia is a genus of woodlouse known from the Hawaii, Rapa Nui, and Costa Rica. The genus was originally described from Hawaii on the presence of four troglobitic species on separate islands. A species within this genus was then described from Rapa Nui which lacked troglobtic traits, but only persists in cave-dwelling relict populations. Surprisingly, another species was then described from along the Pacific Coast of Costa Rica.

== Species ==
Species within this genus include:

- H. rapui (Rapa Nui)
- H. parvituberculata (Maui)
- H. microphthalma (Oahu)
- H. paeninsulae (Molokai)
- H. rotundata (Kauai)
- H. nicoyaensis (Costa Rica)
