= Barnardetia =

Scientific classification
- Kingdom: Animalia
- Phylum: Arthropoda
- Class: Malacostraca
- Order: Isopoda
- Suborder: Oniscidea
- Family: Philosciidae
- Genus: Barnardetia; Xing & Chen, 2013

Synonyms
- Perinetia Barnard, 1958

Genus of crustaceans

Barnardetia is a genus of isopods belonging to the family Philosciidae.

Species:

- Barnardetia reducta (Barnard, 1958)
