= Huntonia =

Scientific classification
- Kingdom: Animalia
- Phylum: Arthropoda
- Class: Malacostraca
- Order: Isopoda
- Suborder: Oniscidea
- Family: Philosciidae
- Genus: Huntonia; Vandel, 1973
- Species: H. montana

Binomial name
- Huntonia montana Vandel, 1973

Genus of crustaceans

Huntonia is a monotypic genus of isopods belonging to the family Philosciidae. The only species is Huntonia montana.
