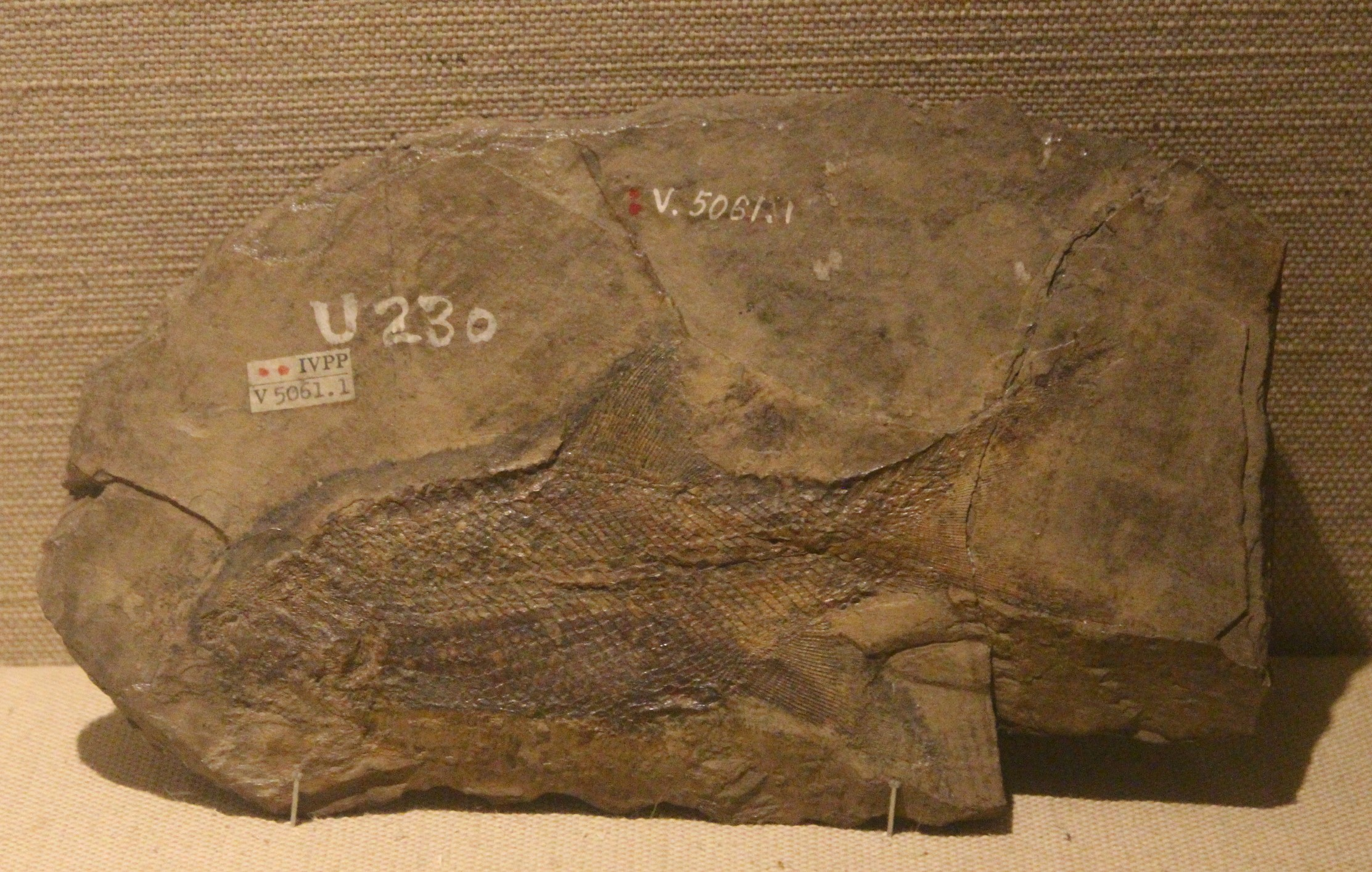
- S. macrolepis (IVPP V5061.1), Paleozoological Museum of China

Scientific classification
- Domain: Eukaryota
- Kingdom: Animalia
- Phylum: Chordata
- Class: Actinopterygii
- Order: †Palaeonisciformes
- Genus: †Sinoniscus; Liu and Wang, 1979

= Sinoniscus =

Sinoniscus Temporal range: Late Permian

Extinct genus of fishes

Sinoniscus is an extinct genus of prehistoric bony fish that lived during the Late Permian epoch.

== See also ==
- Prehistoric fish
- List of prehistoric bony fish
