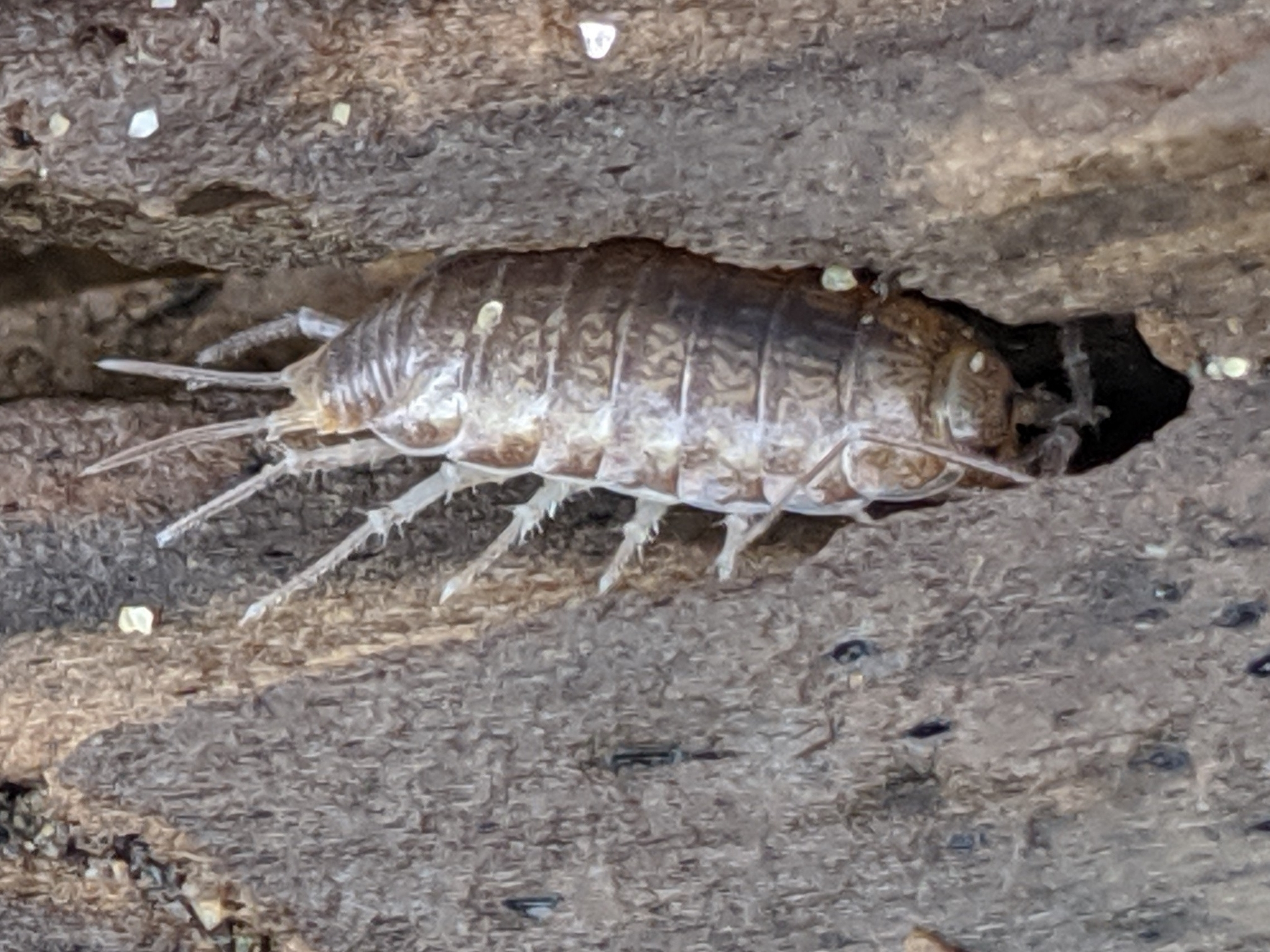
- Littorophiloscia richardsonae

Scientific classification
- Kingdom: Animalia
- Phylum: Arthropoda
- Clade: Pancrustacea
- Class: Malacostraca
- Order: Isopoda
- Suborder: Oniscidea
- Family: Halophilosciidae
- Genus: Littorophiloscia; Hatch, 1947

= Littorophiloscia =

Genus of woodlice

Littorophiloscia is a genus of woodlice in the family Halophilosciidae. There are more than 20 described species in Littorophiloscia.

== Species ==
These 25 species belong to the genus Littorophiloscia:

- Littorophiloscia albicincta (Vandel, 1973)
- Littorophiloscia aldabrana Ferrara & Taiti, 1985
- Littorophiloscia alticola (Vandel, 1977)
- Littorophiloscia amphindica Taiti & Ferrara, 1986
- Littorophiloscia bermudensis (Dahl, 1892)
- Littorophiloscia bifasciata Taiti & Ferrara, 1986
- Littorophiloscia culebrae (H. F. Moore, 1901)
- Littorophiloscia denticulata (Ferrara & Taiti, 1982)
- Littorophiloscia formosana Kwon & Jeon, 1993
- Littorophiloscia hawaiiensis Taiti & Ferrara, 1986
- Littorophiloscia insularis (Lemos de Castro & Souza, 1986)
- Littorophiloscia koreana Taiti & Ferrara, 1986
- Littorophiloscia lineata Kwon, Lee & Jeon, 1993
- Littorophiloscia nipponensis Nunomura, 1986
- Littorophiloscia normae (Van Name, 1924)
- Littorophiloscia occidentalis (Ferrara & Taiti, 1983)
- Littorophiloscia pallida Taiti & Ferrara, 1986
- Littorophiloscia richardsonae (Holmes & Gay, 1909)
- Littorophiloscia riedli (Strouhal, 1966)
- Littorophiloscia strouhali Taiti & Ferrara, 1991
- Littorophiloscia tominensis Taiti, Ferrara & Kwon, 1992
- Littorophiloscia tropicalis Taiti & Ferrara, 1986
- Littorophiloscia visayensis Kim & Kwon, 2002
- Littorophiloscia vittata (Say, 1818)
- Littorophiloscia wangi Kwon & Jeon, 1993
