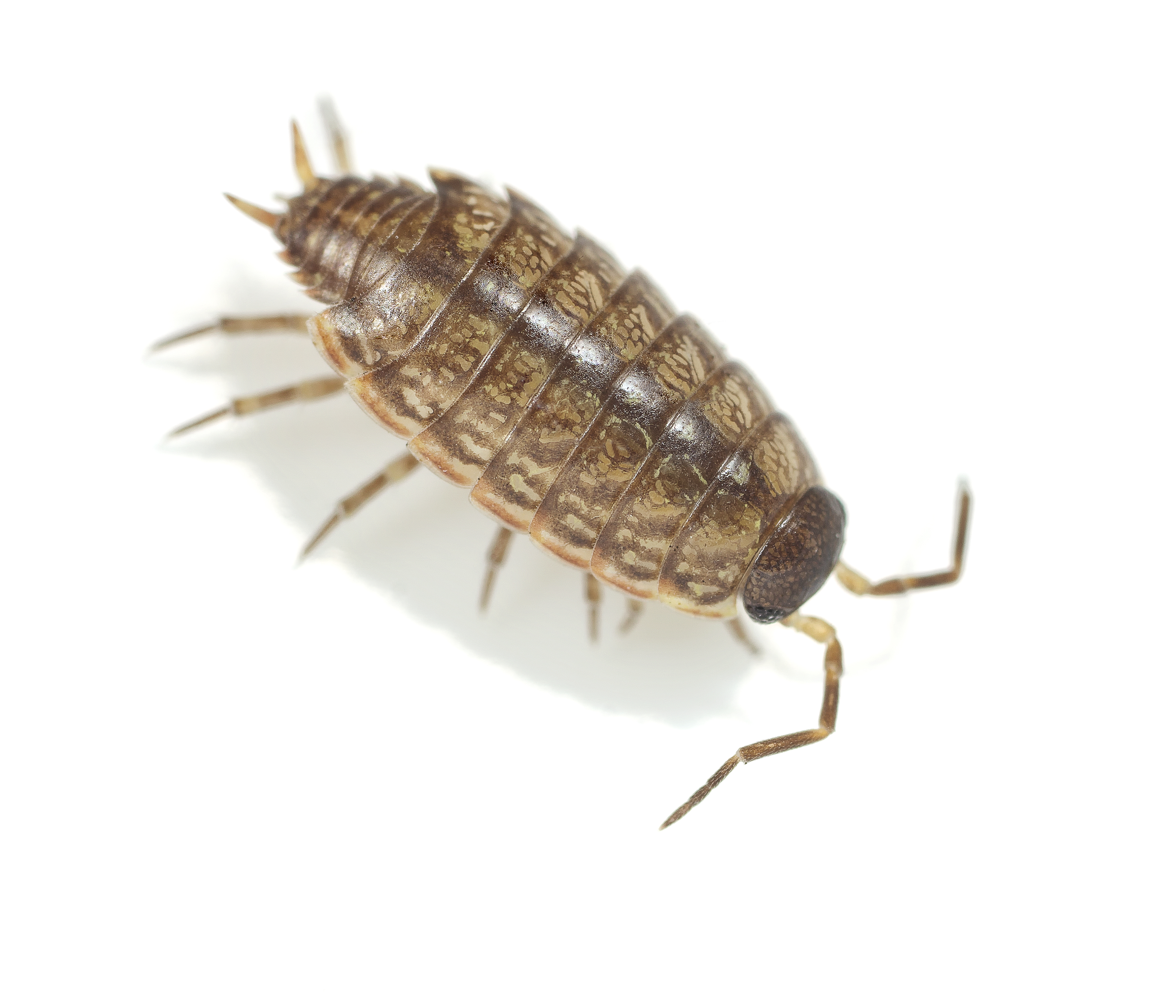

Scientific classification
- Kingdom: Animalia
- Phylum: Arthropoda
- Class: Malacostraca
- Order: Isopoda
- Suborder: Oniscidea
- Family: Philosciidae
- Genus: Philoscia
- Species: P. muscorum

Binomial name
- Philoscia muscorum (Scopoli, 1763)

= Philoscia muscorum =

Species of woodlouse

Philoscia muscorum, the common striped woodlouse or fast woodlouse, is a common European woodlouse. It is widespread in Europe, the British Isles and is found from southern Scandinavia to Ukraine and Greece. It has also spread to Washington and many states in New England, also the mid-Atlantic states of Pennsylvania and New Jersey, as well as Nova Scotia.

== Description ==
P. muscorum may reach 11 millimetres (0.43 in) in length, with a shiny body which is mottled and greyish-brown in colour. The fast woodlouse is, as its name suggests, faster than other common species; its body is raised up off the ground rather more than the others and the head is always very dark in colour.

== Classification ==
Twelve subspecies are recognised:

- Philoscia muscorum albescens Collinge, 1918
- Philoscia muscorum aureomaculata Collinge, 1918
- Philoscia muscorum biellensis Verhoeff, 1936
- Philoscia muscorum dalmatia Verhoeff, 1901
- Philoscia muscorum frigidana Verhoeff, 1928
- Philoscia muscorum maculata Collinge, 1918
- Philoscia muscorum marinensis Verhoeff, 1933
- Philoscia muscorum muscorum (Scopoli, 1763)
- Philoscia muscorum rufa Legrand, 1943
- Philoscia muscorum standeni Collinge, 1917
- Philoscia muscorum triangulifera Verhoeff, 1918
- Philoscia muscorum virescens Collinge, 1917

== Color variation ==
P. muscorum has variable coloration. While most commonly brown or grey, it may also be yellow, red, or orange.

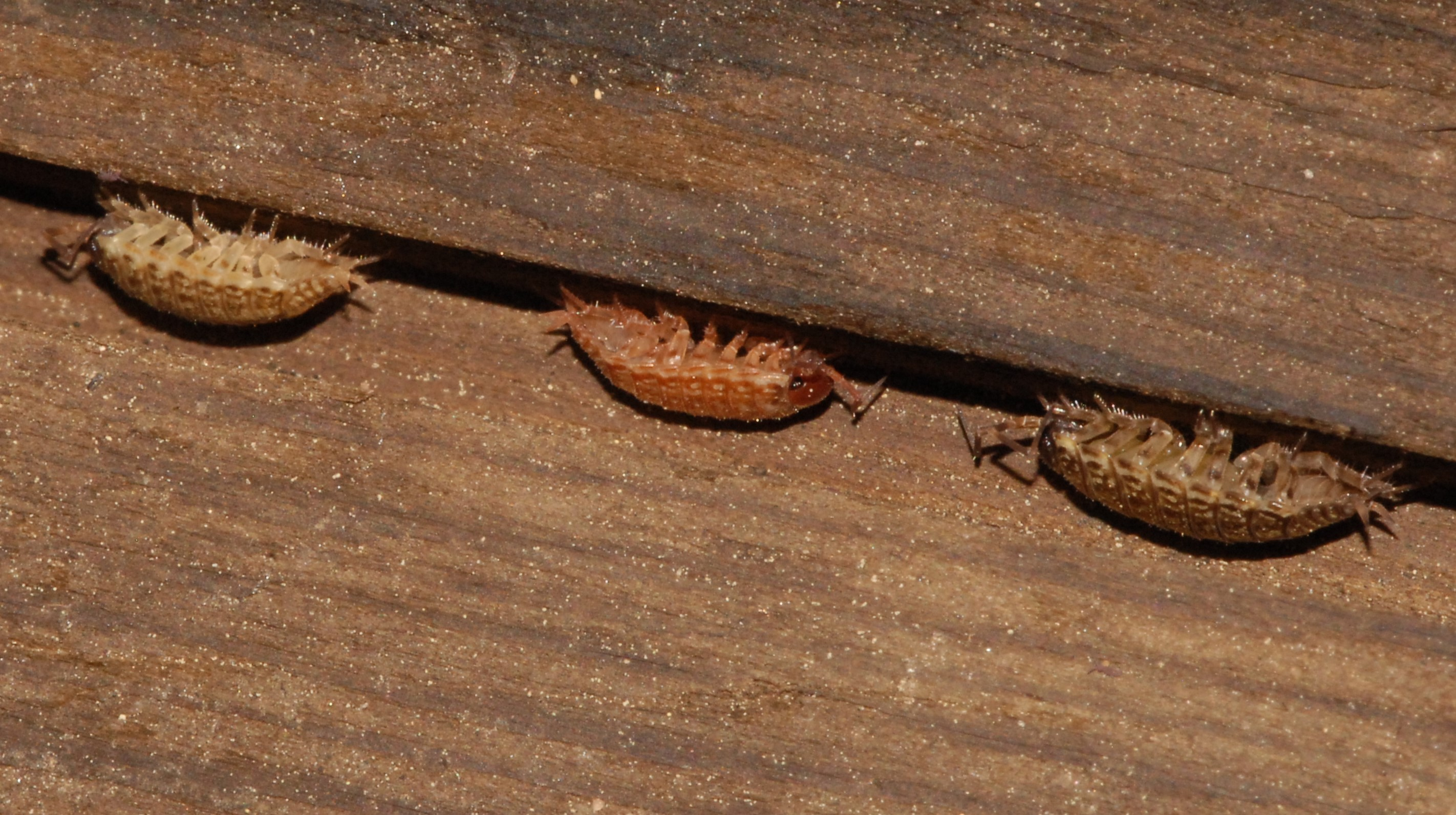
An orange individual next to two grey ones

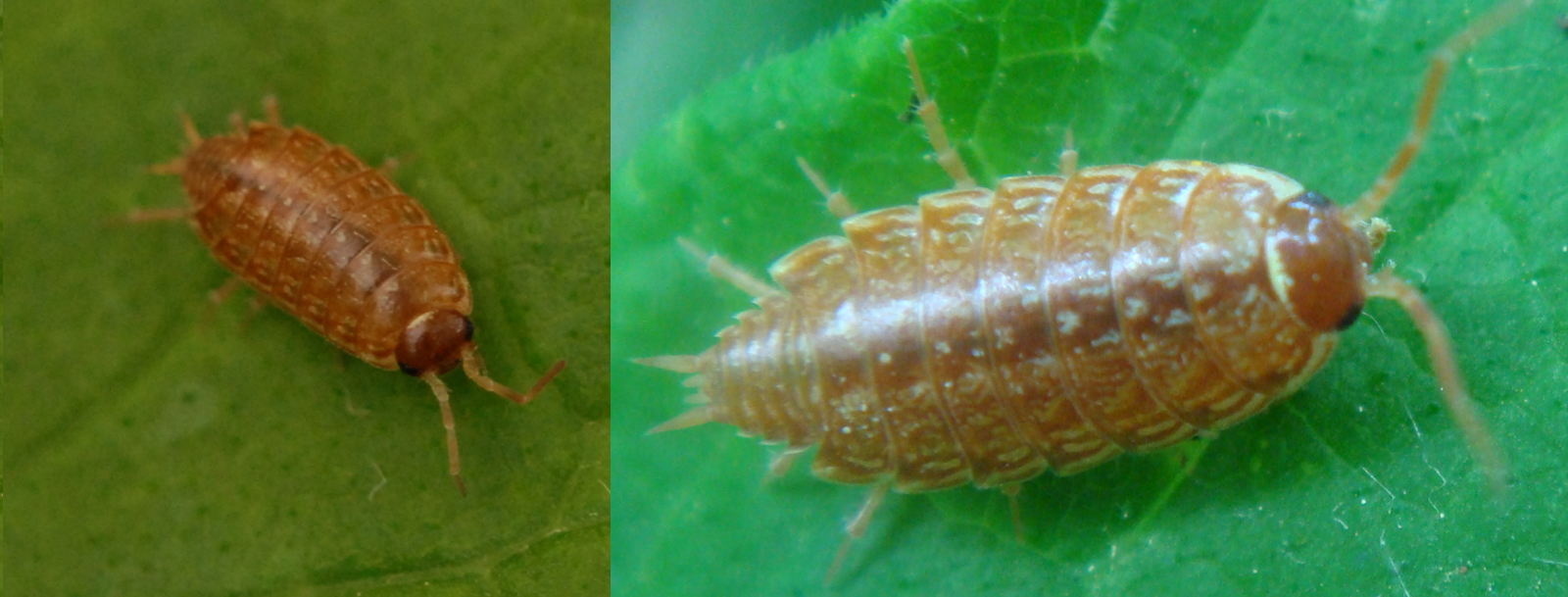
Two orange-colored individuals

== See also ==
- List of woodlice of the British Isles
