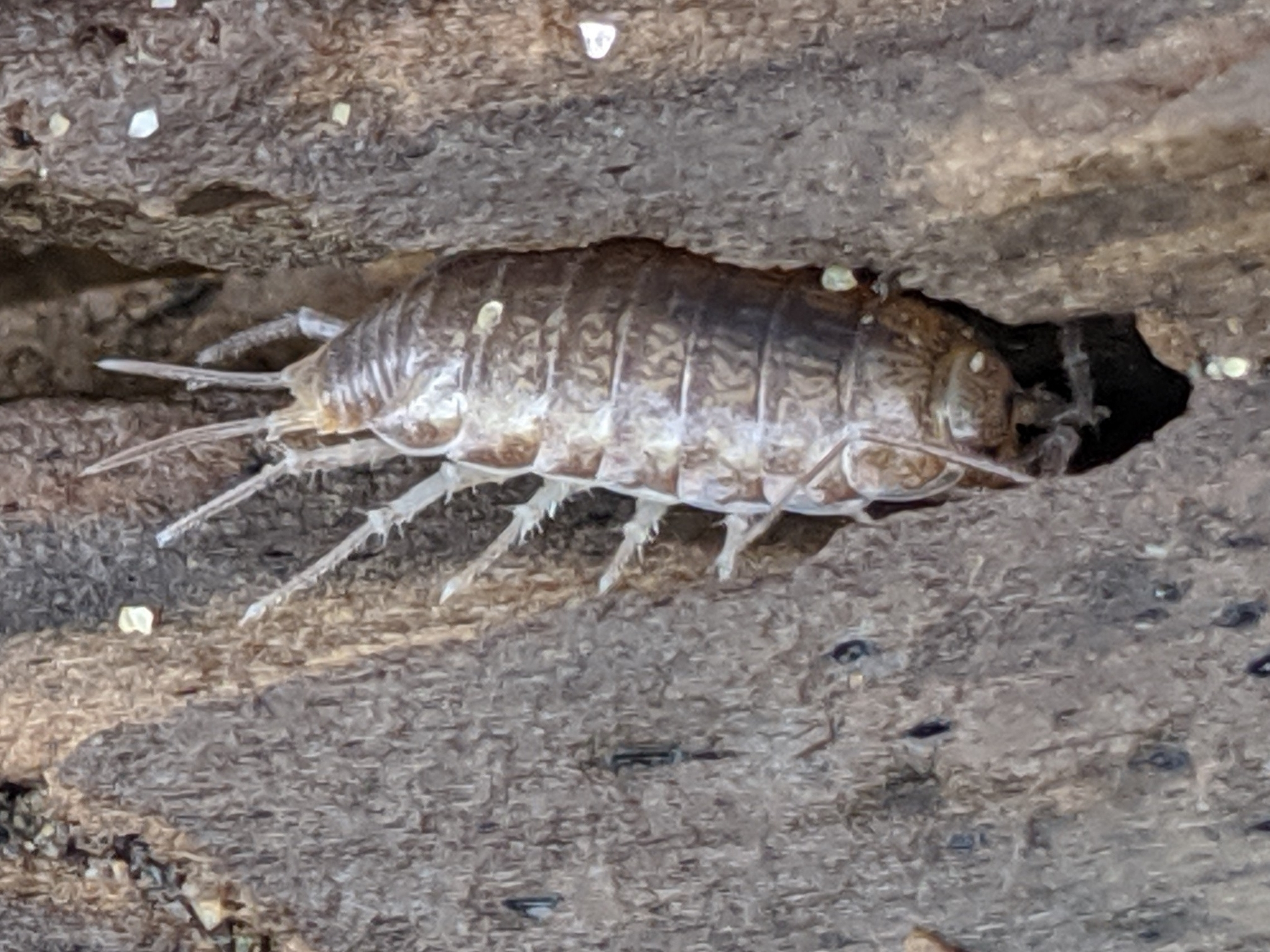
- Littorophiloscia richardsonae, Oakland, California

Scientific classification
- Kingdom: Animalia
- Phylum: Arthropoda
- Class: Malacostraca
- Order: Isopoda
- Suborder: Oniscidea
- Infraorder: Holoverticata
- Family: Halophilosciidae

= Halophilosciidae =

Family of woodlice

Halophilosciidae is a family of woodlice in the order Isopoda. There are at least 3 genera and more than 30 described species in Halophilosciidae.

== Genera ==
These three genera belong to the family Halophilosciidae:

- Halophiloscia Verhoeff, 1908
- Littorophiloscia Hatch, 1947
- Stenophiloscia Verhoeff, 1908
