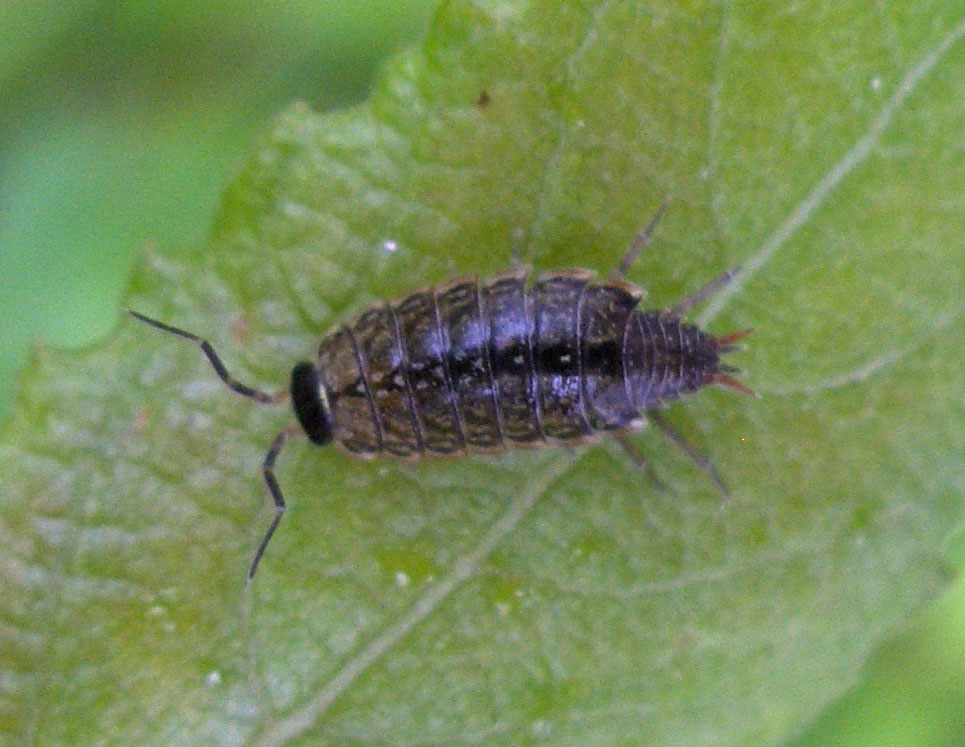
- Philoscia muscorum

Scientific classification
- Kingdom: Animalia
- Phylum: Arthropoda
- Class: Malacostraca
- Order: Isopoda
- Suborder: Oniscidea
- Superfamily: Oniscoidea
- Family: Philosciidae; Kinahan, 1857

Genera
- See text

= Philosciidae =

Family of woodlice

Philosciidae is a family of woodlice. They occur almost everywhere on earth, with most species found in (sub)tropical America, Africa and Oceania, and only a few in the Holarctic realm.

== Genera ==
Philosciidae contains the following genera:

- Abebaioscia Vandel, 1973 - Panniki Cave, Nullarbor Plain, South Australia (monotypic)
- Adeloscia Vandel, 1977 - New Zealand (monotypic)
- Alboscia Schultz, 1995 - Paraguay, southern Brazil (3 species)
- Anaphiloscia Racovitza, 1907 - Northwestern Mediterranean (2 species)
- Anchiphiloscia Stebbing, 1908 - Eastern Africa, Madagascar, Andaman Islands, Chagos Archipelago (18 species)
- Andenoniscus Verhoeff, 1951 - Peru, Panama (2 species)
- Andricophiloscia Vandel, 1973 - Eastern New Guinea (monotypic)
- Androdeloscia Leistikow, 1999 - Tropical America (17 species)
- Aphiloscia Budde-Lund, 1908 - Eastern, southern Africa, Madagascar, islands of western Indian Ocean (19 species)
- Aquitanoscia Broly, de Lourdes Serrano-Sánchez, Rodríguez-García & Vega, 2017
- Araucoscia Verhoeff, 1939 - Chile: Calbuco Island (monotypic)
- Arcangeloscia Schmalfuss & Ferrara, 1978 - Cameroon, Congo, Malawi (7 species)
- Archaeoscia Vandel, 1973 - Cuba (monotypic)
- Arhina Budde-Lund, 1904
- Ashtonia Vandel, 1974 - Australia (monotypic)
- Atlantoscia Ferrara & Taiti, 1981 - Ascension Island, Florida, Brazil, Argentina, St. Helena (2 species)
- Australophiloscia Green, 1990 - Australia, Hawaii, Tonga, Nomuka Iki Islands (3 species)
- Baconaoscia Vandel, 1981 - Cuba (monotypic)
- Barnardetia Xing & Chen, 2013 - formerly Perinetia Barnard, 1959 - Madagascar (monotypic)
- Barnardoscia Taiti & Ferrara, 1982 - South Africa (2 species)
- Benthana Budde-Lund, 1908 - Brazil, Paraguay (15 species)
- Benthanoides Lemos de Castro, 1959 - Peru, Chile (3 species)
- Benthanops Barnard, 1932 - South Africa (monotypic)
- Benthanoscia Lemos de Castro, 1958 - Brazil (monotypic)
- Burmoniscus Collinge, 1914 - Sri Lanka, Nepal, Burma, China, Korea, Taiwan, Indonesia, Cameroon, Sao Tomé, Mozambique, Somalia, Pacific islands (65 species)
- Caraiboscia Vandel, 1968 - Galapagos, Venezuela (2 species)
- Chaetophiloscia Verhoeff, 1908 - Mediterranean (9 to 20 species)
- Colombophiloscia Vandel, 1968 - Cuba (3 species)
- Congophiloscia Arcangeli, 1950 - Guinea Bissau, Cameroon, Angola, Annobon Island (4 species)
- Ctenoscia Verhoeff, 1928 - Western Mediterranean (2 species)
- Cubanophiloscia Vandel, 1973 - Cuba (monotypic)
- Dekanoscia Verhoeff, 1936 - India, cave (monotypic)
- Didima Budde-Lund, 1908 - Madagascar (monotypic)
- Ecuadoroniscus Vandel, 1968 - Ecuador (monotypic)
- Erophiloscia Vandel, 1972 - Colombia, Ecuador (4 species)
- Eurygastor Vandel, 1973 - Australia (2 species)
- Floridoscia Schultz and C. Johnson, 1984 - Southern Florida (monotypic)
- Formicascia Leistikow, 2001 - Guyana (monotypic)
- Gabunoscia Schmalfuss & Ferrara, 1978 - Gabun (monotypic)
- Halophiloscia Verhoff, 1908 - Mediterranean, Crimea, Bermuda, Canary Islands, USA, Argentina (6 or 7 species)
- Hawaiioscia Schultz, 1973 - Hawaii (monotypic)
- Heroldia Verhoeff, 1926 - New Caledonia (6 species)
- Hoctunus Mulaik, 1960 - Mexico (monotypic)
- Huntonia Vandel, 1973 - Australia (monotypic)
- Isabelloscia Vandel, 1973 - Salomon Archipelago (monotypic)
- Ischioscia Verhoeff, 1928 - South America (12 species)
- Javanoscia Schultz, 1985 - Java (monotypic)
- Jimenezia Vandel, 1973 - Cuba (monotypic)
- Laevophiloscia Wahrberg, 1922 - Western Australia (9 species)
- Leonardoscia Campos-Filho, Araujo & Taiti, 2014 - Brazil (monotypic)
- Leonoscia Ferrara & Schmalfuss, 1985 - Sierra Leone (monotypic)
- Lepidoniscus Verhoeff, 1908 - Germany, Switzerland, Austria, Northern Italy, Czech Republic, Slovakia, Yugoslavia (4 species)
- Leptophiloscia Herold, 1931
- Leucophiloscia Vandel, 1973 - New Guinea (monotypic)
- Littorophiloscia Hatch, 1947
- Loboscia Schmidt, 1998 - Malaysia (monotypic)
- Metaprosekia Leistikow, 2000 - Venezuela (monotypic)
- Metriogaster Vandel, 1974 - Australia (monotypic)
- Microphiloscia Vandel, 1973 - Cuba (monotypic)
- Mirtana Leistikow, 1997 - Costa Rica (monotypic)
- Nahia Budde-Lund - South Africa (monotypic)
- Nataloniscus Ferrara & Taiti, 1985 - South Africa (monotypic)
- Natalscia Verhoeff, 1942
- Nesoniscus Verhoeff, 1926 - New Caledonia (2 species)
- Nesophiloscia Vandel, 1968 - Galapagos (monotypic)
- Okeaninoscia Vandel, 1977 - Kermadec Archipelago (monotypic)
- Oniscomorphus Jackson, 1938 - Rapa Nui (monotypic)
- Oniscophiloscia Wahrberg, 1922 - Juan Fernández Islands and adjacent coast of Chile (4 species)
- Oreades Vandel, 1968 - Ecuador (monotypic)
- Oroscia Verhoeff, 1926 - New Caledonia (2 species)
- Oxalaniscus Leistikow, 2000 - Mexico (monotypic)
- Pacroscia Vandel, 1981
- Palaioscia Vandel, 1973 - New Guinea (monotypic)
- Papuaphiloscia Vandel, 1970 - Bismarck Archipelago, China, Guadalcanal, Hawaii, New Guinea, Japan, New Zealand (1monotypic)
- Parachaetophiloscia Cruz & Dalens, 1990 - Spain (monotypic)
- Paractenoscia Taiti & Rossano, 2015 - Morocco (monotypic)
- Paraguascia Schultz, 1995 - Paraguay (monotypic)
- Parapacroscia Vandel, 1981 - Cuba (monotypic)
- Paraphiloscia Stebbing, 1900 - Solomon Islands, Samoa, New Guinea (9 species)
- Parischioscia Lemos de Castro, 1967 - Guiana (monotypic)
- Pentoniscus Richardson, 1913 - Costa Rica (4 species)
- Philoscia Latreille, 1804 - Europe, Mediterranean (ca. 10 species)
- Philoscina Ferrara & Taiti, 1985 - South Africa (3 species)
- Platyburmoniscus Schmidt, 2000 - Sri Lanka (monotypic)
- Platycytoniscus Herold, 1931 - Flores, Sri Lanka (2 species)
- Pleopodoscia Verhoeff, 1942 - East Africa (6 species)
- Plumasicola Vandel, 1981 - Cuba (monotypic)
- Plymophiloscia Wahrberg, 1922 - Australia, Tasmania (8 species)
- Portoricoscia Leistikow, 1999 - Puerto Rico (monotypic)
- Prosekia Vandel, 1968 - Venezuela (monotypic)
- Pseudophiloscia Budde-Lund, 1904 - Chile (3 species)
- Pseudosetaphora Ferrara & Taiti, 1986 - Seychelles (monotypic)
- Pseudotyphloscia Verhoeff, 1928 - Sulawesi, West Java, Taiwan (monotypic)
- Pulmoniscus Leistikow, 2001 - Brazil (2 species)
- Puteoscia Vandel, 1981 - Cuba (monotypic)
- Quintanoscia Leistikow, 2000 - Mexico (monotypic)
- Roraimoscia Leistikow, 2001 - Brazil (monotypic)
- Rostrophiloscia Arcangeli, 1932 - Dominica (monotypic)
- Sechelloscia Taiti & Ferrara, 1980 - Seychelles (monotypic)
- Serendibia Manicastri & Taiti, 1987 - Sri Lanka (monotypic)
- Setaphora Budde-Lund, 1908
- Sinhaloscia Manicastri & Taiti, 1987 - Sri Lanka (monotypic)
- Stenophiloscia Verhoeff, 1908 - Dalmatia, Greece, Italy (6 species)
- Stenopleonoscia Herold, 1931
- Stephenoscia Vandel, 1977 - New Zealand (monotypic)
- Sulesoscia Vandel, 1973 - Cuba (monotypic)
- Tenebrioscia Schultz, 1985 - Java (monotypic)
- Thomasoniscus Vandel, 1981 - Cuba (monotypic)
- Tiroloscia Verhoeff, 1926 - Italy, Spain (9 species)
- Togoscia Schmalfuss & Ferrara, 1978 - Togo (monotypic)
- Tongoscia Dalens, 1988 - Tonga (monotypic)
- Trichophiloscia Arcangeli, 1950 - Sardinia (monotypic)
- Troglophiloscia Brian, 1929 - Cuba, Mexico, Belize (3 species)
- Tropicana Manicastri & Taiti, 1987 - Hawaii, Sri Lanka, Comoro Islands, Cameroon (monotypic)
- Tropiscia Vandel, 1968
- Uluguroscia Taiti & Ferrara, 1980 - Ecuador (monotypic)
- Vandelia Kammerer, 2006 (replacement name for Verhoeffiella Vandel, 1970) - New Caledonia (monotypic)
- Vandelophiloscia Schmalfuss & Ferrara, 1978 - Ivory Coast (monotypic)
- Verhoeffiella Vandel, 1970
- Wahrbergia Verhoeff, 1926 - New Caledonia (monotypic)
- Xiphoniscus Vandel, 1968 - Ecuador (monotypic)
- Yaerikima Leistikow, 2001 - Guyana (monotypic)
- Zebrascia Verhoeff, 1942 - Ivory Coast, Bioko, Cameroon (2 species)
